= List of European Junior Canoe Slalom Championships medalists =

This is a list of medalists from the European Junior and U23 Canoe Slalom Championships in the junior (under 18) category.

== Individual ==
=== Canoe Single (C1) Men ===
Championships	Gold	Silver	Bronze
1995 Liptovský Mikuláš	Michal Martikán (SVK)	Tony Estanguet (FRA)	Juraj Minčík (SVK)
1997 Nowy Sącz	Michal Martikán (SVK)	Konrad Korzeniewski (POL)	Stanislav Gejdoš (SVK)
1999 Solkan	Přemysl Vlk (CZE)	Alexander Slafkovský (SVK)	Jan Benzien (GER)
2001 Bratislava	Alexander Slafkovský (SVK)	Krzysztof Supowicz (POL)	Grzegorz Kiljanek (POL)
2003 Hohenlimburg	Timo Wirsching (GER)	Florian Beck (GER)	Jarosław Chwastowicz (POL)
2004 Kraków	Matej Beňuš (SVK)	Dawid Bartos (POL)	Ján Bátik (SVK)
2005 Kraków	Norbert Neveu (FRA)	Christos Tsakmakis (GRE)	Denis Gargaud Chanut (FRA)
2006 Nottingham	Grzegorz Hedwig (POL)	Dawid Bartos (POL)	Mark Proctor (GBR)
2007 Kraków	Sideris Tasiadis (GER)	Greg Pitt (GBR)	Jernej Zupan (SLO)
2008 Solkan	Sideris Tasiadis (GER)	Jernej Zupan (SLO)	Anže Berčič (SLO)
2009 Liptovský Mikuláš	Patrik Gajarský (SVK)	Ruslan Sayfiev (RUS)	Jeremy Moreaux (FRA)
2010 Markkleeberg	Kacper Gondek (POL)	Kirill Setkin (RUS)	Kilian Foulon (FRA)
2011 Banja Luka	Roberto Colazingari (ITA)	Kirill Setkin (RUS)	Igor Sztuba (POL)
2012 Solkan	Franz-Xaver Strauss (GER)	Dennis Söter (GER)	Alexander Ovchinikov (RUS)
2013 Bourg-Saint-Maurice	Cédric Joly (FRA)	Lukáš Rohan (CZE)	Florian Breuer (GER)
2014 Skopje	Raffaello Ivaldi (ITA)	Florian Breuer (GER)	Marko Gurečka (SVK)
2015 Kraków	Marko Mirgorodský (SVK)	Sören Loos (GER)	Florian Breuer (GER)
2016 Solkan	Matyáš Lhota (CZE)	Marko Mirgorodský (SVK)	Václav Chaloupka (CZE)
2017 Hohenlimburg	Vojtěch Heger (CZE)	Matyáš Lhota (CZE)	Lennard Tuchscherer (GER)
2018 Bratislava	Miquel Travé (ESP)	Nicolas Gestin (FRA)	Flavio Micozzi (ITA)
2019 Liptovský Mikuláš	Yohann Senechault (FRA)	Martin Kratochvíl (CZE)	Adam Král (CZE)
2020 Kraków	Mewen Debliquy (FRA)	Adam Král (CZE)	Yohann Senechault (FRA)
2021 Solkan	Mewen Debliquy (FRA)	Adam Král (CZE)	Tanguy Adisson (FRA)
2022 České Budějovice	Samuel Krajčí (SVK)	Žiga Lin Hočevar (SLO)	Markel Imaz (ESP)
2023 Bratislava	Filip Jiras (CZE)	Elouan Debliquy (FRA)	Lukáš Kratochvíl (CZE)
2024 Kraków	Žiga Lin Hočevar (SLO)	Martin Cornu (FRA)	Matej Trojanšek (SLO)
2025 Solkan	Dominik Egyházy (SVK)	Oier Díaz (ESP)	Žiga Lin Hočevar (SLO)
2026 Épinal	Léo Royé (FRA)	Cyrian Menuat (FRA)	Tomáš Indruch (CZE)

=== Canoe Double (C2) Men ===
Championships	Gold	Silver	Bronze
1995 Liptovský Mikuláš	Sławomir Mordarski/Andrzej Wójs (POL)	Robby Simon/Kay Simon (GER)	Frank Henze/Sebastian Brendel (GER)
1997 Nowy Sącz	Andrzej Wójs/Sławomir Mordarski (POL)	Pavol Hochschorner/Peter Hochschorner (SVK)	Martin Rasner/Jan Hošek (CZE)
1999 Solkan	Marcus Becker/Stefan Henze (GER)	Martin Braud/Cédric Forgit (FRA)	Krzysztof Bogatek/Dariusz Wrzosek (POL)
2001 Bratislava	David Schröder/Philipp Bergner (GER)	Remy Gaspard/Julien Gaspard (FRA)	Martin Hammer/Ladislav Vlček (CZE)
2003 Hohenlimburg	Fedor Lakirev/Sergey Ermakov (RUS)	Martin Hammer/Ladislav Vlček (CZE)	Viktor Vácha/Štěpán Sehnal (CZE)
2004 Kraków	Gauthier Klauss/Matthieu Péché (FRA)	Kai Müller/Kevin Müller (GER)	Aymeric Maynadier/Sébastien Perilhou (FRA)
2005 Kraków	Gauthier Klauss/Matthieu Péché (FRA)	Hugo Biso/Pierre Picco (FRA)	Maxime Janin/Yoann Janin (FRA)
2006 Nottingham	Robert Gotvald/Jan Vlček (CZE)	Hugo Biso/Pierre Picco (FRA)	Yoan Del Rey/Arthur Grandemange (FRA)
2007 Kraków	Robert Behling/Thomas Becker (GER)	Karol Kasprzak/Marcin Kasprzak (POL)	Kamil Gondek/Andrzej Poparda (POL)
2008 Solkan	Andrzej Poparda/Kamil Gondek (POL)	Ondřej Karlovský/Jakub Jáně (CZE)	Robert Gotvald/Jan Vlček (CZE)
2009 Liptovský Mikuláš	Jonáš Kašpar/Marek Šindler (CZE)	Dariusz Chlebek/Patryk Brzeziński (POL)	Rhys Davies/Matthew Lister (GBR)
2010 Markkleeberg	Michał Wiercioch/Grzegorz Majerczak (POL)	Jan Michael Müller/Marcel Prinz (GER)	Jakub Hojda/Tomáš Macášek (CZE)
2011 Banja Luka	Filip Brzeziński/Andrzej Brzeziński (POL)	Yves Prigent/Loïc Kervella (FRA)	Radek Pospíchal/Marek Cepek (CZE)
2012 Solkan	Dmitriy Azanov/Egor Gover (RUS)	Aaron Jüttner/Piet Lennart Wagner (GER)	Aleksei Popov/Vadim Voinalovich (RUS)
2013 Bourg-Saint-Maurice	Matúš Gewissler/Juraj Skákala (SVK)	Jakob Jeklin/Niko Testen (SLO)	Thomas Schmitt/Yann Rivallant (FRA)
2014 Skopje	Guillaume Graille/Lucas Roisin (FRA)	Jan Větrovský/Michael Matějka (CZE)	Igor Mikhailov/Nikolay Shkliaruk (RUS)
2015 Kraków	Niklas Hecht/Alexander Weber (GER)	Pavel Kotov/Sergei Komkov (RUS)	Jan Mrázek/Tomáš Rousek (CZE)
2016 Solkan	Pavel Kotov/Sergei Komkov (RUS)	Jakub Brzeziński/Kacper Sztuba (POL)	Eric Borrmann/Leo Braune (GER)
2017 Hohenlimburg (non-medal event)	Jan Vrublovský/Petr Novotný (CZE)	Nikolaos-Emmanouil Pantazis/Panagiotis Arvanitis (GRE)	Daniil Lipikhin/Igor Stafeev (RUS)

=== Kayak (K1) Men ===
Championships	Gold	Silver	Bronze
1995 Liptovský Mikuláš	Ivan Pišvejc (CZE)	Julien Dekarczyk (FRA)	Tomáš Kobes (CZE)
1997 Nowy Sącz	Floris Braat (NED)	Claus Suchanek (GER)	Tomáš Turček (SVK)
1999 Solkan	Fabien Lefèvre (FRA)	Andrej Nolimal (SLO)	Gregor Laznik (SLO)
2001 Bratislava	Daniele Molmenti (ITA)	Jens Ewald (GER)	Lukáš Kubričan (CZE)
2003 Hohenlimburg	Grzegorz Polaczyk (POL)	Erik Pfannmöller (GER)	Alexander Grimm (GER)
2004 Kraków	Michal Buchtel (CZE)	Luboš Hilgert (CZE)	Vavřinec Hradilek (CZE)
2005 Kraków	Sebastian Schubert (GER)	Mateusz Polaczyk (POL)	Sébastien Combot (FRA)
2006 Nottingham	Jan Vondra (CZE)	Lucien Delfour (FRA)	Mateusz Polaczyk (POL)
2007 Kraków	Hannes Aigner (GER)	Pavel Eigel (RUS)	Étienne Daille (FRA)
2008 Solkan	Pavel Eigel (RUS)	Thomas Brady (GBR)	Ondřej Tunka (CZE)
2009 Liptovský Mikuláš	Martin Halčin (SVK)	Michał Pasiut (POL)	Tobias Kargl (GER)
2010 Markkleeberg	Jiří Prskavec (CZE)	Fabian Schweikert (GER)	Rafał Polaczyk (POL)
2011 Banja Luka	Simon Brus (SLO)	Jiří Prskavec (CZE)	Andrej Málek (SVK)
2012 Solkan	Stefan Hengst (GER)	Bastien Damiens (FRA)	Andrej Málek (SVK)
2013 Bourg-Saint-Maurice	Jakub Grigar (SVK)	Bastien Damiens (FRA)	Vid Karner (SLO)
2014 Skopje	Jakob Weger (ITA)	Pol Oulhen (FRA)	Niko Testen (SLO)
2015 Kraków	Niko Testen (SLO)	Richard Macúš (SVK)	Alexandr Maikranz (CZE)
2016 Solkan	Jakob Weger (ITA)	Felix Oschmautz (AUT)	Jakob Jež (SLO)
2017 Hohenlimburg	Tine Kancler (SLO)	Adam Gonšenica (SVK)	Simon Hene (FRA)
2018 Bratislava	Miquel Travé (ESP)	Tomáš Zima (CZE)	Jan Bárta (CZE)
2019 Liptovský Mikuláš	Anatole Delassus (FRA)	Pau Echaniz (ESP)	Etienne Chappell (GBR)
2020 Kraków	Egor Smirnov (RUS)	Martin Rudorfer (CZE)	Jakub Krejčí (CZE)
2021 Solkan	Martin Rudorfer (CZE)	Egor Smirnov (RUS)	Jan Ločnikar (SLO)
2022 České Budějovice	Titouan Castryck (FRA)	Žiga Lin Hočevar (SLO)	Richard Rumanský (SVK)
2023 Bratislava	Martin Cornu (FRA)	Xabier Ferrazzi (ITA)	Žiga Lin Hočevar (SLO)
2024 Kraków	Martin Cornu (FRA)	Žiga Lin Hočevar (SLO)	Michele Pistoni (ITA)
2025 Solkan	Faust Clotet Juanmarti (ESP)	Daniele Romano (ITA)	Michal Kopeček (CZE)
2026 Épinal	Jakob Ungvari (GER)	Kilian Käding (GER)	Théo Chetoui (FRA)

=== Kayak cross Men ===
Championships	Gold	Silver	Bronze
2021 Solkan	Martin Rudorfer (CZE)	Edouard Chenal (FRA)	Michał Ciągło (POL)
2022 České Budějovice	Titouan Castryck (FRA)	Martin Cornu (FRA)	Edward McDonald (GBR)
2023 Bratislava	Moritz Kremslehner (AUT)	Lukáš Kratochvíl (CZE)	Martin Cornu (FRA)
2024 Kraków	Filip Duda (SVK)	Jáchym Burger (CZE)	Žiga Lin Hočevar (SLO)
2025 Solkan	Michal Kopeček (CZE)	Gwion Williams (GBR)	Martin Panzer (CZE)
2026 Épinal	Max Steinbrenner (AUT)	Sid Griffiths (GBR)	Tim Redling (SUI)

=== Kayak cross individual Men ===
Championships	Gold	Silver	Bronze
2024 Kraków	Martin Cornu (FRA)	Michele Pistoni (ITA)	Jonah Hanrahan (GBR)
2025 Solkan	Žiga Lin Hočevar (SLO)	Dávid Skubík (SVK)	Clément Davy (FRA)
2026 Épinal	Marek Kulczycki (POL)	Arkhyp Krachko (UKR)	Dídac Foz (ESP)

=== Canoe Single (C1) Women ===
Championships	Gold	Silver	Bronze
2010 Markkleeberg	Viktoria Wolffhardt (AUT)	Mallory Franklin (GBR)	Jessica Decker (GER)
2011 Banja Luka	Viktoria Wolffhardt (AUT)	Jasmine Royle (GBR)	Karolin Wagner (GER)
2012 Solkan	Kimberley Woods (GBR)	Mallory Franklin (GBR)	Viktoria Wolffhardt (AUT)
2013 Bourg-Saint-Maurice	Kimberley Woods (GBR)	Nadine Weratschnig (AUT)	Jana Matulková (CZE)
2014 Skopje	Martina Satková (CZE)	Birgit Ohmayer (GER)	Karolin Wagner (GER)
2015 Kraków	Nadine Weratschnig (AUT)	Miren Lazkano (ESP)	Lucie Prioux (FRA)
2016 Solkan	Simona Maceková (SVK)	Kira Kubbe (GER)	Tereza Fišerová (CZE)
2017 Hohenlimburg	Monica Doria Vilarrubla (AND)	Zoe Jakob (GER)	Gabriela Satková (CZE)
2018 Bratislava	Daria Shaidurova (RUS)	Soňa Stanovská (SVK)	Gabriela Satková (CZE)
2019 Liptovský Mikuláš	Gabriela Satková (CZE)	Elena Borghi (ITA)	Bethan Forrow (GBR)
2020 Kraków	Tereza Kneblová (CZE)	Doriane Delassus (FRA)	Camille Castryck (FRA)
2021 Solkan	Zuzana Paňková (SVK)	Elena Micozzi (ITA)	Marina Novysh (RUS)
2022 České Budějovice	Klára Kneblová (CZE)	Adriana Morenová (CZE)	Lucie Krech (GER)
2023 Bratislava	Neele Krech (GER)	Naja Pinterič (SLO)	Paulina Pirro (GER)
2024 Kraków	Valentýna Kočířová (CZE)	Arina Kontchakov (GBR)	Christin Heydenreich (GER)
2025 Solkan	Eyleen Vuilleumier (SUI)	Ainara Goikoetxea (ESP)	Margot Lapeze (FRA)
2026 Épinal	Valentýna Kočířová (CZE)	Nova Müller (GER)	Margot Lapeze (FRA)

=== Kayak (K1) Women ===
Championships	Gold	Silver	Bronze
1995 Liptovský Mikuláš	Vanda Semerádová (CZE)	Gabriela Stacherová (SVK)	Kristýna Mrázová (SVK)
1997 Nowy Sącz	Laura Blakeman (GBR)	Hana Pešková (CZE)	Beata Grzesik (POL)
1999 Solkan	Jennifer Bongardt (GER)	Marie Řihošková (CZE)	Petra Semerádová (CZE)
2001 Bratislava	Katharina Volke (GER)	Kateřina Hošková (CZE)	Nina Mozetič (SLO)
2003 Hohenlimburg	Kateřina Hošková (CZE)	Melanie Pfeifer (GER)	Jasmin Schornberg (GER)
2004 Kraków	Petra Slováková (CZE)	Corinna Kuhnle (AUT)	Gina Kaluza (GER)
2005 Kraków	Michaela Grimm (GER)	Šárka Blažková (CZE)	Dorothée Utz (GER)
2006 Nottingham	Kateřina Kudějová (CZE)	Šárka Blažková (CZE)	Urša Kragelj (SLO)
2007 Kraków	Cindy Pöschel (GER)	Kateřina Kudějová (CZE)	Stefanie Horn (GER)
2008 Solkan	Kateřina Kudějová (CZE)	Eva Terčelj (SLO)	Stefanie Horn (GER)
2009 Liptovský Mikuláš	Stefanie Horn (GER)	Nouria Newman (FRA)	Ricarda Funk (GER)
2010 Markkleeberg	Maria Clara Giai Pron (ITA)	Pavlína Zástěrová (CZE)	Eva Terčelj (SLO)
2011 Banja Luka	Lisa Fritsche (GER)	Pavlína Zástěrová (CZE)	Caroline Trompeter (GER)
2012 Solkan	Karolína Galušková (CZE)	Kimberley Woods (GBR)	Viktoria Wolffhardt (AUT)
2013 Bourg-Saint-Maurice	Lisa Leitner (AUT)	Karolína Galušková (CZE)	Julia Cuchi (ESP)
2014 Skopje	Anna Faber (GER)	Klaudia Zwolińska (POL)	Camille Prigent (FRA)
2015 Kraków	Klaudia Zwolińska (POL)	Nina Weratschnig (AUT)	Michaela Haššová (SVK)
2016 Solkan	Klaudia Zwolińska (POL)	Michaela Haššová (SVK)	Laia Sorribes (ESP)
2017 Hohenlimburg	Laia Sorribes (ESP)	Antonie Galušková (CZE)	Romane Prigent (FRA)
2018 Bratislava	Nikita Setchell (GBR)	Eva Alina Hočevar (SLO)	Antonie Galušková (CZE)
2019 Liptovský Mikuláš	Kateřina Beková (CZE)	Antonie Galušková (CZE)	Francesca Malaguti (ITA)
2020 Kraków	Paulina Pirro (GER)	Emma Vuitton (FRA)	Kateřina Beková (CZE)
2021 Solkan	Zuzana Paňková (SVK)	Ivana Chlebová (SVK)	Emma Vuitton (FRA)
2022 České Budějovice	Paulina Pirro (GER)	Olga Samková (CZE)	Maite Odriozola (ESP)
2023 Bratislava	Paulina Pirro (GER)	Olga Samková (CZE)	Charlotte Wild (GER)
2024 Kraków	Hanna Danek (POL)	Bára Galušková (CZE)	Markéta Hojdová (CZE)
2025 Solkan	Karolína Abrahámová (SVK)	Arina Kontchakov (GBR)	Markéta Hojdová (CZE)
2026 Épinal	Valentýna Kočířová (CZE)	Nova Müller (GER)	Karolína Abrahámová (SVK)

=== Kayak cross Women ===
Championships	Gold	Silver	Bronze
2021 Solkan	Tereza Kneblová (CZE)	Dominika Danek (POL)	Zuzana Paňková (SVK)
2022 České Budějovice	Olga Samková (CZE)	Naja Pinterič (SLO)	Arina Kontchakov (GBR)
2023 Bratislava	Bára Galušková (CZE)	Naja Pinterič (SLO)	Hannah Rhodes (GBR)
2024 Kraków	Mina Blume (GER)	Arina Kontchakov (GBR)	Haizea Segura (ESP)
2025 Solkan	Britta Jung (GER)	Laurette Laly (FRA)	Ainara Goikoetxea (ESP)
2026 Épinal	Valentýna Kočířová (CZE)	Lucie Vaculová (CZE)	Carla Rhein (SUI)

=== Kayak cross individual Women ===
Championships	Gold	Silver	Bronze
2024 Kraków	Klára Mrázková (CZE)	Eyleen Vuilleumier (SUI)	Naja Pinterič (SLO)
2025 Solkan	Anna Simona (ESP)	Mina Blume (GER)	Olwen Yates (GBR)
2026 Épinal	Lucie Vaculová (CZE)	Valentýna Kočířová (CZE)	Markéta Štěpánková (CZE)

== Teams ==
=== Canoe Single (C1) Men Teams ===
Championships	Gold	Silver	Bronze
1995 Liptovský Mikuláš	Slovakia; Michal Martikán; Juraj Minčík; Dušan Ovčarík	Germany; Andreas Krohn; Jan Heinecke; Steffen Conradt	France; Tony Estanguet; Guillaume Wattez; Ugo Richard
1997 Nowy Sącz	Poland; Konrad Korzeniewski; Sławomir Mordarski; Andrzej Wójs	Germany; Achim Heib; Sebastian Steinhäuser; Stefan Pfannmöller	Slovenia; Janez Korenjak; Aljaž Hamberger; Primož Gabrijelčič
1999 Solkan	Germany; Christian Bahmann; Max Remmele; Jan Benzien	Czech Republic; Stanislav Kaděra; David Chod; Přemysl Vlk	Slovenia; Drejc Žabjek; Anže Ruden; Anže Buh
2001 Bratislava	Poland; Krzysztof Supowicz; Grzegorz Kiljanek; Jarosław Chwastowicz	France; Nicolas Peschier; Hervé Chevrier; Mathieu Voyemant	Slovakia; Alexander Slafkovský; Milan Hrobský; Tomáš Kučera
2003 Hohenlimburg	Germany; Timo Wirsching; Martin Unger; Florian Beck	France; Pascal Buck; Hugues Prévot; Thomas Biselx	Czech Republic; Matěj Suchý; Michal Jáně; Martin Leskovjan
2005 Kraków	France; Denis Gargaud Chanut; Jonathan Marc; Norbert Neveu	Poland; Dawid Bartos; Krzysztof Borzędzki; Grzegorz Hedwig	Germany; Sideris Tasiadis; Stephan Borchert; Rico Massalski
2006 Nottingham	Poland; Grzegorz Hedwig; Piotr Szczepański; Dawid Bartos	France; Sébastien Cardiet; Thibaud Vielliard; Norbert Neveu	Slovakia; Matej Skubík; Juraj Ontko; Lukáš Gajarský
2007 Kraków	Germany; Sideris Tasiadis; Franz Anton; Alexander Funk	Slovenia; Jure Lenarčič; Jernej Zupan; Blaž Cof	Czech Republic; Jan Busta; Tomáš Rak; Jiří Herink
2008 Solkan	Germany; Sideris Tasiadis; Christian Scholz; Alexander Funk	Slovenia; Jure Lenarčič; Jernej Zupan; Anže Berčič	Czech Republic; Martin Říha; Jiří Herink; František Jordán
2009 Liptovský Mikuláš	Poland; Kacper Gondek; Arkadiusz Nieć; Konrad Bobrowski	Czech Republic; Martin Říha; František Jordán; Michal Pešek	Russia; Ruslan Sayfiev; Alexey Shimko; Kirill Setkin
2010 Markkleeberg	Germany; Sebastian Tilgner; Frederick Pfeiffer; Maceo Mahne	Poland; Kacper Gondek; Wojciech Pasiut; Igor Sztuba	Czech Republic; Martin Říha; Radim Božek; Michal Pešek
2011 Banja Luka	France; Maxime Perron; Antoine Runet; Jean Freri	Czech Republic; Jakub Mrůzek; Marek Cepek; Jakub Hojda	Russia; Alexander Ovchinikov; Vsevolod Dolgih; Kirill Setkin
2012 Solkan	Germany; Dennis Söter; Franz-Xaver Strauss; Florian Breuer	Czech Republic; Marek Cepek; Lukáš Rohan; Jakub Mrůzek	Slovakia; Marko Gurečka; Martin Mračna; Tomáš Džurný
2013 Bourg-Saint-Maurice	Great Britain; Thomas Abbott; Samuel Ibbotson; Daniel Evans	France; Cédric Joly; Julian Othenin-Girard; Erwan Marchais	Russia; Pavel Smirnov; Yuri Snegirev; Aleksei Popov
2014 Skopje	Germany; Florian Breuer; Timo Trummer; Leon Hanika	Czech Republic; Václav Chaloupka; Tomáš Heger; Matyáš Lhota	Great Britain; Samuel Ibbotson; William Coney; Jac Davies
2015 Kraków	France; Lucas Roisin; Antoine Gaillard; Tom Maffeis	Poland; Kacper Sztuba; Przemysław Nowak; Dominik Janur	Germany; Florian Breuer; Sören Loos; Malte Horn
2016 Solkan	Italy; Carlo Bullo; Gabriele Ciulla; Mandi Mandia	Czech Republic; Václav Chaloupka; Matyáš Lhota; Matouš Příhoda	Slovenia; Jakob Jeklin; Tine Kancler; Urh Turnšek
2017 Hohenlimburg	Czech Republic; Vojtěch Heger; Matyáš Lhota; Jan Kaminský	Spain; Miquel Travé; Eneko Auzmendi; Pau Echaniz	Poland; Kacper Sztuba; Szymon Zawadzki; Michał Franczak
2018 Bratislava	Czech Republic; Vojtěch Heger; Petr Novotný; Eduard Lerch	France; Nicolas Gestin; Alexis Bobon; Jules Bernardet	Germany; Leo Braune; Hannes Seumel; Julian Lindolf
2019 Liptovský Mikuláš	Slovakia; Ľudovít Macúš; Juraj Mráz; Juraj Dieška	Czech Republic; Kryštof Lhota; Adam Král; Martin Kratochvíl	Germany; Benjamin Kies; Julian Lindolf; Felix Göttling
2020 Kraków	Czech Republic; Martin Kratochvíl; Adam Král; Kryštof Lhota	France; Yohann Senechault; Loïc Trenchant; Mewen Debliquy	Poland; Szymon Nowobilski; Filip Lesniak; Maciej Bartos
2021 Solkan	France; Tanguy Adisson; Mewen Debliquy; Quentin Maillefer	Czech Republic; Adam Král; Martin Kratochvíl; Matyáš Říha	Italy; Martino Barzon; Marino Spagnol; Elio Maiutto
2022 České Budějovice	Slovakia; Jaromír Ivanecký; Samuel Krajčí; Dávid Štaffen	Spain; Marc Vicente; Markel Imaz; Alex Segura Czech Republic; Tomáš Větrovský; Lukáš Kratochvíl; Michal Urban	None awarded
2023 Bratislava	Czech Republic; Lukáš Kratochvíl; Tomáš Větrovský; Filip Jiras	France; Martin Cornu; Elouan Debliquy; Titouan Estanguet	Slovenia; Žiga Lin Hočevar; Matej Trojanšek; Andrej Jeklin
2024 Kraków	France; Martin Cornu; Elouan Debliquy; Titouan Estanguet	Spain; Jan Vicente; Oier Díaz; Azuka Mbelu	Slovakia; Patrik Riegel; Branislav Čársky; Dominik Egyházy
2025 Solkan	France; Léo Ulmer; Titouan Estanguet; Mathéo Senechault	Italy; Riccardo Pontarollo; Lars Aaron Senoner; Dennis Fina	Germany; Jakob Ungvari; Anton Weber; Pascal Brandenburg
2026 Épinal	Czech Republic; Dominik Řežábek; Jáchym Hanzel; Tomáš Indruch	Great Britain; Sid Griffiths; Lewis Arden; Alex Cleator	Germany; Jakob Ungvari; Pascal Brandenburg; Kjell Kadyck

=== Canoe Double (C2) Men Teams ===
Championships	Gold	Silver	Bronze
1995 Liptovský Mikuláš	France; Mathieu Faure/Nicolas Soubiran; Anthony Colin/Mickaël Sabelle; Laurent Bouvard/Sébastien Bouvard	Poland; Andrzej Wójs/Sławomir Mordarski; Konrad Korzeniewski/Jarosław Nawrocki; Krzysztof Nosal/Marek Kowalczyk	Czech Republic; Aleš Daněk/Jindřich Štencl; Lukáš Přinda/Jan Kolář; Jan Rieger/Tomáš Buchnar
1997 Nowy Sącz (non-medal event)	Germany; Marcel Schmidt/Martin Schütze; Marcus Becker/Stefan Henze; Oliver Muschner/Patric Muschner	Poland; Dariusz Wrzosek/Krzysztof Bogatek; Piotr Janik/Tomasz Morawski; Maciej Danek/Roman Cebula	Czech Republic; Jaroslav Volf/Ondřej Štěpánek; Martin Rasner/Jan Hošek; Václav Čvančara/Ivan Hammer
1999 Solkan	France; Sebastien Saget/Julien Paradis; Martin Braud/Cédric Forgit; Remy Gaspard/Julien Gaspard	Poland; Adam Dudziński/Lukasz Piorkowski; Krzysztof Bogatek/Dariusz Wrzosek; Jarosław Miczek/Wojciech Sekuła	Czech Republic; Ondřej Voráč/Radek Hopjan; Lukáš Kubričan/Pavel Kubričan; Ladislav Bouška/Jan Merenus
2001 Bratislava	Germany; Felix Michel/Sebastian Piersig; Karsten Möller/Enrico Scherzer; David Schröder/Philipp Bergner	Poland; Grzegorz Kij/Marcin Kij; Michał Kozial/Jakub Sierota; Marcin Pochwała/Paweł Sarna	Czech Republic; Jan Merenus/Ladislav Bouška; Martin Hammer/Ladislav Vlček; Viktor Vácha/Štěpán Sehnal
2003 Hohenlimburg	Germany; Michael Bartsch/Michael Wiedemann; Daniel Junker/Martin Krenzer; Julius Schröder/Benno Schilling	France; Gauthier Klauss/Matthieu Péché; Aymeric Maynadier/Sébastien Perilhou; François Hémidy/Julien Darcilllon	Czech Republic; Jan Zdráhal/Petr Zdráhal; Martin Hammer/Ladislav Vlček; Viktor Vácha/Štěpán Sehnal
2005 Kraków	Germany; Kai Müller/Kevin Müller; Martin Schmidt/Paul Jork; Michael Greim/Otto-Max Klein	Poland; Dawid Dobrowolski/Piotr Szczepański; Grzegorz Kwiatek/Michał Salamon; Jacek Jancewicz/Piotr Pytel	Slovakia; Marek Vršanský/Richard Vršanský; Lukáš Gajarský/Juraj Ontko; Tomáš Hons/Tomáš Frátrik
2006 Nottingham	Slovenia; Luka Božič/Sašo Taljat; Blaž Oven/Luka Slapšak; Jure Janežič/Anže Janežič	Poland; Dawid Dobrowolski/Dominik Węglarz; Marcin Kasprzak/Karol Kasprzak; Michał Salamon/Grzegorz Kwiatek	France; Hugo Biso/Pierre Picco; Yoan Del Rey/Arthur Grandemange; Jeff Mouroux/Cyril Barbier
2008 Solkan	Czech Republic; Ondřej Karlovský/Jakub Jáně; Robert Gotvald/Jan Vlček; Jonáš Kašpar/Marek Šindler	Germany; Robert Behling/Thomas Becker; Holger Gerdes/Jan-Phillip Eckert; Simon Auerbach/Florian Schubert	Poland; Andrzej Poparda/Kamil Gondek; Patryk Brzeziński/Dariusz Chlebek; Wojciech Pasiut/Kacper Gondek
2009 Liptovský Mikuláš	Poland; Dariusz Chlebek/Patryk Brzeziński; Kamil Gondek/Andrzej Poparda; Filip Brzeziński/Andrzej Brzeziński	Czech Republic; Jonáš Kašpar/Marek Šindler; Martin Říha/Jaroslav Strnad; Jakub Hojda/Tomáš Macášek	Germany; Elias Putz/Sebastian Böhm; Gabriel Holzapfel/Merlin Holzapfel; Holger Gerdes/Jan-Phillip Eckert
2010 Markkleeberg	Poland; Filip Brzeziński/Andrzej Brzeziński; Michał Wiercioch/Grzegorz Majerczak; Przemysław Plewa/Tomasz Kucia	Great Britain; Ryan Westley/George Tatchell; Matthew Holliday/Matthew Evans; Jonathan Shaw/Liam Allwood	Germany; Michel Kerstan/Ansgar Oltmanns; Tom Lorke/Max Gerth; Jan Michael Müller/Marcel Prinz
2011 Banja Luka	Poland; Filip Brzeziński/Andrzej Brzeziński; Michał Wiercioch/Grzegorz Majerczak; Michał Madzio/Adrian Wlazło	Great Britain; Matthew Evans/Matthew Holliday; Jonathan Shaw/Liam Allwood; Barry Kell/Ryan Westley	Russia; Egor Gover/Dmitriy Azanov; Roman Stepanov/Ilia Shaydurov; Pavel Kovalkov/Artem Bogdanov
2012 Solkan	Russia; Dmitriy Azanov/Egor Gover; Aleksei Popov/Vadim Voinalovich; Pavel Kovalkov/Artem Bogdanov	Slovakia; Juraj Skákala/Matúš Gewissler; Martin Šimičák/Jakub Skubík; Igor Michalovič/Jakub Tomko	Czech Republic; Lukáš Rohan/Adam Svoboda; Radek Pospíchal/Marek Cepek; Jakub Franek/Vladimír Zátopek
2013 Bourg-Saint-Maurice	France; Thomas Schmitt/Yann Rivallant; Malo Poles/Baptiste Le Poncin; Antoine Gaillard/Antonin Elne	Czech Republic; Jan Větrovský/Michael Matějka; Jakub Franek/Vladimír Zátopek; Jan Mrázek/Tomáš Rousek	Germany; Hans Krüger/Paul Sommer; Aaron Jüttner/Piet Lennart Wagner; Florian Beste/Sören Loos
2014 Skopje	Germany; Tilman Bayn/Leonard Bayn; Niklas Hecht/Alexander Weber; Paul Grunwald/Timo Trummer	Russia; Igor Mikhailov/Nikolay Shkliaruk; Aleksandr Bashmakov/Viacheslav Siriya; Roman Malyshev/Nikita Kazantsev	Great Britain; Crawford Niven/Angus Gibson; Jacob Holmes/Edward McDiarmid; Robert Harratt/William Smith
2015 Kraków	Germany; Niklas Hecht/Alexander Weber; Lennard Tuchscherer/Fritz Lehrach; Eric Borrmann/Leo Braune	Czech Republic; Jan Větrovský/Michael Matějka; Albert Kašpar/Vojtěch Mrůzek; Jan Mrázek/Tomáš Rousek	Russia; Pavel Kotov/Sergei Komkov; Danil Boyarkin/Dmitrii Khramtsov; Anton Sirotkin/Aleksandr Buinov

=== Kayak (K1) Men Teams ===
Championships	Gold	Silver	Bronze
1995 Liptovský Mikuláš	Czech Republic; Ivan Pišvejc; Tomáš Kobes; Radek Kratochvíl	Germany; Claus Suchanek; Ralf Schaberg; Matthias Urban	Slovenia; Aleš Kuder; Uroš Škander; Matej Gec
1997 Nowy Sącz	Great Britain; James Hounslow; Alan Cardy; Thomas Paterson	Slovakia; Tomáš Turček; Peter Cibák; Tomáš Mráz	Slovenia; Dejan Širme; Uroš Škander; Miha Terdič
1999 Solkan	Germany; René Mühlmann; Sebastian Winter; Thilo Schmitt	France; Julien Billaut; Loris Minvielle; Fabien Lefèvre	Great Britain; Daniel Lomas; Ben Richardson; Richard Hounslow
2001 Bratislava	Germany; Jens Ewald; Erik Pfannmöller; Robert Süssenbach	Czech Republic; Lukáš Kubričan; Jindřich Beneš; Václav Kabrhel	Spain; Marc Domenjó; Ander Diez Lizarribar; Antonio Cadena Sánchez
2003 Hohenlimburg	Germany; Erik Pfannmöller; Alexander Grimm; Andreas Post	Czech Republic; Jindřich Beneš; Vavřinec Hradilek; Michal Buchtel	France; Yoann Portelli; Pierre Bourliaud; Guillaume Lambert
2005 Kraków	France; Sébastien Combot; Benoît Guillaume; Florian Berail	Czech Republic; Vavřinec Hradilek; Vít Přindiš; Jan Vondra	Germany; Sebastian Schubert; Max Pernreiter; Paul Böckelmann
2006 Nottingham	Poland; Łukasz Polaczyk; Jakub Chojnowski; Mateusz Polaczyk	Czech Republic; Vít Přindiš; Tomáš Maslaňák; Jan Vondra	Germany; Stefan Menke; Sebastian Hitz; Sven Brabender
2007 Kraków	France; Vivien Colober; Paul Brier; Étienne Daille	Germany; Nils Winkler; Hannes Aigner; Sebastian Hitz	Czech Republic; Vít Přindiš; Tomáš Maslaňák; Jiří Dupal
2008 Solkan	Poland; Michał Pasiut; Chrystian Półchłopek; Rafał Polaczyk	Czech Republic; Jiří Dupal; Ondřej Zajíc; Ondřej Tunka	Great Britain; Thomas Brady; Zachary Franklin; Toby Jones
2009 Liptovský Mikuláš	Italy; Zeno Ivaldi; Luca Colazingari; Giovanni De Gennaro	Great Britain; Thomas Brady; Joe Clarke; Joseph Coombs	Slovakia; Martin Halčin; Matúš Hujsa; Filip Machaj
2010 Markkleeberg	Czech Republic; Jiří Prskavec; Ondřej Cvikl; Jaroslav Strnad	Great Britain; Joe Clarke; Ciaran Lee Edwards; David Bain	Italy; Lorenzo Veronesi; Zeno Ivaldi; Giovanni De Gennaro
2011 Banja Luka	Slovenia; Martin Srabotnik; Matic Štrukelj; Simon Brus	Poland; Maciej Okręglak; Bartosz Dębowski; Eryk Lejmel	Germany; Stefan Hengst; Johannes Dinkelaker; Samuel Hegge
2012 Solkan	Czech Republic; Petr Binčík; Ondřej Hošek; Matouš Bahenský	Germany; Stefan Hengst; Samuel Hegge; Timon Lutz	Slovakia; Richard Macúš; Miroslav Urban; Andrej Málek
2013 Bourg-Saint-Maurice	Germany; Leo Bolg; David Franke; Felix Merklein	Spain; Jordi Cadena; Unai Nabaskues; Juan Martínez	Poland; Eryk Lejmel; Bartosz Dębowski; Kacper Ćwik
2014 Skopje	Germany; Leo Bolg; Thomas Strauss; Lukas Stahl	Spain; David Llorente; Unai Nabaskues; Jordi Cadena	Poland; Jakub Brzeziński; Wiktor Sandera; Krzysztof Majerczak
2015 Kraków	Slovakia; Jakub Grigar; Richard Macúš; Samuel Stanovský	Poland; Jakub Brzeziński; Wiktor Sandera; Krzysztof Majerczak	Great Britain; Zachary Allin; James Cooper; Christopher Bowers
2016 Solkan	Germany; Thomas Strauss; Noah Hegge; Lukas Stahl	Spain; Eneko Auzmendi; Manuel Ochoa; Nil García	Italy; Jakob Weger; Valentin Luther; Martin Unterthurner
2017 Hohenlimburg	Czech Republic; Tomáš Zima; Josef Žížala; Jan Bárta	Italy; Valentin Luther; Tommaso Fasoli; Davide Ghisetti	Germany; Lukas Stahl; Noah Hegge; Janosch Unseld
2018 Bratislava	France; Anatole Delassus; Vincent Delahaye; Julien Pajaud	Italy; Jakob Luther; Valentin Luther; Leonardo Grimandi	Czech Republic; Tomáš Zima; Jan Bárta; Jakub Krejčí
2019 Liptovský Mikuláš	Germany; Maximilian Dilli; Paul Bretzinger; Tillmann Röller	Slovakia; Matúš Štaffen; Matej Blaščik; Ilja Buran	Spain; Pau Echaniz; Alex Goñi; Adrià Moyano
2020 Kraków	Poland; Tadeusz Kuchno; Michał Ciągło; Mikołaj Mastalski	France; Noe Perreau; Tom Babin; Jean-Charles Hacquart	Russia; Egor Smirnov; Ivan Kozlov; Bogdan Likhachev
2021 Solkan	Russia; Egor Smirnov; Ivan Kozlov; Konstantin Kazakov	Great Britain; Thomas Mayer; Sam Leaver; Cody Brown	Slovakia; Ondrej Macúš; Ilja Buran; Filip Stanko
2022 České Budějovice	Slovenia; Žiga Lin Hočevar; Rene Jeklin; Atej Zobec Urbančič	Germany; Marten Konrad; Enrico Dietz; Christian Stanzel	Italy; Xabier Ferrazzi; Michele Pistoni; Gabriele Grimandi
2023 Bratislava	Germany; Enrico Dietz; Christian Stanzel; Erik Sprotowsky	Slovakia; Daniel Hodas-Pauer; Richard Rumanský; Jakub Ševčík	Slovenia; Atej Zobec Urbančič; Mark Jeklin; Enej Grm
2024 Kraków	France; Martin Cornu; Elouan Debliquy; Titouan Estanguet	Czech Republic; Michal Kopeček; Jáchym Burger; Martin Panzer	Germany; Felix Sachers; Kilian Käding; Paul Lehner
2025 Solkan	Germany; Kilian Käding; Nelian Laryea; Joseph Seibert	France; Titouan Estanguet; Tao Petit; Clément Davy	Czech Republic; Michal Kopeček; Martin Panzer; Jáchym Fröhlich
2026 Épinal	Poland; Marek Kulczycki; Krzysztof Dusik; Wiktor Mazurek	Czech Republic; Tobiáš Novák; Adam Rezek; Šimon Svoboda	France; Théo Chetoui; Riwal Le Ray; Liam Le Touze

=== Canoe Single (C1) Women Teams ===
Championships	Gold	Silver	Bronze
2011 Banja Luka (non-medal event)	Great Britain; Kimberley Woods; Mallory Franklin; Jasmine Royle	Czech Republic; Jana Matulková; Petra Fryšová; Denisa Foltysová	Germany; Tammy Behrendt; Karolin Wagner; Julia Neitz
2012 Solkan (non-medal event)	Czech Republic; Jana Matulková; Anna Koblencová; Barbora Košárková	-	-
2013 Bourg-Saint-Maurice (non-medal event)	France; Charlotte Abba; Lucie Prioux; Laura Ligeon	Czech Republic; Anna Koblencová; Jana Matulková; Barbora Čekalová	-
2014 Skopje	Spain; Miren Lazkano; Annebel van der Knijff; Klara Olazabal	Germany; Birgit Ohmayer; Karolin Wagner; Elena Apel	Czech Republic; Martina Satková; Anna Koblencová; Jana Matulková
2015 Kraków	Czech Republic; Martina Satková; Eva Říhová; Tereza Fišerová	France; Lucie Prioux; Anne-Lise Moisan-Ehrwein; Azénor Philip	Slovakia; Soňa Stanovská; Simona Glejteková; Monika Škáchová
2016 Solkan	Slovakia; Simona Glejteková; Soňa Stanovská; Simona Maceková	Czech Republic; Martina Satková; Tereza Fišerová; Eva Říhová	France; Marjorie Delassus; Fanchon Janssen; Azénor Philip
2017 Hohenlimburg	Slovakia; Simona Glejteková; Soňa Stanovská; Monika Škáchová	Germany; Nele Bayn; Lena Holl; Zoe Jakob	Russia; Daria Kuznetsova; Elizaveta Terekhova; Daria Shaidurova
2018 Bratislava	Czech Republic; Gabriela Satková; Eva Říhová; Tereza Kneblová	Slovakia; Soňa Stanovská; Emanuela Luknárová; Mahuliena Ďurecová	Germany; Zoe Jakob; Nele Bayn; Zola Lewandowski
2019 Liptovský Mikuláš	Italy; Marta Bertoncelli; Elena Borghi; Elena Micozzi	Czech Republic; Gabriela Satková; Tereza Kneblová; Adéla Králová	Slovakia; Emanuela Luknárová; Zuzana Paňková; Ivana Chlebová
2020 Kraków	Czech Republic; Klára Kneblová; Tereza Kneblová; Veronika Janů	France; Doriane Delassus; Camille Castryck; Laurine Salesse	Germany; Zola Lewandowski; Jannemien Panzlaff; Lucie Krech
2021 Solkan	Czech Republic; Tereza Kneblová; Klára Kneblová; Lucie Doležalová	Russia; Marina Novysh; Taisiia Logacheva; Karina Fedchenko	Germany; Lucie Krech; Lena Götze; Paulina Pirro
2022 České Budějovice	Spain; Nora López; Leire Goñi; Malen Gutiérrez	Czech Republic; Klára Kneblová; Adriana Morenová; Olga Samková	Germany; Lucie Krech; Paulina Pirro; Kimberley Rappe
2023 Bratislava	Czech Republic; Julie Štěpánková; Valentýna Kočířová; Natálie Erlová	Great Britain; Zoe Blythe-Shields; Arina Kontchakov; Aimee Collins	Spain; Haizea Segura; Izar García; Anna Simona
2024 Kraków	Czech Republic; Valentýna Kočířová; Markéta Štěpánková; Natálie Erlová	Germany; Neele Krech; Christin Heydenreich; Carolin Diemer	France; Léna Quémérais; Camille Brugvin; Margot Lapeze
2025 Solkan	Czech Republic; Markéta Štěpánková; Valentýna Kočířová; Barbora Ondráčková	Spain; Anna Simona; Ainara Goikoetxea; Ainhoa Segura	Poland; Hanna Danek; Julia Kirkowska; Patrycja Iwaniec
2026 Épinal	France; Margot Lapeze; Laurette Laly; Lili Ulmer	Czech Republic; Markéta Štěpánková; Valentýna Kočířová; Barbora Ondráčková	Germany; Neele Krech; Nova Müller; Maxi Müller

=== Kayak (K1) Women Teams ===
Championships	Gold	Silver	Bronze
1995 Liptovský Mikuláš	France; Lydia Faugeroux; Annaig Pedrono; Marie Gaspard	Czech Republic; Vanda Semerádová; Hana Pešková; Barbora Jirková	Slovakia; Kristýna Mrázová; Gabriela Stacherová; Blanka Lejsalová
1997 Nowy Sącz	Poland; Beata Grzesik; Agnieszka Stanuch; Izabela Szadkowska	Germany; Doreen Böhnisch; Claudia Bär; Jasmin Pitsch	France; Anne-Line Poncet; Samuelle Arnaud; Stéphanie Sohy
1999 Solkan	Slovenia; Tina Sulič; Jana Mali; Nina Mozetič	Czech Republic; Michala Dandová; Petra Semerádová; Marie Řihošková	Germany; Anna Kamps; Ines Gebhard; Jennifer Bongardt
2001 Bratislava	Slovenia; Nina Mozetič; Tina Sulič; Petra Stojilov	Germany; Katharina Volke; Anika Kerkmann; Melanie Gelbhaar	Slovakia; Jana Dukátová; Dana Beňušová; Anna Zererová
2003 Hohenlimburg	Germany; Jasmin Schornberg; Katja Frauenrath; Melanie Pfeifer	Czech Republic; Kateřina Hošková; Zuzana Vybíralová; Petra Slováková	France; Marie-Zélia Lafont; Carole Bouzidi; Clotilde Miclo
2005 Kraków	Germany; Dorothée Utz; Michaela Grimm; Katja Frauenrath	Poland; Natalia Pacierpnik; Alicja Dudek; Agnieszka Nosal	France; Laura Mangin; Elisa Venet; Marie-Zélia Lafont
2006 Nottingham	Germany; Stefanie Horn; Maren Alberti; Cindy Pöschel	Czech Republic; Šárka Blažková; Kateřina Kudějová; Anna Dandová	France; Laura Lyphout; Claire Jacquet; Laura Mangin
2007 Kraków	Czech Republic; Kateřina Kudějová; Eva Ornstová; Veronika Vojtová	Great Britain; Hannah Burgess; Alice Spencer; Claire Kimberley	Poland; Agnieszka Nosal; Anna Ingier; Oliwia Sułkowska
2008 Solkan	Germany; Ricarda Funk; Stefanie Horn; Anne Rosentreter	Slovenia; Nina Slapšak; Dora Domajnko; Eva Terčelj	Great Britain; Claire Kimberley; Emily Woodcock; Bethan Latham
2009 Liptovský Mikuláš	France; Estelle Mangin; Nouria Newman; Gaelle Tosser-Roussey	Great Britain; Natalie Wilson; Claire Kimberley; Bethan Latham	Czech Republic; Anna Bustová; Pavlína Zástěrová; Barbora Valíková
2010 Markkleeberg	Germany; Lisa Fritsche; Caroline Trompeter; Ricarda Funk	Great Britain; Natalie Wilson; Emily Woodcock; Bethan Latham	Czech Republic; Karolína Galušková; Anna Bustová; Pavlína Zástěrová
2011 Banja Luka	Germany; Lisa Fritsche; Caroline Trompeter; Jessica Decker	France; Lucie Baudu; Clémentine Geoffray; Estelle Hellard	Great Britain; Kimberley Woods; Mallory Franklin; Bethan Latham
2012 Solkan	Czech Republic; Karolína Galušková; Sabina Foltysová; Barbora Valíková	Germany; Caroline Trompeter; Anna Faber; Rebecca Plonka	Poland; Monika Liptak; Edyta Węgrzyn; Kamila Urbanik
2013 Bourg-Saint-Maurice	Spain; Julia Cuchi; Miren Lazkano; Annebel van der Knijff	Great Britain; Kimberley Woods; Lauren Strickland; Amy Hollick	Czech Republic; Karolína Galušková; Amálie Hilgertová; Tereza Fišerová
2014 Skopje	Czech Republic; Sabina Foltysová; Amálie Hilgertová; Tereza Fišerová	Germany; Anna Faber; Selina Jones; Andrea Herzog	Spain; Miren Lazkano; Irene Egües; Klara Olazabal
2015 Kraków	Slovakia; Michaela Haššová; Simona Maceková; Lucia Murzová	Czech Republic; Tereza Fišerová; Amálie Hilgertová; Martina Satková	Spain; Miren Lazkano; Irene Egües; Klara Olazabal
2016 Solkan	Czech Republic; Tereza Fišerová; Antonie Galušková; Kateřina Dušková	Slovakia; Michaela Haššová; Soňa Stanovská; Lucia Murzová	Russia; Alsu Minazova; Anastasia Kozyreva; Daria Shaidurova
2017 Hohenlimburg	Czech Republic; Lucie Nesnídalová; Antonie Galušková; Kateřina Beková	France; Romane Prigent; Fanchon Janssen; Anais Bernardy	Russia; Daria Kuznetsova; Elizaveta Terekhova; Daria Shaidurova
2018 Bratislava	Czech Republic; Antonie Galušková; Lucie Nesnídalová; Kateřina Beková	Russia; Elizaveta Terekhova; Daria Shaidurova; Evdokia Podobryaeva	Great Britain; Lois Leaver; Lili Bryant; Nikita Setchell
2019 Liptovský Mikuláš	Czech Republic; Antonie Galušková; Lucie Nesnídalová; Kateřina Beková	France; Emma Vuitton; Doriane Delassus; Eva Pietracha	Slovakia; Zuzana Paňková; Kristína Ďurecová; Ivana Chlebová
2020 Kraków	Germany; Antonia Plochmann; Paulina Pirro; Emily Apel	Slovenia; Eva Alina Hočevar; Helena Domajnko; Zala Zanoškar	Czech Republic; Kateřina Beková; Lucie Nesnídalová; Barbora Karlíková
2021 Solkan	Slovakia; Zuzana Paňková; Ivana Chlebová; Amy Mary Ryan	France; Emma Vuitton; Romane Régnier; Clara Delahaye	Slovenia; Naja Pinterič; Helena Domajnko; Ula Skok
2022 České Budějovice	Czech Republic; Klára Kneblová; Kateřina Švehlová; Olga Samková	Germany; Lucie Krech; Charlotte Wild; Paulina Pirro	France; Nina Pecsce-Roue; Cerise Babin; Clara Delahaye
2023 Bratislava	Czech Republic; Olga Samková; Klára Mrázková; Bára Galušková	Germany; Paulina Pirro; Charlotte Wild; Christin Heydenreich	Spain; Haizea Segura; Ainara Goikoetxea; Anna Simona
2024 Kraków	Czech Republic; Bára Galušková; Markéta Hojdová; Klára Mrázková	Great Britain; Arina Kontchakov; Zoe Blythe-Shields; Sofia Alfer	Slovenia; Naja Pinterič; Ula Skok; Sara Globokar
2025 Solkan	Czech Republic; Markéta Hojdová; Anna Fabianová; Barbora Ondráčková	Spain; Anna Simona; Ainara Goikoetxea; Ainhoa Segura	Germany; Mina Blume; Nova Müller; Britta Jung
2026 Épinal	Czech Republic; Barbora Ondráčková; Valentýna Kočířová; Lucie Vaculová	Germany; Nova Müller; Neele Krech; Britta Jung	France; Margot Lapeze; Laurette Laly; Charlotte Compan
