= 2023 World Junior and U23 Canoe Slalom Championships =

- Venue: Kraków-Kolna Canoe Slalom Course
- Location: Kraków, Poland
- Dates: 15 to 20 August

The 2023 ICF World Junior and U23 Canoe Slalom Championships took place in Kraków, Poland, from 15 to 20 August 2023, under the auspices of the International Canoe Federation (ICF). It was the 24th edition of the competition for the Juniors (U18) and the 11th edition for the Under 23 category.

== Medal summary ==
=== Junior ===
==== Men ====
===== Canoe =====
Event	Gold		Silver		Bronze	
C1	Žiga Lin Hočevar; Slovenia	87.13	Martin Cornu; France	90.39	Lukáš Kratochvíl; Czech Republic	92.08
C1 team	Czech Republic; Lukáš Kratochvíl; Tomáš Větrovský; Filip Jiras	92.79	Germany; Ben Borrmann; Felix Sachers; Niels Zimmermann	94.38	France; Martin Cornu; Elouan Debliquy; Titouan Estanguet	95.93

===== Kayak =====
Event	Gold		Silver		Bronze	
K1	Xabier Ferrazzi; Italy	81.77	Martin Cornu; France	82.27	Žiga Lin Hočevar; Slovenia	83.31
K1 team	Germany; Enrico Dietz; Christian Stanzel; Erik Sprotowsky	89.00	France; Martin Cornu; Ianis Triomphe; Edgar Paleau-Brasseur	91.50	Czech Republic; Matyáš Novák; Marek Bízek; Michal Kopeček	93.45
Kayak cross	Michele Pistoni; Italy		Martin Cornu; France		Kyler James Long; United States	

==== Women ====
===== Canoe =====
Event	Gold		Silver		Bronze	
C1	Paulina Pirro; Germany	99.77	Christin Heydenreich; Germany	102.40	Klára Kneblová; Czech Republic	103.23
C1 team	Czech Republic; Klára Kneblová; Valentýna Kočířová; Natálie Erlová	110.69	Slovenia; Naja Pinterič; Ema Lampič; Asja Jug	116.38	Germany; Paulina Pirro; Christin Heydenreich; Neele Krech	122.80

===== Kayak =====
Event	Gold		Silver		Bronze	
K1	Bára Galušková; Czech Republic	97.98	Klára Kneblová; Czech Republic	98.44	Paulina Pirro; Germany	98.72
K1 team	Czech Republic; Klára Kneblová; Klára Mrázková; Bára Galušková	100.61	Germany; Paulina Pirro; Charlotte Wild; Christin Heydenreich	104.95	Slovenia; Naja Pinterič; Ula Skok; Neja Velišček	110.36
Kayak cross	Klára Kneblová; Czech Republic		Nina Pesce-Roue; France		Codie Davidson; Australia	

=== Under 23 ===
==== Men ====
===== Canoe =====
Event	Gold		Silver		Bronze	
C1	Jules Bernardet; France	89.58	Kurts Rozentals; Great Britain	90.68	Nejc Polenčič; Slovenia	91.24
C1 team	France; Mewen Debliquy; Jules Bernardet; Yohann Senechault	88.13	Great Britain; James Kettle; Peter Linksted; Kurts Rozentals	95.10	Italy; Martino Barzon; Flavio Micozzi; Elio Maiutto	96.21

===== Kayak =====
Event	Gold		Silver		Bronze	
K1	Leo Vuitton; France	81.66	Anatole Delassus; France	82.07	Titouan Castryck; France	82.45
K1 team	France; Leo Vuitton; Titouan Castryck; Anatole Delassus	87.09	Spain; Pau Echaniz; Alex Goñi; Manel Contreras	87.90	Italy; Xabier Ferrazzi; Tommaso Barzon; Leonardo Grimandi	91.04
Kayak cross	Sam Leaver; Great Britain		Nicholas Collier; New Zealand		Jonny Dickson; Great Britain	

==== Women ====
===== Canoe =====
Event	Gold		Silver		Bronze	
C1	Soňa Stanovská; Slovakia	96.55	Tereza Kneblová; Czech Republic	97.12	Evy Leibfarth; United States	97.34
C1 team	Czech Republic; Eva Říhová; Gabriela Satková; Tereza Kneblová	102.30	France; Angèle Hug; Doriane Delassus; Laurène Roisin	106.28	Italy; Elena Borghi; Marta Bertoncelli; Elena Micozzi	107.49

===== Kayak =====
Event	Gold		Silver		Bronze	
K1	Evy Leibfarth; United States	90.24	Antonie Galušková; Czech Republic	91.53	Coline Charel; France	92.88
K1 team	Great Britain; Phoebe Spicer; Lois Leaver; Ellis Miller	98.55	Czech Republic; Lucie Nesnídalová; Antonie Galušková; Gabriela Satková	99.89	Slovenia; Eva Alina Hočevar; Lea Novak; Sara Belingar	109.26
Kayak cross	Kateřina Beková; Czech Republic		Angèle Hug; France		Alena Marx; Switzerland	

== Medal table ==
* Host nation (Poland)

Rank	Nation	Gold	Silver	Bronze	Total
1	Czech Republic (CZE)	7	4	3	14
2	France (FRA)	4	8	3	15
3	Germany (GER)	2	3	2	7
4	Great Britain (GBR)	2	2	1	5
5	Italy (ITA)	2	0	3	5
6	Slovenia (SLO)	1	1	4	6
7	United States (USA)	1	0	2	3
8	Slovakia (SVK)	1	0	0	1
9	New Zealand (NZL)	0	1	0	1
9	Spain (ESP)	0	1	0	1
11	Australia (AUS)	0	0	1	1
11	Switzerland (SUI)	0	0	1	1
Totals (12 entries)		20	20	20	60
