= Elena Borghi =

Italian canoeist (born 2002)

- Borghi in 2024

Personal information
- Nationality: Italian
- Born: 1 June 2002 (age 24)

Sport
- Sport: Canoe slalom
- Event: C1
Medal record
Women's Canoe slalom
Representing Italy
Event	1st	2nd	3rd
European Championships	1	0	1
U23 World Championships	2	1	1
U23 European Championships	1	1	1
Junior World Championships	1	0	1
Junior European Championships	1	1	0
Total	6	3	4
European Championships
Gold medal – first place	2026 Ivrea	C1 team
Bronze medal – third place	2025 Vaires-sur-Marne	C1 team
U23 World Championships
Gold medal – first place	2022 Ivrea	C1
Gold medal – first place	2024 Liptovský Mikuláš	C1 team
Silver medal – second place	2022 Ivrea	C1 team
Bronze medal – third place	2023 Kraków	C1 team
U23 European Championships
Gold medal – first place	2024 Kraków	C1 team
Silver medal – second place	2025 Solkan	C1
Bronze medal – third place	2023 Bratislava	C1 team
Junior World Championships
Gold medal – first place	2019 Kraków	C1 team
Bronze medal – third place	2018 Ivrea	K1 team
Junior European Championships
Gold medal – first place	2019 Liptovský Mikuláš	C1 team
Silver medal – second place	2019 Liptovský Mikuláš	C1

Elena Borghi (born 1 June 2002) is an Italian slalom canoeist who has competed at the international level since 2017.

== Career ==
In July 2022, Borghi competed at the 2022 U23 World Canoe Slalom Championships and won a gold medal in the C1 event with a time of 95.24 seconds, and a silver medal in the C1 team event.

In July 2024, she competed at the 2024 U23 World Canoe Slalom Championships and won a gold medal in the C1 team event, along with Marta Bertoncelli and Elena Micozzi.

In May 2025, she competed at the 2025 European Canoe Slalom Championships and won a bronze medal in the C1 team event, along with Bertoncelli and Micozzi. In September 2026, she competed at the 2026 Paddle Europe Slalom Championships and won a gold medal in the C1 team event, along with Bertoncelli and Micozzi.
