= Elena Micozzi =

Italian canoeist (born 2003)

- Micozzi in 2023

Personal information
- Nationality: Italian
- Born: 5 March 2003 (age 23)

Sport
- Sport: Canoe slalom
- Event: C1
Medal record
Women's Canoe slalom
Representing Italy
| Event | 1st | 2nd | 3rd |
|---|---|---|---|
| European Championships | 1 | 0 | 1 |
| U23 World Championships | 1 | 1 | 2 |
| U23 European Championships | 1 | 1 | 1 |
| Junior World Championships | 2 | 0 | 0 |
| Junior European Championships | 1 | 1 | 0 |
| Total | 6 | 3 | 4 |
European Championships
| Gold medal – first place | 2026 Ivrea | C1 team |
| Bronze medal – third place | 2025 Vaires-sur-Marne | C1 team |
U23 World Championships
| Gold medal – first place | 2024 Liptovský Mikuláš | C1 team |
| Silver medal – second place | 2026 Kraków | C1 |
| Bronze medal – third place | 2023 Kraków | C1 team |
| Bronze medal – third place | 2026 Kraków | C1 team |
U23 European Championships
| Gold medal – first place | 2024 Kraków | C1 team |
| Silver medal – second place | 2026 Épinal | C1 |
| Bronze medal – third place | 2023 Bratislava | C1 team |
Junior World Championships
| Gold medal – first place | 2018 Ivrea | Mixed C2 |
| Gold medal – first place | 2019 Kraków | C1 team |
Junior European Championships
| Gold medal – first place | 2019 Liptovský Mikuláš | C1 team |
| Silver medal – second place | 2021 Solkan | C1 |

Elena Micozzi (born 5 March 2003) is an Italian slalom canoeist who has competed at the international level since 2018.

== Career ==
Micozzi competed at the 2018 World Junior Canoe Slalom Championships and won a gold medal in the mixed C2 event, along with her brother, Flavio Micozzi.

In July 2021, she competed at the 2021 World Junior Canoe Slalom Championships and finished in seventh place in the C1 event. The next month she competed at the 2021 European Junior Canoe Slalom Championships and won a silver medal in the C1 event with a time of 111.08 seconds.

She represented Italy at the 2023 European Games and finished in seventh place in the C1 event with a time of 119.24 seconds.

In May 2025, she competed at the 2025 European Canoe Slalom Championships and won a bronze medal in the C1 team event, along with Marta Bertoncelli and Elena Borghi.

In July 2026, she competed at the 2026 U23 World Canoe Slalom Championships and won a silver medal in the C1 event with a time of 108.31 seconds, and a bronze medal in the C1 team event. The next month she competed at the 2026 U23 European Canoe Slalom Championships and won a silver medal in the C1 event with a time of 100.80 seconds, finishing 0.03 seconds behind gold medalist Christin Heydenreich. In September 2026, she competed at the 2026 Paddle Europe Slalom Championships and won a gold medal in the C1 team event, along with Bertoncelli and Borghi.

== Personal life ==
Micozzi's older brother, Flavio Micozzi, is also a slalom canoeist.
