= 2019 European Junior and U23 Canoe Slalom Championships =

Canoeing and kayaking competition in Slovakia

- Location: Liptovský Mikuláš, Slovakia

The 2019 European Junior and U23 Canoe Slalom Championships took place in Liptovský Mikuláš, Slovakia from 4 to 7 July 2019 under the auspices of the European Canoe Association (ECA) at the Ondrej Cibak Whitewater Slalom Course. It was the 21st edition of the competition for Juniors (U18) and the 17th edition for the Under 23 category. A total of 16 medal events took place, 8 in each of the two age categories.

== Medal summary ==
=== Men ===
==== Canoe ====
===== Junior =====
Event	Gold		Silver		Bronze	
C1	Yohann Senechault; France	97.75	Martin Kratochvíl; Czech Republic	102.54	Adam Král; Czech Republic	104.32
C1 team	Slovakia; Ľudovít Macúš; Juraj Mráz; Juraj Dieška	120.21	Czech Republic; Kryštof Lhota; Adam Král; Martin Kratochvíl	120.42	Germany; Benjamin Kies; Julian Lindolf; Felix Göttling	125.54

===== U23 =====
Event	Gold		Silver		Bronze	
C1	Nicolas Gestin; France	93.81	Marko Mirgorodský; Slovakia	94.06	Lucas Roisin; France	96.73
C1 team	Italy; Raffaello Ivaldi; Paolo Ceccon; Flavio Micozzi	107.90	Czech Republic; Vojtěch Heger; Václav Chaloupka; Jan Větrovský	109.33	Slovenia; Urh Turnšek; Klemen Vidmar; Tine Kancler	109.86

==== Kayak ====
===== Junior =====
Event	Gold		Silver		Bronze	
K1	Anatole Delassus; France	89.68	Pau Echaniz; Spain	91.26	Etienne Chappell; Great Britain	94.75
K1 team	Germany; Maximilian Dilli; Paul Bretzinger; Tillmann Röller	109.43	Slovakia; Matúš Štaffen; Matej Blaščik; Ilja Buran	116.03	Spain; Pau Echaniz; Alex Goñi; Adrià Moyano	116.82

===== U23 =====
Event	Gold		Silver		Bronze	
K1	Jakub Grigar; Slovakia	87.80	Tomáš Zima; Czech Republic	89.15	Sergey Maimistov; Russia	89.40
K1 team	France; Mathurin Madoré; Pol Oulhen; Malo Quéméneur	97.94	Austria; Mario Leitner; Felix Oschmautz; Matthias Weger	100.14	Czech Republic; Tomáš Zima; Alexandr Maikranz; Michael Matějka	100.98

=== Women ===
==== Canoe ====
===== Junior =====
Event	Gold		Silver		Bronze	
C1	Gabriela Satková; Czech Republic	106.48	Elena Borghi; Italy	109.42	Bethan Forrow; Great Britain	111.77
C1 team	Italy; Marta Bertoncelli; Elena Borghi; Elena Micozzi	129.72	Czech Republic; Gabriela Satková; Tereza Kneblová; Adéla Králová	139.78	Slovakia; Emanuela Luknárová; Zuzana Paňková; Ivana Chlebová	142.54

===== U23 =====
Event	Gold		Silver		Bronze	
C1	Marjorie Delassus; France	109.00	Martina Satková; Czech Republic	110.45	Tereza Fišerová; Czech Republic	112.30
C1 team	France; Marjorie Delassus; Margaux Henry; Ella Bregazzi	132.37	Czech Republic; Tereza Fišerová; Eva Říhová; Martina Satková	135.08	Slovakia; Soňa Stanovská; Monika Škáchová; Simona Maceková	136.24

==== Kayak ====
===== Junior =====
Event	Gold		Silver		Bronze	
K1	Kateřina Beková; Czech Republic	105.84	Antonie Galušková; Czech Republic	107.43	Francesca Malaguti; Italy	107.55
K1 team	Czech Republic; Antonie Galušková; Lucie Nesnídalová; Kateřina Beková	125.01	France; Emma Vuitton; Doriane Delassus; Eva Pietracha	126.98	Slovakia; Zuzana Paňková; Kristína Ďurecová; Ivana Chlebová	129.26

===== U23 =====
Event	Gold		Silver		Bronze	
K1	Tereza Fišerová; Czech Republic	99.17	Klaudia Zwolińska; Poland	100.69	Eliška Mintálová; Slovakia	103.10
K1 team	Czech Republic; Amálie Hilgertová; Tereza Fišerová; Gabriela Satková	118.84	Slovakia; Eliška Mintálová; Soňa Stanovská; Simona Maceková	122.83	Germany; Anna Faber; Stella Mehlhorn; Selina Jones	124.73

== Medal table ==
Rank	Nation	Gold	Silver	Bronze	Total
1	France (FRA)	6	1	1	8
2	Czech Republic (CZE)	5	8	3	16
3	Slovakia (SVK)	2	3	4	9
4	Italy (ITA)	2	1	1	4
5	Germany (GER)	1	0	2	3
6	Spain (ESP)	0	1	1	2
7	Austria (AUT)	0	1	0	1
7	Poland (POL)	0	1	0	1
9	Great Britain (GBR)	0	0	2	2
10	Russia (RUS)	0	0	1	1
10	Slovenia (SLO)	0	0	1	1
Totals (11 entries)		16	16	16	48
