= Xabier Ferrazzi =

Italian canoe slalom athlete

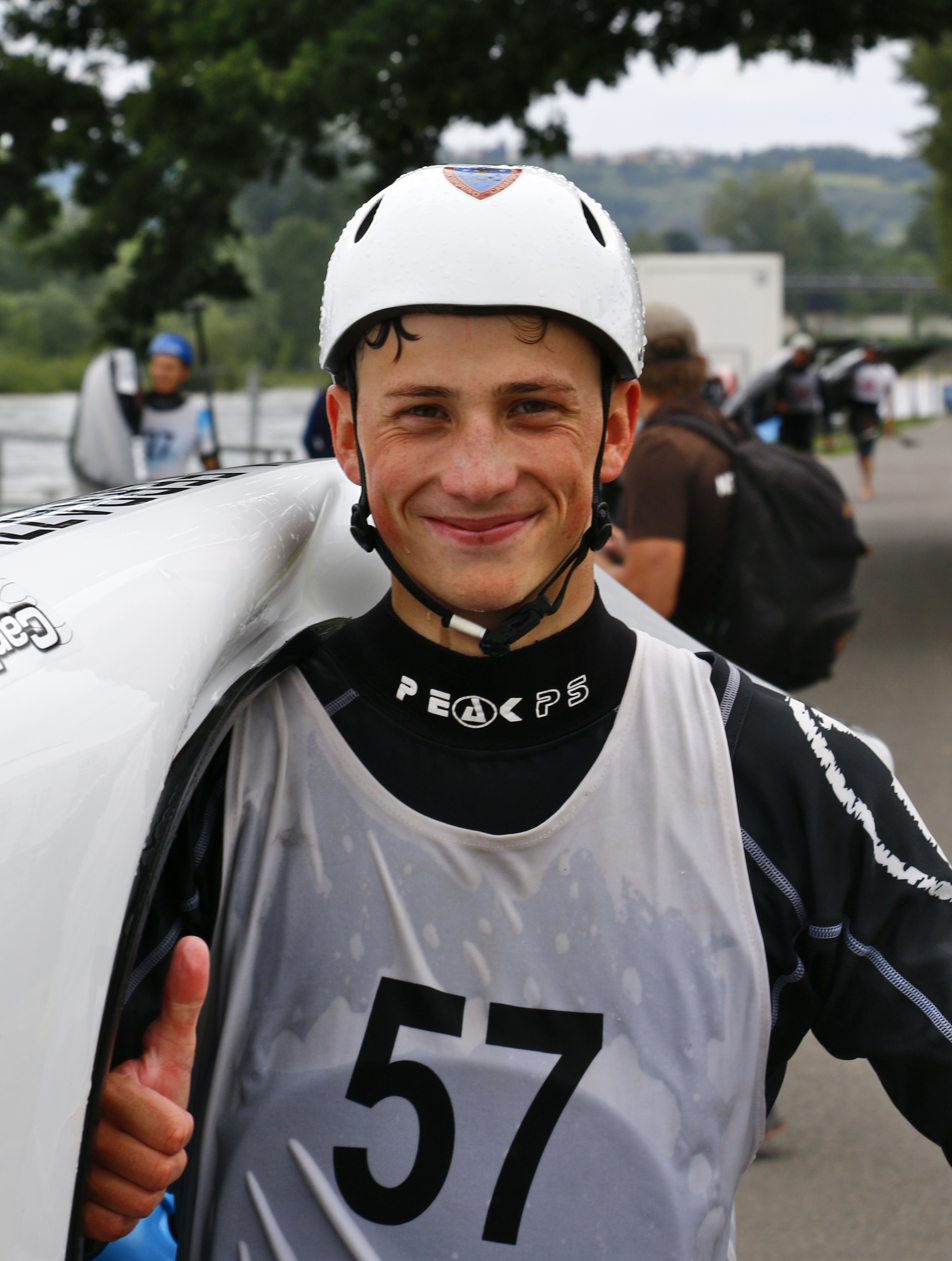

Personal information
- Nationality: Italian
- Born: 28 July 2005 (age 21) Bassano del Grappa
- Height: 175 cm (5 ft 9 in)
- Weight: 65 kg (143 lb)

Sport
- Country: Italy
- Sport: Canoe slalom
- Event: K1, Kayak cross
- Club: Centro Sportivo Carabinieri
Medal record
Men's canoe slalom
Representing Italy
European Championships
| Silver medal – second place | 2026 Ivrea | K1 |
U23 World Championships
| Silver medal – second place | 2025 Foix | K1 |
| Silver medal – second place | 2026 Kraków | K1 team |
| Bronze medal – third place | 2023 Kraków | K1 team |
| Bronze medal – third place | 2024 Liptovský Mikuláš | K1 team |
| Bronze medal – third place | 2025 Foix | Kayak cross |
Junior World Championships
| Gold medal – first place | 2023 Kraków | K1 |
U23 European Championships
| Bronze medal – third place | 2024 Kraków | K1 team |
Junior European Championships
| Silver medal – second place | 2023 Bratislava | K1 |
| Bronze medal – third place | 2022 České Budějovice | K1 team |

Xabier Ferrazzi (born 28 July 2005) is an Italian canoe slalom athlete who has competed at the international level since 2022.

Ferrazzi is the overall World Cup champion in K1 from 2026. He won a silver medal in the K1 event at the 2026 European Championships in Ivrea.

He is the 2023 Junior K1 World Champion. 2025 U23 K1 Vice World Champion In 2025 he finished the year ranked 6th in the World Cup standings. He placed 4th at the 2025 European Championships.

His father Pierpaolo Ferrazzi won gold at the 1992 Summer Olympics in the K1 event.

== World Cup individual podiums ==
| Season | Date | Venue | Position | Event |
|---|---|---|---|---|
| 2026 | 29 May 2026 | Tacen | 1st | K1 |
| 2026 | 5 June 2026 | Prague | 3rd | K1 |
| 2026 | 12 June 2026 | Augsburg | 3rd | K1 |
| 2026 | 11 September 2026 | La Seu d'Urgell | 2nd | K1 |

== Sources ==
- Diamantini, Edoardo (November 26, 2024). "Xabier Ferrazzi: "Con De Gennaro sarà una bella lotta per Los Angeles 2028. È il mio punto di riferimento"". OA Sport.
- "Triade di bronzi ai mondiali di canoa, i fratelli Micozzi sulle vette del mondo". August 16, 2023.
- Spagnuolo, Ilaria (June 14, 2024). "COPPA DEL MONDO: XABIER FERRAZZI SFIORA IL PODIO, QUARTO NELLA FINALE DEL K1". Federazione Italiana Canoa Kayak.
