= Niko Testen =

Slovenian slalom canoeist

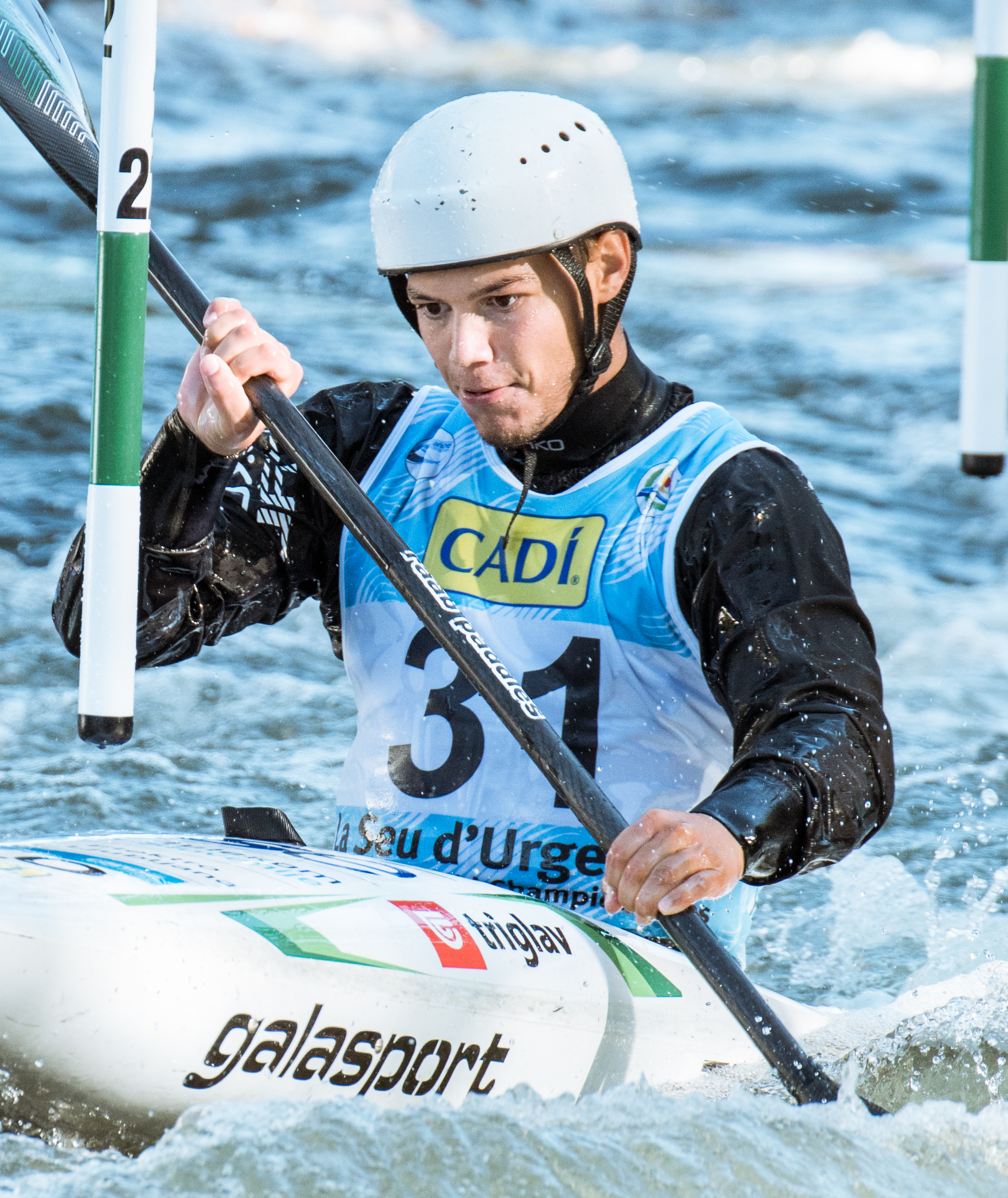

Personal information
- Nationality: Slovenian
- Born: 1 April 1997 (age 29)

Sport
- Country: Slovenia
- Sport: Canoe slalom
- Event: K1, C2
Medal record
Men's canoe slalom
Representing Slovenia
World Championships
Bronze medal – third place	2021 Bratislava	K1 team
European Championships
Silver medal – second place	2019 Pau	K1 team
Bronze medal – third place	2018 Prague	K1 team
U23 World Championships
Silver medal – second place	2019 Kraków	K1 team
U23 European Championships
Gold medal – first place	2018 Bratislava	K1 team
Junior European Championships
Gold medal – first place	2015 Kraków	K1
Silver medal – second place	2013 Bourg-Saint-Maurice	C2
Bronze medal – third place	2014 Skopje	K1

Niko Testen (born 1 April 1997) is a Slovenian slalom canoeist who has competed at the international level since 2012.

He won a bronze medal in the K1 team event at the 2021 World Championships in Bratislava.
