= 2023 European Junior and U23 Canoe Slalom Championships =

- Venue: Čunovo Water Sports Centre
- Location: Bratislava, Slovakia
- Dates: 20 to 23 July

The 2023 European Junior and U23 Canoe Slalom Championships took place in Bratislava, Slovakia from 20 to 23 July 2023 under the auspices of the European Canoe Association (ECA). It was the 25th edition of the competition for the Juniors (U18) and the 21st edition for the Under 23 category.

== Medal summary ==
=== Men ===
==== Canoe ====
===== Junior =====
Event	Gold		Silver		Bronze	
C1	Filip Jiras; Czech Republic	99.20	Elouan Debliquy; France	99.80	Lukáš Kratochvíl; Czech Republic	100.60
C1 team	Czech Republic; Lukáš Kratochvíl; Tomáš Větrovský; Filip Jiras	103.30	France; Martin Cornu; Elouan Debliquy; Titouan Estanguet	103.82	Slovenia; Žiga Lin Hočevar; Matej Trojanšek; Andrej Jeklin	110.26

===== U23 =====
Event	Gold		Silver		Bronze	
C1	Yohann Senechault; France	93.59	Vojtěch Heger; Czech Republic	94.86	Peter Linksted; Great Britain	95.13
C1 team	Great Britain; James Kettle; Peter Linksted; Kurts Rozentals	100.37	France; Mewen Debliquy; Yohann Senechault; Adrien Fischer	100.92	Slovenia; Juš Javornik; Nejc Polenčič; Žiga Lin Hočevar	102.31

==== Kayak ====
===== Junior =====
Event	Gold		Silver		Bronze	
K1	Martin Cornu; France	90.11	Xabier Ferrazzi; Italy	90.54	Žiga Lin Hočevar; Slovenia	90.99
K1 team	Germany; Enrico Dietz; Christian Stanzel; Erik Sprotowsky	98.51	Slovakia; Daniel Hodas-Pauer; Richard Rumanský; Jakub Ševčík	102.10	Slovenia; Atej Zobec Urbančič; Mark Jeklin; Enej Grm	102.32
Kayak cross	Moritz Kremslehner; Austria		Lukáš Kratochvíl; Czech Republic		Martin Cornu; France	

===== U23 =====
Event	Gold		Silver		Bronze	
K1	Miquel Travé; Spain	86.72	Jakub Krejčí; Czech Republic	87.68	Leo Vuitton; France	87.97
K1 team	Spain; Pau Echaniz; Miquel Travé; Alex Goñi	90.35	France; Anatole Delassus; Vincent Delahaye; Leo Vuitton	90.41	Great Britain; Ben Haylett; Sam Leaver; David Paterson	94.02
Kayak cross	Anatole Delassus; France		Sam Leaver; Great Britain		Vincent Delahaye; France	

=== Women ===
==== Canoe ====
===== Junior =====
Event	Gold		Silver		Bronze	
C1	Neele Krech; Germany	114.74	Naja Pinterič; Slovenia	116.81	Paulina Pirro; Germany	120.50
C1 team	Czech Republic; Julie Štěpánková; Valentýna Kočířová; Natálie Erlová	120.96	Great Britain; Zoe Blythe-Shields; Arina Kontchakov; Aimee Collins	147.66	Spain; Haizea Segura; Izar García; Anna Simona	162.65

===== U23 =====
Event	Gold		Silver		Bronze	
C1	Gabriela Satková; Czech Republic	99.99	Zuzana Paňková; Slovakia	103.75	Doriane Delassus; France	104.37
C1 team	Czech Republic; Eva Říhová; Gabriela Satková; Tereza Kneblová	111.20	Slovakia; Zuzana Paňková; Emanuela Luknárová; Soňa Stanovská	116.68	Italy; Marta Bertoncelli; Elena Micozzi; Elena Borghi	117.19

==== Kayak ====
===== Junior =====
Event	Gold		Silver		Bronze	
K1	Paulina Pirro; Germany	102.14	Olga Samková; Czech Republic	105.51	Charlotte Wild; Germany	106.88
K1 team	Czech Republic; Olga Samková; Klára Mrázková; Bára Galušková	114.50	Germany; Paulina Pirro; Charlotte Wild; Christin Heydenreich	120.90	Spain; Haizea Segura; Ainara Goikoetxea; Anna Simona	125.51
Kayak cross	Bára Galušková; Czech Republic		Naja Pinterič; Slovenia		Hannah Rhodes; Great Britain	

===== U23 =====
Event	Gold		Silver		Bronze	
K1	Lucie Nesnídalová; Czech Republic	99.30	Antonie Galušková; Czech Republic	99.92	Lea Novak; Slovenia	101.12
K1 team	France; Doriane Delassus; Eva Pietracha; Coline Charel	102.80	Slovakia; Ivana Chlebová; Zuzana Paňková; Soňa Stanovská	104.23	Slovenia; Eva Alina Hočevar; Lea Novak; Sara Belingar	107.68
Kayak cross	Doriane Delassus; France		Zuzana Paňková; Slovakia		Emily Apel; Germany	

== Medal table ==
* Host nation (Slovakia)

Rank	Nation	Gold	Silver	Bronze	Total
1	Czech Republic (CZE)	8	5	1	14
2	France (FRA)	5	4	4	13
3	Germany (GER)	3	1	3	7
4	Spain (ESP)	2	0	2	4
5	Great Britain (GBR)	1	2	3	6
6	Austria (AUT)	1	0	0	1
7	Slovakia (SVK)*	0	5	0	5
8	Slovenia (SLO)	0	2	6	8
9	Italy (ITA)	0	1	1	2
Totals (9 entries)		20	20	20	60
