= 2022 European Junior and U23 Canoe Slalom Championships =

- Location: České Budějovice, Czech Republic
- Dates: 11 to 14 August 2022

The 2022 European Junior and U23 Canoe Slalom Championships took place in České Budějovice, Czech Republic from 11 to 14 August 2022 under the auspices of the European Canoe Association (ECA). It was the 24th edition of the competition for Juniors (U18) and the 20th edition for the Under 23 category. The Czech Republic hosted the event for the first time. A total of 20 medal events were held.

Russia and Belarus were excluded from participation due to the 2022 Russian invasion of Ukraine.

== Medal summary ==
=== Men ===
==== Canoe ====
===== Junior =====
Event	Gold		Silver		Bronze	
C1	Samuel Krajčí; Slovakia	90.31	Žiga Lin Hočevar; Slovenia	91.58	Markel Imaz; Spain	92.42
C1 team	Slovakia; Jaromír Ivanecký; Samuel Krajčí; Dávid Štaffen	119.42	Spain; Marc Vicente; Markel Imaz; Alex Segura Czech Republic; Tomáš Větrovský; Lukáš Kratochvíl; Michal Urban	123.20	None awarded	

===== U23 =====
Event	Gold		Silver		Bronze	
C1	Vojtěch Heger; Czech Republic	82.83	Mewen Debliquy; France	83.31	Lennard Tuchscherer; Germany	84.13
C1 team	Slovenia; Nejc Polenčič; Juš Javornik; Žiga Lin Hočevar	107.47	Great Britain; Peter Linksted; James Kettle; Kurts Rozentals	109.24	Poland; Kacper Sztuba; Szymon Nowobilski; Konrad Szymanek	110.29

==== Kayak ====
===== Junior =====
Event	Gold		Silver		Bronze	
K1	Titouan Castryck; France	81.47	Žiga Lin Hočevar; Slovenia	82.26	Richard Rumanský; Slovakia	82.88
K1 team	Slovenia; Žiga Lin Hočevar; Rene Jeklin; Atej Zobec Urbančič	106.69	Germany; Marten Konrad; Enrico Dietz; Christian Stanzel	119.10	Italy; Xabier Ferrazzi; Michele Pistoni; Gabriele Grimandi	123.61
Extreme	Titouan Castryck; France		Martin Cornu; France		Edward McDonald; Great Britain	

===== U23 =====
Event	Gold		Silver		Bronze	
K1	Jakub Krejčí; Czech Republic	79.05	Miquel Travé; Spain	80.83	Joshua Dietz; Germany	81.30
K1 team	France; Simon Hene; Anatole Delassus; Pierre Louis Saussereau	99.93	Spain; Miquel Travé; Pau Echaniz; Darío Cuesta	104.25	Great Britain; Jonny Dickson; Ben Haylett; Etienne Chappell	105.98
Extreme	Pau Echaniz; Spain		Anatole Delassus; France		Gaël Adisson; France	

=== Women ===
==== Canoe ====
===== Junior =====
Event	Gold		Silver		Bronze	
C1	Klára Kneblová; Czech Republic	95.03	Adriana Morenová; Czech Republic	104.13	Lucie Krech; Germany	107.20
C1 team	Spain; Nora López; Leire Goñi; Malen Gutiérrez	145.00	Czech Republic; Klára Kneblová; Adriana Morenová; Olga Samková	148.42	Germany; Lucie Krech; Paulina Pirro; Kimberley Rappe	152.51

===== U23 =====
Event	Gold		Silver		Bronze	
C1	Gabriela Satková; Czech Republic	91.59	Tereza Kneblová; Czech Republic	94.07	Fanchon Janssen; France	97.30
C1 team	Czech Republic; Gabriela Satková; Eva Říhová; Tereza Kneblová	128.45	Germany; Hannah Süss; Zoe Jakob; Jannemien Panzlaff	138.83	Great Britain; Bethan Forrow; Sophie Ogilvie; Ellis Miller	139.13

==== Kayak ====
===== Junior =====
Event	Gold		Silver		Bronze	
K1	Paulina Pirro; Germany	91.89	Olga Samková; Czech Republic	94.00	Maite Odriozola; Spain	96.05
K1 team	Czech Republic; Klára Kneblová; Kateřina Švehlová; Olga Samková	128.95	Germany; Lucie Krech; Charlotte Wild; Paulina Pirro	136.86	France; Nina Pecsce-Roue; Cerise Babin; Clara Delahaye	145.43
Extreme	Olga Samková; Czech Republic		Naja Pinterič; Slovenia		Arina Kontchakov; Great Britain	

===== U23 =====
Event	Gold		Silver		Bronze	
K1	Antonie Galušková; Czech Republic	88.88	Angèle Hug; France	89.35	Emily Apel; Germany	90.82
K1 team	Germany; Annkatrin Plochmann; Emily Apel; Franziska Hanke	118.08	France; Romane Prigent; Emma Vuitton; Angèle Hug	118.43	Great Britain; Megan Hamer-Evans; Phoebe Spicer; Lois Leaver	125.97
Extreme	Eva Alina Hočevar; Slovenia		Olatz Arregui; Spain		Eva Pietracha; France	

== Medal table ==
* Host nation (Czech Republic)

Rank	Nation	Gold	Silver	Bronze	Total
1	Czech Republic (CZE)*	8	5	0	13
2	France (FRA)	3	5	4	12
3	Slovenia (SLO)	3	3	0	6
4	Spain (ESP)	2	4	2	8
5	Germany (GER)	2	3	5	10
6	Slovakia (SVK)	2	0	1	3
7	Great Britain (GBR)	0	1	5	6
8	Italy (ITA)	0	0	1	1
8	Poland (POL)	0	0	1	1
Totals (9 entries)		20	21	19	60
