= 2024 European Junior and U23 Canoe Slalom Championships =

- Venue: Kraków-Kolna Canoe Slalom Course
- Location: Kraków, Poland
- Dates: 15 to 18 August

The 2024 European Junior and U23 Canoe Slalom Championships took place in Kraków, Poland from 15 to 18 August 2024 under the auspices of the European Canoe Association (ECA). It was the 26th edition of the competition for the Juniors (U18) and the 22nd edition for the Under 23 category.

Kraków hosted the event for the 6th time. Previously the championships took place in Kraków in 2004, 2005, 2007, 2015 and 2020.

24 sets of medals were awarded, 12 in each age group. There were 8 canoe and 16 kayak events, including a brand new event called kayak cross individual, which also served as the qualification for the kayak cross elimination races.

== Medal summary ==
=== Junior ===
==== Men ====
===== Canoe =====
Event	Gold		Silver		Bronze	
C1	Žiga Lin Hočevar; Slovenia	93.32	Martin Cornu; France	96.44	Matej Trojanšek; Slovenia	96.83
C1 team	France; Martin Cornu; Elouan Debliquy; Titouan Estanguet	110.11	Spain; Jan Vicente; Oier Díaz; Azuka Mbelu	120.66	Slovakia; Patrik Riegel; Branislav Čársky; Dominik Egyházy	122.02

===== Kayak =====
Event	Gold		Silver		Bronze	
K1	Martin Cornu; France	84.78	Žiga Lin Hočevar; Slovenia	85.20	Michele Pistoni; Italy	87.37
K1 team	France; Martin Cornu; Elouan Debliquy; Titouan Estanguet	108.81	Czech Republic; Michal Kopeček; Jáchym Burger; Martin Panzer	110.50	Germany; Felix Sachers; Kilian Käding; Paul Lehner	113.29
Kayak cross individual	Martin Cornu; France	64.86	Michele Pistoni; Italy	66.04	Jonah Hanrahan; Great Britain	66.45
Kayak cross	Filip Duda; Slovakia		Jáchym Burger; Czech Republic		Žiga Lin Hočevar; Slovenia	

==== Women ====
===== Canoe =====
Event	Gold		Silver		Bronze	
C1	Valentýna Kočířová; Czech Republic	110.11	Arina Kontchakov; Great Britain	110.24	Christin Heydenreich; Germany	112.73
C1 team	Czech Republic; Valentýna Kočířová; Markéta Štěpánková; Natálie Erlová	140.11	Germany; Neele Krech; Christin Heydenreich; Carolin Diemer	153.02	France; Léna Quémérais; Camille Brugvin; Margot Lapeze	157.04

===== Kayak =====
Event	Gold		Silver		Bronze	
K1	Hanna Danek; Poland	100.34	Bára Galušková; Czech Republic	101.86	Markéta Hojdová; Czech Republic	102.86
K1 team	Czech Republic; Bára Galušková; Markéta Hojdová; Klára Mrázková	123.39	Great Britain; Arina Kontchakov; Zoe Blythe-Shields; Sofia Alfer	129.03	Slovenia; Naja Pinterič; Ula Skok; Sara Globokar	132.43
Kayak cross individual	Klára Mrázková; Czech Republic	71.60	Eyleen Vuilleumier; Switzerland	73.31	Naja Pinterič; Slovenia	73.61
Kayak cross	Mina Blume; Germany		Arina Kontchakov; Great Britain		Haizea Segura; Spain	

=== Under 23 ===
==== Men ====
===== Canoe =====
Event	Gold		Silver		Bronze	
C1	Mewen Debliquy; France	88.40	Adam Král; Czech Republic	90.17	Kurts Rozentals; Great Britain	92.61
C1 team	Slovenia; Žiga Lin Hočevar; Nejc Polenčič; Juš Javornik	108.69	France; Mewen Debliquy; Yohann Senechault; Tanguy Adisson	112.96	Great Britain; Edward McDonald; Luc Royle; Kurts Rozentals	117.06

===== Kayak =====
Event	Gold		Silver		Bronze	
K1	Ben Haylett; Great Britain	85.20	Leo Vuitton; France	85.94	Edgar Paleau-Brasseur; France	86.29
K1 team	Great Britain; Sam Leaver; Ben Haylett; Jonny Dickson	106.44	France; Anatole Delassus; Leo Vuitton; Edgar Paleau-Brasseur	108.79	Italy; Xabier Ferrazzi; Gabriele Grimandi; Tommaso Panico	109.05
Kayak cross individual	Leo Vuitton; France	64.80	Oleksandr Fedorenko; Ukraine	64.83	Anatole Delassus; France	64.93
Kayak cross	Miquel Farran; Spain		Sam Leaver; Great Britain		Anatole Delassus; France	

==== Women ====
===== Canoe =====
Event	Gold		Silver		Bronze	
C1	Eva Alina Hočevar; Slovenia	99.91	Ellis Miller; Great Britain	102.96	Emanuela Luknárová; Slovakia	104.46
C1 team	Italy; Marta Bertoncelli; Elena Micozzi; Elena Borghi	125.54	Czech Republic; Klára Kneblová; Adriana Morenová; Tereza Kneblová	127.96	France; Camille Castryck; Doriane Delassus; Nina Pesce-Roue	133.95

===== Kayak =====
Event	Gold		Silver		Bronze	
K1	Eva Pietracha; France	94.56	Lucie Nesnídalová; Czech Republic	96.12	Eva Alina Hočevar; Slovenia	96.52
K1 team	France; Emma Vuitton; Eva Pietracha; Ilona Martin Laemle	122.59	Germany; Antonia Plochmann; Emily Apel; Paulina Pirro	126.13	Czech Republic; Lucie Nesnídalová; Kateřina Beková; Klára Kneblová	126.21
Kayak cross individual	Lois Leaver; Great Britain	69.48	Doriane Delassus; France	70.46	Emma Vuitton; France	70.48
Kayak cross	Doriane Delassus; France		Lois Leaver; Great Britain		Tereza Kneblová; Czech Republic	

== Medal table ==
* Host nation (Poland)

Rank	Nation	Gold	Silver	Bronze	Total
1	France (FRA)	9	5	6	20
2	Czech Republic (CZE)	4	6	3	13
3	Great Britain (GBR)	3	6	3	12
4	Slovenia (SLO)	3	1	5	9
5	Germany (GER)	1	2	2	5
6	Italy (ITA)	1	1	2	4
7	Spain (ESP)	1	1	1	3
8	Slovakia (SVK)	1	0	2	3
9	Poland (POL)*	1	0	0	1
10	Switzerland (SUI)	0	1	0	1
10	Ukraine (UKR)	0	1	0	1
Totals (11 entries)		24	24	24	72
