= Kateřina Beková =

Czech canoeist (born 2002)

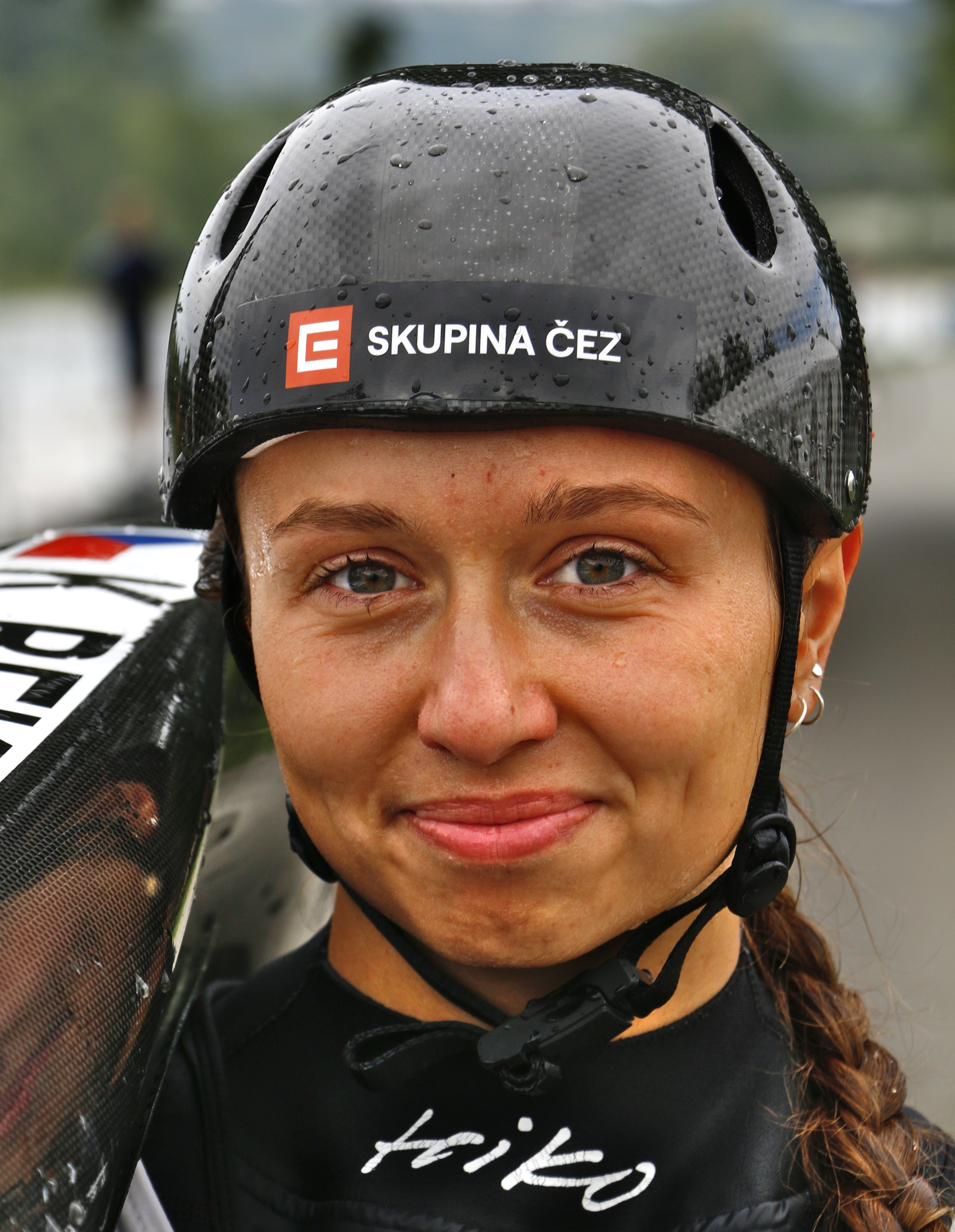
- Beková in 2024

Personal information
- Nationality: Czech
- Born: 2 August 2002 (age 24) Boskovice, Czech Republic

Sport
- Country: Czechia
- Sport: Canoe slalom
- Event: K1, Kayak cross
Medal record
Women's Canoe slalom
Representing Czech Republic
Event	1st	2nd	3rd
World Championships	0	1	0
European Championships	0	0	1
U23 World Championships	2	0	4
U23 European Championships	1	1	1
Junior World Championships	2	1	1
Junior European Championships	4	0	2
Total	9	3	9
World Championships
Silver medal – second place	2026 Oklahoma City	Kayak cross individual
European Championships
Bronze medal – third place	2024 Tacen	K1 team
U23 World Championships
Gold medal – first place	2023 Kraków	Kayak cross
Gold medal – first place	2025 Foix	K1 team
Bronze medal – third place	2024 Liptovský Mikuláš	K1
Bronze medal – third place	2024 Liptovský Mikuláš	Kayak cross
Bronze medal – third place	2024 Liptovský Mikuláš	K1 team
Bronze medal – third place	2025 Foix	Kayak cross
U23 European Championships
Gold medal – first place	2025 Solkan	K1 team
Silver medal – second place	2025 Solkan	Kayak cross individual
Bronze medal – third place	2024 Kraków	K1 team
Junior World Championships
Gold medal – first place	2018 Ivrea	Kayak cross
Gold medal – first place	2018 Ivrea	K1 team
Silver medal – second place	2019 Kraków	K1 team
Bronze medal – third place	2019 Kraków	Kayak cross
Junior European Championships
Gold medal – first place	2017 Hohenlimburg	K1 team
Gold medal – first place	2018 Bratislava	K1 team
Gold medal – first place	2019 Liptovský Mikuláš	K1
Gold medal – first place	2019 Liptovský Mikuláš	K1 team
Bronze medal – third place	2020 Kraków	K1
Bronze medal – third place	2020 Kraków	K1 team

Kateřina Beková (born 2 August 2002) is a Czech slalom canoeist who has competed at the international level since 2017, specializing in K1 and kayak cross.

== Career ==
Beková competed at the 2024 U23 World Championships and won bronze medals in the K1, K1 team, and kayak cross events. In July 2025, she again competed at the 2025 U23 World Championships and won a gold medal in the K1 team, and a bronze medal in the kayak cross. Weeks later she competed at the 2025 U23 European Championships and won a gold medal in the K1 team and a silver medal in the kayak cross individual event.

Beková made her ICF Canoe Slalom World Championships debut at the 2026 ICF Canoe Slalom World Championships and won a silver medal in the kayak cross individual event with a time of 51.08 seconds, finishing three hundredths of a second behind gold medal winner Jessica Fox. She also competed in the K1 event, finished in eighth place in the heats and advanced to the semifinals. On the final day of the competition she competed in the kayak cross event and was eliminated in the quarterfinals.

== World Cup individual podiums ==
Season	Date	Venue	Position	Event
2025	7 September 2025	Augsburg	2nd	Kayak cross
2026	7 June 2026	Prague	1st	Kayak cross individual
