= Lucie Nesnídalová =

Czech slalom canoeist

Personal information
- Nationality: Czech
- Born: 31 July 2002 (age 24) Rokycany, Czech Republic

Sport
- Country: Czech Republic
- Sport: Canoe slalom
- Event: K1, Kayak cross
Medal record
Women's canoe slalom
Representing the Czech Republic
World Championships
Gold medal – first place	2025 Penrith	K1 team
Silver medal – second place	2021 Bratislava	K1 team
European Championships
Gold medal – first place	2025 Vaires-sur-Marne	K1 team
U23 World Championships
Gold medal – first place	2022 Ivrea	K1 team
Gold medal – first place	2025 Foix	K1 team
Silver medal – second place	2023 Kraków	K1 team
Bronze medal – third place	2024 Liptovský Mikuláš	K1 team
U23 European Championships
Gold medal – first place	2023 Bratislava	K1
Gold medal – first place	2025 Solkan	K1 team
Silver medal – second place	2024 Kraków	K1
Bronze medal – third place	2024 Kraków	K1 team
Bronze medal – third place	2025 Solkan	K1
Junior World Championships
Gold medal – first place	2018 Ivrea	K1 team
Silver medal – second place	2019 Kraków	K1 team
Bronze medal – third place	2017 Bratislava	K1
Junior European Championships
Gold medal – first place	2017 Hohenlimburg	K1 team
Gold medal – first place	2018 Bratislava	K1 team
Gold medal – first place	2019 Liptovský Mikuláš	K1 team
Bronze medal – third place	2020 Kraków	K1 team

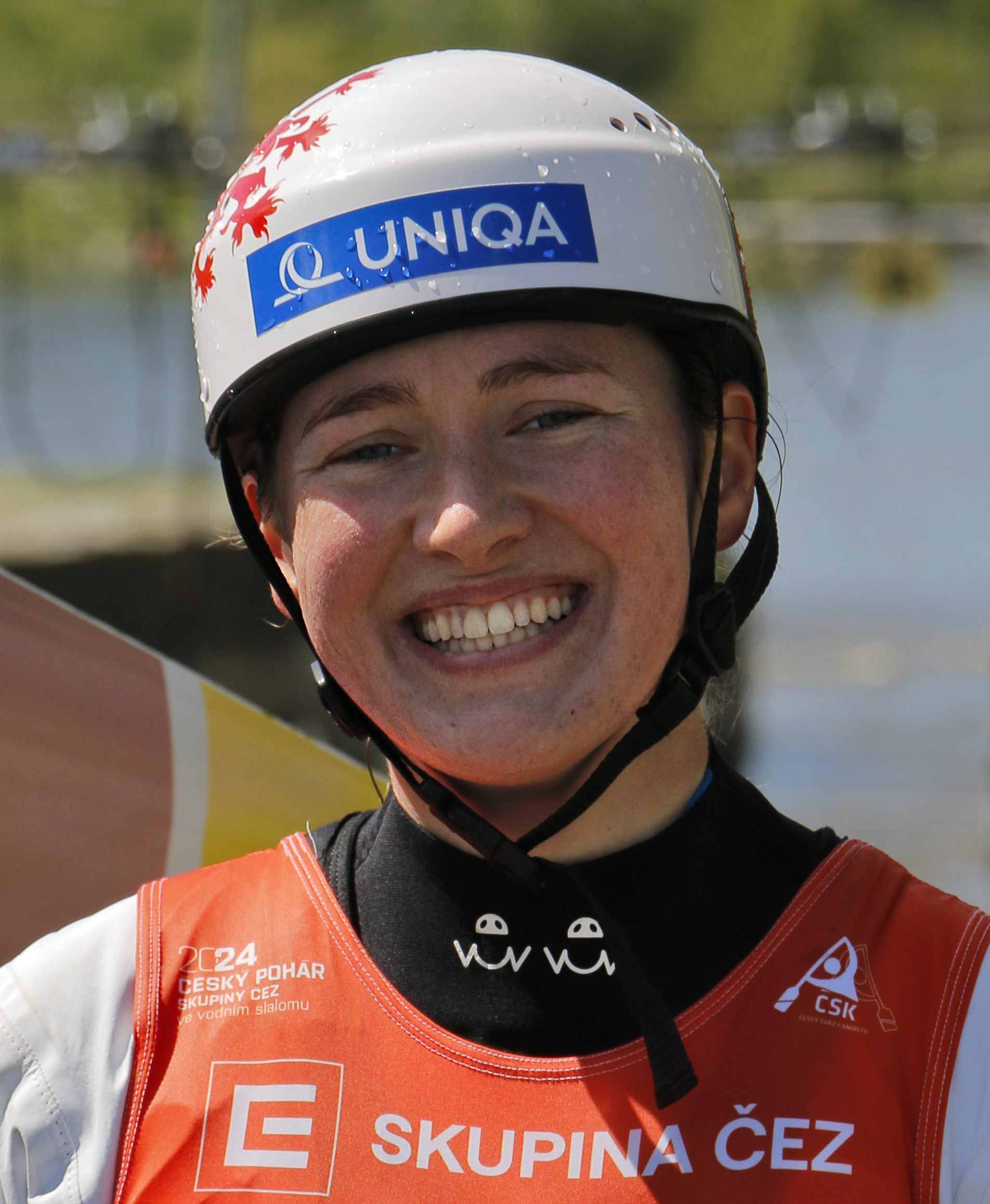
Nesnídalová at the Czech Canoe Slalom Cup in Prague 2024

Lucie Nesnídalová (born 31 July 2002) is a Czech slalom canoeist who has competed at the international level since 2017.

She won won two medals in the K1 team event at the World Championships with a gold in 2025 and a silver in 2021. She also won a gold medal in the K1 team event at the 2025 European Championships in Vaires-sur-Marne.
