= Yohann Senechault =

French slalom canoeist

Personal information
- Nationality: French
- Born: 16 May 2002 (age 24)

Sport
- Country: France
- Sport: Canoe slalom
- Event: C1
Medal record
Men's canoe slalom
Representing France
World Championships
Gold medal – first place	2025 Penrith	C1 team
Silver medal – second place	2026 Oklahoma City	C1 team
European Championships
Gold medal – first place	2026 Ivrea	C1
Gold medal – first place	2026 Ivrea	C1 team
U23 World Championships
Gold medal – first place	2023 Kraków	C1 team
Silver medal – second place	2024 Liptovský Mikuláš	C1
Silver medal – second place	2025 Foix	C1 team
Bronze medal – third place	2024 Liptovský Mikuláš	C1 team
U23 European Championships
Gold medal – first place	2021 Solkan	C1 team
Gold medal – first place	2023 Bratislava	C1
Gold medal – first place	2025 Solkan	C1 team
Silver medal – second place	2023 Bratislava	C1 team
Silver medal – second place	2024 Kraków	C1 team
Bronze medal – third place	2025 Solkan	C1
Junior World Championships
Gold medal – first place	2019 Kraków	C1 team
Junior European Championships
Gold medal – first place	2019 Liptovský Mikuláš	C1
Silver medal – second place	2020 Kraków	C1 team
Bronze medal – third place	2020 Kraków	C1

Yohann Senechault (born 16 May 2002) is a French slalom canoeist who has competed at the international level since 2019, specializing in the C1 event.

He won two medals in the C1 team event at the ICF Canoe Slalom World Championships with a gold in 2025 and a silver in 2026.

He also won two gold medals at the 2026 European Championships in Ivrea.

== World Cup individual podiums ==
Season	Date	Venue	Position	Event
2024	14 September 2024	Ivrea	2nd	C1
2025	14 June 2025	Pau	2nd	C1
2025	28 June 2025	Prague	3rd	C1
2025	30 August 2025	Tacen	2nd	C1
