= Sam Leaver =

British slalom canoeist (born 2004)

Personal information
- Nationality: British
- Born: 9 July 2004 (age 22)

Sport
- Country: Great Britain
- Sport: Canoe slalom
- Event: K1, Kayak cross
Medal record
Men's canoe slalom
Representing the United Kingdom
World Championships
Bronze medal – third place	2026 Oklahoma City	Kayak cross
European Championships
Bronze medal – third place	2025 Vaires-sur-Marne	Kayak cross
Bronze medal – third place	2026 Ivrea	K1 team
U23 World Championships
Gold medal – first place	2023 Kraków	Kayak cross
Gold medal – first place	2025 Foix	Kayak cross individual
Gold medal – first place	2025 Foix	K1 team
Gold medal – first place	2026 Kraków	K1
Silver medal – second place	2024 Liptovský Mikuláš	K1 team
U23 European Championships
Gold medal – first place	2024 Kraków	K1 team
Gold medal – first place	2026 Épinal	Kayak cross individual
Silver medal – second place	2023 Bratislava	Kayak cross
Silver medal – second place	2024 Kraków	Kayak cross
Bronze medal – third place	2023 Bratislava	K1 team
Bronze medal – third place	2025 Solkan	K1 team
Junior World Championships
Bronze medal – third place	2022 Ivrea	K1
Bronze medal – third place	2022 Ivrea	K1 team
Junior European Championships
Silver medal – second place	2021 Solkan	K1 team

Sam Leaver (born 9 July 2004) is a British slalom canoeist who has competed at the international level since 2021, specializing in K1 and kayak cross events.

He won a bronze medal in kayak cross at the 2026 ICF Canoe Slalom World Championships in Oklahoma City. He also won two bronze medals at the European Championships.

Leaver won the overall World Cup title in kayak cross individual in 2025.

His older sister Lois Leaver is also a slalom canoeist.

== World Cup individual podiums ==
Season	Date	Venue	Position	Event
2024	15 September 2024	Ivrea	3rd	Kayak cross
2025	15 June 2025	Pau	2nd	Kayak cross individual
2025	31 August 2025	Tacen	3rd	Kayak cross individual
2025	7 September 2025	Augsburg	2nd	Kayak cross individual
2025	7 September 2025	Augsburg	1st	Kayak cross
2026	31 May 2026	Tacen	1st	Kayak cross individual
