= Emily Apel =

German slalom canoeist

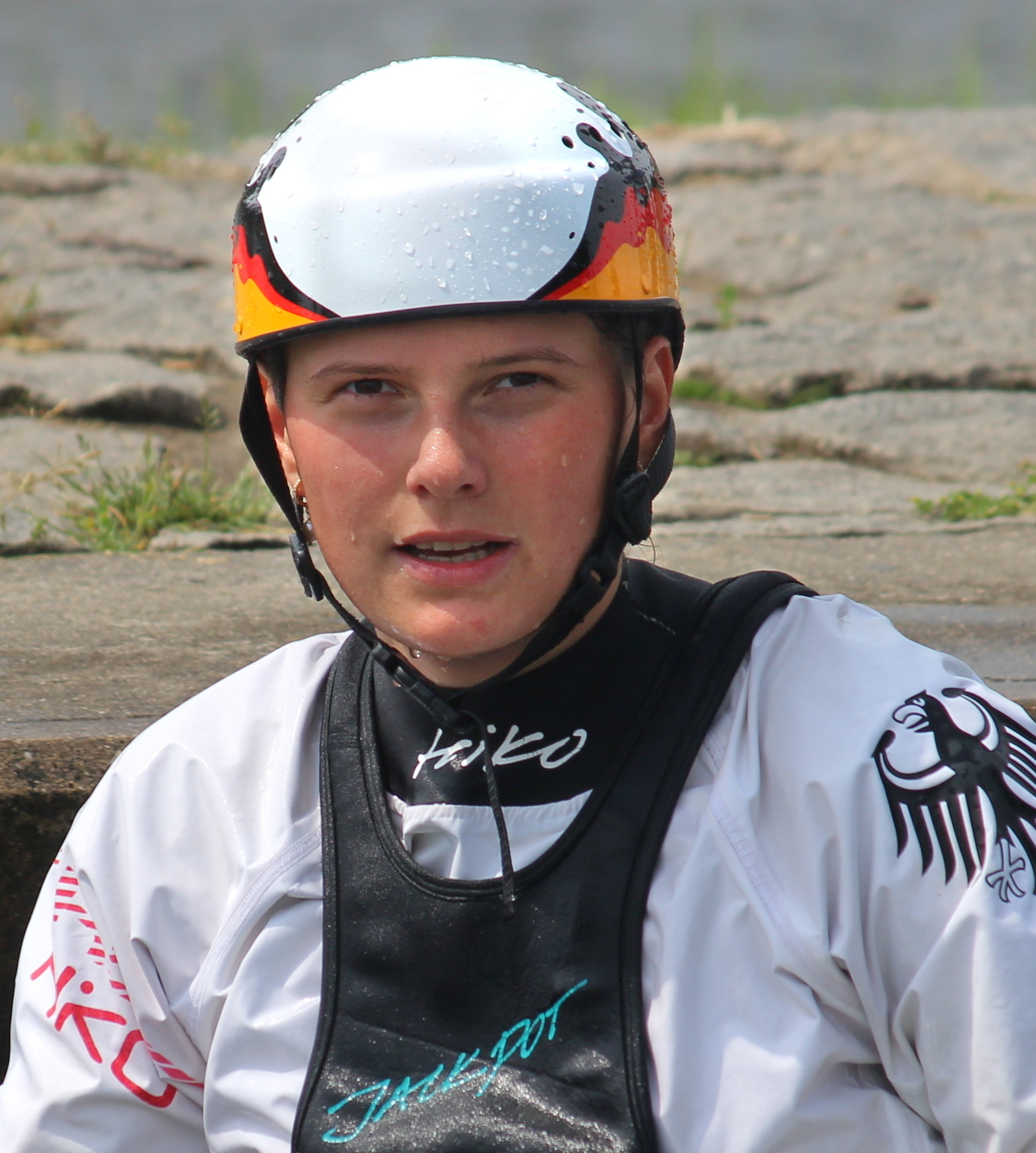
- Apel in 2023

Personal information
- Nationality: German
- Born: 26 September 2002 (age 23) Weimar

Sport
- Country: Germany
- Sport: Canoe slalom
- Event: K1, Kayak cross
Medal record
Women's canoe slalom
Representing Germany
World Championships
Silver medal – second place	2025 Penrith	K1 team
European Games
Bronze medal – third place	2023 Kraków	K1 team
European Championships
Bronze medal – third place	2026 Ivrea	K1
U23 World Championships
Gold medal – first place	2024 Liptovský Mikuláš	K1 team
Silver medal – second place	2022 Ivrea	K1 team
U23 European Championships
Gold medal – first place	2022 České Budějovice	K1 team
Silver medal – second place	2024 Kraków	K1 team
Silver medal – second place	2025 Solkan	K1 team
Bronze medal – third place	2022 České Budějovice	K1
Bronze medal – third place	2023 Bratislava	Kayak cross
Junior European Championships
Gold medal – first place	2020 Kraków	K1 team

Emily Apel (born 26 September 2002) is a German slalom canoeist who has competed at the international level since 2018, specializing in K1 and kayak cross.

She won a silver medal in the K1 team event at the 2025 World Championships in Penrith.

She won two bronze medals at the European Championships, including a bronze in the K1 team event at the 2023 European Games in Kraków.

Her older sister Elena Lilik is also a successful slalom canoeist.
