= Olga Samková =

Czech canoeist (born 2005)

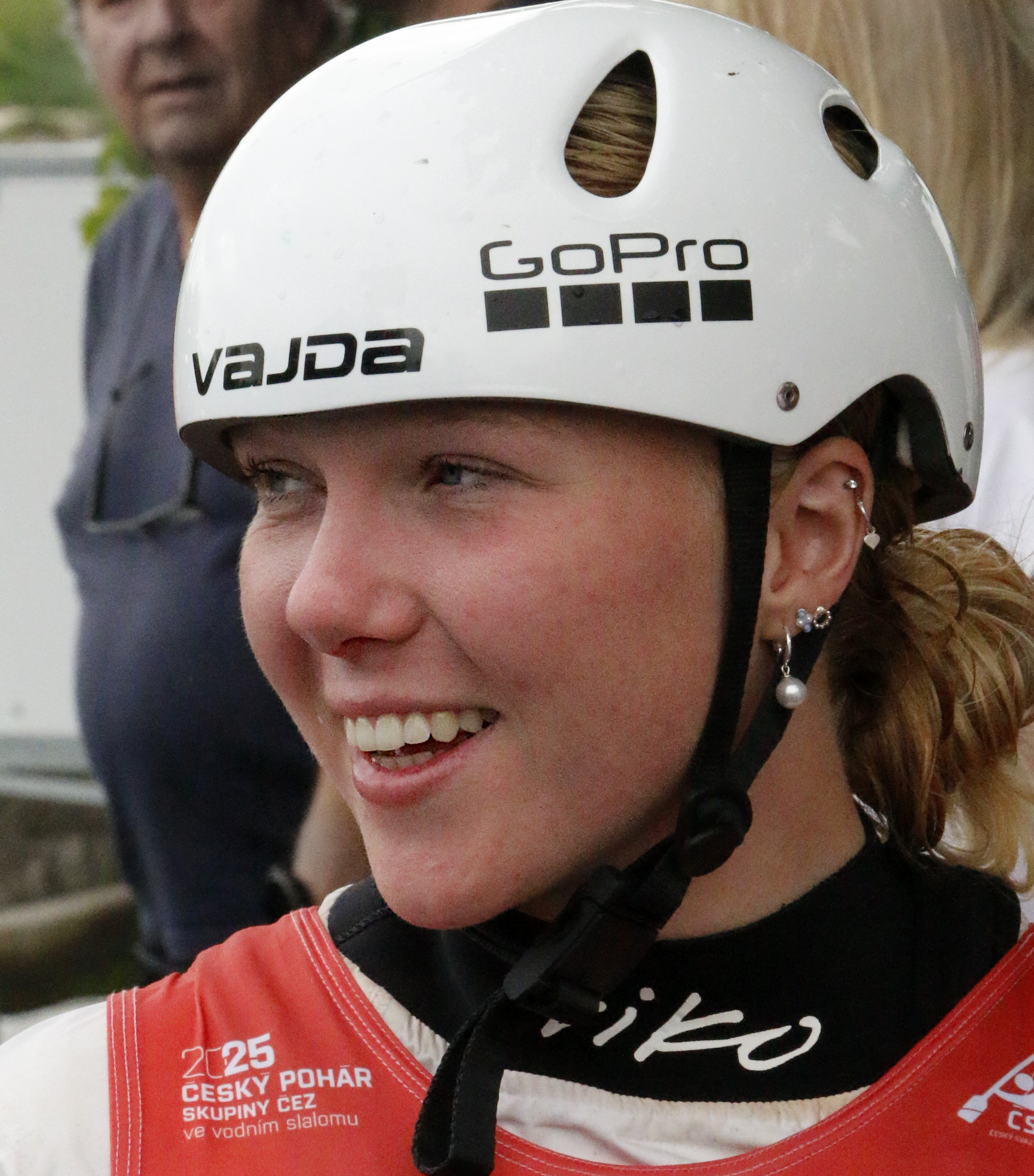
- Samková in 2025

Personal information
- Nationality: Czech
- Born: 10 December 2005 (age 20)

Sport
- Country: Czechia
- Sport: Canoe slalom
- Event: C1, K1, Kayak cross
Medal record
Women's Canoe slalom
Representing Czech Republic
Event	1st	2nd	3rd
European Championships	0	0	1
U23 World Championships	0	2	0
U23 European Championships	1	0	1
Junior World Championships	2	0	0
Junior European Championships	3	3	0
Total	6	5	2
European Championships
Bronze medal – third place	2025 Vaires-sur-Marne	Kayak cross
U23 World Championships
Silver medal – second place	2025 Foix	C1 team
Silver medal – second place	2025 Foix	Kayak cross individual
U23 European Championships
Gold medal – first place	2025 Solkan	C1 team
Bronze medal – third place	2026 Épinal	Kayak cross individual
Junior World Championships
Gold medal – first place	2022 Ivrea	C1 team
Gold medal – first place	2022 Ivrea	K1 team
Junior European Championships
Gold medal – first place	2022 České Budějovice	Kayak cross
Gold medal – first place	2022 České Budějovice	K1 team
Gold medal – first place	2023 Bratislava	K1 team
Silver medal – second place	2022 České Budějovice	K1
Silver medal – second place	2022 České Budějovice	C1 team
Silver medal – second place	2023 Bratislava	K1

Olga Samková (born 10 December 2005) is a Czech slalom canoeist who has competed at the international level since 2022.

== Career ==
Samková made her European Canoe Slalom Championships debut in 2025 and won a bronze medal in the kayak cross event. In July 2025, she competed at the 2025 U23 Canoe Slalom Championships and won a silver medal in the C1 team event. She also won a silver medal in the kayak cross individual event with a time of 55.65 seconds, finishing 0.29 seconds behind gold medalist Zuzana Paňková. She then competed at the 2025 U23 European Canoe Slalom Championships and won a gold medal in the C1 team event.

Samková competed at the 2026 ICF Canoe Slalom World Championships and advanced to the small final of the kayak cross event, finishing in sixth place overall.
