= 2026 European Junior and U23 Canoe Slalom Championships =

Canoe slalom championship in Épinal, France

2026 Paddle Europe Junior & U23 Slalom Championships
- Venue: Base Natur'O
- Location: Épinal, France
- Dates: 5 to 9 August

The 2026 Paddle Europe Junior & U23 Slalom Championships ttok place in Épinal, France from 5 to 9 August under the auspices of Paddle Europe. It was the 28th edition of the competition for the Juniors (U18) and the 24th edition for the Under 23 category.

Épinal hosted the event for the first time. A total of 24 medal events were contested.

== Medal summary ==
=== Junior ===
==== Men ====
===== Canoe =====
Event	Gold		Silver		Bronze	
C1	Léo Royé; France	85.91	Cyrian Menuat; France	88.41	Tomáš Indruch; Czech Republic	88.99
C1 team	Czech Republic; Dominik Řežábek; Jáchym Hanzel; Tomáš Indruch	110.07	Great Britain; Sid Griffiths; Lewis Arden; Alex Cleator	115.14	Germany; Jakob Ungvari; Pascal Brandenburg; Kjell Kadyck	115.62

===== Kayak =====
Event	Gold		Silver		Bronze	
K1	Jakob Ungvari; Germany	80.80	Kilian Käding; Germany	83.46	Théo Chetoui; France	84.50
K1 team	Poland; Marek Kulczycki; Krzysztof Dusik; Wiktor Mazurek	104.29	Czech Republic; Tobiáš Novák; Adam Rezek; Šimon Svoboda	105.93	France; Théo Chetoui; Riwal Le Ray; Liam Le Touze	110.61
Kayak cross individual	Marek Kulczycki; Poland	39.14	Arkhyp Krachko; Ukraine	39.26	Dídac Foz; Spain	39.28
Kayak cross	Max Steinbrenner; Austria		Sid Griffiths; Great Britain		Tim Redling; Switzerland	

==== Women ====
===== Canoe =====
Event	Gold		Silver		Bronze	
C1	Valentýna Kočířová; Czech Republic	97.39	Nova Müller; Germany	104.09	Margot Lapeze; France	105.77
C1 team	France; Margot Lapeze; Laurette Laly; Lili Ulmer	128.38	Czech Republic; Markéta Štěpánková; Valentýna Kočířová; Barbora Ondráčková	129.34	Germany; Neele Krech; Nova Müller; Maxi Müller	145.90

===== Kayak =====
Event	Gold		Silver		Bronze	
K1	Valentýna Kočířová; Czech Republic	93.96	Nova Müller; Germany	96.47	Karolína Abrahámová; Slovakia	98.69
K1 team	Czech Republic; Barbora Ondráčková; Valentýna Kočířová; Lucie Vaculová	121.75	Germany; Nova Müller; Neele Krech; Britta Jung	124.55	France; Margot Lapeze; Laurette Laly; Charlotte Compan	128.34
Kayak cross individual	Lucie Vaculová; Czech Republic	43.88	Valentýna Kočířová; Czech Republic	45.17	Markéta Štěpánková; Czech Republic	45.31
Kayak cross	Valentýna Kočířová; Czech Republic		Lucie Vaculová; Czech Republic		Carla Rhein; Switzerland	

=== Under 23 ===
==== Men ====
===== Canoe =====
Event	Gold		Silver		Bronze	
C1	Titouan Estanguet; France	83.24	Mewen Debliquy; France	83.38	Adam Král; Czech Republic	85.42
C1 team	Germany; Niels Zimmermann; Konrad Ginzel; Anton Weber	102.40	France; Elouan Debliquy; Mewen Debliquy; Titouan Estanguet	103.64	Spain; Alex Segura; Markel Imaz; Marc Vicente	111.16

===== Kayak =====
Event	Gold		Silver		Bronze	
K1	Unai Oteiza; France	78.14	Gabriele Grimandi; Italy	78.79	Faust Clotet Juanmarti; Spain	81.50
K1 team	France; Mewen Debliquy; Titouan Estanguet; Unai Oteiza	99.31	Great Britain; Jonah Hanrahan; Thomas Mayer; Gwion Williams	103.50	Spain; Manel Contreras; Faust Clotet Juanmarti; Miquel Farran	106.49
Kayak cross individual	Sam Leaver; Great Britain	37.23	Martin Rudorfer; Czech Republic	37.99	Gino Benini; France	38.01
Kayak cross	Ianis Triomphe; France		Martin Rudorfer; Czech Republic		Adam Semerád; Czech Republic	

==== Women ====
===== Canoe =====
Event	Gold		Silver		Bronze	
C1	Christin Heydenreich; Germany	100.77	Elena Micozzi; Italy	100.80	Nora López; Spain	100.96
C1 team	Germany; Amelie Plochmann; Paulina Pirro; Christin Heydenreich	128.81	Spain; Nora López; Malen Gutiérrez; Ainara Goikoetxea	133.57	Czech Republic; Julie Štěpánková; Adriana Morenová; Anna Fabianová	135.10

===== Kayak =====
Event	Gold		Silver		Bronze	
K1	Dominika Brzeska; Poland	88.87	Emma Vuitton; France	91.72	Lucia Pistoni; Italy	94.22
K1 team	France; Emma Vuitton; Ilona Martin Laemle; Nina Pesce-Roue	112.98	Germany; Paulina Pirro; Antonia Plochmann; Mina Blume	119.85	Slovenia; Ula Skok; Sara Belingar; Sara Globokar	130.39
Kayak cross individual	Leire Goñi; Spain	42.90	Fia Bütikofer; Switzerland	43.03	Olga Samková; Czech Republic	43.15
Kayak cross	Paulina Pirro; Germany		Katherine Shattock; Great Britain		Léna Quémérais; France	

== Medal table ==
* Host nation (France)

Rank	Nation	Gold	Silver	Bronze	Total
1	France (FRA)*	7	4	6	17
2	Czech Republic (CZE)	6	6	6	18
3	Germany (GER)	5	5	2	12
4	Poland (POL)	3	0	0	3
5	Great Britain (GBR)	1	4	0	5
6	Spain (ESP)	1	1	5	7
7	Austria (AUT)	1	0	0	1
8	Italy (ITA)	0	2	1	3
9	Switzerland (SUI)	0	1	2	3
10	Ukraine (UKR)	0	1	0	1
11	Slovakia (SVK)	0	0	1	1
11	Slovenia (SLO)	0	0	1	1
Totals (12 entries)		24	24	24	72
