= 2020 European Junior and U23 Canoe Slalom Championships =

- Location: Kraków, Poland

The 2020 European Junior and U23 Canoe Slalom Championships took place at the Kraków-Kolna Canoe Slalom Course in Kraków, Poland from 1 to 4 October 2020 under the auspices of the European Canoe Association (ECA). The event was moved from its original date (13 to 16 August 2020) due to the COVID-19 pandemic. It was the 22nd edition of the competition for Juniors (U18) and the 18th edition for the Under 23 category. Several leading countries (including Great Britain, Slovakia and Spain) opted out of the event completely.

== Medal summary ==
=== Men ===
==== Canoe ====
===== Junior =====
Event	Gold		Silver		Bronze	
C1	Mewen Debliquy; France	96.82	Adam Král; Czech Republic	100.95	Yohann Senechault; France	102.71
C1 team	Czech Republic; Martin Kratochvíl; Adam Král; Kryštof Lhota	113.03	France; Yohann Senechault; Loïc Trenchant; Mewen Debliquy	116.22	Poland; Szymon Nowobilski; Filip Leśniak; Maciej Bartos	126.03

===== U23 =====
Event	Gold		Silver		Bronze	
C1	Vojtěch Heger; Czech Republic	96.59	Kacper Sztuba; Poland	97.74	Dmitrii Khramtsov; Russia	98.18
C1 team	Russia; Dmitrii Khramtsov; Mikhail Kruglov; Pavel Kotov	108.10	Czech Republic; Vojtěch Heger; Václav Chaloupka; Jan Větrovský	108.37	Germany; Lennard Tuchscherer; Florian Breuer; Julian Lindolf	112.13

==== Kayak ====
===== Junior =====
Event	Gold		Silver		Bronze	
K1	Egor Smirnov; Russia	96.98	Martin Rudorfer; Czech Republic	97.80	Jakub Krejčí; Czech Republic	98.57
K1 team	Poland; Tadeusz Kuchno; Michał Ciągło; Mikołaj Mastalski	106.50	France; Noe Perreau; Tom Babin; Jean-Charles Hacquart	108.79	Russia; Egor Smirnov; Ivan Kozlov; Bogdan Likhachev	109.56

===== U23 =====
Event	Gold		Silver		Bronze	
K1	Mario Leitner; Austria	90.94	Krzysztof Majerczak; Poland	91.62	Gabriel De Coster; Belgium	91.69
K1 team	Germany; Noah Hegge; Lukas Stahl; Thomas Strauss	101.53	Czech Republic; Tomáš Zima; Jan Bárta; Alexandr Maikranz	101.73	Poland; Krzysztof Majerczak; Jakub Brzeziński; Wiktor Sandera	103.30

=== Women ===
==== Canoe ====
===== Junior =====
Event	Gold		Silver		Bronze	
C1	Tereza Kneblová; Czech Republic	112.75	Doriane Delassus; France	118.94	Camille Castryck; France	119.13
C1 team	Czech Republic; Klára Kneblová; Tereza Kneblová; Veronika Janů	131.80	France; Doriane Delassus; Camille Castryck; Laurine Salesse	132.03	Germany; Zola Lewandowski; Jannemien Panzlaff; Lucie Krech	140.16

===== U23 =====
Event	Gold		Silver		Bronze	
C1	Elena Apel; Germany	106.70	Gabriela Satková; Czech Republic	106.76	Andrea Herzog; Germany	109.75
C1 team	Czech Republic; Tereza Fišerová; Gabriela Satková; Martina Satková	124.40	Germany; Andrea Herzog; Elena Apel; Zoe Jakob	126.16	Russia; Alsu Minazova; Daria Shaidurova; Anastasia Kozyreva	136.19

==== Kayak ====
===== Junior =====
Event	Gold		Silver		Bronze	
K1	Paulina Pirro; Germany	105.94	Emma Vuitton; France	106.85	Kateřina Beková; Czech Republic	109.12
K1 team	Germany; Antonia Plochmann; Paulina Pirro; Emily Apel	117.65	Slovenia; Eva Alina Hočevar; Helena Domajnko; Zala Zanoškar	121.38	Czech Republic; Kateřina Beková; Lucie Nesnídalová; Barbora Karlíková	121.65

===== U23 =====
Event	Gold		Silver		Bronze	
K1	Elena Apel; Germany	99.01	Klaudia Zwolińska; Poland	101.18	Antonie Galušková; Czech Republic	104.54
K1 team	Russia; Kseniia Krylova; Alsu Minazova; Daria Kuznetsova	121.52	Germany; Elena Apel; Selina Jones; Franziska Hanke	123.67	Czech Republic; Antonie Galušková; Amálie Hilgertová; Kateřina Dušková	123.89

== Medal table ==
Rank	Nation	Gold	Silver	Bronze	Total
1	Czech Republic (CZE)	5	5	5	15
2	Germany (GER)	5	2	3	10
3	Russia (RUS)	3	0	3	6
4	France (FRA)	1	5	2	8
5	Poland (POL)	1	3	2	6
6	Austria (AUT)	1	0	0	1
7	Slovenia (SLO)	0	1	0	1
8	Belgium (BEL)	0	0	1	1
Totals (8 entries)		16	16	16	48
