= Adriana Morenová =

Czech slalom canoeist

Personal information
- Nationality: Czech
- Born: 3 May 2004 (age 22)

Sport
- Country: Czech Republic
- Sport: Canoe slalom
- Event: C1
Medal record
Women's canoe slalom
Representing the Czech Republic
World Championships
Gold medal – first place	2025 Penrith	C1 team
Silver medal – second place	2026 Oklahoma City	C1 team
European Championships
Gold medal – first place	2025 Vaires-sur-Marne	C1 team
U23 World Championships
Gold medal – first place	2026 Kraków	C1 team
Silver medal – second place	2025 Foix	C1 team
U23 European Championships
Gold medal – first place	2025 Solkan	C1 team
Silver medal – second place	2024 Kraków	C1 team
Bronze medal – third place	2026 Épinal	C1 team
Junior World Championships
Gold medal – first place	2022 Ivrea	C1 team
Junior European Championships
Silver medal – second place	2022 České Budějovice	C1
Silver medal – second place	2022 České Budějovice	C1 team

Adriana Morenová (born 3 May 2004) is a Czech slalom canoeist who has competed at the international level since 2022, specializing in the C1 event.

She won two medals in the C1 team event at the ICF Canoe Slalom World Championships with a gold in 2025 and a silver in 2026. She also won a gold medal in the same event at the 2025 European Championships in Vaires-sur-Marne.
