= 2025 European Junior and U23 Canoe Slalom Championships =

- Location: Solkan, Slovenia
- Dates: 30 July to 3 August

The 2025 European Junior and U23 Canoe Slalom Championships took place in Solkan, Slovenia from 30 July to 3 August under the auspices of the European Canoe Association (ECA). It was the 27th edition of the competition for the Juniors (U18) and the 23rd edition for the Under 23 category.

Solkan hosted the junior championships for the 6th time and the U23 championships for the 5th time (Junior: 1999, Junior and U23: 2008, 2012, 2016, 2021).

== Medal summary ==
=== Junior ===
==== Men ====
===== Canoe =====
Event	Gold		Silver		Bronze	
C1	Dominik Egyházy; Slovakia	94.70	Oier Díaz; Spain	96.11	Žiga Lin Hočevar; Slovenia	97.05
C1 team	France; Léo Ulmer; Titouan Estanguet; Mathéo Senechault	97.26	Italy; Riccardo Pontarollo; Lars Aaron Senoner; Dennis Fina	99.56	Germany; Jakob Ungvari; Anton Weber; Pascal Brandenburg	99.67

===== Kayak =====
Event	Gold		Silver		Bronze	
K1	Faust Clotet Juanmarti; Spain	89.26	Daniele Romano; Italy	89.46	Michal Kopeček; Czech Republic	89.79
K1 team	Germany; Kilian Käding; Nelian Laryea; Joseph Seibert	92.49	France; Titouan Estanguet; Tao Petit; Clément Davy	94.29	Czech Republic; Michal Kopeček; Martin Panzer; Jáchym Fröhlich	95.75
Kayak cross individual	Žiga Lin Hočevar; Slovenia	41.92	Dávid Skubík; Slovakia	43.59	Clément Davy; France	44.19
Kayak cross	Michal Kopeček; Czech Republic		Gwion Williams; Great Britain		Martin Panzer; Czech Republic	

==== Women ====
===== Canoe =====
Event	Gold		Silver		Bronze	
C1	Eyleen Vuilleumier; Switzerland	115.01	Ainara Goikoetxea; Spain	115.35	Margot Lapeze; France	116.82
C1 team	Czech Republic; Markéta Štěpánková; Valentýna Kočířová; Barbora Ondráčková	114.06	Spain; Anna Simona; Ainara Goikoetxea; Ainhoa Segura	116.72	Poland; Hanna Danek; Julia Kirkowska; Patrycja Iwaniec	121.44

===== Kayak =====
Event	Gold		Silver		Bronze	
K1	Karolína Abrahámová; Slovakia	104.90	Arina Kontchakov; Great Britain	105.35	Markéta Hojdová; Czech Republic	106.58
K1 team	Czech Republic; Markéta Hojdová; Anna Fabianová; Barbora Ondráčková	107.33	Spain; Anna Simona; Ainara Goikoetxea; Ainhoa Segura	111.03	Germany; Mina Blume; Nova Müller; Britta Jung	111.85
Kayak cross individual	Anna Simona; Spain	47.69	Mina Blume; Germany	48.88	Olwen Yates; Great Britain	48.90
Kayak cross	Britta Jung; Germany		Laurette Laly; France		Ainara Goikoetxea; Spain	

=== Under 23 ===
==== Men ====
===== Canoe =====
Event	Gold		Silver		Bronze	
C1	Elouan Debliquy; France	92.69	Martin Cornu; France	93.83	Yohann Senechault; France	93.84
C1 team	France; Elouan Debliquy; Martin Cornu; Yohann Senechault	92.29	Poland; Szymon Nowobilski; Krzysztof Książek; Szymon Sowiźrał	96.45	Italy; Elio Maiutto; Martino Barzon; Marino Spagnol	96.57

===== Kayak =====
Event	Gold		Silver		Bronze	
K1	Martin Cornu; France	87.46	Gabriele Grimandi; Italy	89.99	Enrico Dietz; Germany	90.93
K1 team	Germany; Enrico Dietz; Christian Stanzel; Marten Konrad	88.14	France; Martin Cornu; Noe Perreau; Elouan Debliquy	88.74	Great Britain; Jonah Hanrahan; Sam Leaver; Thomas Mayer	90.77
Kayak cross individual	Jan Ločnikar; Slovenia	42.56	Martin Cornu; France	42.94	Tadeusz Kuchno; Poland	43.17
Kayak cross	Felix Sachers; Germany		Martin Cornu; France		Ianis Triomphe; France	

==== Women ====
===== Canoe =====
Event	Gold		Silver		Bronze	
C1	Eva Alina Hočevar; Slovenia	101.59	Elena Borghi; Italy	104.21	Doriane Delassus; France	104.25
C1 team	Czech Republic; Adriana Morenová; Tereza Kneblová; Olga Samková	105.41	Germany; Kimberley Rappe; Amelie Plochmann; Lucie Krech	107.79	France; Doriane Delassus; Zoe Laurent; Nina Pesce-Roue	107.83

===== Kayak =====
Event	Gold		Silver		Bronze	
K1	Eva Alina Hočevar; Slovenia	97.44	Lucia Pistoni; Italy	99.29	Lucie Nesnídalová; Czech Republic	99.54
K1 team	Czech Republic; Kateřina Beková; Lucie Nesnídalová; Klára Mrázková	99.44	Germany; Paulina Pirro; Antonia Plochmann; Emily Apel	101.48	Italy; Lucia Pistoni; Caterina Pignat; Milena Marini	102.38
Kayak cross individual	Tereza Kneblová; Czech Republic	46.03	Kateřina Beková; Czech Republic	46.59	Eva Alina Hočevar; Slovenia	46.82
Kayak cross	Nina Pesce-Roue; France		Eva Alina Hočevar; Slovenia		Tereza Kneblová; Czech Republic	

== Medal table ==
* Host nation (Slovenia)

Rank	Nation	Gold	Silver	Bronze	Total
1	Czech Republic (CZE)	6	1	6	13
2	France (FRA)	5	6	6	17
3	Germany (GER)	4	3	3	10
4	Slovenia (SLO)*	4	1	2	7
5	Spain (ESP)	2	4	1	7
6	Slovakia (SVK)	2	1	0	3
7	Switzerland (SUI)	1	0	0	1
8	Italy (ITA)	0	5	2	7
9	Great Britain (GBR)	0	2	2	4
10	Poland (POL)	0	1	2	3
Totals (10 entries)		24	24	24	72
