= Florian Breuer =

German former canoe athlete who competed internationally

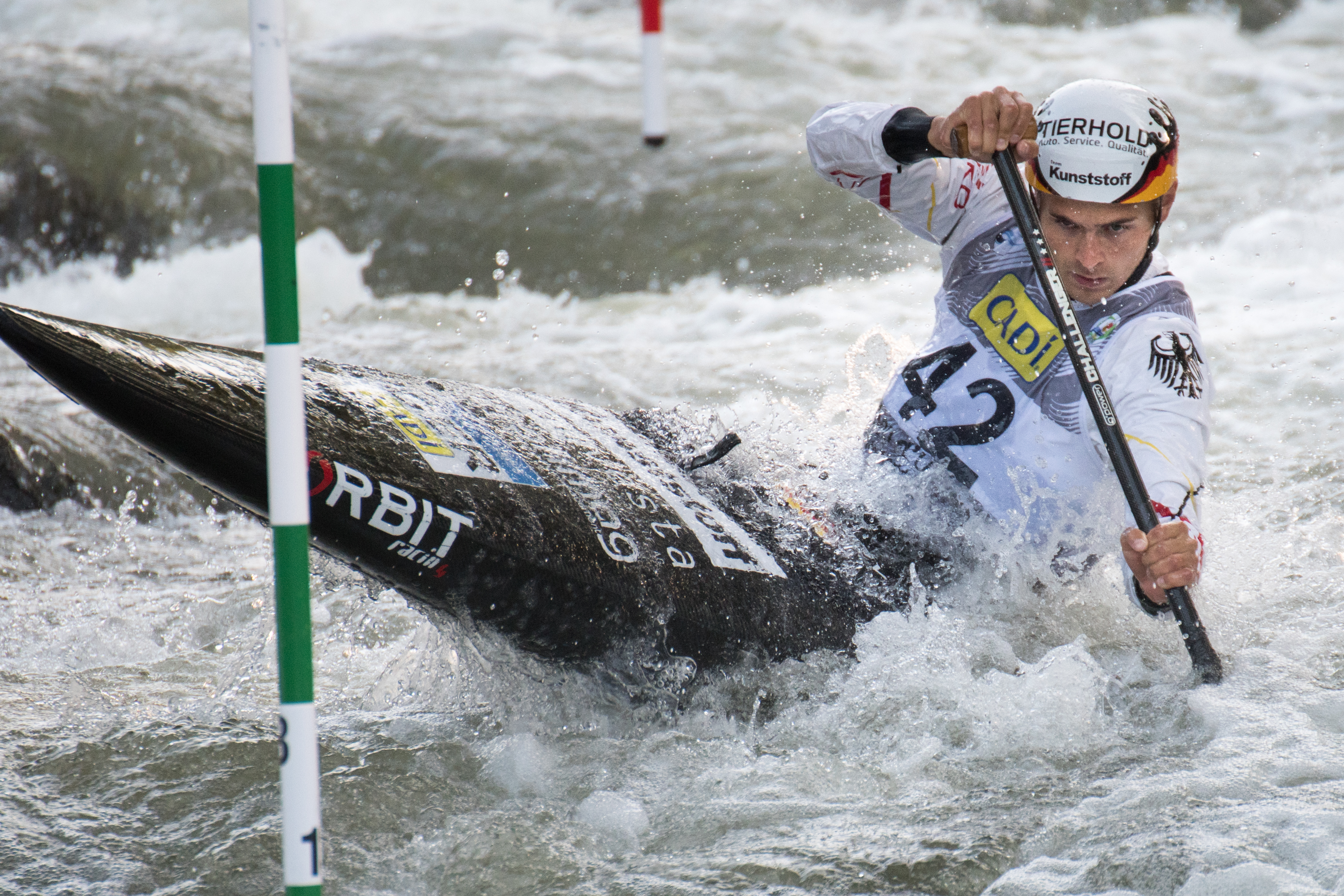

Personal information
- Full name: Florian Breuer
- Nationality: German
- Born: 30 January 1997 (age 29) Düren, Germany
- Years active: 2012–2020
- Height: 183 cm (6 ft 0 in)
- Weight: 74 kg (163 lb; 11 st 9 lb)
- Website: https://flobreuer.com/

Sport
- Sport: Canoe slalom
Medal record
| Event | 1st | 2nd | 3rd |
|---|---|---|---|
| U23 World Championships | 1 | 0 | 2 |
| U23 European Championships | 0 | 1 | 2 |
| Junior World Championships | 2 | 1 | 0 |
| Junior European Championships | 2 | 1 | 3 |
| Total | 5 | 3 | 7 |
U23 World Championships
| Gold medal – first place | 2016 Kraków | C1 |
| Bronze medal – third place | 2017 Bratislava | C1 |
| Bronze medal – third place | 2016 Kraków | C1 team |
U23 European Championships
| Silver medal – second place | 2017 Hohenlimburg | C1 team |
| Bronze medal – third place | 2016 Solkan | C1 team |
| Bronze medal – third place | 2020 Kraków | C1 team |
Junior World Championships
| Gold medal – first place | 2014 Penrith | C1 |
| Gold medal – first place | 2015 Foz do Iguaçu | C1 team |
| Silver medal – second place | 2013 Liptovský Mikuláš | C1 team |
Junior European Championships
| Gold medal – first place | 2012 Solkan | C1 team |
| Gold medal – first place | 2014 Skopje | C1 team |
| Silver medal – second place | 2014 Skopje | C1 |
| Bronze medal – third place | 2013 Bourg-Saint-Maurice | C1 |
| Bronze medal – third place | 2015 Kraków | C1 |
| Bronze medal – third place | 2015 Kraków | C1 team |

Florian Breuer (born 30 January 1997) is a former slalom canoeist who competed for Germany from 2012 to 2020, specializing in the C1 discipline. He won a total of 15 medals at World and European championships at the junior and under-23 level.

== Early life ==
Florian Breuer was born on 30 January 30 1997 in Düren, Germany. At two years old, he moved with his family to Nuremberg, where he grew up and developed an early interest in sports, especially canoe slalom.

== Career ==
=== Beginnings ===
After winning several German championship titles for students, Breuer moved to Augsburg in 2009 to take advantage of the first-class training opportunities at the "Federal Performance Center for Canoe Slalom and Whitewater", home to the Augsburg Eiskanal. As a member of the Augsburg Kayak Club, he was named “Athlete of the Year” by the Bavarian Canoe Association in 2011. At just 15 years old, he qualified for the German U18 national team and competed with the team in the World and the European Championships since 2012.

=== Achievements and recognitions ===
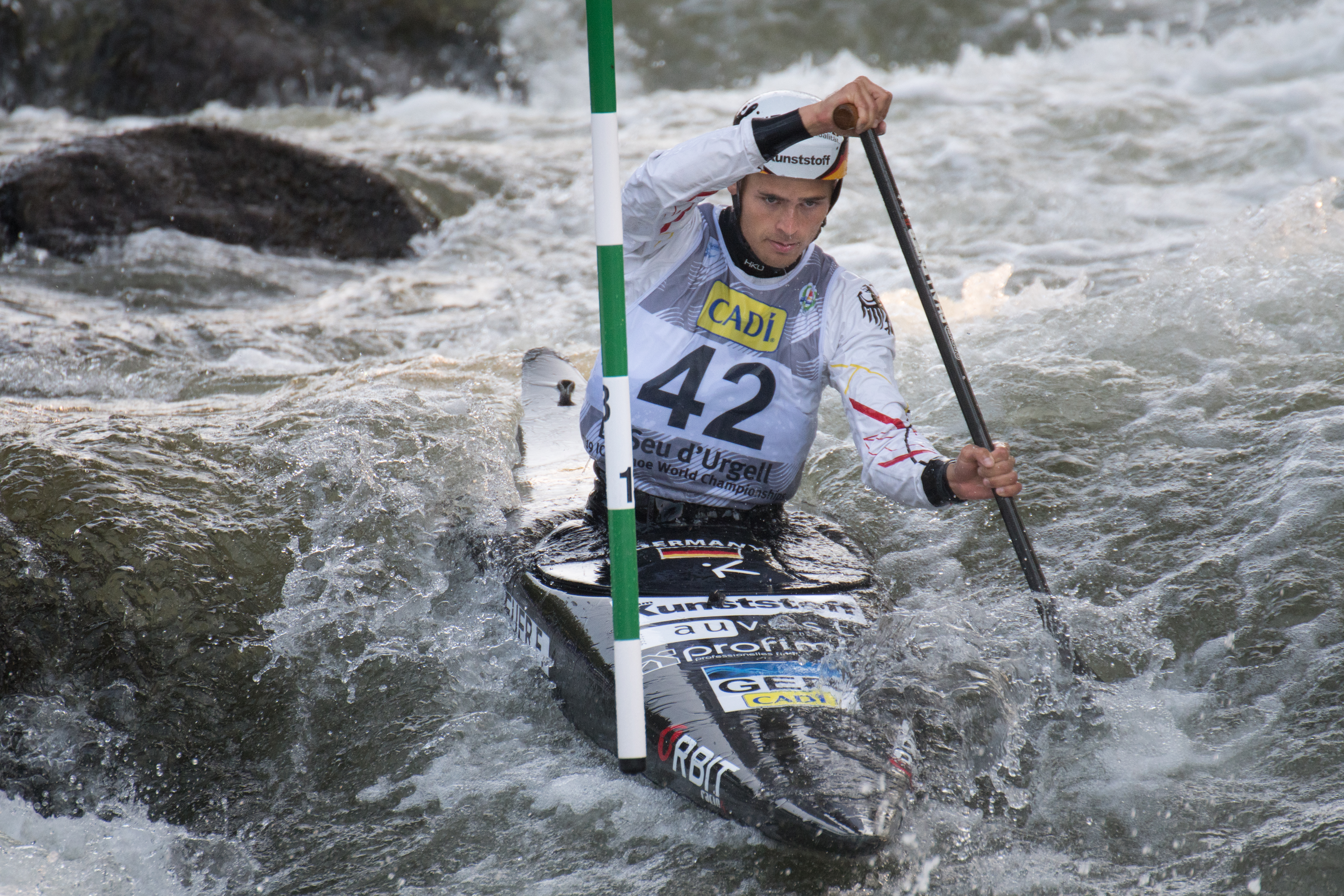
Breuer at the 2019 ICF Canoe Slalom World Championships

Trained by Sören Kaufmann, Breuer won his first international individual medal at the 2013 European Junior Championships in Bourg Saint Maurice, France. The following year, Breuer won his first world title at the 2014 World Junior Championships in Penrith, Australia.

These achievements earned him nominations for "Junior Athlete of the Year" from Deutsche Sporthilfe. and “Sports Junior” from the World Paddle Awards He was also the youngest participant at the 2014 ICF Canoe Slalom World Championships in Deep Creek Lake, USA. In 2016, Breuer set another milestone by winning the U23 World Championships title in Kraków, Poland.

=== Health challenges ===
In 2018, Breuer faced health problems that seriously jeopardized his career. Despite efforts, he was unable to return fully to his previous performance. Postponement of the 2020 Olympic Games due to the COVID-19 pandemic and a complicated rupture of a ligament in his left ring finger ultimately led to him ending his active career in 2021.

== Current activities ==
After ending his active sporting career, Florian Breuer moved to Berlin. He is working as the Creative Director and Managing Director of DAS WORKOUT n'CM GmbH.
