= List of European Under 23 Canoe Slalom Championships medalists =

This is a list of medalists from the European Junior and U23 Canoe Slalom Championships in the under 23 category.

== Individual ==
=== Canoe Single (C1) Men ===
Championships	Gold	Silver	Bronze
2002 Bratislava	Jon Ergüín (ESP)	Alexander Slafkovský (SVK)	Christian Bahmann (GER)
2004 Kraków	Jan Benzien (GER)	Lukas Hoffmann (GER)	Krzysztof Supowicz (POL)
2005 Kraków	Grzegorz Wójs (POL)	Hervé Chevrier (FRA)	Alexander Slafkovský (SVK)
2006 Nottingham	Alexander Slafkovský (SVK)	Nicolas Peschier (FRA)	Christos Tsakmakis (GRE)
2007 Kraków	Christos Tsakmakis (GRE)	Petr Karásek (CZE)	Matej Beňuš (SVK)
2008 Solkan	Christos Tsakmakis (GRE)	Matej Beňuš (SVK)	Benjamin Savšek (SLO)
2009 Liptovský Mikuláš	Matej Beňuš (SVK)	Karol Rozmuš (SVK)	Ander Elosegi (ESP)
2010 Markkleeberg	Denis Gargaud Chanut (FRA)	Matej Beňuš (SVK)	Christos Tsakmakis (GRE)
2011 Banja Luka	Anže Berčič (SLO)	Matija Marinić (CRO)	Alexander Funk (GER)
2012 Solkan	Thibaud Vielliard (FRA)	Ruslan Sayfiev (RUS)	Roberto Colazingari (ITA)
2013 Bourg-Saint-Maurice	Matija Marinić (CRO)	Anže Berčič (SLO)	Thomas Quinn (GBR)
2014 Skopje	Maxime Perron (FRA)	Kilian Foulon (FRA)	Simon Le Friec (FRA)
2015 Kraków	Kirill Setkin (RUS)	Thibault Blaise (FRA)	Kilian Foulon (FRA)
2016 Solkan	Ryan Westley (GBR)	Lukáš Rohan (CZE)	Kirill Setkin (RUS)
2017 Hohenlimburg	Marko Mirgorodský (SVK)	Cédric Joly (FRA)	Lukáš Rohan (CZE)
2018 Bratislava	Cédric Joly (FRA)	Valentin Marteil (FRA)	Przemysław Nowak (POL)
2019 Liptovský Mikuláš	Nicolas Gestin (FRA)	Marko Mirgorodský (SVK)	Lucas Roisin (FRA)
2020 Kraków	Vojtěch Heger (CZE)	Kacper Sztuba (POL)	Dmitrii Khramtsov (RUS)
2021 Solkan	Václav Chaloupka (CZE)	Vojtěch Heger (CZE)	Jules Bernardet (FRA)
2022 České Budějovice	Vojtěch Heger (CZE)	Mewen Debliquy (FRA)	Lennard Tuchscherer (GER)
2023 Bratislava	Yohann Senechault (FRA)	Vojtěch Heger (CZE)	Peter Linksted (GBR)
2024 Kraków	Mewen Debliquy (FRA)	Adam Král (CZE)	Kurts Rozentals (GBR)
2025 Solkan	Elouan Debliquy (FRA)	Martin Cornu (FRA)	Yohann Senechault (FRA)
2026 Épinal	Titouan Estanguet (FRA)	Mewen Debliquy (FRA)	Adam Král (CZE)

=== Canoe Double (C2) Men ===
Championships	Gold	Silver	Bronze
2002 Bratislava	Ladislav Škantár/Peter Škantár (SVK)	Remy Gaspard/Julien Gaspard (FRA)	Martin Braud/Cédric Forgit (FRA)
2004 Kraków	Ladislav Škantár/Peter Škantár (SVK)	Martin Braud/Cédric Forgit (FRA)	Felix Michel/Sebastian Piersig (GER)
2005 Kraków	Ladislav Škantár/Peter Škantár (SVK)	Mathieu Voyemant/Damien Troquenet (FRA)	Jarosław Miczek/Wojciech Sekuła (POL)
2006 Nottingham	Tomáš Kučera/Ján Bátik (SVK)	Mathieu Voyemant/Damien Troquenet (FRA)	Ladislav Vlček/Martin Hammer (CZE)
2007 Kraków	Gauthier Klauss/Matthieu Péché (FRA)	Marcin Pochwała/Paweł Sarna (POL)	Martin Hammer/Ladislav Vlček (CZE)
2008 Solkan	Gauthier Klauss/Matthieu Péché (FRA)	Luka Božič/Sašo Taljat (SLO)	Tomáš Kučera/Ján Bátik (SVK)
2009 Liptovský Mikuláš	Kai Müller/Kevin Müller (GER)	Sašo Taljat/Luka Božič (SLO)	Robert Gotvald/Jan Vlček (CZE)
2010 Markkleeberg	Pierre Picco/Hugo Biso (FRA)	Gauthier Klauss/Matthieu Péché (FRA)	Ondřej Karlovský/Jakub Jáně (CZE)
2011 Banja Luka	Sašo Taljat/Luka Božič (SLO)	Ondřej Karlovský/Jakub Jáně (CZE)	Robert Behling/Thomas Becker (GER)
2012 Solkan	Sašo Taljat/Luka Božič (SLO)	Rhys Davies/Matthew Lister (GBR)	Dariusz Chlebek/Dominik Węglarz (POL)
2013 Bourg-Saint-Maurice	Jonáš Kašpar/Marek Šindler (CZE)	Daniel Marzo/Jesús Pérez (ESP)	Filip Brzeziński/Andrzej Brzeziński (POL)
2014 Skopje	Hugo Cailhol/Nicolas Scianimanico (FRA)	Ryan Westley/Zachary Franklin (GBR)	Filip Brzeziński/Andrzej Brzeziński (POL)
2015 Kraków	Michał Wiercioch/Grzegorz Majerczak (POL)	Filip Brzeziński/Andrzej Brzeziński (POL)	Aleksei Popov/Vadim Voinalovich (RUS)
2016 Solkan	Matúš Gewissler/Juraj Skákala (SVK)	Michał Wiercioch/Grzegorz Majerczak (POL)	Nikolay Shkliaruk/Igor Mikhailov (RUS)
2017 Hohenlimburg	Vojtěch Mrůzek/Albert Kašpar (CZE)	Juraj Skákala/Matúš Gewissler (SVK)	Pavel Kotov/Sergei Komkov (RUS)
2018 Bratislava (exhibition event)	Nikolay Shkliaruk/Igor Mikhailov (RUS)	Albert Kašpar/Vojtěch Mrůzek (CZE)	Pavel Kotov/Sergei Komkov (RUS)

=== Kayak (K1) Men ===
Championships	Gold	Silver	Bronze
2002 Bratislava	Fabien Lefèvre (FRA)	Friedemann Barthel (GER)	Jan Kobes (CZE)
2004 Kraków	Ján Šajbidor (SVK)	Andrej Nolimal (SLO)	Stefano Cipressi (ITA)
2005 Kraków	Daniele Molmenti (ITA)	Grzegorz Polaczyk (POL)	Domenik Bartsch (GER)
2006 Nottingham	Peter Kauzer (SLO)	Dariusz Popiela (POL)	Daniele Molmenti (ITA)
2007 Kraków	Dariusz Popiela (POL)	Sebastian Schubert (GER)	Andrea Romeo (ITA)
2008 Solkan	Andrea Romeo (ITA)	Grzegorz Polaczyk (POL)	Samuel Hernanz (ESP)
2009 Liptovský Mikuláš	Vavřinec Hradilek (CZE)	Boris Neveu (FRA)	Samuel Hernanz (ESP)
2010 Markkleeberg	Sebastian Schubert (GER)	Hannes Aigner (GER)	Vivien Colober (FRA)
2011 Banja Luka	Mateusz Polaczyk (POL)	Benjamin Renia (FRA)	Nils Winkler (GER)
2012 Solkan	Martin Halčin (SVK)	Simon Brus (SLO)	Rafał Polaczyk (POL)
2013 Bourg-Saint-Maurice	Martin Halčin (SVK)	Joe Clarke (GBR)	Giovanni De Gennaro (ITA)
2014 Skopje	Rafał Polaczyk (POL)	Quentin Burgi (FRA)	Jiří Prskavec (CZE)
2015 Kraków	Jiří Prskavec (CZE)	Zeno Ivaldi (ITA)	David Llorente (ESP)
2016 Solkan	Andrej Málek (SVK)	Clément Travert (FRA)	Stefan Hengst (GER)
2017 Hohenlimburg	Mario Leitner (AUT)	Jakob Weger (ITA)	Žan Jakše (SLO)
2018 Bratislava	David Llorente (ESP)	Jakub Grigar (SVK)	Lukas Stahl (GER)
2019 Liptovský Mikuláš	Jakub Grigar (SVK)	Tomáš Zima (CZE)	Sergey Maimistov (RUS)
2020 Kraków	Mario Leitner (AUT)	Krzysztof Majerczak (POL)	Gabriel De Coster (BEL)
2021 Solkan	Jakub Krejčí (CZE)	Anatole Delassus (FRA)	Christopher Bowers (GBR)
2022 České Budějovice	Jakub Krejčí (CZE)	Miquel Travé (ESP)	Joshua Dietz (GER)
2023 Bratislava	Miquel Travé (ESP)	Jakub Krejčí (CZE)	Leo Vuitton (FRA)
2024 Kraków	Ben Haylett (GBR)	Leo Vuitton (FRA)	Edgar Paleau-Brasseur (FRA)
2025 Solkan	Martin Cornu (FRA)	Gabriele Grimandi (ITA)	Enrico Dietz (GER)
2026 Épinal	Unai Oteiza (FRA)	Gabriele Grimandi (ITA)	Faust Clotet Juanmarti (ESP)

=== Kayak cross Men ===
Championships	Gold	Silver	Bronze
2021 Solkan	Jakub Krejčí (CZE)	Dimitri Marx (SUI)	Manuel Ochoa (ESP)
2022 České Budějovice	Pau Echaniz (ESP)	Anatole Delassus (FRA)	Gaël Adisson (FRA)
2023 Bratislava	Anatole Delassus (FRA)	Sam Leaver (GBR)	Vincent Delahaye (FRA)
2024 Kraków	Miquel Farran (ESP)	Sam Leaver (GBR)	Anatole Delassus (FRA)
2025 Solkan	Felix Sachers (GER)	Martin Cornu (FRA)	Ianis Triomphe (FRA)
2026 Épinal	Ianis Triomphe (FRA)	Martin Rudorfer (CZE)	Adam Semerád (CZE)

=== Kayak cross individual Men ===
Championships	Gold	Silver	Bronze
2024 Kraków	Leo Vuitton (FRA)	Oleksandr Fedorenko (UKR)	Anatole Delassus (FRA)
2025 Solkan	Jan Ločnikar (SLO)	Martin Cornu (FRA)	Tadeusz Kuchno (POL)
2026 Épinal	Sam Leaver (GBR)	Martin Rudorfer (CZE)	Gino Benini (FRA)

=== Canoe Single (C1) Women ===
Championships	Gold	Silver	Bronze
2010 Markkleeberg (non-medal event)	Michaela Grimm (GER)	Claire Jacquet (FRA)	Sabrina Barm (GER)
2011 Banja Luka	Oriane Rebours (FRA)	Núria Vilarrubla (ESP)	Alice Spencer (GBR)
2012 Solkan	Monika Jančová (CZE)	Viktoriia Dobrotvorska (UKR)	Lena Stöcklin (GER)
2013 Bourg-Saint-Maurice	Mallory Franklin (GBR)	Núria Vilarrubla (ESP)	Monika Jančová (CZE)
2014 Skopje	Mallory Franklin (GBR)	Núria Vilarrubla (ESP)	Monika Jančová (CZE)
2015 Kraków	Monika Jančová (CZE)	Núria Vilarrubla (ESP)	Jana Matulková (CZE)
2016 Solkan	Kimberley Woods (GBR)	Jasmine Royle (GBR)	Viktoria Wolffhardt (AUT)
2017 Hohenlimburg	Miren Lazkano (ESP)	Viktoria Wolffhardt (AUT)	Nadine Weratschnig (AUT)
2018 Bratislava	Monika Škáchová (SVK)	Tereza Fišerová (CZE)	Margaux Henry (FRA)
2019 Liptovský Mikuláš	Marjorie Delassus (FRA)	Martina Satková (CZE)	Tereza Fišerová (CZE)
2020 Kraków	Elena Apel (GER)	Gabriela Satková (CZE)	Andrea Herzog (GER)
2021 Solkan	Tereza Fišerová (CZE)	Bethan Forrow (GBR)	Monica Doria Vilarrubla (AND)
2022 České Budějovice	Gabriela Satková (CZE)	Tereza Kneblová (CZE)	Fanchon Janssen (FRA)
2023 Bratislava	Gabriela Satková (CZE)	Zuzana Paňková (SVK)	Doriane Delassus (FRA)
2024 Kraków	Eva Alina Hočevar (SLO)	Ellis Miller (GBR)	Emanuela Luknárová (SVK)
2025 Solkan	Eva Alina Hočevar (SLO)	Elena Borghi (ITA)	Doriane Delassus (FRA)
2026 Épinal	Christin Heydenreich (GER)	Elena Micozzi (ITA)	Nora López (ESP)

=== Kayak (K1) Women ===
Championships	Gold	Silver	Bronze
2002 Bratislava	Kateřina Hošková (CZE)	Laura Blakeman (GBR)	Aline Tornare (FRA)
2004 Kraków	Jana Dukátová (SVK)	Maialen Chourraut (ESP)	Dana Beňušová (SVK)
2005 Kraków	Jana Dukátová (SVK)	Melanie Pfeifer (GER)	Fiona Pennie (GBR)
2006 Nottingham	Jana Dukátová (SVK)	Melanie Pfeifer (GER)	Dorothée Utz (GER)
2007 Kraków	Melanie Pfeifer (GER)	Heike Frauenrath (GER)	Clotilde Miclo (FRA)
2008 Solkan	Melanie Pfeifer (GER)	Urša Kragelj (SLO)	Corinna Kuhnle (AUT)
2009 Liptovský Mikuláš	Kateřina Kudějová (CZE)	Cindy Pöschel (GER)	Natalia Pacierpnik (POL)
2010 Markkleeberg	Jacqueline Horn (GER)	Kateřina Kudějová (CZE)	Corinna Kuhnle (AUT)
2011 Banja Luka	Eva Terčelj (SLO)	Maria Clara Giai Pron (ITA)	Ricarda Funk (GER)
2012 Solkan	Eva Terčelj (SLO)	Kateřina Kudějová (CZE)	Maria Clara Giai Pron (ITA)
2013 Bourg-Saint-Maurice	Ricarda Funk (GER)	Nouria Newman (FRA)	Estelle Mangin (FRA)
2014 Skopje	Stefanie Horn (ITA)	Karolína Galušková (CZE)	Eva Terčelj (SLO)
2015 Kraków	Núria Vilarrubla (ESP)	Viktoria Wolffhardt (AUT)	Viktoriia Us (UKR)
2016 Solkan	Viktoria Wolffhardt (AUT)	Kimberley Woods (GBR)	Lisa Fritsche (GER)
2017 Hohenlimburg	Viktoria Wolffhardt (AUT)	Karolína Galušková (CZE)	Camille Prigent (FRA)
2018 Bratislava	Klaudia Zwolińska (POL)	Anna Faber (GER)	Karolína Galušková (CZE)
2019 Liptovský Mikuláš	Tereza Fišerová (CZE)	Klaudia Zwolińska (POL)	Eliška Mintálová (SVK)
2020 Kraków	Elena Apel (GER)	Klaudia Zwolińska (POL)	Antonie Galušková (CZE)
2021 Solkan	Klaudia Zwolińska (POL)	Soňa Stanovská (SVK)	Tereza Fišerová (CZE)
2022 České Budějovice	Antonie Galušková (CZE)	Angèle Hug (FRA)	Emily Apel (GER)
2023 Bratislava	Lucie Nesnídalová (CZE)	Antonie Galušková (CZE)	Lea Novak (SLO)
2024 Kraków	Eva Pietracha (FRA)	Lucie Nesnídalová (CZE)	Eva Alina Hočevar (SLO)
2025 Solkan	Eva Alina Hočevar (SLO)	Lucia Pistoni (ITA)	Lucie Nesnídalová (CZE)
2026 Épinal	Dominika Brzeska (POL)	Emma Vuitton (FRA)	Lucia Pistoni (ITA)

=== Kayak cross Women ===
Championships	Gold	Silver	Bronze
2021 Solkan	Tereza Fišerová (CZE)	Nikita Setchell (GBR)	Alsu Minazova (RUS)
2022 České Budějovice	Eva Alina Hočevar (SLO)	Olatz Arregui (ESP)	Eva Pietracha (FRA)
2023 Bratislava	Doriane Delassus (FRA)	Zuzana Paňková (SVK)	Emily Apel (GER)
2024 Kraków	Doriane Delassus (FRA)	Lois Leaver (GBR)	Tereza Kneblová (CZE)
2025 Solkan	Nina Pesce-Roue (FRA)	Eva Alina Hočevar (SLO)	Tereza Kneblová (CZE)
2026 Épinal	Paulina Pirro (GER)	Katherine Shattock (GBR)	Léna Quémérais (FRA)

=== Kayak cross individual Women ===
Championships	Gold	Silver	Bronze
2024 Kraków	Lois Leaver (GBR)	Doriane Delassus (FRA)	Emma Vuitton (FRA)
2025 Solkan	Tereza Kneblová (CZE)	Kateřina Beková (CZE)	Eva Alina Hočevar (SLO)
2026 Épinal	Leire Goñi (ESP)	Fia Bütikofer (SUI)	Olga Samková (CZE)

=== Canoe Double (C2) Mixed ===
Championships	Gold	Silver	Bronze
2018 Bratislava (exhibition event)	Marcello Semenza/Francesca Malaguti (ITA)	-	-

== Teams ==
=== Canoe Single (C1) Men Teams ===
Championships	Gold	Silver	Bronze
2004 Kraków	Germany; Jan Benzien; Lukas Hoffmann; Florian Beck	Poland; Krzysztof Supowicz; Grzegorz Kiljanek; Grzegorz Wójs	France; Hervé Chevrier; Eric Deguil; Pierre Labarelle
2005 Kraków	Poland; Krzysztof Supowicz; Grzegorz Wójs; Grzegorz Kiljanek	Germany; Timo Wirsching; Martin Unger; Lukas Hoffmann	Great Britain; David Florence; Adam Marshall; Daniel Goddard
2006 Nottingham	Poland; Adam Czaja; Grzegorz Kiljanek; Krzysztof Supowicz	Slovenia; Jošt Zakrajšek; Benjamin Savšek; Marko Čivčija	Germany; Lukas Hoffmann; Vitali Zirka; Timo Wirsching
2007 Kraków	Poland; Dawid Bartos; Grzegorz Hedwig; Grzegorz Kiljanek	Germany; Vitali Zirka; Martin Unger; Lukas Hoffmann	France; Denis Gargaud Chanut; Jonathan Marc; Nicolas Peschier
2008 Solkan	Poland; Dawid Bartos; Grzegorz Hedwig; Piotr Szczepański	Czech Republic; Petr Karásek; Pavel Foukal; Jan Busta	France; Denis Gargaud Chanut; Jonathan Marc; Edern Le Ruyet
2009 Liptovský Mikuláš	Slovenia; Benjamin Savšek; Jure Lenarčič; Anže Berčič	France; Denis Gargaud Chanut; Pierre-Antoine Tillard; Pierre Berthelot-Kleck	Russia; Pavel Bizyaev; Maxim Obraztsov; Stepan Novikov
2010 Markkleeberg	Germany; Alexander Funk; Franz Anton; Sideris Tasiadis	Slovenia; Benjamin Savšek; Jure Lenarčič; Anže Berčič	Slovakia; Matej Beňuš; Karol Rozmuš; Jerguš Baďura
2011 Banja Luka	Czech Republic; Jan Busta; Tomáš Rak; Martin Říha	Great Britain; Mark Proctor; Thomas Quinn; Adam Burgess	Germany; Franz Anton; Alexander Funk; Florian Mannheim
2012 Solkan	Slovenia; Anže Berčič; Jure Lenarčič; Blaž Cof	Czech Republic; Jan Busta; Tomáš Rak; Martin Říha	France; Martin Thomas; Thibaud Vielliard; Cédric Joly
2013 Bourg-Saint-Maurice	France; Maxime Perron; Simon Le Friec; Kilian Foulon	Poland; Kacper Gondek; Wojciech Pasiut; Arkadiusz Nieć	Spain; David Pérez; Aitor Garmendia; Lluis Pares
2014 Skopje	France; Maxime Perron; Simon Le Friec; Kilian Foulon	Great Britain; Ryan Westley; Thomas Quinn; Thomas Abbott	Russia; Ruslan Sayfiev; Alexander Ovchinikov; Kirill Setkin
2015 Kraków	Russia; Kirill Setkin; Alexander Nepogodin; Alexander Ovchinikov	Italy; Raffaello Ivaldi; Roberto Colazingari; Paolo Ceccon	France; Kilian Foulon; Cédric Joly; Thibault Blaise
2016 Solkan	France; Cédric Joly; Thibault Blaise; Erwan Marchais	Russia; Kirill Setkin; Nikolay Shkliaruk; Alexander Nepogodin	Germany; Florian Breuer; Dennis Söter; Gregor Kreul
2017 Hohenlimburg	France; Lucas Roisin; Erwan Marchais; Cédric Joly	Germany; Timo Trummer; Florian Breuer; Leon Hanika	Czech Republic; Václav Chaloupka; Lukáš Rohan; Jan Větrovský
2018 Bratislava	Czech Republic; Lukáš Rohan; Václav Chaloupka; Matyáš Lhota	Slovakia; Marko Mirgorodský; Martin Dodok; Marko Gurečka	France; Cédric Joly; Valentin Marteil; Lucas Roisin
2019 Liptovský Mikuláš	Italy; Raffaello Ivaldi; Paolo Ceccon; Flavio Micozzi	Czech Republic; Vojtěch Heger; Václav Chaloupka; Jan Větrovský	Slovenia; Urh Turnšek; Klemen Vidmar; Tine Kancler
2020 Kraków	Russia; Dmitrii Khramtsov; Mikhail Kruglov; Pavel Kotov	Czech Republic; Vojtěch Heger; Václav Chaloupka; Jan Větrovský	Germany; Lennard Tuchscherer; Florian Breuer; Julian Lindolf
2021 Solkan	France; Jules Bernardet; Alexis Bobon; Yohann Senechault	Czech Republic; Václav Chaloupka; Vojtěch Heger; Matyáš Lhota	Germany; Lennard Tuchscherer; Paul Seumel; Hannes Seumel
2022 České Budějovice	Slovenia; Nejc Polenčič; Juš Javornik; Žiga Lin Hočevar	Great Britain; Peter Linksted; James Kettle; Kurts Rozentals	Poland; Kacper Sztuba; Szymon Nowobilski; Konrad Szymanek
2023 Bratislava	Great Britain; James Kettle; Peter Linksted; Kurts Rozentals	France; Mewen Debliquy; Yohann Senechault; Adrien Fischer	Slovenia; Juš Javornik; Nejc Polenčič; Žiga Lin Hočevar
2024 Kraków	Slovenia; Žiga Lin Hočevar; Nejc Polenčič; Juš Javornik	France; Mewen Debliquy; Yohann Senechault; Tanguy Adisson	Great Britain; Edward McDonald; Luc Royle; Kurts Rozentals
2025 Solkan	France; Elouan Debliquy; Martin Cornu; Yohann Senechault	Poland; Szymon Nowobilski; Krzysztof Książek; Szymon Sowiźrał	Italy; Elio Maiutto; Martino Barzon; Marino Spagnol
2026 Épinal	Germany; Niels Zimmermann; Konrad Ginzel; Anton Weber	France; Elouan Debliquy; Mewen Debliquy; Titouan Estanguet	Spain; Alex Segura; Markel Imaz; Marc Vicente

=== Canoe Double (C2) Men Teams ===
Championships	Gold	Silver	Bronze
2004 Kraków	Poland; Marcin Pochwała/Paweł Sarna; Jarosław Miczek/Wojciech Sekuła; Bartłomiej Kruczek/Dariusz Wrzosek	France; Damien Troquenet/Mathieu Voyemant; Remy Gaspard/Julien Gaspard; Martin Braud/Cédric Forgit	Slovakia; Ladislav Škantár/Peter Škantár; Ján Šácha/Jakub Luley; Marek Marcinek/Pavol Marcinek
2005 Kraków	Poland; Bartłomiej Kruczek/Dariusz Wrzosek; Paweł Sarna/Marcin Pochwała; Jarosław Miczek/Wojciech Sekuła	Czech Republic; Martin Hammer/Ladislav Vlček; Tomáš Koplík/Jakub Vrzáň; Václav Hradilek/Štěpán Sehnal	Germany; Felix Michel/Sebastian Piersig; Daniel Junker/Martin Krenzer; Michael Bartsch/Michael Wiedemann
2006 Nottingham (non-medal event)	France; Mathieu Fougere/Thomas Fougere; Gauthier Klauss/Matthieu Péché; Mathieu Voyemant/Damien Troquenet	Germany; Daniel Junker/Martin Krenzer; Michael Bartsch/Michael Wiedemann; Felix Michel/Sebastian Piersig	Czech Republic; Jan Zdráhal/Petr Zdráhal; Tomáš Koplík/Jakub Vrzáň; Ladislav Vlček/Martin Hammer
2007 Kraków	Poland; Paweł Sarna/Marcin Pochwała; Andrzej Poparda/Kamil Gondek; Dawid Dobrowolski/Dominik Węglarz	Czech Republic; Martin Hammer/Ladislav Vlček; Tomáš Koplík/Jakub Vrzáň; Petr Zdráhal/Jan Zdráhal	France; Gauthier Klauss/Matthieu Péché; Mathieu Fougere/Thomas Fougere; Hugo Biso/Pierre Picco
2008 Solkan (non-medal event)	Germany; Kai Müller/Kevin Müller; Daniel Junker/Martin Krenzer; Mirko Arold/Maik Wiedemann	Czech Republic; Martin Hammer/Ladislav Vlček; Jan Zdráhal/Petr Zdráhal; Tomáš Koplík/Jakub Vrzáň	Slovenia; Luka Slapšak/Blaž Oven; Nejc Višnar/Urban Jarc; Luka Božič/Sašo Taljat
2009 Liptovský Mikuláš	France; Hugo Biso/Pierre Picco; Aymeric Maynadier/Sébastien Perilhou; Mathieu Fougere/Thomas Fougere	Germany; Mathias Westphal/Paul Jork; Simon Auerbach/Florian Schubert; Kai Müller/Kevin Müller	Czech Republic; Robert Gotvald/Jan Vlček; Tomáš Koplík/Jakub Vrzáň; Ondřej Karlovský/Jakub Jáně
2010 Markkleeberg	Germany; Holger Gerdes/Jan-Phillip Eckert; Robert Behling/Thomas Becker; Kai Müller/Kevin Müller	Czech Republic; Jonáš Kašpar/Marek Šindler; Robert Gotvald/Jan Vlček; Ondřej Karlovský/Jakub Jáně	Poland; Dariusz Chlebek/Patryk Brzeziński; Kamil Gondek/Andrzej Poparda; Karol Kasprzak/Marcin Kasprzak
2011 Banja Luka	Czech Republic; Jonáš Kašpar/Marek Šindler; Ondřej Karlovský/Jakub Jáně; Robert Gotvald/Jan Vlček	Germany; Mathias Westphal/Paul Jork; Robert Behling/Thomas Becker; Eric Mendel/Otto-Max Klein	Great Britain; Thomas Quinn/George Tatchell; Rhys Davies/Matthew Lister; Adam Burgess/Greg Pitt
2012 Solkan	Poland; Filip Brzeziński/Andrzej Brzeziński; Michał Wiercioch/Grzegorz Majerczak; Dariusz Chlebek/Dominik Węglarz	Czech Republic; Ondřej Karlovský/Jakub Jáně; Jonáš Kašpar/Marek Šindler; Jaroslav Strnad/Martin Říha	Great Britain; Adam Burgess/Greg Pitt; Thomas Quinn/George Tatchell; Rhys Davies/Matthew Lister
2013 Bourg-Saint-Maurice	Poland; Filip Brzeziński/Andrzej Brzeziński; Michał Wiercioch/Grzegorz Majerczak; Wojciech Pasiut/Kacper Gondek	Russia; Anton Ushakov/Artem Ushakov; Pavel Kovalkov/Artem Bogdanov; Pavel Eigel/Ruslan Sayfiev	Spain; Ekhi Diez/David Pérez; Jesús Pérez/Aitor Garmendia; Daniel Marzo/Jokin Sánchez
2014 Skopje	France; Yves Prigent/Loïc Kervella; Nicolas Scianimanico/Hugo Cailhol; Guillaume Graille/Lucas Roisin	Germany; Gabriel Holzapfel/Merlin Holzapfel; Aaron Jüttner/Piet Lennart Wagner; Hans Krüger/Paul Sommer	Russia; Vadim Voinalovich/Aleksei Popov; Egor Gover/Dmitriy Azanov; Nikolay Shkliaruk/Igor Mikhailov
2015 Kraków	Poland; Filip Brzeziński/Andrzej Brzeziński; Michał Wiercioch/Grzegorz Majerczak; Adam Kozub/Igor Sztuba	Germany; Milton Witkowski/Paul Sommer; Aaron Jüttner/Piet Lennart Wagner; Florian Beste/Sören Loos	Russia; Aleksei Popov/Vadim Voinalovich; Nikolay Shkliaruk/Igor Mikhailov; Egor Gover/Dmitriy Azanov
2016 Solkan	Poland; Filip Brzeziński/Andrzej Brzeziński; Michał Wiercioch/Grzegorz Majerczak; Jakub Brzeziński/Kacper Sztuba	Russia; Aleksei Popov/Vadim Voinalovich; Nikolay Shkliaruk/Igor Mikhailov; Pavel Kotov/Sergei Komkov	Germany; Niklas Hecht/Alexander Weber; Florian Beste/Sören Loos; Fritz Lehrach/Lennard Tuchscherer

=== Kayak (K1) Men Teams ===
Championships	Gold	Silver	Bronze
2004 Kraków	Germany; Erik Pfannmöller; Friedemann Barthel; Fabian Dörfler	Slovenia; Peter Kauzer; Jure Meglič; Andrej Nolimal	Czech Republic; Lukáš Kubričan; Jiří Rejha; Jindřich Beneš
2005 Kraków	Poland; Grzegorz Polaczyk; Henryk Polaczyk; Dariusz Popiela	Italy; Daniele Molmenti; Stefano Cipressi; Diego Paolini	Czech Republic; Lukáš Kubričan; Luboš Hilgert; Jindřich Beneš
2006 Nottingham	Poland; Henryk Polaczyk; Grzegorz Polaczyk; Dariusz Popiela	Germany; Jürgen Kraus; Robert Süssenbach; Jens Ewald	Italy; Andrea Romeo; Enrico Gheno; Daniele Molmenti
2007 Kraków	Poland; Grzegorz Polaczyk; Mateusz Polaczyk; Dariusz Popiela	Italy; Daniele Molmenti; Andrea Romeo; Riccardo De Gennaro	Czech Republic; Vavřinec Hradilek; Luboš Hilgert; Lukáš Kubričan
2008 Solkan	France; Pierre Bourliaud; Sébastien Combot; Raphaël Reveche	Italy; Lukas Mayr; Riccardo De Gennaro; Andrea Romeo	Poland; Grzegorz Polaczyk; Mateusz Polaczyk; Łukasz Polaczyk
2009 Liptovský Mikuláš	France; Sébastien Combot; Boris Neveu; Benoît Guillaume	Germany; Jürgen Kraus; Paul Böckelmann; Hannes Aigner	Slovenia; Martin Albreht; Simon Artelj; Gregor Brovinsky
2010 Markkleeberg	France; Étienne Daille; Vivien Colober; Sébastien Combot	Poland; Michał Pasiut; Mateusz Polaczyk; Łukasz Polaczyk	Italy; Riccardo De Gennaro; Lukas Mayr; Omar Raiba
2011 Banja Luka	Czech Republic; Vít Přindiš; Jan Vondra; Ondřej Tunka	Russia; Pavel Eigel; Evgeniy Doronin; Denis Korpachev	Italy; Lukas Mayr; Omar Raiba; Giovanni De Gennaro
2012 Solkan	France; Vivien Colober; Étienne Daille; Bastien Damiens	Czech Republic; Jiří Prskavec; Vít Přindiš; Ondřej Tunka	Slovakia; Martin Halčin; Michal Bárta; Matúš Hujsa
2013 Bourg-Saint-Maurice	Czech Republic; Zdeněk Ornst; Ondřej Tunka; Ondřej Cvikl	France; Vivien Colober; Benjamin Renia; Mathieu Biazizzo	Poland; Rafał Polaczyk; Michał Pasiut; Maciej Okręglak
2014 Skopje	Poland; Rafał Polaczyk; Michał Pasiut; Maciej Okręglak	Germany; Laurenz Laugwitz; Fabian Schweikert; Samuel Hegge	Italy; Giovanni De Gennaro; Luca Colazingari; Christian De Dionigi
2015 Kraków	France; Quentin Burgi; Bastien Damiens; Tom Scianimanico	Germany; Laurenz Laugwitz; Fabian Schweikert; Stefan Hengst	Italy; Giovanni De Gennaro; Zeno Ivaldi; Marcello Beda
2016 Solkan	Slovenia; Simon Brus; Martin Srabotnik; Žan Jakše	Italy; Zeno Ivaldi; Marcello Beda; Marco Vianello	Russia; Maxim Shabanov; Nikita Gubenko; Alexander Nepogodin
2017 Hohenlimburg	France; Mathieu Desnos; Pol Oulhen; Mathurin Madoré	Slovenia; Martin Srabotnik; Žan Jakše; Vid Kuder Marušič	Austria; Mario Leitner; Felix Oschmautz; Matthias Weger
2018 Bratislava	Slovenia; Martin Srabotnik; Niko Testen; Vid Kuder Marušič	Slovakia; Jakub Grigar; Andrej Málek; Jakub Stanovský	Switzerland; Dimitri Marx; Manuel Munsch; Gelindo Chiarello
2019 Liptovský Mikuláš	France; Mathurin Madoré; Pol Oulhen; Malo Quéméneur	Austria; Mario Leitner; Felix Oschmautz; Matthias Weger	Czech Republic; Tomáš Zima; Alexandr Maikranz; Michael Matějka
2020 Kraków	Germany; Noah Hegge; Lukas Stahl; Thomas Strauss	Czech Republic; Tomáš Zima; Jan Bárta; Alexandr Maikranz	Poland; Krzysztof Majerczak; Jakub Brzeziński; Wiktor Sandera
2021 Solkan	France; Malo Quéméneur; Anatole Delassus; Simon Hene	Italy; Davide Ghisetti; Jakob Weger; Marco Romano	Spain; Pau Echaniz; Miquel Travé; Manuel Ochoa
2022 České Budějovice	France; Simon Hene; Anatole Delassus; Pierre Louis Saussereau	Spain; Miquel Travé; Pau Echaniz; Darío Cuesta	Great Britain; Jonny Dickson; Ben Haylett; Etienne Chappell
2023 Bratislava	Spain; Pau Echaniz; Miquel Travé; Alex Goñi	France; Anatole Delassus; Vincent Delahaye; Leo Vuitton	Great Britain; Ben Haylett; Sam Leaver; David Paterson
2024 Kraków	Great Britain; Sam Leaver; Ben Haylett; Jonny Dickson	France; Anatole Delassus; Leo Vuitton; Edgar Paleau-Brasseur	Italy; Xabier Ferrazzi; Gabriele Grimandi; Tommaso Panico
2025 Solkan	Germany; Enrico Dietz; Christian Stanzel; Marten Konrad	France; Martin Cornu; Noe Perreau; Elouan Debliquy	Great Britain; Jonah Hanrahan; Sam Leaver; Thomas Mayer
2026 Épinal	France; Mewen Debliquy; Titouan Estanguet; Unai Oteiza	Great Britain; Jonah Hanrahan; Thomas Mayer; Gwion Williams	Spain; Manel Contreras; Faust Clotet Juanmarti; Miquel Farran

=== Canoe Single (C1) Women Teams ===
Championships	Gold	Silver	Bronze
2010 Markkleeberg (non-medal event)	France; Claire Jacquet; Cécile Tixier; Clara Dos Santos	Germany; Hannah Grünbeck; Jessica Decker; Tammy Behrendt	Germany; Sabrina Barm; Lena Stöcklin; Michaela Grimm
2012 Solkan	Spain; Núria Vilarrubla; Miren Lazkano; Annebel van der Knijff	Germany; Lena Stöcklin; Karolin Wagner; Hannah Grünbeck	Great Britain; Mallory Franklin; Kimberley Woods; Eilidh Gibson
2013 Bourg-Saint-Maurice	France; Cécile Tixier; Annaëlle Meheut; Marlene Rio	Germany; Karolin Wagner; Birgit Ohmayer; Kira Kubbe	Russia; Anastasia Tropkina; Polina Mukhgaleeva; Zulfiia Sabitova
2014 Skopje	Great Britain; Mallory Franklin; Jasmine Royle; Eilidh Gibson	Germany; Andrea Herzog; Rebekka Jüttner; Kira Kubbe	Russia; Polina Mukhgaleeva; Zulfiia Sabitova; Anastasia Tropkina
2015 Kraków	Great Britain; Mallory Franklin; Jasmine Royle; Eilidh Gibson	Spain; Núria Vilarrubla; Miren Lazkano; Annebel van der Knijff	Czech Republic; Jana Matulková; Monika Jančová; Anna Koblencová
2016 Solkan	Great Britain; Kimberley Woods; Jasmine Royle; Eilidh Gibson	Spain; Miren Lazkano; Annebel van der Knijff; Klara Olazabal	Czech Republic; Jana Matulková; Gabriela Satková; Alexandra Vrbová
2017 Hohenlimburg	Czech Republic; Tereza Fišerová; Martina Satková; Jana Matulková	Slovenia; Alja Kozorog; Nina Bizjak; Lea Novak	Slovakia; Simona Maceková; Monika Škáchová; Eva Diešková
2018 Bratislava	Spain; Miren Lazkano; Klara Olazabal; Annebel van der Knijff	France; Lucie Prioux; Marjorie Delassus; Margaux Henry	Slovakia; Simona Glejteková; Simona Maceková; Monika Škáchová
2019 Liptovský Mikuláš	France; Marjorie Delassus; Margaux Henry; Ella Bregazzi	Czech Republic; Tereza Fišerová; Eva Říhová; Martina Satková	Slovakia; Soňa Stanovská; Monika Škáchová; Simona Maceková
2020 Kraków	Czech Republic; Tereza Fišerová; Gabriela Satková; Martina Satková	Germany; Andrea Herzog; Elena Apel; Zoe Jakob	Russia; Alsu Minazova; Daria Shaidurova; Anastasia Kozyreva
2021 Solkan	Czech Republic; Martina Satková; Gabriela Satková; Tereza Fišerová	Spain; Klara Olazabal; Ainhoa Lameiro; Clara González	Poland; Aleksandra Stach; Klaudia Zwolińska; Katarzyna Liber
2022 České Budějovice	Czech Republic; Gabriela Satková; Eva Říhová; Tereza Kneblová	Germany; Hannah Süss; Zoe Jakob; Jannemien Panzlaff	Great Britain; Bethan Forrow; Sophie Ogilvie; Ellis Miller
2023 Bratislava	Czech Republic; Eva Říhová; Gabriela Satková; Tereza Kneblová	Slovakia; Zuzana Paňková; Emanuela Luknárová; Soňa Stanovská	Italy; Marta Bertoncelli; Elena Micozzi; Elena Borghi
2024 Kraków	Italy; Marta Bertoncelli; Elena Micozzi; Elena Borghi	Czech Republic; Klára Kneblová; Adriana Morenová; Tereza Kneblová	France; Camille Castryck; Doriane Delassus; Nina Pesce-Roue
2025 Solkan	Czech Republic; Adriana Morenová; Tereza Kneblová; Olga Samková	Germany; Kimberley Rappe; Amelie Plochmann; Lucie Krech	France; Doriane Delassus; Zoe Laurent; Nina Pesce-Roue
2026 Épinal	Germany; Amelie Plochmann; Paulina Pirro; Christin Heydenreich	Spain; Nora López; Malen Gutiérrez; Ainara Goikoetxea	Czech Republic; Julie Štěpánková; Adriana Morenová; Anna Fabianová

=== Kayak (K1) Women Teams ===
Championships	Gold	Silver	Bronze
2004 Kraków	Czech Republic; Marie Řihošková; Kateřina Hošková; Petra Slováková	Germany; Gina Kaluza; Katja Frauenrath; Michaela Grimm	Great Britain; Michelle Patrick; Fiona Pennie; Claire Harrower
2005 Kraków	Germany; Jasmin Schornberg; Mira Louen; Melanie Pfeifer	Slovakia; Jana Dukátová; Katarína Macová; Dana Beňušová	France; Carole Bouzidi; Clotilde Miclo; Émilie Fer
2006 Nottingham	Germany; Dorothée Utz; Mira Louen; Melanie Pfeifer	Great Britain; Claire Harrower; Louise Donington; Lizzie Neave	France; Carole Bouzidi; Marie-Zélia Lafont; Émilie Fer
2007 Kraków	Germany; Heike Frauenrath; Katja Frauenrath; Melanie Pfeifer	France; Clotilde Miclo; Carole Bouzidi; Elisa Venet	Slovenia; Urša Kragelj; Eva Terčelj; Nika Mozetič
2008 Solkan	Germany; Melanie Pfeifer; Katja Frauenrath; Jacqueline Horn	Russia; Ekaterina Perova; Ekaterina Klimanova; Ulyana Slotina	Poland; Natalia Pacierpnik; Małgorzata Milczarek; Anna Ingier
2009 Liptovský Mikuláš	Germany; Cindy Pöschel; Michaela Grimm; Jacqueline Horn	France; Marie-Zélia Lafont; Caroline Loir; Laura Mangin	Czech Republic; Eva Ornstová; Kateřina Kudějová; Miroslava Urbanová
2010 Markkleeberg	Slovenia; Urša Kragelj; Nina Slapšak; Eva Terčelj	Germany; Stefanie Horn; Cindy Pöschel; Jacqueline Horn	Austria; Corinna Kuhnle; Viktoria Wolffhardt; Lisa Leitner
2011 Banja Luka	Czech Republic; Kateřina Kudějová; Veronika Vojtová; Eva Ornstová	Austria; Viktoria Wolffhardt; Lisa Leitner; Julia Schmid	Germany; Jacqueline Horn; Stefanie Horn; Ricarda Funk
2012 Solkan	Germany; Ricarda Funk; Stefanie Horn; Lisa Fritsche	Spain; Marta Martínez; Núria Vilarrubla; Meritxell Rodríguez	Czech Republic; Kateřina Kudějová; Eva Ornstová; Pavlína Zástěrová
2013 Bourg-Saint-Maurice	Czech Republic; Kateřina Kudějová; Veronika Vojtová; Pavlína Zástěrová	Italy; Stefanie Horn; Maria Clara Giai Pron; Chiara Sabattini	France; Estelle Mangin; Nouria Newman; Josepha Longa
2014 Skopje	Slovenia; Eva Terčelj; Ajda Novak; Nina Bizjak	Germany; Lisa Fritsche; Caroline Trompeter; Leonie Meyer	France; Estelle Mangin; Lucie Baudu; Cécile Tixier
2015 Kraków	Czech Republic; Barbora Valíková; Pavlína Zástěrová; Kateřina Dušková	Great Britain; Amy Hollick; Mallory Franklin; Bethan Latham	Austria; Viktoria Wolffhardt; Nina Weratschnig; Valentina Dreier
2016 Solkan	Germany; Lisa Fritsche; Caroline Trompeter; Selina Jones	Czech Republic; Karolína Galušková; Amálie Hilgertová; Barbora Valíková	Spain; Laia Sorribes; Irene Egües; Julia Cuchi
2017 Hohenlimburg	Netherlands; Lena Teunissen; Claudia Leenders; Maartje Otten	Germany; Caroline Trompeter; Selina Jones; Eva Pohlen	Poland; Klaudia Zwolińska; Sara Ćwik; Edyta Rosiek
2018 Bratislava	France; Camille Prigent; Romane Prigent; Marjorie Delassus	Great Britain; Megan Hamer-Evans; Sophie Ogilvie; Gabrielle Ridge	Czech Republic; Amálie Hilgertová; Karolína Galušková; Kateřina Dušková
2019 Liptovský Mikuláš	Czech Republic; Amálie Hilgertová; Tereza Fišerová; Gabriela Satková	Slovakia; Eliška Mintálová; Soňa Stanovská; Simona Maceková	Germany; Anna Faber; Stella Mehlhorn; Selina Jones
2020 Kraków	Russia; Kseniia Krylova; Alsu Minazova; Daria Kuznetsova	Germany; Elena Apel; Selina Jones; Franziska Hanke	Czech Republic; Antonie Galušková; Amálie Hilgertová; Kateřina Dušková
2021 Solkan	Slovakia; Michaela Haššová; Soňa Stanovská; Kristína Ďurecová	Great Britain; Nikita Setchell; Phoebe Spicer; Lois Leaver	Germany; Franziska Hanke; Nele Gosse; Stella Mehlhorn
2022 České Budějovice	Germany; Annkatrin Plochmann; Emily Apel; Franziska Hanke	France; Romane Prigent; Emma Vuitton; Angèle Hug	Great Britain; Megan Hamer-Evans; Phoebe Spicer; Lois Leaver
2023 Bratislava	France; Doriane Delassus; Eva Pietracha; Coline Charel	Slovakia; Ivana Chlebová; Zuzana Paňková; Soňa Stanovská	Slovenia; Eva Alina Hočevar; Lea Novak; Sara Belingar
2024 Kraków	France; Emma Vuitton; Eva Pietracha; Ilona Martin Laemle	Germany; Antonia Plochmann; Emily Apel; Paulina Pirro	Czech Republic; Lucie Nesnídalová; Kateřina Beková; Klára Kneblová
2025 Solkan	Czech Republic; Kateřina Beková; Lucie Nesnídalová; Klára Mrázková	Germany; Paulina Pirro; Antonia Plochmann; Emily Apel	Italy; Lucia Pistoni; Caterina Pignat; Milena Marini
2026 Épinal	France; Emma Vuitton; Ilona Martin Laemle; Nina Pesce-Roue	Germany; Paulina Pirro; Antonia Plochmann; Mina Blume	Slovenia; Ula Skok; Sara Belingar; Sara Globokar
