= 2018 European Junior and U23 Canoe Slalom Championships =

- Location: Bratislava, Slovakia

The 2018 European Junior and U23 Canoe Slalom Championships took place in Bratislava, Slovakia from 16 to 19 August 2018 under the auspices of the European Canoe Association (ECA) at the Čunovo Water Sports Centre. It was the 20th edition of the competition for Juniors (U18) and the 16th edition for the Under 23 category. A total of 16 medal events took place, 8 in each of the two age categories. In addition, there were two exhibition events. One in the discontinued men's C2 category and the other in the mixed C2. The senior Freestyle European Championships were held as part of the same event.

== Medal summary ==
=== Men ===
==== Canoe ====
===== Junior =====
Event	Gold		Silver		Bronze	
C1	Miquel Travé (ESP)	94.03	Nicolas Gestin (FRA)	99.14	Flavio Micozzi (ITA)	99.17
C1 team	Czech Republic; Vojtěch Heger; Petr Novotný; Eduard Lerch	115.74	France; Nicolas Gestin; Alexis Bobon; Jules Bernardet	120.93	Germany; Leo Braune; Hannes Seumel; Julian Lindolf	123.06

===== U23 =====
Event	Gold		Silver		Bronze	
C1	Cédric Joly (FRA)	90.16	Valentin Marteil (FRA)	91.76	Przemysław Nowak (POL)	93.42
C1 team	Czech Republic; Lukáš Rohan; Václav Chaloupka; Matyáš Lhota	104.20	Slovakia; Marko Mirgorodský; Martin Dodok; Marko Gurečka	109.26	France; Cédric Joly; Valentin Marteil; Lucas Roisin	109.41

==== Kayak ====
===== Junior =====
Event	Gold		Silver		Bronze	
K1	Miquel Travé (ESP)	85.70	Tomáš Zima (CZE)	86.49	Jan Bárta (CZE)	86.75
K1 team	France; Anatole Delassus; Vincent Delahaye; Julien Pajaud	100.71	Italy; Jakob Luther; Valentin Luther; Leonardo Grimandi	108.25	Czech Republic; Tomáš Zima; Jan Bárta; Jakub Krejčí	108.54

===== U23 =====
Event	Gold		Silver		Bronze	
K1	David Llorente (ESP)	84.17	Jakub Grigar (SVK)	85.74	Lukas Stahl (GER)	85.77
K1 team	Slovenia; Martin Srabotnik; Niko Testen; Vid Kuder Marušič	98.11	Slovakia; Jakub Grigar; Andrej Málek; Jakub Stanovský	100.13	Switzerland; Dimitri Marx; Manuel Munsch; Gelindo Chiarello	103.09

=== Women ===
==== Canoe ====
===== Junior =====
Event	Gold		Silver		Bronze	
C1	Daria Shaidurova (RUS)	112.53	Soňa Stanovská (SVK)	112.96	Gabriela Satková (CZE)	114.36
C1 team	Czech Republic; Gabriela Satková; Eva Říhová; Tereza Kneblová	136.81	Slovakia; Soňa Stanovská; Emanuela Luknárová; Mahuliena Ďurecová	151.93	Germany; Zoe Jakob; Nele Bayn; Zola Lewandowski	172.68

===== U23 =====
Event	Gold		Silver		Bronze	
C1	Monika Škáchová (SVK)	102.56	Tereza Fišerová (CZE)	105.59	Margaux Henry (FRA)	111.40
C1 team	Spain; Miren Lazkano; Klara Olazabal; Annebel van der Knijff	130.95	France; Lucie Prioux; Marjorie Delassus; Margaux Henry	149.19	Slovakia; Simona Glejteková; Simona Maceková; Monika Škáchová	150.77

==== Kayak ====
===== Junior =====
Event	Gold		Silver		Bronze	
K1	Nikita Setchell (GBR)	99.09	Eva Alina Hočevar (SLO)	101.92	Antonie Galušková (CZE)	102.41
K1 team	Czech Republic; Antonie Galušková; Lucie Nesnídalová; Kateřina Beková	128.57	Russia; Elizaveta Terekhova; Daria Shaidurova; Evdokia Podobryaeva	131.96	Great Britain; Lois Leaver; Lili Bryant; Nikita Setchell	133.17

===== U23 =====
Event	Gold		Silver		Bronze	
K1	Klaudia Zwolińska (POL)	96.37	Anna Faber (GER)	97.77	Karolína Galušková (CZE)	99.96
K1 team	France; Camille Prigent; Romane Prigent; Marjorie Delassus	123.12	Great Britain; Megan Hamer-Evans; Sophie Ogilvie; Gabrielle Ridge	123.45	Czech Republic; Amálie Hilgertová; Karolína Galušková; Kateřina Dušková	125.20

=== Exhibition ===
Two exhibition events took place at the championships. The U23 men's C2 event had three boats competing. The U23 mixed C2 event had three entries, but only one boat started. It was a single run competition and no medals were awarded.

==== U23 Men ====
Event	Gold		Silver		Bronze	
C2	Nikolay Shkliaruk/Igor Mikhailov (RUS)	103.65	Albert Kašpar/Vojtěch Mrůzek (CZE)	166.48	Pavel Kotov/Sergei Komkov (RUS)	211.89

==== U23 Mixed ====
Event	Gold		Silver	Bronze
C2	Marcello Semenza/Francesca Malaguti (ITA)	232.35	-	-

== Medal table ==
Rank	Nation	Gold	Silver	Bronze	Total
1	Czech Republic (CZE)	4	2	6	12
2	Spain (ESP)	4	0	0	4
3	France (FRA)	3	4	2	9
4	Slovakia (SVK)	1	5	1	7
5	Great Britain (GBR)	1	1	1	3
6	Russia (RUS)	1	1	0	2
6	Slovenia (SLO)	1	1	0	2
8	Poland (POL)	1	0	1	2
9	Germany (GER)	0	1	3	4
10	Italy (ITA)	0	1	1	2
11	Switzerland (SUI)	0	0	1	1
Totals (11 entries)		16	16	16	48
