= 2013 World Junior and U23 Canoe Slalom Championships =

The 2013 ICF World Junior and U23 Canoe Slalom Championships took place in Liptovský Mikuláš, Slovakia from 17 to 21 July 2013 under the auspices of the International Canoe Federation (ICF) at the Ondrej Cibak Whitewater Slalom Course. It was the 15th edition of the competition for Juniors (U18) and the 2nd edition for the Under 23 category.

No medals were awarded for the men's U23 C2 event because it did not meet the criteria for a medal event. In an Olympic event there need to be at least 6 countries from 3 continents represented to count as a world championship event.

== Medal summary ==
=== Men ===
==== Canoe ====
===== Junior =====
Event	Gold	Points	Silver	Points	Bronze	Points
C1	Cédric Joly (FRA)	110.01	Lukáš Rohan (CZE)	114.68	Jakob Jeklin (SLO)	115.32
C1 team	Slovakia; Marko Gurečka; Tomáš Džurný; Martin Mračna	135.00	Germany; Florian Breuer; Philipp Reichenbach; Willi Braune	136.03	France; Cédric Joly; Julian Othenin-Girard; Erwan Marchais	139.00
C2	Matúš Gewissler/Juraj Skákala (SVK)	122.87	Aleksei Popov/Vadim Voinalovich (RUS)	126.65	Aaron Jüttner/Piet Lennart Wagner (GER)	127.18
C2 team	Slovakia; Matúš Gewissler/Juraj Skákala; Martin Šimičák/Jakub Skubík; Igor Michalovič/Jakub Tomko	174.33	Poland; Jakub Brzeziński/Adam Kozub; Wojciech Klata/Krzysztof Zych; Kacper Ćwik/Dominik Janur	200.84	Germany; Hans Krüger/Paul Sommer; Aaron Jüttner/Piet Lennart Wagner; Florian Beste/Sören Loos	219.96

===== U23 =====
Event	Gold	Points	Silver	Points	Bronze	Points
C1	Patrik Gajarský (SVK)	105.37	Martin Říha (CZE)	106.48	Jerguš Baďura (SVK)	106.49
C1 team	Slovenia; Jure Lenarčič; Luka Božič; Anže Berčič	124.71	Poland; Wojciech Pasiut; Kacper Gondek; Arkadiusz Nieć	127.93	France; Maxime Perron; Simon Le Friec; Kilian Foulon	130.52
C2 (non-medal event)	Lukáš Rohan/Adam Svoboda (CZE)	115.96	Jonáš Kašpar/Marek Šindler (CZE)	116.28	Filip Brzeziński/Andrzej Brzeziński (POL)	116.63
C2 team	Czech Republic; Ondřej Karlovský/Jakub Jáně; Jonáš Kašpar/Marek Šindler; Lukáš Rohan/Adam Svoboda	128.57	Poland; Filip Brzeziński/Andrzej Brzeziński; Michał Wiercioch/Grzegorz Majerczak; Dariusz Chlebek/Dominik Węglarz	144.10	France; Jimy Berçon/Marc Biazizzo; Yves Prigent/Loïc Kervella; Nicolas Scianimanico/Hugo Cailhol	146.16

==== Kayak ====
===== Junior =====
Event	Gold	Points	Silver	Points	Bronze	Points
K1	Jakub Grigar (SVK)	98.28	Andrej Málek (SVK)	100.59	Bastien Damiens (FRA)	102.29
K1 team	France; Bastien Damiens; Mathys Huvelin; Quentin Mignard	116.24	Slovakia; Jakub Grigar; Andrej Málek; Peter Blasbalg	116.33	Slovenia; Martin Srabotnik; Vid Karner; Vid Kuder Marušič	116.81

===== U23 =====
Event	Gold	Points	Silver	Points	Bronze	Points
K1	Mathieu Biazizzo (FRA)	96.85	Jiří Prskavec (CZE)	98.17	Giovanni De Gennaro (ITA)	98.31
K1 team	Germany; Tobias Kargl; Fabian Schweikert; Stefan Hengst	114.94	Great Britain; Thomas Brady; Joe Clarke; Michael Wilson	116.86	Slovakia; Martin Halčin; Miroslav Urban; Matúš Hujsa	117.06

=== Women ===
==== Canoe ====
===== Junior =====
Event	Gold	Points	Silver	Points	Bronze	Points
C1	Karolin Wagner (GER)	143.24	Anna Koblencová (CZE)	145.39	Ana Sátila (BRA)	145.43
C1 team	Australia; Noemie Fox; Georgia Rankin; Alexandra Broome	188.19	Germany; Karolin Wagner; Birgit Ohmayer; Kira Kubbe	198.43	Great Britain; Kimberley Woods; Eilidh Gibson; Rachel Houston	233.39

===== U23 =====
Event	Gold	Points	Silver	Points	Bronze	Points
C1	Jessica Fox (AUS)	133.62	Viktoria Wolffhardt (AUT); Viktoriia Us (UKR)	136.53; 136.53	-	
C1 team	Great Britain; Emily Woodcock; Mallory Franklin; Jasmine Royle	224.94	Spain; Núria Vilarrubla; Miren Lazkano; Annebel van der Knijff	240.25	Australia; Jessica Fox; Alison Borrows; Margaret Webster	243.67

==== Kayak ====
===== Junior =====
Event	Gold	Points	Silver	Points	Bronze	Points
K1	Amálie Hilgertová (CZE)	122.21	Kimberley Woods (GBR)	124.96	Camille Prigent (FRA)	126.01
K1 team	Czech Republic; Karolína Galušková; Amálie Hilgertová; Tereza Fišerová	152.49	Germany; Anna Faber; Selina Jones; Ann-Kathrin Schwanholt	155.87	Slovenia; Neža Vrevc; Nina Bizjak; Alja Kozorog	165.89

===== U23 =====
Event	Gold	Points	Silver	Points	Bronze	Points
K1	Kateřina Kudějová (CZE)	112.39	Stefanie Horn (ITA)	112.59	Lisa Fritsche (GER)	114.20
K1 team	Czech Republic; Kateřina Kudějová; Veronika Vojtová; Pavlína Zástěrová	135.12	Germany; Ricarda Funk; Fee Maxeiner; Lisa Fritsche	137.86	Russia; Polina Mukhgaleeva; Elena Solodovnikova; Uliana Galkina	146.26

== Medal table ==
Rank	Nation	Gold	Silver	Bronze	Total
1	Czech Republic (CZE)	5	4	0	9
2	Slovakia (SVK)	5	2	2	9
3	France (FRA)	3	0	5	8
4	Germany (GER)	2	4	3	9
5	Australia (AUS)	2	0	1	3
6	Great Britain (GBR)	1	2	1	4
7	Slovenia (SLO)	1	0	3	4
8	Poland (POL)	0	3	0	3
9	Italy (ITA)	0	1	1	2
9	Russia (RUS)	0	1	1	2
11	Austria (AUT)	0	1	0	1
11	Spain (ESP)	0	1	0	1
11	Ukraine (UKR)	0	1	0	1
14	Brazil (BRA)	0	0	1	1
Totals (14 entries)		19	20	18	57
