= 2017 World Junior and U23 Canoe Slalom Championships =

The 2017 ICF World Junior and U23 Canoe Slalom Championships took place in Bratislava, Slovakia from 18 to 23 July 2017 under the auspices of the International Canoe Federation (ICF) at the Čunovo Water Sports Centre. It was the 19th edition of the competition for Juniors (U18) and the 6th edition for the Under 23 category. The C2 mixed event was held for the first time at these championships. It was only contested at the Under 23 level and there was no C2 mixed team event. No medals were awarded for the junior C2 event and the U23 C2 team event due to low number of participating nations. The junior C2 team event did not take place.

A total of 400 athletes from 47 countries participated at the championships.

== Medal summary ==
=== Men ===
==== Canoe ====
===== Junior =====
Event	Gold	Points	Silver	Points	Bronze	Points
C1	Kacper Sztuba (POL)	97.12	Miquel Travé (ESP)	98.36	Lennard Tuchscherer (GER)	102.77
C1 team	Czech Republic; Vojtěch Heger; Matyáš Lhota; Jan Kaminský	124.52	Spain; Miquel Travé; David Burgos; Pau Echaniz	130.52	France; Theo Roisin; Alexis Bobon; Anthony Roux	139.42
C2 (non-medal event)	Vít Pohanka/Denis Wendl (CZE)	130.46	Jan Vrublovský/Petr Novotný (CZE)	168.89	Daniil Lipikhin/Igor Stafeev (RUS)	200.35

===== U23 =====
Event	Gold	Points	Silver	Points	Bronze	Points
C1	Marko Mirgorodský (SVK)	93.48	Václav Chaloupka (CZE)	94.45	Florian Breuer (GER)	95.49
C1 team	Czech Republic; Václav Chaloupka; Lukáš Rohan; Jan Větrovský	111.49	Great Britain; Samuel Ibbotson; Thomas Abbott; William Smith	113.81	France; Cédric Joly; Lucas Roisin; Erwan Marchais	114.54
C2	Matúš Gewissler/Juraj Skákala (SVK)	103.20	Nikolay Shkliaruk/Igor Mikhailov (RUS)	108.26	Vojtěch Heger/Tomáš Heger (CZE)	112.31
C2 team (non-medal event)	Russia; Nikolay Shkliaruk/Igor Mikhailov; Vadim Voinalovich/Aleksei Popov; Alexander Ovchinikov/Egor Gover	173.04	Czech Republic; Vojtěch Heger/Tomáš Heger; Vít Pohanka/Denis Wendl; Vojtěch Mrůzek/Albert Kašpar	195.32	-	

==== Kayak ====
===== Junior =====
Event	Gold	Points	Silver	Points	Bronze	Points
K1	Felix Oschmautz (AUT)	92.18	Tomáš Zima (CZE)	94.16	Jan Bárta (CZE)	95.67
K1 team	Germany; Lukas Stahl; Noah Hegge; Janosch Unseld	109.54	Spain; Pau Echaniz; Eneko Auzmendi; Miquel Travé	113.13	Czech Republic; Tomáš Zima; Josef Žížala; Jan Bárta	113.78

===== U23 =====
Event	Gold	Points	Silver	Points	Bronze	Points
K1	Jakub Grigar (SVK)	89.86	Mario Leitner (AUT)	91.81	Mathieu Desnos (FRA)	93.51
K1 team	Germany; Stefan Hengst; Samuel Hegge; Thomas Strauss	105.28	Slovenia; Žan Jakše; Martin Srabotnik; Vid Kuder Marušič	106.11	France; Mathurin Madoré; Pol Oulhen; Mathieu Desnos	108.42

=== Women ===
==== Canoe ====
===== Junior =====
Event	Gold	Points	Silver	Points	Bronze	Points
C1	Andrea Herzog (GER)	116.20	Soňa Stanovská (SVK)	117.49	Marta Bertoncelli (ITA)	126.60
C1 team	Germany; Andrea Herzog; Lena Holl; Zoe Jakob	228.51	Slovakia; Monika Škáchová; Simona Glejteková; Soňa Stanovská	234.12	Czech Republic; Eva Říhová; Gabriela Satková; Alexandra Vrbová	242.52

===== U23 =====
Event	Gold	Points	Silver	Points	Bronze	Points
C1	Mallory Franklin (GBR)	109.08	Tereza Fišerová (CZE)	112.25	Kimberley Woods (GBR)	113.95
C1 team	Great Britain; Mallory Franklin; Kimberley Woods; Eilidh Gibson	139.27	Spain; Klara Olazabal; Miren Lazkano; Annebel van der Knijff	152.17	Czech Republic; Tereza Fišerová; Martina Satková; Jana Matulková	155.08

==== Kayak ====
===== Junior =====
Event	Gold	Points	Silver	Points	Bronze	Points
K1	Antonie Galušková (CZE)	104.27	Eliška Mintálová (SVK)	105.15	Lucie Nesnídalová (CZE)	105.72
K1 team	Germany; Andrea Herzog; Lena Holl; Stella Mehlhorn	131.16	France; Romane Prigent; Anais Bernardy; Fanchon Janssen	137.48	Slovakia; Eliška Mintálová; Soňa Stanovská; Silvia Brosová	137.78

===== U23 =====
Event	Gold	Points	Silver	Points	Bronze	Points
K1	Jessica Fox (AUS)	101.21	Ana Sátila (BRA)	102.69	Klaudia Zwolińska (POL)	103.61
K1 team	Czech Republic; Karolína Galušková; Amálie Hilgertová; Barbora Valíková	125.88	Great Britain; Mallory Franklin; Kimberley Woods; Gabrielle Ridge	139.42	Australia; Jessica Fox; Noemie Fox; Kate Eckhardt	143.76

=== Mixed ===
==== Canoe ====
===== U23 =====
Event	Gold	Points	Silver	Points	Bronze	Points
C2	Alsu Minazova/Aleksei Popov (RUS)	126.46	Daria Shaidurova/Mikhail Kruglov (RUS)	132.51	Theo Roisin/Angèle Hug (FRA)	141.74

== Medal table ==
Rank	Nation	Gold	Silver	Bronze	Total
1	Germany (GER)	5	0	2	7
2	Czech Republic (CZE)	4	3	6	13
3	Slovakia (SVK)	3	3	1	7
4	Great Britain (GBR)	2	2	1	5
5	Russia (RUS)	1	2	0	3
6	Austria (AUT)	1	1	0	2
7	Australia (AUS)	1	0	1	2
7	Poland (POL)	1	0	1	2
9	Spain (ESP)	0	4	0	4
10	France (FRA)	0	1	5	6
11	Brazil (BRA)	0	1	0	1
11	Slovenia (SLO)	0	1	0	1
13	Italy (ITA)	0	0	1	1
Totals (13 entries)		18	18	18	54
