= Jacqueline Horn =

German canoeist

Medal record

Women's canoe slalom

Representing Germany

World Championships
Bronze medal – third place	2009 La Seu d'Urgell	K1 team

U23 European Championships
Gold medal – first place	2008 Solkan	K1 team
Gold medal – first place	2009 Liptovský Mikuláš	K1 team
Gold medal – first place	2010 Markkleeberg	K1
Silver medal – second place	2010 Markkleeberg	K1 team
Bronze medal – third place	2011 Banja Luka	K1 team

Junior World Championships
Gold medal – first place	2006 Solkan	K1 team
Silver medal – second place	2006 Solkan	K1

Jacqueline Horn (born 1988) is a German slalom canoeist who competed at the international level from 2006 to 2011.

She won a bronze medal in the K1 team event at the 2009 ICF Canoe Slalom World Championships in La Seu d'Urgell.

Her younger sister Stefanie represents Italy in canoe slalom.
