= Žan Jakše =

Slovenian canoeist

Personal information
- Born: 2 May 1996 (age 30)

Sport
- Club: KKK Tacen
- Coached by: Fedja Marušic
Medal record
Men's canoe slalom
Representing Slovenia
World Championships
Bronze medal – third place	2017 Pau	K1 team
U23 World Championships
Silver medal – second place	2017 Bratislava	K1 team
Silver medal – second place	2019 Kraków	K1 team
U23 European Championships
Gold medal – first place	2016 Solkan	K1 team
Silver medal – second place	2017 Hohenlimburg	K1 team
Bronze medal – third place	2017 Hohenlimburg	K1

Žan Jakše (born 2 May 1996) is a Slovenian slalom canoeist who has competed at the international level since 2015.

He won a bronze medal in the K1 team event at the 2017 ICF Canoe Slalom World Championships in Pau.

== World Cup individual podiums ==
Season	Date	Venue	Position	Event
2018	31 Aug 2018	Tacen	1st	K1
