= Zulfiia Sabitova =

Russian slalom canoeist

Personal information
- Nationality: Russian
- Born: 6 May 1993 (age 33)

Sport
- Country: Russia
- Sport: Canoe slalom
- Event: C1, Extreme K1
- Club: Tyumen Centre of Sports Preparation
Medal record
Women's canoe slalom
Representing RCF
World Championships
Bronze medal – third place	2021 Bratislava	C1 team
Representing Russia
U23 European Championships
Bronze medal – third place	2013 Bourg-Saint-Maurice	C1 team
Bronze medal – third place	2014 Skopje	C1 team

Zulfiia Sabitova (born 6 May 1993) is a Russian slalom canoeist who has competed at the international level since 2012.

She won a bronze medal in the C1 team event at the 2021 World Championships in Bratislava
