= Lukas Hoffmann (canoeist) =

German canoeist

Medal record

Men's canoe slalom

Representing Germany

World Championships
Silver medal – second place	2007 Foz do Iguaçu	C1 team

European Championships
Bronze medal – third place	2008 Kraków	C1 team

U23 European Championships
Gold medal – first place	2004 Kraków	C1 team
Silver medal – second place	2004 Kraków	C1
Silver medal – second place	2005 Kraków	C1 team
Silver medal – second place	2007 Kraków	C1 team
Bronze medal – third place	2006 Nottingham	C1 team

Junior World Championships
Silver medal – second place	2002 Nowy Sącz	C1 team
Bronze medal – third place	2002 Nowy Sącz	C1

Lukas Hoffmann (born 1984) is a German slalom canoeist who competed at the international level from 2002 to 2010.

He won a silver medal in the C1 team event at the 2007 ICF Canoe Slalom World Championships in Foz do Iguaçu and a bronze medal in the same event at the 2008 European Championships in Kraków.
