= 2015 European Junior and U23 Canoe Slalom Championships =

- Location: Kraków, Poland

The 2015 European Junior and U23 Canoe Slalom Championships took place at the Kraków-Kolna Canoe Slalom Course in Kraków, Poland from 26 to 30 August 2015 under the auspices of the European Canoe Association (ECA). It was the 17th edition of the competition for Juniors (U18) and the 13th edition for the Under 23 category.

== Medal summary ==
=== Men's results ===
==== Canoe ====
===== Junior =====
| Event | Gold | Points | Silver | Points | Bronze | Points |
|---|---|---|---|---|---|---|
| C1 | Marko Mirgorodský (SVK) | 87.04 | Sören Loos (GER) | 87.93 | Florian Breuer (GER) | 88.19 |
| C1 team | France; Lucas Roisin; Antoine Gaillard; Tom Maffeis | 104.28 | Poland; Kacper Sztuba; Przemysław Nowak; Dominik Janur | 104.55 | Germany; Florian Breuer; Sören Loos; Malte Horn | 104.76 |
| C2 | Germany; Niklas Hecht; Alexander Weber | 97.29 | Russia; Pavel Kotov; Sergei Komkov | 100.51 | Czech Republic; Jan Mrázek; Tomáš Rousek | 101.95 |
| C2 team | Germany; Niklas Hecht & Alexander Weber; Lennard Tuchscherer & Fritz Lehrach; Eric Borrmann & Leo Braune | 128.07 | Czech Republic; Jan Větrovský & Michael Matějka; Albert Kašpar & Vojtěch Mrůzek; Jan Mrázek & Tomáš Rousek | 132.25 | Russia; Pavel Kotov & Sergei Komkov; Danil Boyarkin & Dmitrii Khramtsov; Anton Sirotkin & Aleksandr Buinov | 135.03 |

===== U23 =====
| Event | Gold | Points | Silver | Points | Bronze | Points |
|---|---|---|---|---|---|---|
| C1 | Kirill Setkin (RUS) | 81.91 | Thibault Blaise (FRA) | 83.62 | Kilian Foulon (FRA) | 86.67 |
| C1 team | Russia; Kirill Setkin; Alexander Nepogodin; Alexander Ovchinikov | 97.25 | Italy; Raffaello Ivaldi; Roberto Colazingari; Paolo Ceccon | 97.27 | France; Kilian Foulon; Cédric Joly; Thibault Blaise | 97.75 |
| C2 | Poland; Michał Wiercioch; Grzegorz Majerczak | 90.87 | Poland; Filip Brzeziński; Andrzej Brzeziński | 91.35 | Russia; Aleksei Popov; Vadim Voinalovich | 91.68 |
| C2 team | Poland; Filip Brzeziński & Andrzej Brzeziński; Michał Wiercioch & Grzegorz Majerczak; Adam Kozub & Igor Sztuba | 113.01 | Germany; Milton Witkowski & Paul Sommer; Aaron Jüttner & Piet Lennart Wagner; Florian Beste & Sören Loos | 113.14 | Russia; Aleksei Popov & Vadim Voinalovich; Nikolay Shkliaruk & Igor Mikhailov; Egor Gover & Dmitriy Azanov | 118.81 |

==== Kayak ====
===== Junior =====
| Event | Gold | Points | Silver | Points | Bronze | Points |
|---|---|---|---|---|---|---|
| K1 | Niko Testen (SLO) | 82.04 | Richard Macúš (SVK) | 82.21 | Alexandr Maikranz (CZE) | 82.71 |
| K1 team | Slovakia; Jakub Grigar; Richard Macúš; Samuel Stanovský | 95.32 | Poland; Jakub Brzeziński; Wiktor Sandera; Krzysztof Majerczak | 95.76 | Great Britain; Zachary Allin; James Cooper; Christopher Bowers | 96.11 |

===== U23 =====
| Event | Gold | Points | Silver | Points | Bronze | Points |
|---|---|---|---|---|---|---|
| K1 | Jiří Prskavec (CZE) | 77.09 | Zeno Ivaldi (ITA) | 79.67 | David Llorente (ESP) | 80.14 |
| K1 team | France; Quentin Burgi; Bastien Damiens; Tom Scianimanico | 90.10 | Germany; Laurenz Laugwitz; Fabian Schweikert; Stefan Hengst | 91.90 | Italy; Giovanni De Gennaro; Zeno Ivaldi; Marcello Beda | 93.13 |

=== Women's results ===
==== Canoe ====
===== Junior =====
| Event | Gold | Points | Silver | Points | Bronze | Points |
|---|---|---|---|---|---|---|
| C1 | Nadine Weratschnig (AUT) | 97.90 | Miren Lazkano (ESP) | 102.08 | Lucie Prioux (FRA) | 102.17 |
| C1 team | Czech Republic; Martina Satková; Eva Říhová; Tereza Fišerová | 129.37 | France; Lucie Prioux; Anne-Lise Moisan-Ehrwein; Azénor Philip | 138.42 | Slovakia; Soňa Stanovská; Simona Glejteková; Monika Škáchová | 139.90 |

===== U23 =====
| Event | Gold | Points | Silver | Points | Bronze | Points |
|---|---|---|---|---|---|---|
| C1 | Monika Jančová (CZE) | 97.88 | Núria Vilarrubla (ESP) | 98.40 | Jana Matulková (CZE) | 99.28 |
| C1 team | Great Britain; Mallory Franklin; Jasmine Royle; Eilidh Gibson | 118.49 | Spain; Núria Vilarrubla; Miren Lazkano; Annebel van der Knijff | 126.55 | Czech Republic; Jana Matulková; Monika Jančová; Anna Koblencová | 130.45 |

==== Kayak ====
===== Junior =====
| Event | Gold | Points | Silver | Points | Bronze | Points |
|---|---|---|---|---|---|---|
| K1 | Klaudia Zwolińska (POL) | 90.79 | Nina Weratschnig (AUT) | 96.24 | Michaela Haššová (SVK) | 97.09 |
| K1 team | Slovakia; Michaela Haššová; Simona Maceková; Lucia Murzová | 107.38 | Czech Republic; Tereza Fišerová; Amálie Hilgertová; Martina Satková | 112.11 | Spain; Miren Lazkano; Irene Egües; Klara Olazabal | 113.31 |

===== U23 =====
| Event | Gold | Points | Silver | Points | Bronze | Points |
|---|---|---|---|---|---|---|
| K1 | Núria Vilarrubla (ESP) | 92.68 | Viktoria Wolffhardt (AUT) | 93.85 | Viktoriia Us (UKR) | 94.77 |
| K1 team | Czech Republic; Barbora Valíková; Pavlína Zástěrová; Kateřina Dušková | 107.65 | Great Britain; Amy Hollick; Mallory Franklin; Bethan Latham | 112.26 | Austria; Viktoria Wolffhardt; Nina Weratschnig; Valentina Dreier | 113.90 |

== Medals Table ==
| Rank | Nation | Gold | Silver | Bronze | Total |
|---|---|---|---|---|---|
| 1 | Czech Republic (CZE) | 4 | 2 | 4 | 10 |
| 2 | Poland (POL) | 3 | 3 | 0 | 6 |
| 3 | Slovakia (SVK) | 3 | 1 | 2 | 6 |
| 4 | Germany (GER) | 2 | 3 | 2 | 7 |
| 5 | France (FRA) | 2 | 2 | 3 | 7 |
| 6 | Russia (RUS) | 2 | 1 | 3 | 6 |
| 7 | Spain (ESP) | 1 | 3 | 2 | 6 |
| 8 | Austria (AUT) | 1 | 2 | 1 | 4 |
| 9 | Great Britain (GBR) | 1 | 1 | 1 | 3 |
| 10 | Slovenia (SLO) | 1 | 0 | 0 | 1 |
| 11 | Italy (ITA) | 0 | 2 | 1 | 3 |
| 12 | Ukraine (UKR) | 0 | 0 | 1 | 1 |
| Totals (12 entries) | | 20 | 20 | 20 | 60 |
