= 2011 European Junior and U23 Canoe Slalom Championships =

- Location: Banja Luka, Bosnia and Herzegovina

The 2011 European Junior and U23 Canoe Slalom Championships took place in Banja Luka, Bosnia and Herzegovina from 14 to 17 July 2011 under the auspices of the European Canoe Association (ECA). It was the 13th edition of the competition for Juniors (U18) and the 9th edition for the Under 23 category. A total of 18 medal events took place. No medals were awarded for the junior women's C1 team event due to low number of participating countries. The U23 women's C1 team event did not take place.

== Medal summary ==
=== Men ===
==== Canoe ====
===== Junior =====
Event	Gold		Silver		Bronze	
C1	Roberto Colazingari (ITA)	104.64	Kirill Setkin (RUS)	106.78	Igor Sztuba (POL)	108.02
C1 team	France; Maxime Perron; Antoine Runet; Jean Freri	130.88	Czech Republic; Jakub Mrůzek; Marek Cepek; Jakub Hojda	133.96	Russia; Alexander Ovchinikov; Vsevolod Dolgih; Kirill Setkin	155.79
C2	Filip Brzeziński/Andrzej Brzeziński (POL)	120.57	Yves Prigent/Loïc Kervella (FRA)	125.73	Radek Pospíchal/Marek Cepek (CZE)	126.27
C2 team	Poland; Filip Brzeziński/Andrzej Brzeziński; Michał Wiercioch/Grzegorz Majerczak; Michał Madzio/Adrian Wlazło	126.70	Great Britain; Matthew Evans/Matthew Holliday; Jonathan Shaw/Liam Allwood; Barry Kell/Ryan Westley	141.11	Russia; Egor Gover/Dmitriy Azanov; Roman Stepanov/Ilia Shaydurov; Pavel Kovalkov/Artem Bogdanov	142.25

===== U23 =====
Event	Gold		Silver		Bronze	
C1	Anže Berčič (SLO)	101.03	Matija Marinić (CRO)	102.47	Alexander Funk (GER)	104.34
C1 team	Czech Republic; Jan Busta; Tomáš Rak; Martin Říha	114.10	Great Britain; Mark Proctor; Thomas Quinn; Adam Burgess	116.64	Germany; Franz Anton; Alexander Funk; Florian Mannheim	116.74
C2	Luka Božič/Sašo Taljat (SLO)	109.23	Ondřej Karlovský/Jakub Jáně (CZE)	111.85	Robert Behling/Thomas Becker (GER)	111.87
C2 team	Czech Republic; Jonáš Kašpar/Marek Šindler; Ondřej Karlovský/Jakub Jáně; Robert Gotvald/Jan Vlček	126.00	Germany; Mathias Westphal/Paul Jork; Robert Behling/Thomas Becker; Eric Mendel/Otto-Max Klein	128.90	Great Britain; Thomas Quinn/George Tatchell; Rhys Davies/Matthew Lister; Adam Burgess/Greg Pitt	129.15

==== Kayak ====
===== Junior =====
Event	Gold		Silver		Bronze	
K1	Simon Brus (SLO)	96.73	Jiří Prskavec (CZE)	101.10	Andrej Málek (SVK)	104.00
K1 team	Slovenia; Martin Srabotnik; Matic Štrukelj; Simon Brus	107.01	Poland; Maciej Okręglak; Bartosz Dębowski; Eryk Lejmel	110.41	Germany; Stefan Hengst; Johannes Dinkelaker; Samuel Hegge	110.89

===== U23 =====
Event	Gold		Silver		Bronze	
K1	Mateusz Polaczyk (POL)	92.93	Benjamin Renia (FRA)	94.80	Nils Winkler (GER)	94.90
K1 team	Czech Republic; Vít Přindiš; Jan Vondra; Ondřej Tunka	108.98	Russia; Pavel Eigel; Evgeniy Doronin; Denis Korpachev	111.91	Italy; Lukas Mayr; Omar Raiba; Giovanni De Gennaro	112.06

=== Women ===
==== Canoe ====
===== Junior =====
Event	Gold		Silver		Bronze	
C1	Viktoria Wolffhardt (AUT)	131.10	Jasmine Royle (GBR)	133.89	Karolin Wagner (GER)	145.62
C1 team (non-medal event)	Great Britain; Kimberley Woods; Mallory Franklin; Jasmine Royle	208.01	Czech Republic; Jana Matulková; Petra Fryšová; Denisa Foltysová	213.29	Germany; Tammy Behrendt; Karolin Wagner; Julia Neitz	239.83

===== U23 =====
Event	Gold		Silver		Bronze	
C1	Oriane Rebours (FRA)	134.40	Núria Vilarrubla (ESP)	137.94	Alice Spencer (GBR)	139.03

==== Kayak ====
===== Junior =====
Event	Gold		Silver		Bronze	
K1	Lisa Fritsche (GER)	111.15	Pavlína Zástěrová (CZE)	112.14	Caroline Trompeter (GER)	114.02
K1 team	Germany; Lisa Fritsche; Caroline Trompeter; Jessica Decker	124.30	France; Lucie Baudu; Clémentine Geoffray; Estelle Hellard	129.31	Great Britain; Kimberley Woods; Mallory Franklin; Bethan Latham	130.59

===== U23 =====
Event	Gold		Silver		Bronze	
K1	Eva Terčelj (SLO)	107.63	Maria Clara Giai Pron (ITA)	107.91	Ricarda Funk (GER)	108.58
K1 team	Czech Republic; Kateřina Kudějová; Veronika Vojtová; Eva Ornstová	125.58	Austria; Viktoria Wolffhardt; Lisa Leitner; Julia Schmid	127.45	Germany; Jacqueline Horn; Stefanie Horn; Ricarda Funk	128.15

== Medal table ==
Rank	Nation	Gold	Silver	Bronze	Total
1	Slovenia (SLO)	5	0	0	5
2	Czech Republic (CZE)	4	4	1	9
3	Poland (POL)	3	1	1	5
4	France (FRA)	2	3	0	5
5	Germany (GER)	2	1	9	12
6	Italy (ITA)	1	1	1	3
7	Austria (AUT)	1	1	0	2
8	Great Britain (GBR)	0	3	3	6
9	Russia (RUS)	0	2	2	4
10	Croatia (CRO)	0	1	0	1
10	Spain (ESP)	0	1	0	1
12	Slovakia (SVK)	0	0	1	1
Totals (12 entries)		18	18	18	54
