= Karolin Wagner =

German slalom canoeist

Medal record

Women's canoe slalom

Representing Germany

World Championships
Bronze medal – third place	2013 Prague	C1 team

U23 World Championships
Silver medal – second place	2012 Wausau	C1 team

U23 European Championships
Silver medal – second place	2012 Solkan	C1 team
Silver medal – second place	2013 Bourg-Saint-Maurice	C1 team

Junior World Championships
Gold medal – first place	2013 Liptovský Mikuláš	C1
Silver medal – second place	2013 Liptovský Mikuláš	C1 team

Junior European Championships
Silver medal – second place	2014 Skopje	C1 team
Bronze medal – third place	2011 Banja Luka	C1
Bronze medal – third place	2014 Skopje	C1

Karolin Wagner (born 1 April 1996) is a German slalom canoeist who competed at the international level from 2011 to 2015.

She qualified for the German Junior Canoe Slalom team at the age of 15 in the category Canoe Single. In the same year, she debuted at her first international competition with a bronze medal at the ECA Junior European Championships in Banja Luka in the C1 single event. In 2013, she won the C1 single competition at the ICF Junior World Championships in Liptovský Mikuláš. In the same year, she won a bronze medal in the C1 team event at the 2013 ICF Canoe Slalom World Championships in Prague.

Outside her main competition category C1, she also successfully competed in team competitions and in the category K1 at several German Youth, Junior and Senior competitions. Notably, she won a gold medal at the 2013 German Junior Championships in K1 in Markkleeberg.

She took part in awareness campaigns for women's participation in C1 competitions and gender equality in Canoe Slalom.
