= Annebel van der Knijff =

Spanish canoeist

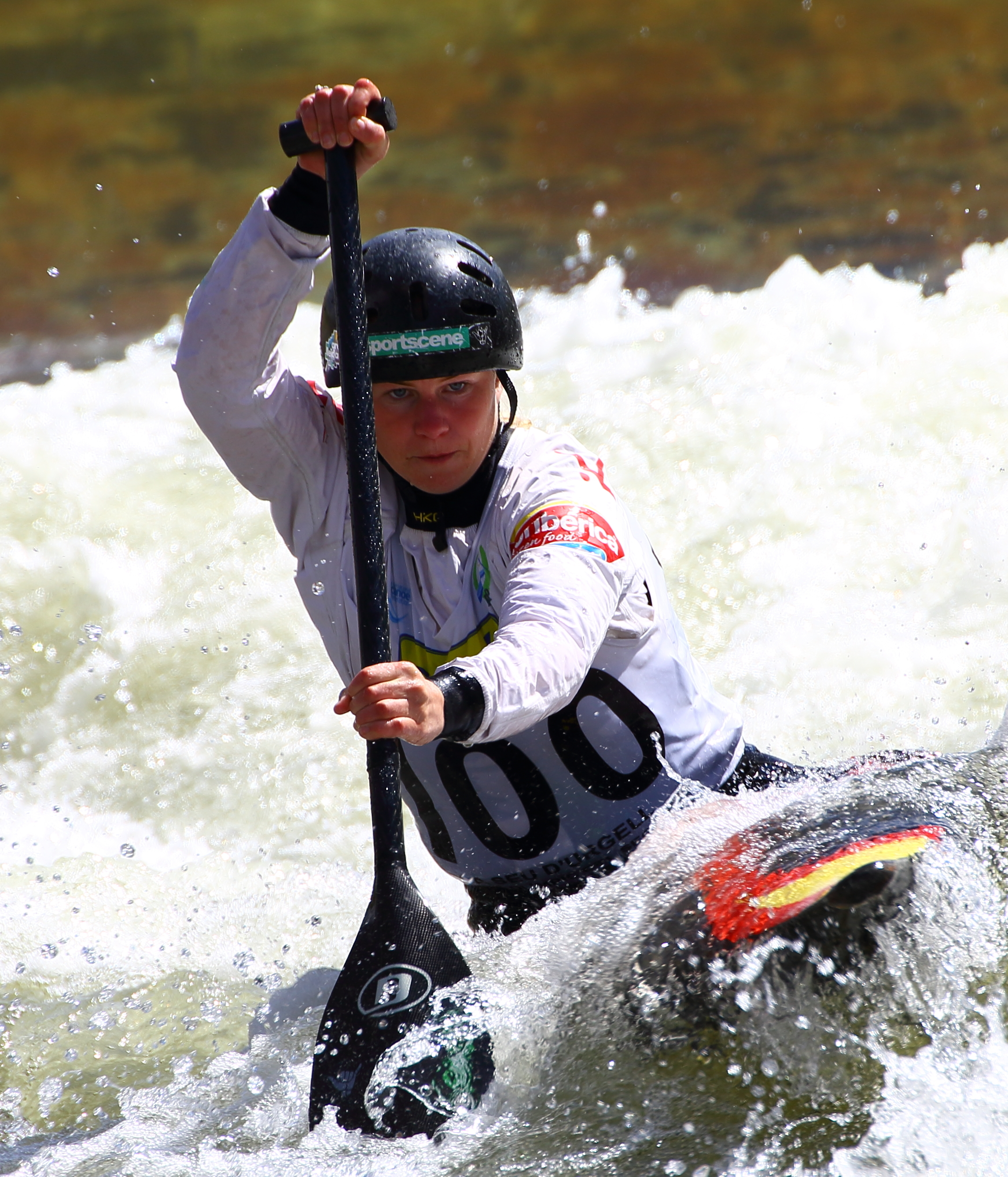
- Knijff in Seu d'Urgell in 2017

Medal record

Women's canoe slalom

Representing Spain

European Championships
Gold medal – first place	2015 Markkleeberg	C1 team

U23 World Championships
Gold medal – first place	2015 Foz do Iguaçu	C1 team
Gold medal – first place	2018 Ivrea	C1 team
Silver medal – second place	2013 Liptovský Mikuláš	C1 team
Silver medal – second place	2017 Bratislava	C1 team

U23 European Championships
Gold medal – first place	2012 Solkan	C1 team
Gold medal – first place	2018 Bratislava	C1 team
Silver medal – second place	2015 Kraków	C1 team
Silver medal – second place	2016 Solkan	C1 team

Junior European Championships
Gold medal – first place	2013 Bourg-Saint-Maurice	K1 team
Gold medal – first place	2014 Skopje	C1 team

Annebel van der Knijff (born 5 March 1996 in Wassenaar, Netherlands) is a Spanish slalom canoeist who has competed at the international level since 2012 in both C1 and K1. She has also competed in mixed C2.

== Career ==
Annebel won a gold medal in the C1 team event at the 2015 European Championships in Markkleeberg. She won a gold medal in the C1 team event at the U23 European Championships in 2012, her first international competition at age 16. At the 2013 U23 World Championships in Liptovský Mikuláš she won a silver medal in C1 team event. At the 2013 Junior European Championships in Bourg-Saint-Maurice she won a gold medal in the K1 team event.

== Personal life ==
Both her parents were world cup windsurfers. Her mother was overall Dutch champion windsurfer in 1996.

She moved from the Netherlands to Andorra at age 3, then to Spain, living next to the 1992 Olympic wild water course. She has been paddling since 8 years old and won most National Spanish Championships of her category since then. She has been a part of the Spanish senior team in C1 since 2013 and the Spanish junior and U23 team in C1 and K1 since 2012.
