= 2006 European Junior and U23 Canoe Slalom Championships =

- Location: Nottingham, United Kingdom

The 2006 European Junior and U23 Canoe Slalom Championships took place in Nottingham, United Kingdom from 24 to 27 August 2006 under the auspices of the European Canoe Association (ECA) at the Holme Pierrepont National Watersports Centre. It was the 8th edition of the competition for Juniors (U18) and the 4th edition for the Under 23 category. A total of 15 medal events took place. No medals were awarded for the U23 men's C2 team event due to low number of participating countries.

== Medal summary ==
=== Men ===
==== Canoe ====
===== Junior =====
Event	Gold		Silver		Bronze	
C1	Grzegorz Hedwig (POL)	199.79	Dawid Bartos (POL)	200.35	Mark Proctor (GBR)	203.21
C1 team	Poland; Grzegorz Hedwig; Piotr Szczepański; Dawid Bartos	218.37	France; Sébastien Cardiet; Thibaud Vielliard; Norbert Neveu	242.28	Slovakia; Matej Skubík; Juraj Ontko; Lukáš Gajarský	242.38
C2	Robert Gotvald/Jan Vlček (CZE)	221.79	Hugo Biso/Pierre Picco (FRA)	226.42	Yoan Del Rey/Arthur Grandemange (FRA)	226.65
C2 team	Slovenia; Luka Božič/Sašo Taljat; Blaž Oven/Luka Slapšak; Jure Janežič/Anže Janežič	265.60	Poland; Dawid Dobrowolski/Dominik Węglarz; Marcin Kasprzak/Karol Kasprzak; Michał Salamon/Grzegorz Kwiatek	267.24	France; Hugo Biso/Pierre Picco; Yoan Del Rey/Arthur Grandemange; Jeff Mouroux/Cyril Barbier	278.41

===== U23 =====
Event	Gold		Silver		Bronze	
C1	Alexander Slafkovský (SVK)	192.08	Nicolas Peschier (FRA)	193.43	Christos Tsakmakis (GRE)	195.40
C1 team	Poland; Adam Czaja; Grzegorz Kiljanek; Krzysztof Supowicz	213.17	Slovenia; Jošt Zakrajšek; Benjamin Savšek; Marko Čivčija	215.81	Germany; Lukas Hoffmann; Vitali Zirka; Timo Wirsching	217.25
C2	Tomáš Kučera/Ján Bátik (SVK)	201.01	Mathieu Voyemant/Damien Troquenet (FRA)	204.38	Ladislav Vlček/Martin Hammer (CZE)	208.78
C2 team (non-medal event)	France; Mathieu Fougere/Thomas Fougere; Gauthier Klauss/Matthieu Péché; Mathieu Voyemant/Damien Troquenet	235.19	Germany; Daniel Junker/Martin Krenzer; Michael Bartsch/Michael Wiedemann; Felix Michel/Sebastian Piersig	241.47	Czech Republic; Jan Zdráhal/Petr Zdráhal; Tomáš Koplík/Jakub Vrzáň; Ladislav Vlček/Martin Hammer	248.81

==== Kayak ====
===== Junior =====
Event	Gold		Silver		Bronze	
K1	Jan Vondra (CZE)	186.27	Lucien Delfour (FRA)	189.51	Mateusz Polaczyk (POL)	192.10
K1 team	Poland; Łukasz Polaczyk; Jakub Chojnowski; Mateusz Polaczyk	214.30	Czech Republic; Vít Přindiš; Tomáš Maslaňák; Jan Vondra	216.11	Germany; Stefan Menke; Sebastian Hitz; Sven Brabender	222.66

===== U23 =====
Event	Gold		Silver		Bronze	
K1	Peter Kauzer (SLO)	179.52	Dariusz Popiela (POL)	180.16	Daniele Molmenti (ITA)	180.33
K1 team	Poland; Henryk Polaczyk; Grzegorz Polaczyk; Dariusz Popiela	199.90	Germany; Jürgen Kraus; Robert Süssenbach; Jens Ewald	200.78	Italy; Andrea Romeo; Enrico Gheno; Daniele Molmenti	206.36

=== Women ===
==== Kayak ====
===== Junior =====
Event	Gold		Silver		Bronze	
K1	Kateřina Kudějová (CZE)	216.21	Šárka Blažková (CZE)	218.41	Urša Kragelj (SLO)	218.76
K1 team	Germany; Stefanie Horn; Maren Alberti; Cindy Pöschel	242.72	Czech Republic; Šárka Blažková; Kateřina Kudějová; Anna Dandová	252.29	France; Laura Lyphout; Claire Jacquet; Laura Mangin	254.81

===== U23 =====
Event	Gold		Silver		Bronze	
K1	Jana Dukátová (SVK)	197.73	Melanie Pfeifer (GER)	204.00	Dorothée Utz (GER)	209.08
K1 team	Germany; Dorothée Utz; Mira Louen; Melanie Pfeifer	231.01	Great Britain; Claire Harrower; Louise Donington; Lizzie Neave	243.15	France; Carole Bouzidi; Marie-Zélia Lafont; Émilie Fer	244.43

== Medal table ==
Rank	Nation	Gold	Silver	Bronze	Total
1	Poland (POL)	5	3	1	9
2	Czech Republic (CZE)	3	3	1	7
3	Slovakia (SVK)	3	0	1	4
4	Germany (GER)	2	2	3	7
5	Slovenia (SLO)	2	1	1	4
6	France (FRA)	0	5	4	9
7	Great Britain (GBR)	0	1	1	2
8	Italy (ITA)	0	0	2	2
9	Greece (GRE)	0	0	1	1
Totals (9 entries)		15	15	15	45
