= Miren Lazkano =

Spanish slalom canoeist

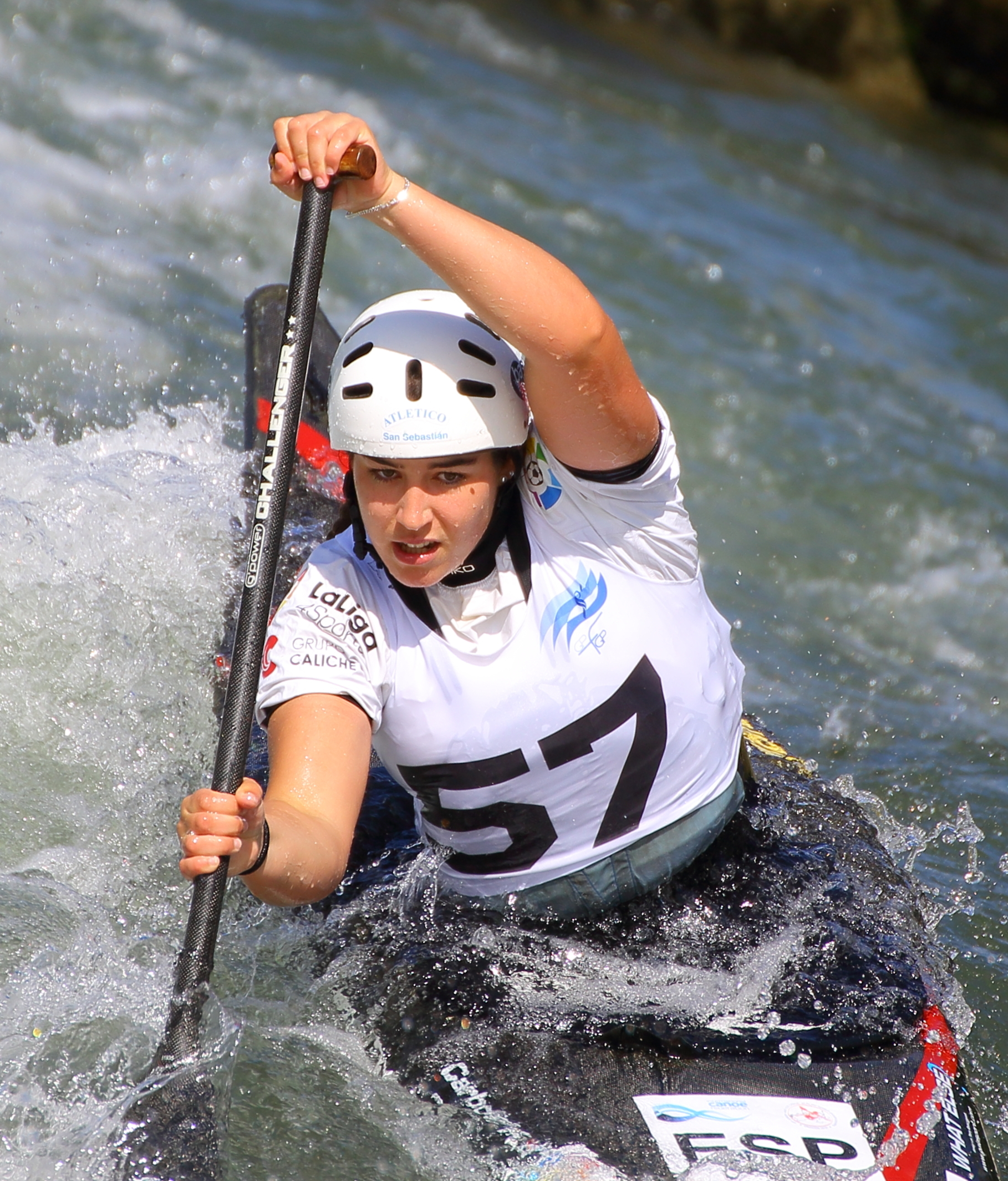
- Lazkano in 2017

Personal information
- Full name: Miren Lazkano Zuriarrain
- Born: 16 June 1997 (age 29) San Sebastián, Spain
- Height: 1.69 m (5 ft 7 in)
- Weight: 72 kg (159 lb)

Sport
- Country: Spain
- Sport: Canoe slalom
- Events: C1, K1, Kayak cross, C2 mixed
- Club: Club Atlético San Sebastián
Medal record
Women's canoe slalom
Representing Spain
World Championships
Silver medal – second place	2021 Bratislava	C1 team
Bronze medal – third place	2026 Oklahoma City	Kayak cross
European Championships
Gold medal – first place	2021 Ivrea	C1
Bronze medal – third place	2018 Prague	C1 team
U23 World Championships
Gold medal – first place	2018 Ivrea	C2 mixed
Gold medal – first place	2018 Ivrea	C1 team
Silver medal – second place	2013 Liptovský Mikuláš	C1 team
Silver medal – second place	2017 Bratislava	C1 team
U23 European Championships
Gold medal – first place	2012 Solkan	C1 team
Gold medal – first place	2017 Hohenlimburg	C1
Gold medal – first place	2018 Bratislava	C1 team
Silver medal – second place	2015 Kraków	C1 team
Silver medal – second place	2016 Solkan	C1 team
Junior World Championships
Silver medal – second place	2014 Penrith	K1 team
Junior European Championships
Gold medal – first place	2013 Bourg-Saint-Maurice	K1 team
Gold medal – first place	2014 Skopje	C1 team
Silver medal – second place	2015 Kraków	C1
Bronze medal – third place	2014 Skopje	K1 team
Bronze medal – third place	2015 Kraków	K1 team

Miren Lazkano Zuriarrain (Note: In this Spanish name, the first or paternal surname is Lazkano and the second or maternal family name is Zuriarrain.) (born 16 June 1997) is a Spanish slalom canoeist who has competed at the international level since 2012.

She won two medals at the ICF Canoe Slalom World Championships with a silver in the C1 team event in 2021 and a bronze in kayak cross in 2026.

She also became the European Champion in the C1 event in 2021 and won a bronze medal in the C1 team event in 2018.

Lazkano competed at the 2024 Summer Olympics in Paris, finishing 10th in the C1 event and 17th in kayak cross.

Lazkano finished 7th in the 2021 World Cup overall standings, making the final at the last two rounds.

== World Cup individual podiums ==
Season	Date	Venue	Position	Event
2016	11 June 2016	La Seu d'Urgell	2nd	C1
2025	7 June 2025	La Seu d'Urgell	2nd	C1
2025	8 June 2025	La Seu d'Urgell	1st	Kayak cross individual
2025	15 June 2025	Pau	1st	Kayak cross
2026	12 September 2026	La Seu d'Urgell	2nd	C1
