= 2017 European Junior and U23 Canoe Slalom Championships =

- Location: Hohenlimburg, Germany

The 2017 European Junior and U23 Canoe Slalom Championships took place in Hohenlimburg, Germany from 17 to 20 August 2017 under the auspices of the European Canoe Association (ECA). It was the 19th edition of the competition for Juniors (U18) and the 15th edition for the Under 23 category. The men's C2 team events did not take place. The men's C2 junior event did not count as a medal event due to insufficient number of participating countries. An event must have at least 5 nations taking part in order to count as a medal event.

== Medal summary ==
=== Men ===
==== Canoe ====
===== Junior =====
Event	Gold	Points	Silver	Points	Bronze	Points
C1	Vojtěch Heger (CZE)	106.95	Matyáš Lhota (CZE)	108.31	Lennard Tuchscherer (GER)	111.36
C1 team	Czech Republic; Vojtěch Heger; Matyáš Lhota; Jan Kaminský	120.99	Spain; Miquel Travé; Eneko Auzmendi; Pau Echaniz	124.13	Poland; Kacper Sztuba; Szymon Zawadzki; Michał Franczak	128.38
C2 (non-medal event)	Jan Vrublovský/Petr Novotný (CZE)	130.92	Nikolaos-Emmanouil Pantazis/Panagiotis Arvanitis (GRE)	149.08	Daniil Lipikhin/Igor Stafeev (RUS)	166.48

===== U23 =====
Event	Gold	Points	Silver	Points	Bronze	Points
C1	Marko Mirgorodský (SVK)	104.28	Cédric Joly (FRA)	105.04	Lukáš Rohan (CZE)	105.12
C1 team	France; Lucas Roisin; Erwan Marchais; Cédric Joly	114.01	Germany; Timo Trummer; Florian Breuer; Leon Hanika	116.18	Czech Republic; Václav Chaloupka; Lukáš Rohan; Jan Větrovský	117.28
C2	Vojtěch Mrůzek/Albert Kašpar (CZE)	122.47	Juraj Skákala/Matúš Gewissler (SVK)	122.95	Pavel Kotov/Sergei Komkov (RUS)	125.43

==== Kayak ====
===== Junior =====
Event	Gold	Points	Silver	Points	Bronze	Points
K1	Tine Kancler (SLO)	99.71	Adam Gonšenica (SVK)	100.40	Simon Hene (FRA)	102.17
K1 team	Czech Republic; Tomáš Zima; Josef Žížala; Jan Bárta	117.18	Italy; Valentin Luther; Tommaso Fasoli; Davide Ghisetti	117.40	Germany; Lukas Stahl; Noah Hegge; Janosch Unseld	119.51

===== U23 =====
Event	Gold	Points	Silver	Points	Bronze	Points
K1	Mario Leitner (AUT)	96.77	Jakob Weger (ITA)	97.54	Žan Jakše (SLO)	97.73
K1 team	France; Mathieu Desnos; Pol Oulhen; Mathurin Madoré	111.75	Slovenia; Martin Srabotnik; Žan Jakše; Vid Kuder Marušič	112.71	Austria; Mario Leitner; Felix Oschmautz; Matthias Weger	114.17

=== Women ===
==== Canoe ====
===== Junior =====
Event	Gold	Points	Silver	Points	Bronze	Points
C1	Monica Doria Vilarrubla (AND)	120.11	Zoe Jakob (GER)	121.24	Gabriela Satková (CZE)	122.79
C1 team	Slovakia; Simona Glejteková; Soňa Stanovská; Monika Škáchová	138.58	Germany; Nele Bayn; Lena Holl; Zoe Jakob	138.65	Russia; Daria Kuznetsova; Elizaveta Terekhova; Daria Shaidurova	143.65

===== U23 =====
Event	Gold	Points	Silver	Points	Bronze	Points
C1	Miren Lazkano (ESP)	119.05	Viktoria Wolffhardt (AUT)	121.29	Nadine Weratschnig (AUT)	122.41
C1 team	Czech Republic; Tereza Fišerová; Martina Satková; Jana Matulková	137.35	Slovenia; Alja Kozorog; Nina Bizjak; Lea Novak	144.44	Slovakia; Simona Maceková; Monika Škáchová; Eva Diešková	145.78

==== Kayak ====
===== Junior =====
Event	Gold	Points	Silver	Points	Bronze	Points
K1	Laia Sorribes (ESP)	110.28	Antonie Galušková (CZE)	113.54	Romane Prigent (FRA)	114.28
K1 team	Czech Republic; Lucie Nesnídalová; Antonie Galušková; Kateřina Beková	127.90	France; Romane Prigent; Fanchon Janssen; Anais Bernardy	134.57	Russia; Daria Kuznetsova; Elizaveta Terekhova; Daria Shaidurova	135.07

===== U23 =====
Event	Gold	Points	Silver	Points	Bronze	Points
K1	Viktoria Wolffhardt (AUT)	110.90	Karolína Galušková (CZE)	111.31	Camille Prigent (FRA)	111.96
K1 team	Netherlands; Lena Teunissen; Claudia Leenders; Maartje Otten	130.55	Germany; Caroline Trompeter; Selina Jones; Eva Pohlen	130.81	Poland; Klaudia Zwolińska; Sara Ćwik; Edyta Rosiek	131.02

== Medal table ==
Rank	Nation	Gold	Silver	Bronze	Total
1	Czech Republic (CZE)	6	3	3	12
2	France (FRA)	2	2	3	7
3	Slovakia (SVK)	2	2	1	5
4	Austria (AUT)	2	1	2	5
5	Spain (ESP)	2	1	0	3
6	Slovenia (SLO)	1	2	1	4
7	Andorra (AND)	1	0	0	1
7	Netherlands (NED)	1	0	0	1
9	Germany (GER)	0	4	2	6
10	Italy (ITA)	0	2	0	2
11	Russia (RUS)	0	0	3	3
12	Poland (POL)	0	0	2	2
Totals (12 entries)		17	17	17	51
