= Krzysztof Majerczak =

Polish canoeist

Personal information
- Nationality: Polish
- Born: 1 February 1997 (age 29)

Sport
- Country: Poland
- Sport: Canoe slalom
- Event: K1
Medal record
Men's canoe slalom
Representing Poland
World Championships
Bronze medal – third place	2019 La Seu d'Urgell	K1 team
U23 European Championships
Silver medal – second place	2020 Kraków	K1
Bronze medal – third place	2020 Kraków	K1 team
Junior European Championships
Silver medal – second place	2015 Kraków	K1 team
Bronze medal – third place	2014 Skopje	K1 team

Krzysztof Majerczak (1 February 1997) is a Polish slalom canoeist who has competed at the international level since 2014.

He won a bronze medal in the K1 team event at the 2019 ICF Canoe Slalom World Championships in La Seu d'Urgell. Krzysztof represented Poland in the K1 event at the delayed 2020 Summer Olympics in Tokyo, where he finished 15th after being eliminated in the semifinal.
