= Damien Troquenet =

French slalom canoeist

Medal record

Men's canoe slalom

Representing France

World Championships
Silver medal – second place	2007 Foz do Iguaçu	C2 team

European Championships
Silver medal – second place	2009 Nottingham	C2

U23 European Championships
Silver medal – second place	2004 Kraków	C2 team
Silver medal – second place	2005 Kraków	C2
Silver medal – second place	2006 Nottingham	C2

Pacific Mini Games
Silver medal – second place	2022 Saipan	Half marathon

Damien Troquenet is a French slalom canoeist who competed at the international level from 2003 to 2009.

Troquenet was born in Paris.

He won a silver medal in the C2 team event at the 2007 ICF Canoe Slalom World Championships in Foz do Iguaçu. He also won a silver medal in the C2 event at the 2009 European Championships in Nottingham. His partner in the C2 boat was Mathieu Voyemant.

In 2016, he moved to Tahiti and started racing Va'a. He subsequently won the Waterman Tahiti Tour in 2018 and 2019.

He represented French Polynesia in the half-marathon at the 2022 Pacific Mini Games in Saipan, Northern Mariana Islands, winning a silver medal.
