= Vojtěch Heger =

Czech canoeist

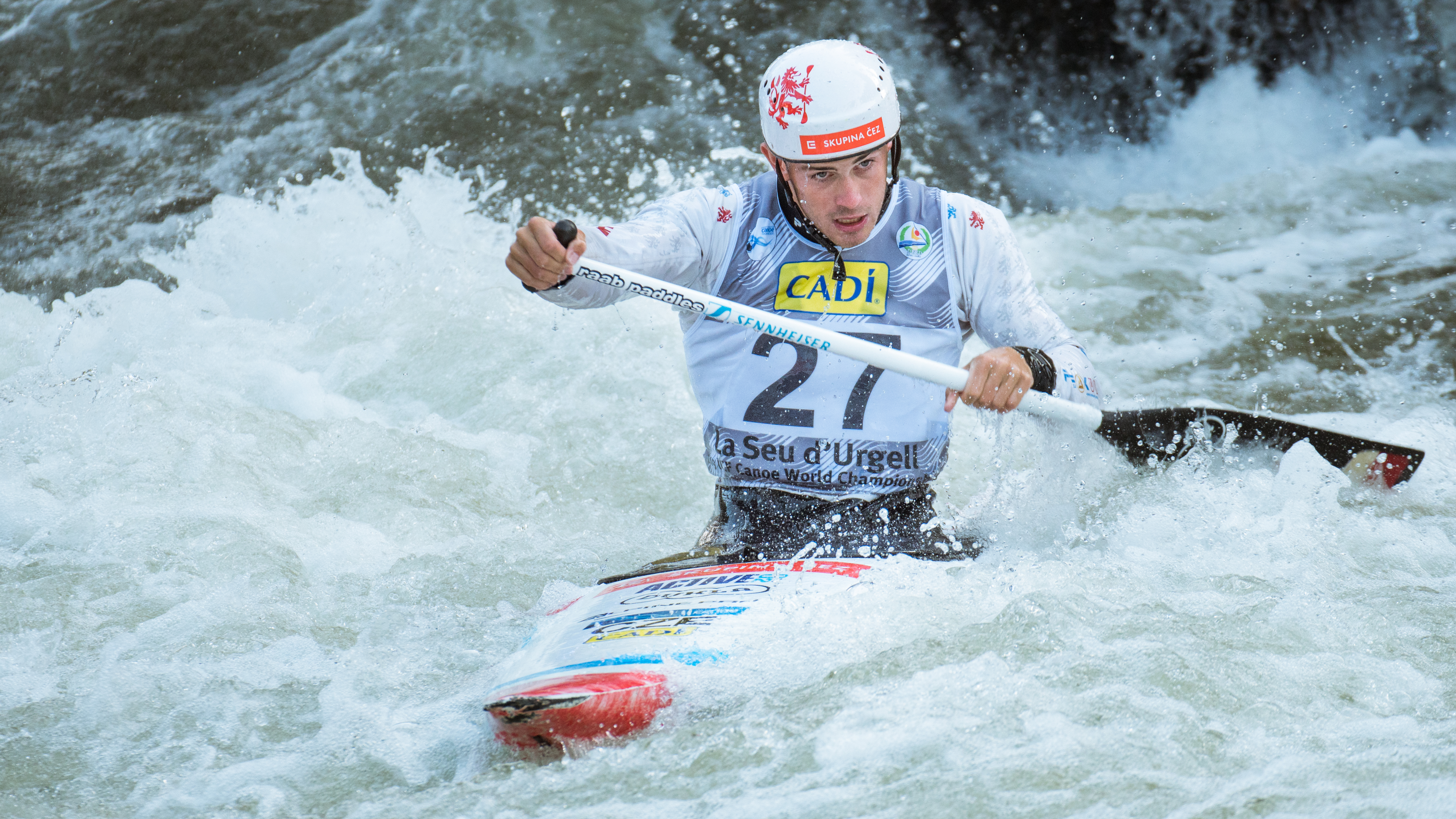
- Heger at the 2019 World Championships

Personal information
- Nationality: Czech
- Born: 23 August 2000 (age 26)
- Home town: Hradec Králové, Czech Republic

Sport
- Country: Czech Republic
- Sport: Canoe slalom
- Rank: No. 30 (C1)
- Events: C1, Kayak cross, C2, C2 mixed
- Club: ASC Dukla Praha
Medal record
Men's canoe slalom
Representing Czech Republic
World Championships
Silver medal – second place	2021 Bratislava	C1 team
U23 World Championships
Silver medal – second place	2019 Kraków	C2 Mixed
Silver medal – second place	2021 Tacen	C1 team
Bronze medal – third place	2017 Bratislava	C2
Bronze medal – third place	2019 Kraków	C1 team
Bronze medal – third place	2022 Ivrea	C1
U23 European Championships
Gold medal – first place	2020 Kraków	C1
Gold medal – first place	2022 České Budějovice	C1
Silver medal – second place	2019 Liptovský Mikuláš	C1 team
Silver medal – second place	2020 Kraków	C1 team
Silver medal – second place	2021 Solkan	C1
Silver medal – second place	2021 Solkan	C1 team
Silver medal – second place	2023 Bratislava	C1
Junior World Championships
Gold medal – first place	2017 Bratislava	C1 team
Silver medal – second place	2018 Ivrea	C1 team
Junior European Championships
Gold medal – first place	2017 Hohenlimburg	C1
Gold medal – first place	2017 Hohenlimburg	C1 team
Gold medal – first place	2018 Bratislava	C1 team

Vojtěch Heger (born 23 August 2000) is a Czech slalom canoeist who has competed at the international level since 2016. Heger competes in the C1 class and in kayak cross, having initially competed in C2 alongside his older brother Tomáš and later with Antonie Galušková.

Heger began paddling with KVS Hradec Králové in 2005, following his mother and brother into the sport. He moved to Brandýs nad Labem in 2015 and then to Prague, home of the Prague-Troja Canoeing Centre. He is currently studying physical education at Charles University.

He won a silver medal in the C1 team event at the 2021 World Championships in Bratislava alongside Lukáš Rohan and Václav Chaloupka, ending a seven-year drought for the Czech Republic in C1M events at the World Championships. He became U23 European Champion in the C1 event in 2020 in Kraków and vice-champion a year later in Solkan.

At the 2019 World Championships in La Seu d'Urgell, Heger finished 13th, securing an Olympic quota for the Czech Republic in the C1 event. He lost out in domestic selections to eventual silver medallist Lukáš Rohan, being named Olympic substitute.

Heger won the overall World Cup title in kayak cross in 2022. He finished 10th in the overall World Cup standings in the C1 class in 2021.

== Results ==
=== World Cup individual podiums ===
Season	Date	Venue	Position	Event
2022	4 September 2022	La Seu d'Urgell	1st	Kayak cross
2025	30 August 2025	Tacen	3rd	C1

=== Complete World Cup results ===
Year	Class	WC1	WC2	WC3	WC4	WC5	Points	Position
2017	C2	Prague (Czech Republic)	Augsburg (Germany)	Markkleeberg (Germany); 11	Ivrea (Italy); 10	La Seu (Spain)	–	18th
2019	C1	Lee Valley (United Kingdom); 28	Bratislava (Slovakia); 10	Tacen (Slovenia)	Markkleeberg (Germany); 21	Prague (Czech Republic); 16	119	18th
2020	C1	Tacen (Slovenia); 5	Pau (France); 6				N/A^{[a]}	
2021	C1	Prague (Czech Republic); 15	Markkleeberg (Germany); 13	La Seu (Spain); 17	Pau (France); 10		152	10th

Notes
^{a} No overall rankings were determined by the ICF, with only two races possible due to the COVID-19 pandemic.
