= Mathieu Voyemant =

French slalom canoeist

Medal record

Men's canoe slalom

Representing France

World Championships
| Silver medal – second place | 2007 Foz do Iguaçu | C2 team |

European Championships
| Silver medal – second place | 2009 Nottingham | C2 |

U23 European Championships
| Silver medal – second place | 2004 Kraków | C2 team |
| Silver medal – second place | 2005 Kraków | C2 |
| Silver medal – second place | 2006 Nottingham | C2 |

Junior European Championships
| Silver medal – second place | 2001 Bratislava | C1 team |

Mathieu Voyemant is a French slalom canoeist who competed at the international level from 2001 to 2009.

He won a silver medal in the C2 team event at the 2007 ICF Canoe Slalom World Championships in Foz do Iguaçu. He also won a silver medal in the C2 event at the 2009 European Championships in Nottingham.

His partner in the C2 boat was Damien Troquenet.
