= Amálie Hilgertová =

Czech canoeist (born 1997)

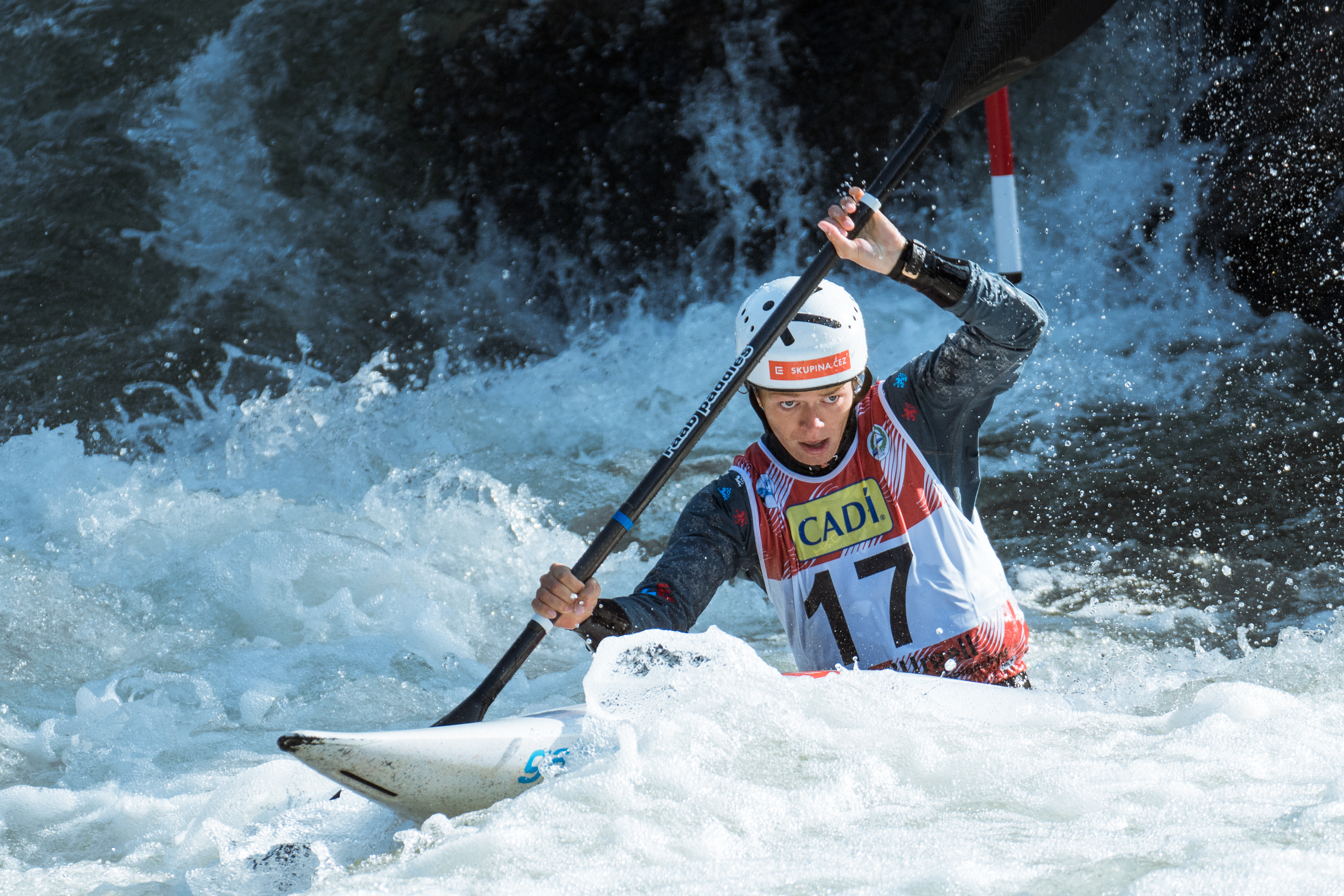

Personal information
- Nationality: Czech
- Born: 4 September 1997 (age 28) Brandýs nad Labem-Stará Boleslav, Czech Republic

Sport
- Country: Czech Republic
- Sport: Canoe slalom
- Event: K1
Medal record
Women's canoe slalom
Representing Czech Republic
World Championships
Silver medal – second place	2019 La Seu d'Urgell	K1 team
Bronze medal – third place	2017 Pau	Extreme K1
European Games
Silver medal – second place	2023 Kraków	K1 team
European Championships
Gold medal – first place	2019 Pau	K1
Bronze medal – third place	2020 Prague	K1
Youth Olympic Games
Bronze medal – third place	2014 Nanjing	K1
U23 World Championships
Gold medal – first place	2017 Bratislava	K1 team
Gold medal – first place	2019 Kraków	K1
Silver medal – second place	2016 Kraków	K1 team
Silver medal – second place	2018 Ivrea	K1 team
Silver medal – second place	2019 Kraków	K1 team
Silver medal – second place	2019 Kraków	Extreme K1
Bronze medal – third place	2018 Ivrea	Extreme K1
U23 European Championships
Gold medal – first place	2019 Liptovský Mikuláš	K1 team
Silver medal – second place	2016 Solkan	K1 team
Bronze medal – third place	2018 Bratislava	K1 team
Bronze medal – third place	2020 Kraków	K1 team
Junior World Championships
Gold medal – first place	2013 Liptovský Mikuláš	K1
Gold medal – first place	2013 Liptovský Mikuláš	K1 team
Gold medal – first place	2014 Penrith	K1 team
Gold medal – first place	2015 Foz do Iguaçu	K1 team
Junior European Championships
Gold medal – first place	2014 Skopje	K1 team
Silver medal – second place	2015 Kraków	K1 team
Bronze medal – third place	2013 Bourg-Saint-Maurice	K1 team

Amálie Hilgertová (born 4 September 1997) is a Czech slalom canoeist who has competed at the international level since 2013.

She won two medals at the ICF Canoe Slalom World Championships with a silver in 2019 (K1 team) and a bronze in 2017 (Extreme K1). She also won a gold and a bronze medal in the K1 event at the European Championships and a silver in the K1 team event at the 2023 European Games in Kraków.

== Family ==
She comes from a canoeing family. Her father is Ivan Hilgert, her mother is Marcela Hilgertová. Double Olympic champion Štěpánka Hilgertová is her aunt. Her uncle is Luboš Hilgert sr. and her cousin is Luboš Hilgert jr.

== World Cup individual podiums ==
Season	Date	Venue	Position	Event
2021	20 June 2021	Markkleeberg	3rd	Extreme K1
2022	18 June 2022	Kraków	3rd	K1
