= Mark Proctor (canoeist) =

British slalom canoeist (born 1988)

Medal record

Men's canoe slalom

Representing Great Britain

World Championships
Bronze medal – third place	2015 London	C2 team

U23 European Championships
Silver medal – second place	2011 Banja Luka	C1 team

Junior World Championships
Bronze medal – third place	2006 Solkan	C1 team

Junior European Championships
Bronze medal – third place	2006 Nottingham	C1

Mark Proctor (born 23 December 1988 in Stoke-on-Trent) is a British slalom canoeist who competed at the international level from 2004 to 2016.

He won a bronze medal in the C2 team event at the 2015 ICF Canoe Slalom World Championships in London.
