= Omar Raiba =

Italian canoeist

Medal record

Men's canoe slalom

Representing Italy

World Championships
Bronze medal – third place	2011 Bratislava	K1 team

U23 European Championships
Bronze medal – third place	2010 Markkleeberg	K1 team
Bronze medal – third place	2011 Banja Luka	K1 team

Omar Raiba (born 17 July 1988) is an Italian slalom canoeist who competed at the international level from 2004 to 2015.

He won a bronze medal in the K1 team event at the 2011 ICF Canoe Slalom World Championships in Bratislava.
