= 2014 European Junior and U23 Canoe Slalom Championships =

- Location: (North Macedonia) Skopje, Macedonia

The 2014 European Junior and U23 Canoe Slalom Championships took place in Skopje, Macedonia from 3 to 6 July 2014 under the auspices of the European Canoe Association (ECA). It was the 16th edition of the competition for Juniors (U18) and the 12th edition for the Under 23 category. A total of 20 medal events took place.

== Medal summary ==
=== Men ===
==== Canoe ====
===== Junior =====
Event	Gold		Silver		Bronze	
C1	Raffaello Ivaldi (ITA)	113.18	Florian Breuer (GER)	115.27	Marko Gurečka (SVK)	116.55
C1 team	Germany; Florian Breuer; Timo Trummer; Leon Hanika	132.91	Czech Republic; Václav Chaloupka; Tomáš Heger; Matyáš Lhota	133.54	Great Britain; Samuel Ibbotson; William Coney; Jac Davies	137.97
C2	Guillaume Graille/Lucas Roisin (FRA)	125.24	Jan Větrovský/Michael Matějka (CZE)	128.06	Igor Mikhailov/Nikolay Shkliaruk (RUS)	132.28
C2 team	Germany; Tilman Bayn/Leonard Bayn; Niklas Hecht/Alexander Weber; Paul Grunwald/Timo Trummer	156.04	Russia; Igor Mikhailov/Nikolay Shkliaruk; Aleksandr Bashmakov/Viacheslav Siriya; Roman Malyshev/Nikita Kazantsev	174.15	Great Britain; Crawford Niven/Angus Gibson; Jacob Holmes/Edward McDiarmid; Robert Harratt/William Smith	190.45

===== U23 =====
Event	Gold		Silver		Bronze	
C1	Maxime Perron (FRA)	106.55	Kilian Foulon (FRA)	107.09	Simon Le Friec (FRA)	107.41
C1 team	France; Maxime Perron; Simon Le Friec; Kilian Foulon	122.95	Great Britain; Ryan Westley; Thomas Quinn; Thomas Abbott	125.89	Russia; Ruslan Sayfiev; Alexander Ovchinikov; Kirill Setkin	127.13
C2	Hugo Cailhol/Nicolas Scianimanico (FRA)	118.70	Ryan Westley/Zachary Franklin (GBR)	118.71	Filip Brzeziński/Andrzej Brzeziński (POL)	118.88
C2 team	France; Yves Prigent/Loïc Kervella; Nicolas Scianimanico/Hugo Cailhol; Guillaume Graille/Lucas Roisin	142.19	Germany; Gabriel Holzapfel/Merlin Holzapfel; Aaron Jüttner/Piet Lennart Wagner; Hans Krüger/Paul Sommer	147.37	Russia; Vadim Voinalovich/Aleksei Popov; Egor Gover/Dmitriy Azanov; Nikolay Shkliaruk/Igor Mikhailov	154.24

==== Kayak ====
===== Junior =====
Event	Gold		Silver		Bronze	
K1	Jakob Weger (ITA)	105.74	Pol Oulhen (FRA)	106.19	Niko Testen (SLO)	106.98
K1 team	Germany; Leo Bolg; Thomas Strauss; Lukas Stahl	125.94	Spain; David Llorente; Unai Nabaskues; Jordi Cadena	126.57	Poland; Jakub Brzeziński; Wiktor Sandera; Krzysztof Majerczak	126.97

===== U23 =====
Event	Gold		Silver		Bronze	
K1	Rafał Polaczyk (POL)	99.31	Quentin Burgi (FRA)	99.96	Jiří Prskavec (CZE)	101.62
K1 team	Poland; Rafał Polaczyk; Michał Pasiut; Maciej Okręglak	115.41	Germany; Laurenz Laugwitz; Fabian Schweikert; Samuel Hegge	118.27	Italy; Giovanni De Gennaro; Luca Colazingari; Christian De Dionigi	118.58

=== Women ===
==== Canoe ====
===== Junior =====
Event	Gold		Silver		Bronze	
C1	Martina Satková (CZE)	131.76	Birgit Ohmayer (GER)	140.09	Karolin Wagner (GER)	140.19
C1 team	Spain; Miren Lazkano; Annebel van der Knijff; Klara Olazabal	161.57	Germany; Birgit Ohmayer; Karolin Wagner; Elena Apel	213.78	Czech Republic; Martina Satková; Anna Koblencová; Jana Matulková	225.15

===== U23 =====
Event	Gold		Silver		Bronze	
C1	Mallory Franklin (GBR)	122.72	Núria Vilarrubla (ESP)	125.44	Monika Jančová (CZE)	131.82
C1 team	Great Britain; Mallory Franklin; Jasmine Royle; Eilidh Gibson	160.97	Germany; Andrea Herzog; Rebekka Jüttner; Kira Kubbe	169.76	Russia; Polina Mukhgaleeva; Zulfiia Sabitova; Anastasia Tropkina	177.19

==== Kayak ====
===== Junior =====
Event	Gold		Silver		Bronze	
K1	Anna Faber (GER)	122.41	Klaudia Zwolińska (POL)	123.04	Camille Prigent (FRA)	124.30
K1 team	Czech Republic; Sabina Foltysová; Amálie Hilgertová; Tereza Fišerová	144.98	Germany; Anna Faber; Selina Jones; Andrea Herzog	147.17	Spain; Miren Lazkano; Irene Egües; Klara Olazabal	155.52

===== U23 =====
Event	Gold		Silver		Bronze	
K1	Stefanie Horn (ITA)	113.80	Karolína Galušková (CZE)	115.30	Eva Terčelj (SLO)	116.60
K1 team	Slovenia; Eva Terčelj; Ajda Novak; Nina Bizjak	138.28	Germany; Lisa Fritsche; Caroline Trompeter; Leonie Meyer	141.48	France; Estelle Mangin; Lucie Baudu; Cécile Tixier	141.98

== Medal table ==
Rank	Nation	Gold	Silver	Bronze	Total
1	France (FRA)	5	3	3	11
2	Germany (GER)	4	8	1	13
3	Italy (ITA)	3	0	1	4
4	Czech Republic (CZE)	2	3	3	8
5	Great Britain (GBR)	2	2	2	6
6	Poland (POL)	2	1	2	5
7	Spain (ESP)	1	2	1	4
8	Slovenia (SLO)	1	0	2	3
9	Russia (RUS)	0	1	4	5
10	Slovakia (SVK)	0	0	1	1
Totals (10 entries)		20	20	20	60
