= 2013 European Junior and U23 Canoe Slalom Championships =

- Location: Bourg-Saint-Maurice, France

The 2013 European Junior and U23 Canoe Slalom Championships took place in Bourg-Saint-Maurice, France from 31 July to 4 August 2013 under the auspices of the European Canoe Association (ECA). It was the 15th edition of the competition for Juniors (U18) and the 11th edition for the Under 23 category. A total of 19 medal events took place. No medals were awarded for the junior women's C1 team event due to low number of participating countries.

== Medal summary ==
=== Men ===
==== Canoe ====
===== Junior =====
Event	Gold		Silver		Bronze	
C1	Cédric Joly (FRA)	105.89	Lukáš Rohan (CZE)	107.33	Florian Breuer (GER)	108.08
C1 team	Great Britain; Thomas Abbott; Samuel Ibbotson; Daniel Evans	116.53	France; Cédric Joly; Julian Othenin-Girard; Erwan Marchais	116.68	Russia; Pavel Smirnov; Yuri Snegirev; Aleksei Popov	119.14
C2	Matúš Gewissler/Juraj Skákala (SVK)	114.94	Jakob Jeklin/Niko Testen (SLO)	115.78	Thomas Schmitt/Yann Rivallant (FRA)	121.16
C2 team	France; Thomas Schmitt/Yann Rivallant; Malo Poles/Baptiste Le Poncin; Antoine Gaillard/Antonin Elne	139.98	Czech Republic; Jan Větrovský/Michael Matějka; Jakub Franek/Vladimír Zátopek; Jan Mrázek/Tomáš Rousek	140.47	Germany; Hans Krüger/Paul Sommer; Aaron Jüttner/Piet Lennart Wagner; Florian Beste/Sören Loos	140.97

===== U23 =====
Event	Gold		Silver		Bronze	
C1	Matija Marinić (CRO)	100.00	Anže Berčič (SLO)	100.57	Thomas Quinn (GBR)	100.73
C1 team	France; Maxime Perron; Simon Le Friec; Kilian Foulon	111.33	Poland; Kacper Gondek; Wojciech Pasiut; Arkadiusz Nieć	111.46	Spain; David Pérez; Aitor Garmendia; Lluis Pares	116.25
C2	Jonáš Kašpar/Marek Šindler (CZE)	103.00	Daniel Marzo/Jesús Pérez (ESP)	107.79	Filip Brzeziński/Andrzej Brzeziński (POL)	108.03
C2 team	Poland; Filip Brzeziński/Andrzej Brzeziński; Michał Wiercioch/Grzegorz Majerczak; Wojciech Pasiut/Kacper Gondek	132.48	Russia; Anton Ushakov/Artem Ushakov; Pavel Kovalkov/Artem Bogdanov; Pavel Eigel/Ruslan Sayfiev	134.57	Spain; Ekhi Diez/David Pérez; Jesús Pérez/Aitor Garmendia; Daniel Marzo/Jokin Sánchez	136.82

==== Kayak ====
===== Junior =====
Event	Gold		Silver		Bronze	
K1	Jakub Grigar (SVK)	95.57	Bastien Damiens (FRA)	96.29	Vid Karner (SLO)	98.20
K1 team	Germany; Leo Bolg; David Franke; Felix Merklein	107.14	Spain; Jordi Cadena; Unai Nabaskues; Juan Martínez	108.33	Poland; Eryk Lejmel; Bartosz Dębowski; Kacper Ćwik	108.84

===== U23 =====
Event	Gold		Silver		Bronze	
K1	Martin Halčin (SVK)	94.79	Joe Clarke (GBR)	95.15	Giovanni De Gennaro (ITA)	95.60
K1 team	Czech Republic; Zdeněk Ornst; Ondřej Tunka; Ondřej Cvikl	101.87	France; Vivien Colober; Benjamin Renia; Mathieu Biazizzo	103.52	Poland; Rafał Polaczyk; Michał Pasiut; Maciej Okręglak	104.49

=== Women ===
==== Canoe ====
===== Junior =====
Event	Gold		Silver		Bronze	
C1	Kimberley Woods (GBR)	114.67	Nadine Weratschnig (AUT)	115.79	Jana Matulková (CZE)	126.73
C1 team (non-medal event)	France; Charlotte Abba; Lucie Prioux; Laura Ligeon	162.66	Czech Republic; Anna Koblencová; Jana Matulková; Barbora Čekalová	189.18	-	

===== U23 =====
Event	Gold		Silver		Bronze	
C1	Mallory Franklin (GBR)	110.92	Núria Vilarrubla (ESP)	114.82	Monika Jančová (CZE)	117.17
C1 team	France; Cécile Tixier; Annaëlle Meheut; Marlene Rio	150.25	Germany; Karolin Wagner; Birgit Ohmayer; Kira Kubbe	162.81	Russia; Anastasia Tropkina; Polina Mukhgaleeva; Zulfiia Sabitova	170.03

==== Kayak ====
===== Junior =====
Event	Gold		Silver		Bronze	
K1	Lisa Leitner (AUT)	110.46	Karolína Galušková (CZE)	113.69	Julia Cuchi (ESP)	139.26
K1 team	Spain; Julia Cuchi; Miren Lazkano; Annebel van der Knijff	125.11	Great Britain; Kimberley Woods; Lauren Strickland; Amy Hollick	127.89	Czech Republic; Karolína Galušková; Amálie Hilgertová; Tereza Fišerová	129.12

===== U23 =====
Event	Gold		Silver		Bronze	
K1	Ricarda Funk (GER)	106.38	Nouria Newman (FRA)	109.34	Estelle Mangin (FRA)	110.46
K1 team	Czech Republic; Kateřina Kudějová; Veronika Vojtová; Pavlína Zástěrová	120.02	Italy; Stefanie Horn; Maria Clara Giai Pron; Chiara Sabattini	120.30	France; Estelle Mangin; Nouria Newman; Josepha Longa	120.38

== Medal table ==
Rank	Nation	Gold	Silver	Bronze	Total
1	France (FRA)	4	4	3	11
2	Czech Republic (CZE)	3	3	3	9
3	Great Britain (GBR)	3	2	1	6
4	Slovakia (SVK)	3	0	0	3
5	Germany (GER)	2	1	2	5
6	Spain (ESP)	1	3	3	7
7	Poland (POL)	1	1	3	5
8	Austria (AUT)	1	1	0	2
9	Croatia (CRO)	1	0	0	1
10	Slovenia (SLO)	0	2	1	3
11	Russia (RUS)	0	1	2	3
12	Italy (ITA)	0	1	1	2
Totals (12 entries)		19	19	19	57
