= Cédric Joly =

French canoeist

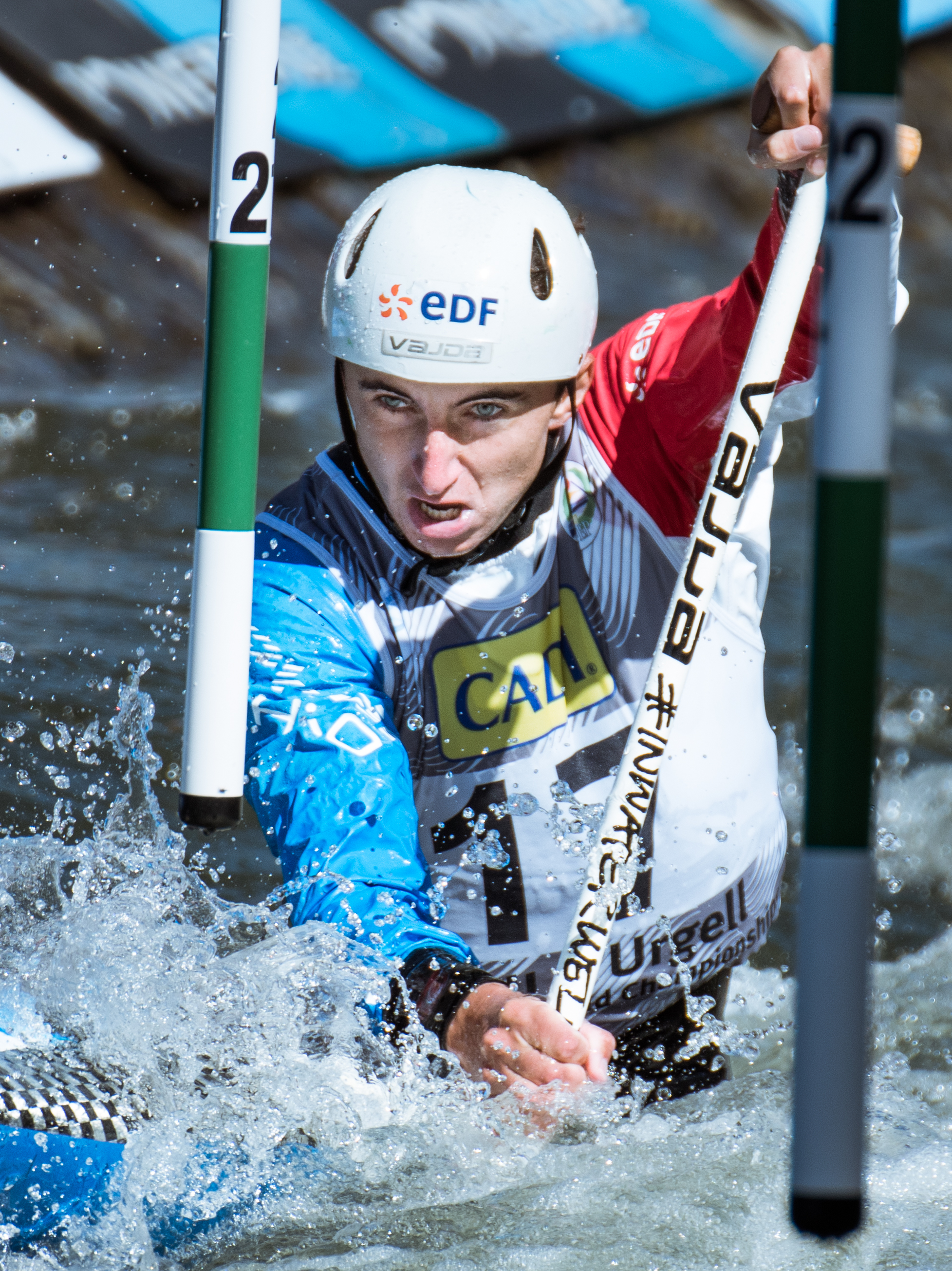

Personal information
- Nationality: French
- Born: 25 January 1995 (age 31)

Sport
- Country: France
- Sport: Canoe slalom
- Event: C1
- Club: Canoë Kayak du Pays de Brocéliande
Medal record
Men's canoe slalom
Representing France
World Championships
Gold medal – first place	2019 La Seu d'Urgell	C1
European Championships
Gold medal – first place	2018 Prague	C1 team
Silver medal – second place	2019 Pau	C1 team
U23 World Championships
Gold medal – first place	2016 Kraków	C1 team
Silver medal – second place	2018 Ivrea	C1 team
Bronze medal – third place	2014 Penrith	C1 team
Bronze medal – third place	2017 Bratislava	C1 team
Bronze medal – third place	2018 Ivrea	C1
U23 European Championships
Gold medal – first place	2016 Solkan	C1 team
Gold medal – first place	2017 Hohenlimburg	C1 team
Gold medal – first place	2018 Bratislava	C1
Silver medal – second place	2017 Hohenlimburg	C1
Bronze medal – third place	2012 Solkan	C1 team
Bronze medal – third place	2015 Kraków	C1 team
Bronze medal – third place	2018 Bratislava	C1 team
Junior World Championships
Gold medal – first place	2012 Wausau	C1
Gold medal – first place	2012 Wausau	C1 team
Gold medal – first place	2013 Liptovský Mikuláš	C1
Bronze medal – third place	2013 Liptovský Mikuláš	C1 team
Junior European Championships
Gold medal – first place	2013 Bourg-Saint-Maurice	C1
Silver medal – second place	2013 Bourg-Saint-Maurice	C1 team

Cédric Joly (born 25 January 1995) is a French slalom canoeist who has competed at the international level since 2012.

He won a gold medal in the C1 event at the 2019 ICF Canoe Slalom World Championships in La Seu d'Urgell. He also won a gold and a silver medal in the C1 team event at the European Championships.
