= Loïc Kervella =

French canoeist

Personal information
- Born: 2 November 1993 (age 32)
- Height: 171 cm (5 ft 7 in)
- Weight: 78 kg (172 lb)

Sport
- Club: Quimper
- Coached by: Thierry Saidï
Medal record
Men's canoe slalom
Representing France
World Championships
Gold medal – first place	2015 London	C2 team
U23 World Championships
Bronze medal – third place	2013 Liptovský Mikuláš	C2 team
Bronze medal – third place	2016 Kraków	C2
U23 European Championships
Gold medal – first place	2014 Skopje	C2 team
Junior European Championships
Silver medal – second place	2011 Banja Luka	C2

Loïc Kervella (born 2 November 1993) is a French slalom canoeist who has competed at the international level since 2011.

He won a gold medal in the C2 team event at the 2015 ICF Canoe Slalom World Championships in London.

His partner in the C2 boat is Yves Prigent.

== World Cup individual podiums ==
Season	Date	Venue	Position	Event
2015	16 August 2015	Pau	3rd	C2
