= 2016 European Junior and U23 Canoe Slalom Championships =

- Location: Solkan, Slovenia

The 2016 European Junior and U23 Canoe Slalom Championships took place in Solkan, Slovenia from 24 to 28 August 2016 under the auspices of the European Canoe Association (ECA). It was the 18th edition of the competition for Juniors (U18) and the 14th edition for the Under 23 category. A total of 19 medal events took place. The men's junior C2 team event did not take place.

== Medal summary ==
=== Men ===
==== Canoe ====
===== Junior =====
Event	Gold		Silver		Bronze	
C1	Matyáš Lhota (CZE)	100.26	Marko Mirgorodský (SVK)	101.26	Václav Chaloupka (CZE)	102.32
C1 team	Italy; Carlo Bullo; Gabriele Ciulla; Mandi Mandia	115.47	Czech Republic; Václav Chaloupka; Matyáš Lhota; Matouš Příhoda	115.87	Slovenia; Jakob Jeklin; Tine Kancler; Urh Turnšek	120.11
C2	Pavel Kotov/Sergei Komkov (RUS)	115.74	Jakub Brzeziński/Kacper Sztuba (POL)	118.37	Eric Borrmann/Leo Braune (GER)	121.34

===== U23 =====
Event	Gold		Silver		Bronze	
C1	Ryan Westley (GBR)	97.42	Lukáš Rohan (CZE)	99.87	Kirill Setkin (RUS)	100.40
C1 team	France; Cédric Joly; Thibault Blaise; Erwan Marchais	114.77	Russia; Kirill Setkin; Nikolay Shkliaruk; Alexander Nepogodin	116.53	Germany; Florian Breuer; Dennis Söter; Gregor Kreul	120.17
C2	Matúš Gewissler/Juraj Skákala (SVK)	105.04	Michał Wiercioch/Grzegorz Majerczak (POL)	105.87	Nikolay Shkliaruk/Igor Mikhailov (RUS)	108.98
C2 team	Poland; Filip Brzeziński/Andrzej Brzeziński; Michał Wiercioch/Grzegorz Majerczak; Jakub Brzeziński/Kacper Sztuba	128.94	Russia; Aleksei Popov/Vadim Voinalovich; Nikolay Shkliaruk/Igor Mikhailov; Pavel Kotov/Sergei Komkov	132.91	Germany; Niklas Hecht/Alexander Weber; Florian Beste/Sören Loos; Fritz Lehrach/Lennard Tuchscherer	137.33

==== Kayak ====
===== Junior =====
Event	Gold		Silver		Bronze	
K1	Jakob Weger (ITA)	91.89	Felix Oschmautz (AUT)	93.01	Jakob Jež (SLO)	94.15
K1 team	Germany; Thomas Strauss; Noah Hegge; Lukas Stahl	111.07	Spain; Eneko Auzmendi; Manuel Ochoa; Nil García	112.32	Italy; Jakob Weger; Valentin Luther; Martin Unterthurner	112.46

===== U23 =====
Event	Gold		Silver		Bronze	
K1	Andrej Málek (SVK)	90.60	Clément Travert (FRA)	92.95	Stefan Hengst (GER)	94.73
K1 team	Slovenia; Simon Brus; Martin Srabotnik; Žan Jakše	104.43	Italy; Zeno Ivaldi; Marcello Beda; Marco Vianello	106.06	Russia; Maxim Shabanov; Nikita Gubenko; Alexander Nepogodin	109.36

=== Women ===
==== Canoe ====
===== Junior =====
Event	Gold		Silver		Bronze	
C1	Simona Maceková (SVK)	115.81	Kira Kubbe (GER)	117.81	Tereza Fišerová (CZE)	118.26
C1 team	Slovakia; Simona Glejteková; Soňa Stanovská; Simona Maceková	133.72	Czech Republic; Martina Satková; Tereza Fišerová; Eva Říhová	137.06	France; Marjorie Delassus; Fanchon Janssen; Azénor Philip	147.94

===== U23 =====
Event	Gold		Silver		Bronze	
C1	Kimberley Woods (GBR)	111.18	Jasmine Royle (GBR)	114.76	Viktoria Wolffhardt (AUT)	116.20
C1 team	Great Britain; Kimberley Woods; Jasmine Royle; Eilidh Gibson	133.93	Spain; Miren Lazkano; Annebel van der Knijff; Klara Olazabal	134.26	Czech Republic; Jana Matulková; Gabriela Satková; Alexandra Vrbová	148.06

==== Kayak ====
===== Junior =====
Event	Gold		Silver		Bronze	
K1	Klaudia Zwolińska (POL)	108.52	Michaela Haššová (SVK)	108.55	Laia Sorribes (ESP)	109.83
K1 team	Czech Republic; Tereza Fišerová; Antonie Galušková; Kateřina Dušková	127.99	Slovakia; Michaela Haššová; Soňa Stanovská; Lucia Murzová	128.68	Russia; Alsu Minazova; Anastasia Kozyreva; Daria Shaidurova	130.41

===== U23 =====
Event	Gold		Silver		Bronze	
K1	Viktoria Wolffhardt (AUT)	103.69	Kimberley Woods (GBR)	104.21	Lisa Fritsche (GER)	107.97
K1 team	Germany; Lisa Fritsche; Caroline Trompeter; Selina Jones	121.88	Czech Republic; Karolína Galušková; Amálie Hilgertová; Barbora Valíková	126.27	Spain; Laia Sorribes; Irene Egües; Julia Cuchi	128.57

== Medal table ==
Rank	Nation	Gold	Silver	Bronze	Total
1	Slovakia (SVK)	4	3	0	7
2	Great Britain (GBR)	3	2	0	5
3	Czech Republic (CZE)	2	4	3	9
4	Poland (POL)	2	2	0	4
5	Germany (GER)	2	1	5	8
6	Italy (ITA)	2	1	1	4
7	Russia (RUS)	1	2	4	7
8	Austria (AUT)	1	1	1	3
8	France (FRA)	1	1	1	3
10	Slovenia (SLO)	1	0	2	3
11	Spain (ESP)	0	2	2	4
Totals (11 entries)		19	19	19	57
