= Lisa Leitner =

Austrian canoeist (born 1995)

Personal information
- Born: 3 April 1995 (age 31)
Medal record
Women's canoe slalom
Representing Austria
World Championships
Silver medal – second place	2014 Deep Creek Lake	K1 team
Silver medal – second place	2017 Pau	K1 team
European Championships
Silver medal – second place	2018 Prague	K1 team
U23 World Championships
Gold medal – first place	2015 Foz do Iguaçu	K1 team
Silver medal – second place	2018 Ivrea	K1
Bronze medal – third place	2015 Foz do Iguaçu	K1
U23 European Championships
Silver medal – second place	2011 Banja Luka	K1 team
Bronze medal – third place	2010 Markkleeberg	K1 team
Junior European Championships
Gold medal – first place	2013 Bourg-Saint-Maurice	K1

Lisa Leitner (born 3 April 1995) is an Austrian slalom canoeist who has competed at the international level since 2010.

She won two silver medals in the K1 team event at the ICF Canoe Slalom World Championships, earning them in 2014 and 2017. She also won a silver medal in the same event at the 2018 European Championships in Prague.

Her younger brother Mario is also a slalom canoeist.

== World Cup individual podiums ==
Season	Date	Venue	Position	Event
2017	3 Sep 2017	Ivrea	3rd	K1
