= Pavel Kotov (canoeist) =

Russian slalom canoeist

Personal information
- Nationality: Russian
- Born: 22 March 1998 (age 28)

Sport
- Country: Russia
- Sport: Canoe slalom
- Event: C1, C2
Medal record
Men's canoe slalom
Representing Russia
World Championships
Bronze medal – third place	2019 La Seu d'Urgell	C1 team
European Championships
Bronze medal – third place	2019 Pau	C1 team
U23 European Championships
Gold medal – first place	2020 Kraków	C1 team
Silver medal – second place	2016 Solkan	C2 team
Bronze medal – third place	2017 Hohenlimburg	C2
Junior World Championships
Silver medal – second place	2016 Kraków	C1 team
Junior European Championships
Gold medal – first place	2016 Solkan	C2
Silver medal – second place	2015 Kraków	C2
Bronze medal – third place	2015 Kraków	C2 team

Pavel Kotov (born 22 March 1998) is a Russian slalom canoeist who has competed at the international level since 2015.

He won a bronze medal in the C1 team event at the 2019 ICF Canoe Slalom World Championships in La Seu d'Urgell.
