= List of ICF World Junior Canoe Slalom Championships medalists =

This is a list of medalists from the ICF World Junior and U23 Canoe Slalom Championships in the junior (under 18) category.

== Individual ==
=== Canoe Single (C1) Men ===
Championships	Gold	Silver	Bronze
1986 Spittal	Jed Prentice (USA)	Boštjan Žitnik (YUG)	Karel Kaufmann (FRG)
1988 La Seu d'Urgell	Gareth Marriott (GBR)	Michael Dötsch (FRG)	Adam Clawson (USA)
1990 Tavanasa	Danko Herceg (YUG)	Patrice Estanguet (FRA)	Adam Clawson (USA)
1992 Sjoa	Simon Hočevar (SLO)	David Jančar (TCH)	Justin Boocock (AUS)
1994 Wausau	Michal Martikán (SVK)	Mariusz Wieczorek (POL)	Dejan Stevanovič (SLO)
1996 Lipno	Jan Mašek (CZE)	Michal Martikán (SVK)	Stanislav Gejdoš (SVK)
1998 Lofer	Lukáš Přinda (CZE)	Alexander Slafkovský (SVK)	Primož Gabrijelčič (SLO)
2000 Bratislava	Alexander Slafkovský (SVK)	Přemysl Vlk (CZE)	Jan Benzien (GER)
2002 Nowy Sącz	Timo Wirsching (GER)	Jarosław Chwastowicz (POL)	Lukas Hoffmann (GER)
2004 Lofer	Martin Unger (GER)	Matej Beňuš (SVK)	Christos Tsakmakis (GRE)
2006 Solkan	Dawid Bartos (POL)	Norbert Neveu (FRA)	Sideris Tasiadis (GER)
2008 Roudnice nad Labem	Sideris Tasiadis (GER)	Teng Zhiqiang (CHN)	Alexander Funk (GER)
2010 Foix	Kirill Setkin (RUS)	Kacper Gondek (POL)	Roberto Colazingari (ITA)
2012 Wausau	Cédric Joly (FRA)	Dennis Söter (GER)	Marek Cepek (CZE)
2013 Liptovský Mikuláš	Cédric Joly (FRA)	Lukáš Rohan (CZE)	Jakob Jeklin (SLO)
2014 Penrith	Florian Breuer (GER)	Liam Jegou (IRL)	Roman Malyshev (RUS)
2015 Foz do Iguaçu	Marko Mirgorodský (SVK)	Kacper Sztuba (POL)	Václav Chaloupka (CZE)
2016 Kraków	Marko Mirgorodský (SVK)	Matyáš Lhota (CZE)	Gregor Kreul (GER)
2017 Bratislava	Kacper Sztuba (POL)	Miquel Travé (ESP)	Lennard Tuchscherer (GER)
2018 Ivrea	Miquel Travé (ESP)	Flavio Micozzi (ITA)	Nicolas Gestin (FRA)
2019 Kraków	Nejc Polenčič (SLO)	Szymon Nowobilski (POL)	Adrien Fischer (FRA)
2021 Tacen	Martino Barzon (ITA)	Martin Kratochvíl (CZE)	Adam Král (CZE)
2022 Ivrea	Mark Crosbee (AUS)	Michal Urban (CZE)	Lukáš Kratochvíl (CZE)
2023 Kraków	Žiga Lin Hočevar (SLO)	Martin Cornu (FRA)	Lukáš Kratochvíl (CZE)
2024 Liptovský Mikuláš	Žiga Lin Hočevar (SLO)	Martin Cornu (FRA)	Niels Zimmermann (GER)
2025 Foix	Oier Díaz (ESP)	Žiga Lin Hočevar (SLO)	Titouan Estanguet (FRA)
2026 Kraków	Dominik Egyházy (SVK)	Dominik Řežábek (CZE)	Ioannis Zachos (GRE)

=== Canoe Double (C2) Men ===
Discontinued: 2017.

Championships	Gold	Silver	Bronze
1988 La Seu d'Urgell	Brian Holden/Jason Bennett (GBR)	Juraj Mikuš/Marcel Kollár (TCH)	Marek Lubušký/Martin Král (TCH)
1990 Tavanasa	Krzysztof Kołomański/Michał Staniszewski (POL)	Alexandre Lauvergne/Nathanael Fouquet (FRA)	Ladislav Šmakal/David Svoboda (TCH)
1992 Sjoa	Roman Štrba/Roman Vajs (TCH)	Marek Jiras/Tomáš Máder (TCH)	Pierre Luquet/Christophe Luquet (FRA)
1994 Wausau	Štěpán Chromovský/Jan Jireš (CZE)	Chris Ennis/John Grumbine (USA)	Jaroslav Volf/Ondřej Štěpánek (CZE)
1996 Lipno	Jaroslav Volf/Ondřej Štěpánek (CZE)	Kay Simon/Robby Simon (GER)	Konrad Korzeniewski/Jarosław Nawrocki (POL)
1998 Lofer	Marcus Becker/Stefan Henze (GER)	Roman Cebula/Maciej Danek (POL)	Martin Rasner/Jan Hošek (CZE)
2000 Bratislava	Martin Braud/Cédric Forgit (FRA)	Ladislav Škantár/Peter Škantár (SVK)	Julien Gaspard/Remy Gaspard (FRA)
2002 Nowy Sącz	Felix Michel/Sebastian Piersig (GER)	Marcin Pochwała/Paweł Sarna (POL)	Jakub Sierota/Michał Kozial (POL)
2004 Lofer (non-medal event)	Michael Bartsch/Michael Wiedemann (GER)	Kai Müller/Kevin Müller (GER)	Aymeric Maynadier/Sébastien Perilhou (FRA)
2006 Solkan	Hugo Biso/Pierre Picco (FRA)	Kai Müller/Kevin Müller (GER)	Robert Behling/Thomas Becker (GER)
2008 Roudnice nad Labem	Robert Gotvald/Jan Vlček (CZE)	Ondřej Karlovský/Jakub Jáně (CZE)	Patryk Brzeziński/Dariusz Chlebek (POL)
2010 Foix	Filip Brzeziński/Andrzej Brzeziński (POL)	Jan Michael Müller/Marcel Prinz (GER)	Michał Wiercioch/Grzegorz Majerczak (POL)
2012 Wausau	Pavel Kovalkov/Artem Bogdanov (RUS)	Lukáš Rohan/Adam Svoboda (CZE)	Radek Pospíchal/Marek Cepek (CZE)
2013 Liptovský Mikuláš	Matúš Gewissler/Juraj Skákala (SVK)	Aleksei Popov/Vadim Voinalovich (RUS)	Aaron Jüttner/Piet Lennart Wagner (GER)
2014 Penrith	Michael Matějka/Jan Větrovský (CZE)	Daniel Munro/Luke Robinson (NZL)	Adam Kozub/Jakub Brzeziński (POL)
2015 Foz do Iguaçu	Guillaume Graille/Lucas Roisin (FRA)	Michael Matějka/Jan Větrovský (CZE)	Niklas Hecht/Alexander Weber (GER)
2016 Kraków	Albert Kašpar/Vojtěch Mrůzek (CZE)	Lennard Tuchscherer/Fritz Lehrach (GER)	Jakub Brzeziński/Kacper Sztuba (POL)
2017 Bratislava (non-medal event)	Vít Pohanka/Denis Wendl (CZE)	Jan Vrublovský/Petr Novotný (CZE)	Daniil Lipikhin/Igor Stafeev (RUS)

=== Kayak (K1) Men ===
Championships	Gold	Silver	Bronze
1986 Spittal	Marko Černe (YUG)	Ian Wiley (IRL)	Tomaž Štokelj (YUG)
1988 La Seu d'Urgell	Scott Shipley (USA)	Claudio Roviera (ITA)	Andraž Vehovar (YUG)
1990 Tavanasa	Alexandr Adámek (TCH)	Peter Buckley (GBR)	Jiří Prskavec (TCH)
1992 Sjoa	James Croft (GBR)	Dejan Kralj (SLO)	Gustavo Selbach (BRA)
1994 Wausau	Pavol Hric (SVK)	Ralf Schaberg (GER)	Dejan Kralj (SLO)
1996 Lipno	Sam Oud (NED)	Floris Braat (NED)	Ivan Pišvejc (CZE)
1998 Lofer	Miha Terdič (SLO)	Michael Kurt (SUI)	Peter Cibák (SVK)
2000 Bratislava	Ján Šajbidor (SVK)	Jens Ewald (GER)	Przemysław Popis (POL)
2002 Nowy Sącz	Grzegorz Polaczyk (POL)	Lukáš Kubričan (CZE)	Daniele Molmenti (ITA)
2004 Lofer	Alexander Grimm (GER)	Michal Buchtel (CZE)	Vavřinec Hradilek (CZE)
2006 Solkan	Mateusz Polaczyk (POL)	Sebastian Schubert (GER)	Hannes Aigner (GER)
2008 Roudnice nad Labem	Martin Halčin (SVK)	Martin Albreht (SLO)	Benjamin Renia (FRA)
2010 Foix	Giovanni De Gennaro (ITA)	Simon Brus (SLO)	Zeno Ivaldi (ITA)
2012 Wausau	Miroslav Urban (SVK)	Tom Scianimanico (FRA)	Jakub Grigar (SVK)
2013 Liptovský Mikuláš	Jakub Grigar (SVK)	Andrej Málek (SVK)	Bastien Damiens (FRA)
2014 Penrith	Mario Leitner (AUT)	Vid Kuder Marušič (SLO)	Jakub Grigar (SVK)
2015 Foz do Iguaçu	Jakub Grigar (SVK)	Malo Quéméneur (FRA)	Thomas Strauss (GER)
2016 Kraków	Ruslan Pestov (UKR)	Felix Oschmautz (AUT)	Wiktor Sandera (POL)
2017 Bratislava	Felix Oschmautz (AUT)	Tomáš Zima (CZE)	Jan Bárta (CZE)
2018 Ivrea	Jan Bárta (CZE)	Anatole Delassus (FRA)	Tomáš Zima (CZE)
2019 Kraków	Anatole Delassus (FRA)	Jakub Krejčí (CZE)	Vid Oštrbenk (SLO)
2021 Tacen	Titouan Castryck (FRA)	Martin Rudorfer (CZE)	Jan Ločnikar (SLO)
2022 Ivrea	Titouan Castryck (FRA)	Štěpán Venc (CZE)	Sam Leaver (GBR)
2023 Kraków	Xabier Ferrazzi (ITA)	Martin Cornu (FRA)	Žiga Lin Hočevar (SLO)
2024 Liptovský Mikuláš	Žiga Lin Hočevar (SLO)	Martin Cornu (FRA)	Michal Kopeček (CZE)
2025 Foix	Michal Kopeček (CZE)	Žiga Lin Hočevar (SLO)	Titouan Estanguet (FRA)
2026 Kraków	Max Steinbrenner (AUT)	Léo Royé (FRA)	Marek Kulczycki (POL)

=== Kayak Cross Men ===
Championships	Gold	Silver	Bronze
2018 Ivrea	Jan Rohrer (SUI)	Jakub Krejčí (CZE)	Pau Echaniz (ESP)
2019 Kraków	Etienne Chappell (GBR)	Egor Smirnov (RUS)	Jakob Hein (GER)
2021 Tacen	Kaelin Friedenson (USA)	Martin Rudorfer (CZE)	George Snook (NZL)
2022 Ivrea	Hugo Monasse (FRA)	Martin Cornu (FRA)	Serhii Sovko (UKR)
2023 Kraków	Michele Pistoni (ITA)	Martin Cornu (FRA)	Kyler James Long (USA)
2024 Liptovský Mikuláš	Faust Clotet Juanmarti (ESP)	Žiga Lin Hočevar (SLO)	Jonah Hanrahan (GBR)
2025 Foix	Žiga Lin Hočevar (SLO)	Oier Díaz (ESP)	Faust Clotet Juanmarti (ESP)
2026 Kraków	Marek Petřík (CZE)	Max Steinbrenner (AUT)	Marek Kulczycki (POL)

=== Kayak Cross Individual Men ===
Championships	Gold	Silver	Bronze
2025 Foix	Žiga Lin Hočevar (SLO)	Faust Clotet Juanmarti (ESP)	Clément Davy (FRA)
2026 Kraków	Marek Kulczycki (POL)	Arkhyp Krachko (UKR)	Tobiáš Novák (CZE)

=== Canoe Single (C1) Women ===
Championships	Gold	Silver	Bronze
2010 Foix	Jessica Fox (AUS)	Teng Qianqian (CHN)	Hailey Thompson (USA)
2012 Wausau	Jessica Fox (AUS)	Mallory Franklin (GBR)	Kimberley Woods (GBR)
2013 Liptovský Mikuláš	Karolin Wagner (GER)	Anna Koblencová (CZE)	Ana Sátila (BRA)
2014 Penrith	Lucie Prioux (FRA)	Martina Satková (CZE)	Anna Koblencová (CZE)
2015 Foz do Iguaçu	Andrea Herzog (GER)	Lucie Prioux (FRA)	Kate Eckhardt (AUS)
2016 Kraków	Tereza Fišerová (CZE)	Andrea Herzog (GER)	Kira Kubbe (GER)
2017 Bratislava	Andrea Herzog (GER)	Soňa Stanovská (SVK)	Marta Bertoncelli (ITA)
2018 Ivrea	Gabriela Satková (CZE)	Marta Bertoncelli (ITA)	Soňa Stanovská (SVK)
2019 Kraków	Gabriela Satková (CZE)	Tereza Kneblová (CZE)	Marta Bertoncelli (ITA)
2021 Tacen	Klára Kneblová (CZE)	Tereza Kneblová (CZE)	Evy Leibfarth (USA)
2022 Ivrea	Zuzana Paňková (SVK)	Nora López (ESP)	Lucie Krech (GER)
2023 Kraków	Paulina Pirro (GER)	Christin Heydenreich (GER)	Klára Kneblová (CZE)
2024 Liptovský Mikuláš	Yang Ting (CHN)	Léna Quémérais (FRA)	Valentýna Kočířová (CZE)
2025 Foix	Markéta Štěpánková (CZE)	Neele Krech (GER)	Zoe Blythe-Shields (GBR)
2026 Kraków	Barbora Ondráčková (CZE)	Valentýna Kočířová (CZE)	Margot Lapeze (FRA)

=== Kayak (K1) Women ===
Championships	Gold	Silver	Bronze
1986 Spittal	Anouk Loubie (FRA)	Anita Schirmer (FRG)	Heather Corrie (GBR)
1988 La Seu d'Urgell	Sandra Berger (FRG)	Lara Tipper (GBR)	Katja Sosnowski (FRG)
1990 Tavanasa	Angela Radermacher (FRG)	Irena Pavelková (TCH)	Urša Breznik (YUG)
1992 Sjoa	Cristina Giai Pron (ITA)	Claudia Heiz (SUI)	Irena Pavelková (TCH)
1994 Wausau	Stanislava Kováčová (SVK)	Diane Woods (GBR)	Veronika Řihošková (CZE)
1996 Lipno	Helen Reeves (GBR)	Vanda Semerádová (CZE)	Gabriela Stacherová (SVK)
1998 Lofer	Hana Pešková (CZE)	Claudia Bär (GER)	Kimberley Walsh (GBR)
2000 Bratislava	Jennifer Bongardt (GER)	Nina Mozetič (SLO)	Fiona Pennie (GBR)
2002 Nowy Sącz	Katharina Volke (GER)	Kateřina Hošková (CZE)	Dorothée Utz (GER)
2004 Lofer	Jasmin Schornberg (GER)	Melanie Pfeifer (GER)	Petra Slováková (CZE)
2006 Solkan	Urša Kragelj (SLO)	Jacqueline Horn (GER)	Carolin Schlumprecht (GER)
2008 Roudnice nad Labem	Eva Terčelj (SLO)	Stefanie Horn (GER)	Kateřina Kudějová (CZE)
2010 Foix	Jessica Fox (AUS)	Karolína Galušková (CZE)	Eva Terčelj (SLO)
2012 Wausau	Jessica Fox (AUS)	Karolína Galušková (CZE)	Viktoria Wolffhardt (AUT)
2013 Liptovský Mikuláš	Amálie Hilgertová (CZE)	Kimberley Woods (GBR)	Camille Prigent (FRA)
2014 Penrith	Ana Sátila (BRA)	Kate Eckhardt (AUS)	Paulína Matulániová (SVK)
2015 Foz do Iguaçu	Michaela Haššová (SVK)	Elena Apel (GER)	Camille Prigent (FRA)
2016 Kraków	Klaudia Zwolińska (POL)	Laia Sorribes (ESP)	Antonie Galušková (CZE)
2017 Bratislava	Antonie Galušková (CZE)	Eliška Mintálová (SVK)	Lucie Nesnídalová (CZE)
2018 Ivrea	Eva Alina Hočevar (SLO)	Soňa Stanovská (SVK)	Naemi Brändle (SUI)
2019 Kraków	Antonie Galušková (CZE)	Eva Alina Hočevar (SLO)	Evy Leibfarth (USA)
2021 Tacen	Evy Leibfarth (USA)	Emma Vuitton (FRA)	Zuzana Paňková (SVK)
2022 Ivrea	Lucia Pistoni (ITA)	Dominika Brzeska (POL)	Paulina Pirro (GER)
2023 Kraków	Bára Galušková (CZE)	Klára Kneblová (CZE)	Paulina Pirro (GER)
2024 Liptovský Mikuláš	Klára Mrázková (CZE)	Hanna Danek (POL)	Caterina Pignat (ITA)
2025 Foix	Hanna Danek (POL)	Barbora Ondráčková (CZE)	Mina Blume (GER)
2026 Kraków	Barbora Ondráčková (CZE)	Valentýna Kočířová (CZE)	Lucie Vaculová (CZE)

=== Kayak Cross Women ===
Championships	Gold	Silver	Bronze
2018 Ivrea	Kateřina Beková (CZE)	Alix Degremont (FRA)	River Mutton (NZL)
2019 Kraków	Evy Leibfarth (USA)	Antonia Oschmautz (AUT)	Kateřina Beková (CZE)
2021 Tacen	Jessica Duc (SUI)	Marina Novysh (RUS)	Tereza Kneblová (CZE)
2022 Ivrea	Evy Leibfarth (USA)	Zuzana Paňková (SVK)	Charlotte Wild (GER)
2023 Kraków	Klára Kneblová (CZE)	Nina Pesce-Roue (FRA)	Codie Davidson (AUS)
2024 Liptovský Mikuláš	Naja Pinterič (SLO)	Haizea Segura (ESP)	Codie Davidson (AUS)
2025 Foix	Mina Blume (GER)	Britta Jung (GER)	Ainara Goikoetxea (ESP)
2026 Kraków	Markéta Štěpánková (CZE)	Valentýna Kočířová (CZE)	Lucie Vaculová (CZE)

=== Kayak Cross Individual Women ===
Championships	Gold	Silver	Bronze
2025 Foix	Anna Simona (ESP)	Arina Kontchakov (GBR)	Britta Jung (GER)
2026 Kraków	Lucie Vaculová (CZE)	Carden Oetting (USA)	Valentýna Kočířová (CZE)

=== Canoe Double (C2) Mixed ===
Championships	Gold	Silver	Bronze
2018 Ivrea	Elena Micozzi/Flavio Micozzi (ITA)	Jules Bernardet/Doriane Delassus (FRA)	Ainhoa Lameiro/Pau Echaniz (ESP)
2019 Kraków	Tereza Kneblová/Martin Kratochvíl (CZE)	Daniel Urban/Ivana Kloboučková (CZE)	Zuzanna Kulig/Kacper Zachwieja (POL)
2021 Tacen (non-medal event)	Marina Novysh/Dmitrii Shestakov (RUS)	Wojciech Fabijański/Alicja Bulera (POL)	Valentina Vybornova/Sergei Smirnov (RUS)

== Teams ==
=== Canoe Single (C1) Men Teams ===
Championships	Gold	Silver	Bronze
1990 Tavanasa	France; Patrice Estanguet; David Gemmi; Benoît Guiraud	Yugoslavia; Simon Hočevar; Danko Herceg; Jaka Marušič	West Germany; Manfred Reinig; André Ehrenberg; Vitus Husek
1992 Sjoa	Poland; Grzegorz Sierota; Mariusz Wieczorek; Krzysztof Bieryt	Czechoslovakia; David Jančar; Pavel Janda; Jan Růžička	Slovenia; Simon Hočevar; Dejan Stevanovič; Matej Hočevar
1994 Wausau	Czech Republic; Pavel Janda; Stanislav Ježek; Tomáš Indruch	France; Cedric Legal; Tony Estanguet; Luc Lalubie	Germany; Andreas Krohn; Steffen Conradt; Gerit Hönicke
1996 Lipno	Czech Republic; Jan Mašek; Jan Pytelka; Martin Vlk	Slovakia; Stanislav Gejdoš; Michal Martikán; Dušan Ovčarík	France; Ronan Betrom; Tony Estanguet; Eric Labarelle
1998 Lofer	Germany; Stefan Pfannmöller; Achim Heib; Nico Bettge	Slovenia; Janez Korenjak; Primož Gabrijelčič; Anže Buh	France; Nicolas Noël; Nicolas Lepretre; Jérôme Legall
2000 Bratislava	Poland; Grzegorz Wójs; Krzysztof Supowicz; Grzegorz Kiljanek	France; Pierre Labarelle; Hervé Chevrier; Nicolas Peschier	Czech Republic; Přemysl Vlk; David Chod; Václav Hradilek
2002 Nowy Sącz	Poland; Krzysztof Supowicz; Grzegorz Kiljanek; Jarosław Chwastowicz	Germany; Lukas Hoffmann; Timo Wirsching; Vitali Zirka	Slovakia; Tomáš Kučera; Peter Hajdu; Ján Bátik
2004 Lofer	Czech Republic; Petr Karásek; Michal Jáně; Matěj Suchý	Slovakia; Peter Hajdu; Matej Beňuš; Ján Bátik	Germany; André Kiesslich; Stephan Borchert; Martin Unger
2006 Solkan	Germany; Sideris Tasiadis; Pascal Neibecker; Marcus Mehnert	Poland; Grzegorz Hedwig; Piotr Szczepański; Dawid Bartos	Great Britain; Greg Pitt; Mark Proctor; Peter Hall
2008 Roudnice nad Labem	Slovenia; Anže Berčič; Jure Lenarčič; Jernej Zupan	Czech Republic; Jiří Herink; František Jordán; Martin Říha	Germany; Sideris Tasiadis; Christian Scholz; Alexander Funk
2010 Foix	Great Britain; Adam Burgess; Ryan Westley; George Tatchell	Poland; Kacper Gondek; Wojciech Pasiut; Igor Sztuba	Czech Republic; Martin Říha; Radim Božek; Michal Pešek
2012 Wausau	France; Cédric Joly; Jason Brothier; Jean Freri	Great Britain; Samuel Ibbotson; Thomas Abbott; Andrew Houston	Russia; Alexander Ovchinikov; Yuri Snegirev; Pavel Smirnov
2013 Liptovský Mikuláš	Slovakia; Marko Gurečka; Tomáš Džurný; Martin Mračna	Germany; Florian Breuer; Philipp Reichenbach; Willi Braune	France; Cédric Joly; Julian Othenin-Girard; Erwan Marchais
2014 Penrith	Slovakia; Marko Gurečka; Marko Mirgorodský; Martin Mračna	Czech Republic; Václav Chaloupka; Tomáš Heger; Roman Matula	Spain; Luis Fernández; Jesus Cid; Jordi Tebé
2015 Foz do Iguaçu	Germany; Florian Breuer; Leon Hanika; Lennard Tuchscherer	Poland; Kacper Sztuba; Przemysław Nowak; Dominik Janur	Czech Republic; Václav Chaloupka; Tomáš Heger; Matyáš Lhota
2016 Kraków	Germany; Gregor Kreul; Lennard Tuchscherer; Paul Seumel	Russia; Pavel Kotov; Dmitrii Khramtsov; Mikhail Kruglov	France; Nicolas Gestin; Theo Roisin; Valentin Marteil
2017 Bratislava	Czech Republic; Vojtěch Heger; Matyáš Lhota; Jan Kaminský	Spain; Miquel Travé; David Burgos; Pau Echaniz	France; Theo Roisin; Alexis Bobon; Anthony Roux
2018 Ivrea	France; Nicolas Gestin; Jules Bernardet; Alexis Bobon	Czech Republic; Vojtěch Heger; Petr Novotný; Eduard Lerch	Slovenia; Urh Turnšek; Nejc Polenčič; Jaka Bernat
2019 Kraków	France; Yohann Senechault; Adrien Fischer; Hector Combes	Germany; Benjamin Kies; Julian Lindolf; Felix Göttling	Great Britain; Kurts Rozentals; James Kettle; Alfie Boote
2021 Tacen	Czech Republic; Adam Král; Martin Kratochvíl; Matyáš Říha	France; Mewen Debliquy; Quentin Maillefer; Tanguy Adisson	Germany; Benjamin Kies; Konrad Ginzel; Franz Gosse
2022 Ivrea	Spain; Markel Imaz; Marc Vicente; Alex Segura	France; Martin Cornu; Quentin Maillefer; Clément Brotier	Germany; Franz Gosse; Louis Paaschen; Ben Borrmann
2023 Kraków	Czech Republic; Lukáš Kratochvíl; Tomáš Větrovský; Filip Jiras	Germany; Ben Borrmann; Felix Sachers; Niels Zimmermann	France; Martin Cornu; Elouan Debliquy; Titouan Estanguet
2024 Liptovský Mikuláš	France; Martin Cornu; Elouan Debliquy; Titouan Estanguet	Germany; Felix Sachers; Niels Zimmermann; Anton Weber	Czech Republic; Jonáš Heger; Jakub Voneš; Vojtěch Malý
2025 Foix	France; Léo Ulmer; Titouan Estanguet; Mathéo Senechault	Spain; Oier Díaz; Oihan Deus; Jan Vicente	Czech Republic; Jakub Voneš; Jáchym Hanzel; Dominik Řežábek
2026 Kraków	Czech Republic; Dominik Řežábek; Jáchym Hanzel; Tomáš Indruch	Italy; Riccardo Pontarollo; Dennis Fina; Lars Aaron Senoner	France; Léo Royé; Cyrian Menuat; Théo Chetoui

=== Canoe Double (C2) Men Teams ===
Discontinued: 2016.

Championships	Gold	Silver	Bronze
1994 Wausau (non-medal event)	Czech Republic; Jan Jireš/Štěpán Chromovský; Václav Šmíd/Vladimír Buchnar; Jaroslav Volf/Ondřej Štěpánek	Slovakia; Milan Kubáň/Marián Olejník; Ľuboš Šoška/Peter Šoška; Peter Kvašňovský/Martin Kostek	Germany; Manuel Dosal/Eduardo Nieto; Johannes Lienemann/Tim Wallraff; Switzerland; Raoul Brodmann/Markus Zürcher
1996 Lipno	Czech Republic; Martin Rasner/Jan Hošek; Jan Rieger/Tomáš Buchnar; Jaroslav Volf/Ondřej Štěpánek	Poland; Konrad Korzeniewski/Jarosław Nawrocki; Krzysztof Nosal/Marek Kowalczyk; Andrzej Wójs/Sławomir Mordarski	France; Anthony Colin/Mickaël Sabelle; Gauthier Gonseth/Maxime Vallin; Sebastien Paolacci/Alexandre Martins
2000 Bratislava	France; Martin Braud/Cédric Forgit; Julien Gaspard/Remy Gaspard; Guillaume Brahic/Christian Brunel	Germany; Felix Michel/Sebastian Piersig; Karsten Möller/Enrico Scherzer; Philipp Bergner/David Schröder	Czech Republic; Jan Merenus/Ladislav Bouška; Martin Hammer/Ladislav Vlček; Zdeněk Pivoňka/Pavel Arnošt
2002 Nowy Sącz	Germany; Felix Michel/Sebastian Piersig; David Schröder/Philipp Bergner; Tim Welsink/Michael Junge	Poland; Paweł Sarna/Marcin Pochwała; Michał Kozial/Jakub Sierota; Maciej Sekula/Michał Stępniak	Slovakia; Pavol Kabzan/Peter Kabzan; Miroslav Hudec/Lukáš Hudec; Martin Medveď/Juraj Štoder
2004 Lofer (non-medal event)	Germany; Michael Bartsch/Michael Wiedemann; Kai Müller/Kevin Müller; Julius Schröder/Benno Schilling	Czech Republic; Milan Pořádek/Oldřich Weber; Viktor Božek/David Jančálek; Tomáš Koplík/Jakub Vrzáň	Slovakia; Martin Medveď/Juraj Štoder; Lukáš Hudec/Miroslav Hudec; Ján Šácha/Jakub Luley
2006 Solkan	France; Hugo Biso/Pierre Picco; Yoan Del Rey/Arthur Grandemange; Jeff Mouroux/Cyril Barbier	Czech Republic; Robert Gotvald/Jan Vlček; Ondřej Karlovský/Jakub Jáně; Daniel Kopťák/Marcel Postřímovský	Slovenia; Luka Božič/Sašo Taljat; Jure Janežič/Anže Janežič; Luka Slapšak/Blaž Oven
2008 Roudnice nad Labem	Czech Republic; Robert Gotvald/Jan Vlček; Jonáš Kašpar/Marek Šindler; Ondřej Karlovský/Jakub Jáně	Germany; Simon Auerbach/Florian Schubert; Holger Gerdes/Jan-Phillip Eckert; Thomas Becker/Robert Behling	Poland; Wojciech Pasiut/Kacper Gondek; Patryk Brzeziński/Dariusz Chlebek; Andrzej Poparda/Kamil Gondek
2010 Foix	Germany; Jan Michael Müller/Marcel Prinz; Michel Kerstan/Ansgar Oltmanns; Tom Lorke/Max Gerth	Czech Republic; Martin Říha/Jaroslav Strnad; Jakub Hojda/Tomáš Macášek; Ludvík Medřický/Matyáš Ebel	Russia; Ilia Shaydurov/Roman Stepanov; Pavel Kovalkov/Artem Bogdanov; Pavel Slezin/Ilya Gryzlov
2012 Wausau (non-medal event)	Czech Republic; Lukáš Rohan/Adam Svoboda; Radek Pospíchal/Marek Cepek; Jan Raška/Matěj Šiman	Great Britain; Samuel Ibbotson/Daniel Evans; Michael Brown/Andrew Houston; Thomas Abbott/Richard Booth	-
2013 Liptovský Mikuláš	Slovakia; Matúš Gewissler/Juraj Skákala; Martin Šimičák/Jakub Skubík; Igor Michalovič/Jakub Tomko	Poland; Jakub Brzeziński/Adam Kozub; Wojciech Klata/Krzysztof Zych; Kacper Ćwik/Dominik Janur	Germany; Hans Krüger/Paul Sommer; Aaron Jüttner/Piet Lennart Wagner; Florian Beste/Sören Loos
2015 Foz do Iguaçu (non-medal event)	Czech Republic; Michael Matějka/Jan Větrovský; Albert Kašpar/Vojtěch Mrůzek; Jan Mrázek/Tomáš Rousek	Germany; Niklas Hecht/Alexander Weber; Fritz Lehrach/Lennard Tuchscherer; Florian Breuer/Thomas Strauss	Brazil; Maicon de Borba/Carlos Moraes; Welton De Carvalho/Wallan De Carvalho; Kauã da Silva/Carlos Aparecido Motta
2016 Kraków (non-medal event)	Czech Republic; Albert Kašpar/Vojtěch Mrůzek; Jan Vrublovský/Petr Novotný; Vojtěch Heger/Tomáš Heger	Germany; Lennard Tuchscherer/Fritz Lehrach; Eric Borrmann/Leo Braune; Paul Seumel/Hannes Seumel	Poland; Jakub Brzeziński/Kacper Sztuba; Krzysztof Zych/Wojciech Klata; Marcin Janur/Artur Kolat

=== Kayak (K1) Men Teams ===
Championships	Gold	Silver	Bronze
1990 Tavanasa	West Germany; Lutz Jogwer; Oliver Fix; Mark Haverkamp	Czechoslovakia; Ondřej Raab; Jiří Prskavec; Alexandr Adámek	Yugoslavia; Jure Pelegrini; Miha Štricelj; Andraž Vehovar
1992 Sjoa	Slovenia; Miha Štricelj; Dejan Kralj; Uroš Kodelja	United States; Brent Wiesel; John Eric Southwick; John Trujillo	France; Jean-Yves Cheutin; Yann Le Pennec; Thierry Cadene
1994 Wausau	Slovenia; Aleš Kuder; Rok Kodelja; Dejan Kralj	United States; Kyle Elliott; Josh Russell; Scott Parsons	Germany; Ralf Schaberg; Thomas Schmidt; Christoph Erber
1996 Lipno	Czech Republic; Tomáš Kobes; Jan Kratochvíl; Ivan Pišvejc	Germany; Fabian Bär; Christoph Erber; Claus Suchanek	Slovenia; Miha Brezigar; Vasja Kavs; Miha Terdič
1998 Lofer	Germany; Jakobus Stenglein; Klaas Pannewig; Rene Mühlmann	Switzerland; Michael Kurt; Sami Bohnenblust; Thomas Mosimann	France; Benoît Peschier; Fabien Lefèvre; Julien Billaut
2000 Bratislava	Slovenia; Gregor Laznik; Peter Kauzer; Žiga Ovčak	Poland; Piotr Mędoń; Jakub Małecki; Przemysław Popis	Czech Republic; Jindřich Beneš; Vladimír Pour; Lukáš Kubričan
2002 Nowy Sącz	Czech Republic; Lukáš Kubričan; Jindřich Beneš; Michal Buchtel	Germany; Erik Pfannmöller; Stephan Pfeiffer; Alexander Grimm	France; Camille Bernis; Benoît Lepage; Pierre Bourliaud
2004 Lofer	France; Michael Guyon; Boris Neveu; Samuel Hernanz	Germany; Paul Böckelmann; Domenik Bartsch; Alexander Grimm	Czech Republic; Michal Buchtel; Vavřinec Hradilek; Luboš Hilgert
2006 Solkan	Germany; Sebastian Schubert; Lukas Kalkbrenner; Hannes Aigner	Czech Republic; Jan Vondra; Vít Přindiš; Tomáš Maslaňák	France; Lucien Delfour; Quentin Bove; Benoît Guillaume
2008 Roudnice nad Labem	France; Thomas Rosset; Benjamin Renia; Vivien Colober	Poland; Chrystian Półchłopek; Rafał Polaczyk; Michał Pasiut	Slovakia; Filip Machaj; Michal Bárta; Martin Halčin
2010 Foix	Germany; Laurenz Laugwitz; Fabian Schweikert; Fabian Schüssler	France; Quentin Burgi; Bryan Seiler; Quentin de Fierville	Czech Republic; Jiří Prskavec; Jaroslav Strnad; Ondřej Cvikl
2012 Wausau	Slovenia; Martin Srabotnik; Vid Karner; Rok Markočič	Australia; Timothy Anderson; Andrew Eckhardt; Daniel Watkins	Germany; Stefan Hengst; Samuel Hegge; Timon Lutz
2013 Liptovský Mikuláš	France; Bastien Damiens; Mathys Huvelin; Quentin Mignard	Slovakia; Jakub Grigar; Andrej Málek; Peter Blasbalg	Slovenia; Martin Srabotnik; Vid Karner; Vid Kuder Marušič
2014 Penrith	Czech Republic; Pavel Šupolík; Petr Šodek; Tomáš Rousek	Spain; David Llorente; Unai Nabaskues; Jordi Cadena	Great Britain; Zachary Allin; Austin Barker; Christopher Bowers
2015 Foz do Iguaçu	France; Guillaume Graille; Pierre Hellard; Malo Quéméneur	Spain; Jordi Cadena; Eneko Auzmendi; Nil García	Germany; Lukas Stahl; Thomas Strauss; Niklas Hecht
2016 Kraków	France; Thomas Durand; Paul Cornut-Chauvinc; Malo Quéméneur	Germany; Thomas Strauss; Noah Hegge; Lukas Stahl	Czech Republic; Tomáš Zima; Jan Mrázek; Vilém Kořínek
2017 Bratislava	Germany; Lukas Stahl; Noah Hegge; Janosch Unseld	Spain; Pau Echaniz; Eneko Auzmendi; Miquel Travé	Czech Republic; Tomáš Zima; Josef Žížala; Jan Bárta
2018 Ivrea	France; Julien Pajaud; Vincent Delahaye; Anatole Delassus	Czech Republic; Tomáš Zima; Jakub Krejčí; Jan Bárta	Germany; Tim Bremer; Joshua Dietz; Maximilian Dilli
2019 Kraków	Great Britain; Jonny Dickson; Ben Haylett; Etienne Chappell	Czech Republic; Jakub Krejčí; Jakub Mrázek; Martin Rudorfer	Germany; Maximilian Dilli; Paul Bretzinger; Tillmann Röller
2021 Tacen	Slovenia; Jan Ločnikar; Urban Gajšek; Jakob Šavli	Czech Republic; Martin Rudorfer; Matyáš Novák; Jakub Mrázek	France; Oskar Hillion; Titouan Castryck; Edouard Chenal
2022 Ivrea	Slovakia; Ondrej Macúš; Richard Rumanský; Filip Stanko	France; Titouan Castryck; Hugo Monasse; Théo Reby	Great Britain; Sam Leaver; Edward McDonald; Oscar Wyllie
2023 Kraków	Germany; Enrico Dietz; Christian Stanzel; Erik Sprotowsky	France; Martin Cornu; Ianis Triomphe; Edgar Paleau-Brasseur	Czech Republic; Matyáš Novák; Marek Bízek; Michal Kopeček
2024 Liptovský Mikuláš	France; Martin Cornu; Elouan Debliquy; Titouan Estanguet	Italy; Michele Pistoni; Andrea Nardo; Nicola Pistoni	Germany; David Becke; Luis Hartmann; Felix Sachers
2025 Foix	Slovenia; Žiga Lin Hočevar; Tadej Tilinger; Tjas Velikonja	Czech Republic; Michal Kopeček; Jáchym Fröhlich; Martin Panzer	Spain; Faust Clotet Juanmarti; Oier Díaz; Dídac Foz
2026 Kraków	Slovenia; Tadej Tilinger; Jan Jančar; Svit Konrad	France; Théo Chetoui; Liam Le Touze; Léo Royé	Slovakia; Dominik Egyházy; Filip Duda; Matúš Egyházy

=== Canoe Single (C1) Women Teams ===
Championships	Gold	Silver	Bronze
2012 Wausau (non-medal event)	Australia; Margaret Webster; Erin McGilvray; Georgia Rankin	-	-
2013 Liptovský Mikuláš	Australia; Noemie Fox; Georgia Rankin; Alexandra Broome	Germany; Karolin Wagner; Birgit Ohmayer; Kira Kubbe	Great Britain; Kimberley Woods; Eilidh Gibson; Rachel Houston
2014 Penrith (non-medal event)	Czech Republic; Martina Satková; Anna Koblencová; Jana Matulková	Australia; Noemie Fox; Kate Eckhardt; Alexandra Broome	France; Lucie Prioux; Margaux Henry; Camille Prigent
2015 Foz do Iguaçu (non-medal event)	Germany; Andrea Herzog; Birgit Ohmayer; Elena Apel	Czech Republic; Martina Satková; Eva Říhová; Tereza Fišerová	Australia; Noemie Fox; Kate Eckhardt; Demelza Wall
2016 Kraków	Russia; Alsu Minazova; Anastasia Kozyreva; Daria Shaidurova	Slovakia; Simona Glejteková; Soňa Stanovská; Simona Maceková	France; Marjorie Delassus; Fanchon Janssen; Azénor Philip
2017 Bratislava	Germany; Andrea Herzog; Lena Holl; Zoe Jakob	Slovakia; Monika Škáchová; Simona Glejteková; Soňa Stanovská	Czech Republic; Eva Říhová; Gabriela Satková; Alexandra Vrbová
2018 Ivrea	Czech Republic; Gabriela Satková; Tereza Kneblová; Eva Říhová	Great Britain; Bethan Forrow; Ellis Miller; Daisy Cooil	France; Laurène Roisin; Doriane Delassus; Angèle Hug
2019 Kraków	Italy; Marta Bertoncelli; Elena Borghi; Elena Micozzi	Slovakia; Emanuela Luknárová; Ivana Chlebová; Zuzana Paňková	Czech Republic; Gabriela Satková; Tereza Kneblová; Adéla Králová
2021 Tacen	Czech Republic; Tereza Kneblová; Klára Kneblová; Lucie Doležalová	Germany; Paulina Pirro; Lucie Krech; Zola Lewandowski	Slovakia; Zuzana Paňková; Ivana Chlebová; Ema Diešková
2022 Ivrea	Czech Republic; Klára Kneblová; Adriana Morenová; Olga Samková	Germany; Lucie Krech; Lena Götze; Kimberley Rappe	Slovakia; Zuzana Paňková; Petronela Ižová; Ema Diešková
2023 Kraków	Czech Republic; Klára Kneblová; Valentýna Kočířová; Natálie Erlová	Slovenia; Naja Pinterič; Ema Lampič; Asja Jug	Germany; Paulina Pirro; Christin Heydenreich; Neele Krech
2024 Liptovský Mikuláš	Czech Republic; Valentýna Kočířová; Markéta Štěpánková; Natálie Erlová	France; Léna Quémérais; Camille Brugvin; Margot Lapeze	Germany; Neele Krech; Christin Heydenreich; Carolin Diemer
2025 Foix	Czech Republic; Valentýna Kočířová; Markéta Štěpánková; Barbora Ondráčková	Great Britain; Zoe Blythe-Shields; Darcey McMullins; Jasmine Wilde	Switzerland; Eyleen Vuilleumier; Leni Uffer; Florance Moinian
2026 Kraków	Czech Republic; Markéta Štěpánková; Valentýna Kočířová; Barbora Ondráčková	France; Lili Ulmer; Margot Lapeze; Laurette Laly	United States; Carden Oetting; Ivy Lenz; Lucy Crino

=== Kayak (K1) Women Teams ===
Championships	Gold	Silver	Bronze
1990 Tavanasa	West Germany; Evi Huss; Angela Radermacher; Susanne Hirt	Czechoslovakia; Petra Plavjaniková; Elena Kaliská; Irena Pavelková	Spain; María Eizmendi; Cristina Martínez; Arene Leizaola
1992 Sjoa	Czechoslovakia; Irena Pavelková; Petra Plavjaniková; Petra Koudelová	Germany; Evi Huss; Mandy Planert; Phillis Ahlfaenger	Canada; Ina Kerckhoff; Saskia van Mourik; Jennifer Gratto
1994 Wausau	Czech Republic; Michala Říhová; Vanda Semerádová; Veronika Řihošková	Germany; Phillis Ahlfaenger; Diana Hildebrandt; Hella Pannewig	France; Anais Tharaud; Chantal Gerbet; Annaig Pedrono
1996 Lipno	Czech Republic; Barbora Jirková; Hana Pešková; Vanda Semerádová	Slovakia; Blanka Lejsalová; Kristýna Mrázová; Gabriela Stacherová	France; Marie Gaspard; Stephanie Kaczmarek; Anne-Line Poncet
1998 Lofer	Czech Republic; Hana Pešková; Marie Řihošková; Petra Semerádová	Germany; Jennifer Bongardt; Claudia Bär; Iris Gebhard	United States; Hannah Larsen; Aleta Miller; Anna Jorgensen
2000 Bratislava	Germany; Jennifer Bongardt; Melanie Gelbhaar; Anna Kamps	Slovakia; Janka Ovčariková; Jana Dukátová; Dana Beňušová	Great Britain; Fiona Pennie; Sarah Kinder; Debbie Lomas
2002 Nowy Sącz	Germany; Jasmin Schornberg; Katharina Volke; Dorothée Utz	Czech Republic; Kateřina Hošková; Šárka Smejkalová; Petra Slováková	Poland; Małgorzata Milczarek; Elżbieta Kin; Alicja Dudek
2004 Lofer	Germany; Melanie Pfeifer; Jasmin Schornberg; Dorothée Utz	Czech Republic; Šárka Blažková; Zuzana Vybíralová; Petra Slováková	Great Britain; Heather Caesar; Lizzie Neave; Julie Bright
2006 Solkan	Germany; Michaela Grimm; Carolin Schlumprecht; Jacqueline Horn	Czech Republic; Kateřina Kudějová; Anna Dandová; Miroslava Urbanová	France; Laura Mangin; Claire Jacquet; Caroline Loir
2008 Roudnice nad Labem	Czech Republic; Anna Bustová; Veronika Vojtová; Kateřina Kudějová	France; Lea Martin; Nouria Newman; Estelle Mangin	Germany; Anne Rosentreter; Stefanie Horn; Ricarda Funk
2010 Foix	Great Britain; Natalie Wilson; Bethan Latham; Emily Woodcock	Germany; Ricarda Funk; Caroline Trompeter; Lisa Fritsche	Czech Republic; Karolína Galušková; Anna Bustová; Pavlína Zástěrová
2012 Wausau	Great Britain; Kimberley Woods; Mallory Franklin; Alice Haining	Germany; Caroline Trompeter; Rebecca Plonka; Anna Faber	Czech Republic; Karolína Galušková; Barbora Valíková; Sabina Foltysová
2013 Liptovský Mikuláš	Czech Republic; Karolína Galušková; Amálie Hilgertová; Tereza Fišerová	Germany; Anna Faber; Selina Jones; Ann-Kathrin Schwanholt	Slovenia; Neža Vrevc; Nina Bizjak; Alja Kozorog
2014 Penrith	Czech Republic; Sabina Foltysová; Amálie Hilgertová; Tereza Fišerová	Spain; Miren Lazkano; Klara Olazabal; Irene Egües	France; Camille Prigent; Margaux Henry; Claire Gaigeot
2015 Foz do Iguaçu	Czech Republic; Tereza Fišerová; Amálie Hilgertová; Eva Říhová	Germany; Selina Jones; Elena Apel; Andrea Herzog	Australia; Noemie Fox; Kate Eckhardt; Georgina Collin
2016 Kraków	Czech Republic; Tereza Fišerová; Antonie Galušková; Kateřina Dušková	France; Romane Prigent; Fanchon Janssen; Léa Turmeau	Poland; Klaudia Zwolińska; Sara Ćwik; Kinga Czernek
2017 Bratislava	Germany; Andrea Herzog; Lena Holl; Stella Mehlhorn	France; Romane Prigent; Anais Bernardy; Fanchon Janssen	Slovakia; Eliška Mintálová; Soňa Stanovská; Silvia Brosová
2018 Ivrea	Czech Republic; Antonie Galušková; Lucie Nesnídalová; Kateřina Beková	Slovenia; Eva Alina Hočevar; Lea Novak; Sara Belingar	Italy; Francesca Malaguti; Marta Bertoncelli; Elena Borghi
2019 Kraków	France; Emma Vuitton; Doriane Delassus; Eva Pietracha	Czech Republic; Antonie Galušková; Lucie Nesnídalová; Kateřina Beková	Great Britain; Lois Leaver; Ellis Miller; Bethan Forrow
2021 Tacen	Germany; Hannah Süss; Paulina Pirro; Lucie Krech	Czech Republic; Klára Kneblová; Tereza Kneblová; Amélie Červenková	Slovenia; Helena Domajnko; Sara Belingar; Ula Skok
2022 Ivrea	Czech Republic; Klára Kneblová; Kateřina Švehlová; Olga Samková	Slovakia; Zuzana Paňková; Petronela Ižová; Lucia Simonidesová	Spain; Leire Goñi; Haizea Segura; Maite Odriozola
2023 Kraków	Czech Republic; Klára Kneblová; Klára Mrázková; Bára Galušková	Germany; Paulina Pirro; Charlotte Wild; Christin Heydenreich	Slovenia; Naja Pinterič; Ula Skok; Neja Velišček
2024 Liptovský Mikuláš	Czech Republic; Bára Galušková; Markéta Hojdová; Klára Mrázková	Germany; Nova Müller; Mina Blume; Christin Heydenreich	France; Léna Quémérais; Camille Brugvin; Camille Vuitton
2025 Foix	Czech Republic; Markéta Hojdová; Anna Fabianová; Barbora Ondráčková	Great Britain; Zoe Blythe-Shields; Arina Kontchakov; Sofia Alfer	France; Margot Lapeze; Suzanne Brossard; Judith Locatelli
2026 Kraków	Czech Republic; Barbora Ondráčková; Valentýna Kočířová; Lucie Vaculová	Germany; Nova Müller; Neele Krech; Britta Jung	Slovakia; Karolína Abrahámová; Zara Záhorská; Petra Šošková
