= 2004 World Junior Canoe Slalom Championships =

The 2004 ICF World Junior Canoe Slalom Championships were the 10th edition of the ICF World Junior Canoe Slalom Championships. The event took place in Lofer, Austria from 3 to 4 July 2004 under the auspices of the International Canoe Federation (ICF).

No medals were awarded for the C2 event and the C2 team event due to not meeting the minimum participation criteria according to ICF. The C2 event only had participants from 2 continents (3 were required), while the C2 team event only had 5 teams participating (6 were required).

== Medal summary ==
=== Men ===
==== Canoe ====
Event	Gold	Points	Silver	Points	Bronze	Points
C1	Martin Unger (GER)	238.79	Matej Beňuš (SVK)	240.37	Christos Tsakmakis (GRE)	241.48
C1 team	Czech Republic; Petr Karásek; Michal Jáně; Matěj Suchý	255.77	Slovakia; Peter Hajdu; Matej Beňuš; Ján Bátik	266.43	Germany; André Kiesslich; Stephan Borchert; Martin Unger	268.25
C2 (non-medal event)	Michael Bartsch/Michael Wiedemann (GER)	249.63	Kai Müller/Kevin Müller (GER)	252.39	Aymeric Maynadier/Sébastien Perilhou (FRA)	256.61
C2 team (non-medal event)	Germany; Michael Bartsch/Michael Wiedemann; Kai Müller/Kevin Müller; Julius Schröder/Benno Schilling	287.51	Czech Republic; Milan Pořádek/Oldřich Weber; Viktor Božek/David Jančálek; Tomáš Koplík/Jakub Vrzáň	294.18	Slovakia; Martin Medveď/Juraj Štoder; Lukáš Hudec/Miroslav Hudec; Ján Šácha/Jakub Luley	298.20

==== Kayak ====
Event	Gold	Points	Silver	Points	Bronze	Points
K1	Alexander Grimm (GER)	224.24	Michal Buchtel (CZE)	224.35	Vavřinec Hradilek (CZE)	229.71
K1 team	France; Michael Guyon; Boris Neveu; Samuel Hernanz	239.94	Germany; Paul Böckelmann; Domenik Bartsch; Alexander Grimm	241.74	Czech Republic; Michal Buchtel; Vavřinec Hradilek; Luboš Hilgert	245.23

=== Women ===
==== Kayak ====
Event	Gold	Points	Silver	Points	Bronze	Points
K1	Jasmin Schornberg (GER)	255.43	Melanie Pfeifer (GER)	255.51	Petra Slováková (CZE)	257.53
K1 team	Germany; Melanie Pfeifer; Jasmin Schornberg; Dorothée Utz	275.32	Czech Republic; Šárka Blažková; Zuzana Vybíralová; Petra Slováková	299.14	Great Britain; Heather Caesar; Lizzie Neave; Julie Bright	321.17

== Medal table ==
Rank	Nation	Gold	Silver	Bronze	Total
1	Germany (GER)	4	2	1	7
2	Czech Republic (CZE)	1	2	3	6
3	France (FRA)	1	0	0	1
4	Slovakia (SVK)	0	2	0	2
5	Great Britain (GBR)	0	0	1	1
5	Greece (GRE)	0	0	1	1
Totals (6 entries)		6	6	6	18
