= Felix Michel =

Felix Michel may refer to:

- Felix Michel (born 1984), German canoeist
- Felix Michel Melki (born 1994), Lebanese–Swedish footballer
- Félix-Michel Ngonge (born 1967), Congolese footballer
