= 2002 World Junior Canoe Slalom Championships =

The 2002 ICF World Junior Canoe Slalom Championships were the 9th edition of the ICF World Junior Canoe Slalom Championships. The event took place in Nowy Sącz, Poland from 9 to 11 August 2002 under the auspices of the International Canoe Federation (ICF).

Team Czech Republic was stripped of the bronze medal that they had won in the C2 team event due to a positive doping test of one its members. Slovakia was promoted to third place in the amended results.

== Medal summary ==
=== Men ===
==== Canoe ====
Event	Gold	Points	Silver	Points	Bronze	Points
C1	Timo Wirsching (GER)	218.66	Jarosław Chwastowicz (POL)	219.34	Lukas Hoffmann (GER)	219.63
C1 team	Poland; Krzysztof Supowicz; Grzegorz Kiljanek; Jarosław Chwastowicz	243.31	Germany; Lukas Hoffmann; Timo Wirsching; Vitali Zirka	253.20	Slovakia; Tomáš Kučera; Peter Hajdu; Ján Bátik	253.34
C2	Felix Michel/Sebastian Piersig (GER)	229.20	Marcin Pochwała/Paweł Sarna (POL)	233.88	Jakub Sierota/Michał Kozial (POL)	238.99
C2 team	Germany; Felix Michel/Sebastian Piersig; David Schröder/Philipp Bergner; Tim Welsink/Michael Junge	264.61	Poland; Paweł Sarna/Marcin Pochwała; Michał Kozial/Jakub Sierota; Maciej Sekula/Michał Stępniak	268.04	Slovakia; Pavol Kabzan/Peter Kabzan; Miroslav Hudec/Lukáš Hudec; Martin Medveď/Juraj Štoder	292.48

==== Kayak ====
Event	Gold	Points	Silver	Points	Bronze	Points
K1	Grzegorz Polaczyk (POL)	205.95	Lukáš Kubričan (CZE)	207.44	Daniele Molmenti (ITA)	207.52
K1 team	Czech Republic; Lukáš Kubričan; Jindřich Beneš; Michal Buchtel	229.66	Germany; Erik Pfannmöller; Stephan Pfeiffer; Alexander Grimm	239.82	France; Camille Bernis; Benoît Lepage; Pierre Bourliaud	243.38

=== Women ===
==== Kayak ====
Event	Gold	Points	Silver	Points	Bronze	Points
K1	Katharina Volke (GER)	227.44	Kateřina Hošková (CZE)	230.51	Dorothée Utz (GER)	231.47
K1 team	Germany; Jasmin Schornberg; Katharina Volke; Dorothée Utz	265.99	Czech Republic; Kateřina Hošková; Šárka Smejkalová; Petra Slováková	271.44	Poland; Małgorzata Milczarek; Elżbieta Kin; Alicja Dudek	282.90

== Medal table ==
Rank	Nation	Gold	Silver	Bronze	Total
1	Germany (GER)	5	2	2	9
2	Poland (POL)	2	3	2	7
3	Czech Republic (CZE)	1	3	0	4
4	Slovakia (SVK)	0	0	2	2
5	France (FRA)	0	0	1	1
5	Italy (ITA)	0	0	1	1
Totals (6 entries)		8	8	8	24
