= Ondřej Karlovský =

Czech slalom canoeist (born 1991)

Personal information
- Born: 10 July 1991 (age 35) Hradec Králové
Medal record
Men's canoe slalom
Representing Czech Republic
World Championships
Gold medal – first place	2013 Prague	C2 team
Bronze medal – third place	2014 Deep Creek Lake	C2 team
European Championships
Silver medal – second place	2012 Augsburg	C2 team
Silver medal – second place	2015 Markkleeberg	C2 team
Silver medal – second place	2018 Prague	C2 team
Bronze medal – third place	2013 Kraków	C2
Bronze medal – third place	2014 Vienna	C2 team
Bronze medal – third place	2017 Tacen	C2 team
Bronze medal – third place	2018 Prague	C2
U23 World Championships
Gold medal – first place	2012 Wausau	C2 team
Gold medal – first place	2013 Liptovský Mikuláš	C2 team
Silver medal – second place	2012 Wausau	C2
U23 European Championships
Gold medal – first place	2011 Banja Luka	C2 team
Silver medal – second place	2010 Markkleeberg	C2 team
Silver medal – second place	2011 Banja Luka	C2
Silver medal – second place	2012 Solkan	C2 team
Bronze medal – third place	2010 Markkleeberg	C2
Bronze medal – third place	2009 Liptovský Mikuláš	C2 team
Junior World Championships
Gold medal – first place	2008 Roudnice nad Labem	C2 team
Silver medal – second place	2006 Solkan	C2 team
Silver medal – second place	2008 Roudnice nad Labem	C2
Junior European Championships
Gold medal – first place	2008 Solkan	C2 team
Silver medal – second place	2008 Solkan	C2

Ondřej Karlovský (born 10 July 1991 in Hradec Králové) is a Czech slalom canoeist who has competed at the international level since 2006.

He won two medals in the C2 team event at the ICF Canoe Slalom World Championships with a gold in 2013 and a bronze in 2014. He also won three silver and four bronze medals at the European Canoe Slalom Championships.

His partner in the C2 boat is Jakub Jáně.

== World Cup individual podiums ==
Season	Date	Venue	Position	Event
2015	21 Jun 2015	Prague	2nd	C2
2016	4 Sep 2016	Prague	3rd	C2
