= 2008 World Junior Canoe Slalom Championships =

The 2008 ICF World Junior Canoe Slalom Championships were the 12th edition of the ICF World Junior Canoe Slalom Championships. The event took place in Roudnice nad Labem, Czech Republic from 25 to 27 July 2008 under the auspices of the International Canoe Federation (ICF).

== Medal summary ==
=== Men ===
==== Canoe ====
| Event | Gold | Points | Silver | Points | Bronze | Points |
|---|---|---|---|---|---|---|
| C1 | Sideris Tasiadis (GER) | 196.38 | Teng Zhiqiang (CHN) | 200.17 | Alexander Funk (GER) | 207.35 |
| C1 team | Slovenia; Anže Berčič; Jure Lenarčič; Jernej Zupan | 237.89 | Czech Republic; Jiří Herink; František Jordán; Martin Říha | 241.44 | Germany; Sideris Tasiadis; Christian Scholz; Alexander Funk | 241.66 |
| C2 | Robert Gotvald/Jan Vlček (CZE) | 229.73 | Ondřej Karlovský/Jakub Jáně (CZE) | 230.01 | Patryk Brzeziński/Dariusz Chlebek (POL) | 237.62 |
| C2 team | Czech Republic; Robert Gotvald/Jan Vlček; Jonáš Kašpar/Marek Šindler; Ondřej Karlovský/Jakub Jáně | 250.36 | Germany; Simon Auerbach/Florian Schubert; Holger Gerdes/Jan-Phillip Eckert; Thomas Becker/Robert Behling | 251.46 | Poland; Wojciech Pasiut/Kacper Gondek; Patryk Brzeziński/Dariusz Chlebek; Andrzej Poparda/Kamil Gondek | 261.36 |

==== Kayak ====
| Event | Gold | Points | Silver | Points | Bronze | Points |
|---|---|---|---|---|---|---|
| K1 | Martin Halčin (SVK) | 193.93 | Martin Albreht (SLO) | 194.19 | Benjamin Renia (FRA) | 195.12 |
| K1 team | France; Thomas Rosset; Benjamin Renia; Vivien Colober | 214.75 | Poland; Chrystian Półchłopek; Rafał Polaczyk; Michał Pasiut | 218.28 | Slovakia; Filip Machaj; Michal Bárta; Martin Halčin | 220.53 |

=== Women ===
==== Kayak ====
| Event | Gold | Points | Silver | Points | Bronze | Points |
|---|---|---|---|---|---|---|
| K1 | Eva Terčelj (SLO) | 220.19 | Stefanie Horn (GER) | 222.72 | Kateřina Kudějová (CZE) | 222.76 |
| K1 team | Czech Republic; Anna Bustová; Veronika Vojtová; Kateřina Kudějová | 259.28 | France; Lea Martin; Nouria Newman; Estelle Mangin | 263.31 | Germany; Anne Rosentreter; Stefanie Horn; Ricarda Funk | 272.22 |

== Medal table ==
| Rank | Nation | Gold | Silver | Bronze | Total |
|---|---|---|---|---|---|
| 1 | Czech Republic (CZE) | 3 | 2 | 1 | 6 |
| 2 | Slovenia (SLO) | 2 | 1 | 0 | 3 |
| 3 | Germany (GER) | 1 | 2 | 3 | 6 |
| 4 | France (FRA) | 1 | 1 | 1 | 3 |
| 5 | Slovakia (SVK) | 1 | 0 | 1 | 2 |
| 6 | Poland (POL) | 0 | 1 | 2 | 3 |
| 7 | China (CHN) | 0 | 1 | 0 | 1 |
| Totals (7 entries) | | 8 | 8 | 8 | 24 |
