= 2026 World Junior and U23 Canoe Slalom Championships =

International canoeing competition

- Venue: Kraków-Kolna Canoe Slalom Course
- Location: Kraków, Poland
- Dates: 30 June to 5 July

The 2026 ICF World Junior and U23 Canoe Slalom Championships took place in Kraków, Poland, from 30 June to 5 July 2026, under the auspices of the International Canoe Federation (ICF). It was the 27th edition of the competition for the Juniors (U18) and the 14th edition for the Under 23 category.

Kraków hosted the event for the 4th time after 2016, 2019 and 2023.

445 athletes from 51 countries participated in the event. A total of 24 medal events were contested.

== Medal summary ==
=== Junior ===
==== Men ====
===== Canoe =====
Event	Gold		Silver		Bronze	
C1	Dominik Egyházy; Slovakia	88.11	Dominik Řežábek; Czech Republic	91.97	Ioannis Zachos; Greece	96.80
C1 team	Czech Republic; Dominik Řežábek; Jáchym Hanzel; Tomáš Indruch	92.12	Italy; Riccardo Pontarollo; Dennis Fina; Lars Aaron Senoner	93.16	France; Léo Royé; Cyrian Menuat; Théo Chetoui	96.15

===== Kayak =====
Event	Gold		Silver		Bronze	
K1	Max Steinbrenner; Austria	86.75	Léo Royé; France	88.07	Marek Kulczycki; Poland	89.04
K1 team	Slovenia; Tadej Tilinger; Jan Jančar; Svit Konrad	89.15	France; Théo Chetoui; Liam Le Touze; Léo Royé	89.18	Slovakia; Dominik Egyházy; Filip Duda; Matúš Egyházy	89.28
Kayak cross	Marek Petřík; Czech Republic		Max Steinbrenner; Austria		Marek Kulczycki; Poland	
Kayak cross individual	Marek Kulczycki; Poland	55.98	Arkhyp Krachko; Ukraine	56.45	Tobiáš Novák; Czech Republic	56.75

==== Women ====
===== Canoe =====
Event	Gold		Silver		Bronze	
C1	Barbora Ondráčková; Czech Republic	106.22	Valentýna Kočířová; Czech Republic	108.62	Margot Lapeze; France	108.96
C1 team	Czech Republic; Markéta Štěpánková; Valentýna Kočířová; Barbora Ondráčková	109.75	France; Lili Ulmer; Margot Lapeze; Laurette Laly	121.08	United States; Carden Oetting; Ivy Lenz; Lucy Crino	122.75

===== Kayak =====
Event	Gold		Silver		Bronze	
K1	Barbora Ondráčková; Czech Republic	99.82	Valentýna Kočířová; Czech Republic	100.71	Lucie Vaculová; Czech Republic	102.20
K1 team	Czech Republic; Barbora Ondráčková; Valentýna Kočířová; Lucie Vaculová	96.93	Germany; Nova Müller; Neele Krech; Britta Jung	103.49	Slovakia; Karolína Abrahámová; Zara Záhorská; Petra Šošková	105.10
Kayak cross	Markéta Štěpánková; Czech Republic		Valentýna Kočířová; Czech Republic		Lucie Vaculová; Czech Republic	
Kayak cross individual	Lucie Vaculová; Czech Republic	61.89	Carden Oetting; United States	61.91	Valentýna Kočířová; Czech Republic	62.09

=== Under 23 ===
==== Men ====
===== Canoe =====
Event	Gold		Silver		Bronze	
C1	Mewen Debliquy; France	88.62	Lukáš Kratochvíl; Czech Republic	89.07	Elio Maiutto; Italy	91.50
C1 team	France; Martin Cornu; Mewen Debliquy; Titouan Estanguet	87.96	Czech Republic; Lukáš Kratochvíl; Adam Král; Martin Kratochvíl	89.58	Spain; Alex Segura; Oier Díaz; Marc Vicente	92.84

===== Kayak =====
Event	Gold		Silver		Bronze	
K1	Sam Leaver; Great Britain	84.12	Faust Clotet Juanmarti; Spain	84.26	Michele Pistoni; Italy	84.29
K1 team	France; Martin Cornu; Mewen Debliquy; Titouan Estanguet	85.39	Italy; Xabier Ferrazzi; Michele Pistoni; Gabriele Grimandi	86.20	Czech Republic; Matyáš Novák; Michal Kopeček; Martin Rudorfer	86.33
Kayak cross	Ianis Triomphe; France		Miquel Farran; Spain		Thomas Mayer; Great Britain	
Kayak cross individual	Enrico Dietz; Germany	53.56	Matyáš Novák; Czech Republic	53.59	Manel Contreras; Spain	54.38

==== Women ====
===== Canoe =====
Event	Gold		Silver		Bronze	
C1	Lucie Krech; Germany	103.71	Elena Micozzi; Italy	108.31	Wu Yishan; China	109.57
C1 team	Czech Republic; Tereza Kneblová; Adriana Morenová; Anna Fabianová	104.01	China; Liu Gaoyi; Xu Jiaqi; Wu Yishan	108.21	Italy; Elena Micozzi; Isabel Lovato; Vittoria Cuignon	110.85

===== Kayak =====
Event	Gold		Silver		Bronze	
K1	Paulina Pirro; Germany	93.08	Leire Goñi; Spain	94.15	Bára Galušková; Czech Republic	95.26
K1 team	Spain; Leire Goñi; Anna Simona; Haizea Segura	95.46	Germany; Paulina Pirro; Antonia Plochmann; Mina Blume	97.18	France; Ilona Martin Laemle; Nina Pesce-Roue; Camille Brugvin	100.10
Kayak cross	Tereza Kneblová; Czech Republic		Fia Bütikofer; Switzerland		Lucia Pistoni; Italy	
Kayak cross individual	Tereza Kneblová; Czech Republic	59.27	Leire Goñi; Spain	59.63	Dominika Brzeska; Poland	59.64

== Medal table ==
* Host nation (Poland)

Rank	Nation	Gold	Silver	Bronze	Total
1	Czech Republic (CZE)	11	7	6	24
2	France (FRA)	4	3	3	10
3	Germany (GER)	3	2	0	5
4	Spain (ESP)	1	4	2	7
5	Austria (AUT)	1	1	0	2
6	Poland (POL)*	1	0	3	4
7	Slovakia (SVK)	1	0	2	3
8	Great Britain (GBR)	1	0	1	2
9	Slovenia (SLO)	1	0	0	1
10	Italy (ITA)	0	3	4	7
11	China (CHN)	0	1	1	2
11	United States (USA)	0	1	1	2
13	Switzerland (SUI)	0	1	0	1
13	Ukraine (UKR)	0	1	0	1
15	Greece (GRE)	0	0	1	1
Totals (15 entries)		24	24	24	72
