= Andraž Vehovar =

Medal record

Men's canoe slalom

Representing Yugoslavia

Junior World Championships
Bronze medal – third place	1988 La Seu d'Urgell	K1
Bronze medal – third place	1990 Tavanasa	K1 team

Representing Slovenia

Olympic Games
Silver medal – second place	1996 Atlanta	K1

World Championships
Silver medal – second place	1995 Nottingham	K1 team
Silver medal – second place	1999 La Seu d'Urgell	K1 team

European Championships
Silver medal – second place	1996 Augsburg	K1 team
Bronze medal – third place	1998 Roudnice nad Labem	K1 team

Andraž Vehovar (born 1 March 1972 in Ljubljana) is a Yugoslav born, Slovenian slalom canoeist who competed at the international level from 1988 to 1999.

He won a silver medal in the K1 event at the 1996 Summer Olympics in Atlanta. Vehovar's efforts earned him the Slovenian Sportsman of the year award in 1996.

He also won two silver medals in the K1 team event at the ICF Canoe Slalom World Championships, earning them in 1995 and 1999. He also has a silver and a bronze medal from the same event from the European Championships.

== World Cup individual podiums ==
Season	Date	Venue	Position	Event
1995	25 Jun 1995	Prague	3rd	K1
1995	2 Jul 1995	Tacen	1st	K1
1998	21 Jun 1998	Tacen	2nd	K1
