= 2022 World Junior and U23 Canoe Slalom Championships =

- Venue: Ivrea Whitewater Stadium
- Location: Ivrea, Italy
- Dates: 5 to 10 July 2022

The 2022 ICF World Junior and U23 Canoe Slalom Championships took place in Ivrea, Italy, from 5 to 10 July 2022, under the auspices of the International Canoe Federation (ICF). It was the 23rd edition of the competition for Juniors (U18) and the 10th edition for the Under 23 category.

Russia and Belarus were excluded from participation due to the 2022 Russian invasion of Ukraine.

== Medal summary ==
=== Men ===
==== Canoe ====
===== Junior =====
Event	Gold		Silver		Bronze	
C1	Mark Crosbee; Australia	91.19	Michal Urban; Czech Republic	91.54	Lukáš Kratochvíl; Czech Republic	91.93
C1 team	Spain; Markel Imaz; Marc Vicente; Alex Segura	103.66	France; Martin Cornu; Quentin Maillefer; Clément Brotier	105.40	Germany; Franz Gosse; Louis Paaschen; Ben Borrmann	105.55

===== U23 =====
Event	Gold		Silver		Bronze	
C1	Mewen Debliquy; France	87.89	Kacper Sztuba; Poland	88.04	Vojtěch Heger; Czech Republic	89.04
C1 team	France; Mewen Debliquy; Jules Bernardet; Adrien Fischer	92.32	Poland; Kacper Sztuba; Szymon Nowobilski; Konrad Szymanek	104.53	Slovenia; Nejc Polenčič; Juš Javornik; Žiga Lin Hočevar	104.66

==== Kayak ====
===== Junior =====
Event	Gold		Silver		Bronze	
K1	Titouan Castryck; France	83.35	Štěpán Venc; Czech Republic	84.98	Sam Leaver; Great Britain	85.08
K1 team	Slovakia; Ondrej Macúš; Richard Rumanský; Filip Stanko	95.21	France; Titouan Castryck; Hugo Monasse; Théo Reby	98.22	Great Britain; Sam Leaver; Edward McDonald; Oscar Wyllie	103.01
Extreme	Hugo Monasse; France		Martin Cornu; France		Serhii Sovko; Ukraine	

===== U23 =====
Event	Gold		Silver		Bronze	
K1	Anatole Delassus; France	80.31	Felix Oschmautz; Austria	80.63	Jonny Dickson; Great Britain	80.90
K1 team	Italy; Leonardo Grimandi; Davide Ghisetti; Giacomo Barzon	93.15	Spain; Miquel Travé; Pau Echaniz; Darío Cuesta	93.44	France; Anatole Delassus; Pierre Louis Saussereau; Simon Hene	93.76
Extreme	Gaël Adisson; France		Etienne Chappell; Great Britain		Jan Rohrer; Switzerland	

=== Women ===
==== Canoe ====
===== Junior =====
Event	Gold		Silver		Bronze	
C1	Zuzana Paňková; Slovakia	105.06	Nora López; Spain	108.80	Lucie Krech; Germany	110.30
C1 team	Czech Republic; Klára Kneblová; Adriana Morenová; Olga Samková	122.36	Germany; Lucie Krech; Lena Götze; Kimberley Rappe	138.51	Slovakia; Zuzana Paňková; Petronela Ižová; Ema Diešková	139.24

===== U23 =====
Event	Gold		Silver		Bronze	
C1	Elena Borghi; Italy	95.24	Gabriela Satková; Czech Republic	96.90	Emanuela Luknárová; Slovakia	102.20
C1 team	Czech Republic; Gabriela Satková; Eva Říhová; Tereza Kneblová	104.10	Italy; Elena Borghi; Marta Bertoncelli; Carolina Massarenti	114.50	Great Britain; Bethan Forrow; Sophie Ogilvie; Ellis Miller	115.33

==== Kayak ====
===== Junior =====
Event	Gold		Silver		Bronze	
K1	Lucia Pistoni; Italy	94.14	Dominika Brzeska; Poland	95.40	Paulina Pirro; Germany	98.33
K1 team	Czech Republic; Klára Kneblová; Kateřina Švehlová; Olga Samková	110.51	Slovakia; Zuzana Paňková; Petronela Ižová; Lucia Simonidesová	119.86	Spain; Leire Goñi; Haizea Segura; Maite Odriozola	124.06
Extreme	Evy Leibfarth; United States		Zuzana Paňková; Slovakia		Charlotte Wild; Germany	

===== U23 =====
Event	Gold		Silver		Bronze	
K1	Eliška Mintálová; Slovakia	90.51	Emma Vuitton; France	93.55	Mònica Dòria Vilarrubla; Andorra	93.61
K1 team	Czech Republic; Antonie Galušková; Gabriela Satková; Lucie Nesnídalová	105.94	Germany; Annkatrin Plochmann; Emily Apel; Franziska Hanke	106.98	France; Emma Vuitton; Romane Prigent; Angèle Hug	107.58
Extreme	Nikita Setchell; Great Britain		Naemi Brändle; Switzerland		Mònica Dòria Vilarrubla; Andorra	

== Medal table ==
* Host nation (Italy)

Rank	Nation	Gold	Silver	Bronze	Total
1	France (FRA)	6	4	2	12
2	Czech Republic (CZE)	4	3	2	9
3	Slovakia (SVK)	3	2	2	7
4	Italy (ITA)*	3	1	0	4
5	Spain (ESP)	1	2	1	4
6	Great Britain (GBR)	1	1	4	6
7	Australia (AUS)	1	0	0	1
7	United States (USA)	1	0	0	1
9	Poland (POL)	0	3	0	3
10	Germany (GER)	0	2	4	6
11	Switzerland (SUI)	0	1	1	2
12	Austria (AUT)	0	1	0	1
13	Andorra (AND)	0	0	2	2
14	Slovenia (SLO)	0	0	1	1
14	Ukraine (UKR)	0	0	1	1
Totals (15 entries)		20	20	20	60
