= 2006 World Junior Canoe Slalom Championships =

2006 canoe salom competition in Slovenia

The 2006 ICF World Junior Canoe Slalom Championships were the 11th edition of the ICF World Junior Canoe Slalom Championships. The event took place in Solkan, Slovenia from 7 to 9 July 2006 under the auspices of the International Canoe Federation (ICF).

== Medal summary ==
=== Men ===
==== Canoe ====
Event	Gold	Points	Silver	Points	Bronze	Points
C1	Dawid Bartos (POL)	195.24	Norbert Neveu (FRA)	196.67	Sideris Tasiadis (GER)	199.75
C1 team	Germany; Sideris Tasiadis; Pascal Neibecker; Marcus Mehnert	209.71	Poland; Grzegorz Hedwig; Piotr Szczepański; Dawid Bartos	216.65	Great Britain; Greg Pitt; Mark Proctor; Peter Hall	223.82
C2	Hugo Biso/Pierre Picco (FRA)	218.52	Kai Müller/Kevin Müller (GER)	218.81	Robert Behling/Thomas Becker (GER)	221.92
C2 team	France; Hugo Biso/Pierre Picco; Yoan Del Rey/Arthur Grandemange; Jeff Mouroux/Cyril Barbier	242.27	Czech Republic; Robert Gotvald/Jan Vlček; Ondřej Karlovský/Jakub Jáně; Daniel Kopťák/Marcel Postřímovský	248.14	Slovenia; Luka Božič/Sašo Taljat; Jure Janežič/Anže Janežič; Luka Slapšak/Blaž Oven	253.54

==== Kayak ====
Event	Gold	Points	Silver	Points	Bronze	Points
K1	Mateusz Polaczyk (POL)	187.66	Sebastian Schubert (GER)	188.82	Hannes Aigner (GER)	189.97
K1 team	Germany; Sebastian Schubert; Lukas Kalkbrenner; Hannes Aigner	194.99	Czech Republic; Jan Vondra; Vít Přindiš; Tomáš Maslaňák	198.12	France; Lucien Delfour; Quentin Bove; Benoît Guillaume	201.88

=== Women ===
==== Kayak ====
Event	Gold	Points	Silver	Points	Bronze	Points
K1	Urša Kragelj (SLO)	214.37	Jacqueline Horn (GER)	214.57	Carolin Schlumprecht (GER)	218.78
K1 team	Germany; Michaela Grimm; Carolin Schlumprecht; Jacqueline Horn	218.45	Czech Republic; Kateřina Kudějová; Anna Dandová; Miroslava Urbanová	233.57	France; Laura Mangin; Claire Jacquet; Caroline Loir	241.80

== Medal table ==
Rank	Nation	Gold	Silver	Bronze	Total
1	Germany (GER)	3	3	4	10
2	France (FRA)	2	1	2	5
3	Poland (POL)	2	1	0	3
4	Slovenia (SLO)	1	0	1	2
5	Czech Republic (CZE)	0	3	0	3
6	Great Britain (GBR)	0	0	1	1
Totals (6 entries)		8	8	8	24
