= Pierre Picco =

French slalom canoeist (born 1988)

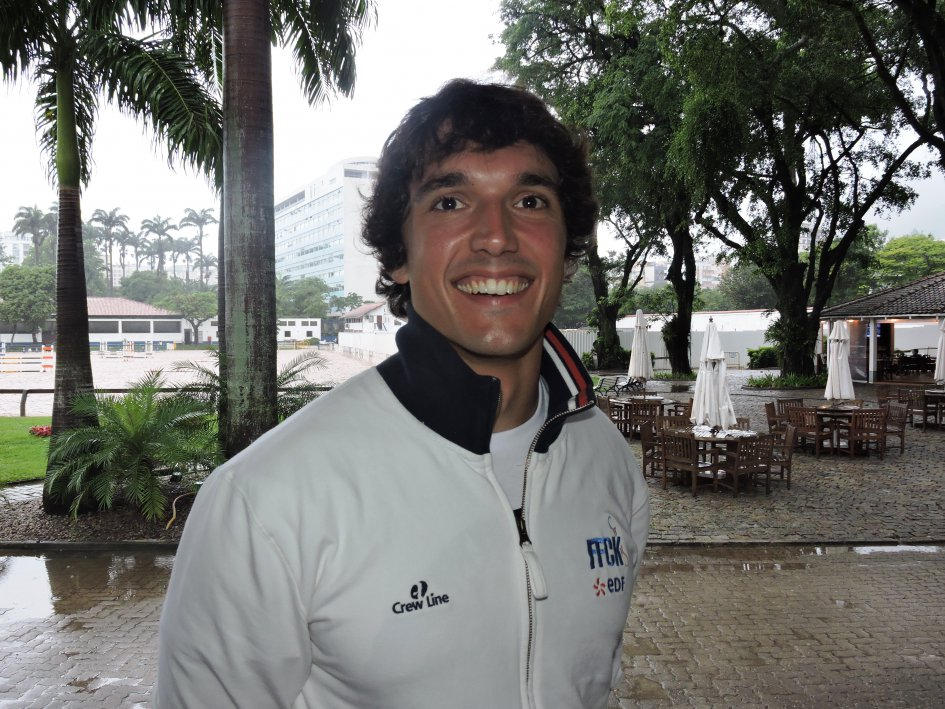
- Pierre Picco

Personal information
- Born: 17 October 1988 (age 37) Toulouse, France
Medal record
Men's canoe slalom
Representing France
World Championships
Gold medal – first place	2010 Tacen	C2 team
Gold medal – first place	2014 Deep Creek Lake	C2 team
Gold medal – first place	2015 London	C2 team
Silver medal – second place	2014 Deep Creek Lake	C2
Silver medal – second place	2015 London	C2
European Championships
Gold medal – first place	2013 Kraków	C2 team
Gold medal – first place	2017 Tacen	C2
Gold medal – first place	2017 Tacen	C2 team
Silver medal – second place	2014 Vienna	C2 team
U23 European Championships
Gold medal – first place	2010 Markkleeberg	C2
Gold medal – first place	2009 Liptovský Mikuláš	C2 team
Bronze medal – third place	2007 Kraków	C2 team
Junior World Championships
Gold medal – first place	2006 Solkan	C2
Gold medal – first place	2006 Solkan	C2 team
Junior European Championships
Silver medal – second place	2005 Kraków	C2
Silver medal – second place	2006 Nottingham	C2
Bronze medal – third place	2006 Nottingham	C2 team

Pierre Picco (born 17 October 1988) is a French slalom canoeist who has competed at the international level since 2005 together with Hugo Biso in the C2 class.

He won five medals at the ICF Canoe Slalom World Championships with three golds (C2 team: 2010, 2014, 2015) and two silvers (C2: 2014, 2015). He also won three golds and a silver at the European Championships.

Picco won the overall World Cup title in the C2 category in 2016.

== World Cup individual podiums ==
Season	Date	Venue	Position	Event
2011	26 Jun 2011	Tacen	2nd	C2
2011	3 Jul 2011	L'Argentière-la-Bessée	3rd	C2
2014	3 Aug 2014	La Seu d'Urgell	3rd	C2
2016	11 Sep 2016	Tacen	3rd	C2
2017	17 Jun 2017	Prague	3rd	C2
