= Pavel Janda =

Czech canoeist

Medal record

Men's canoe slalom

Representing Czechoslovakia

Junior World Championships
Silver medal – second place	1992 Sjoa	C1 team

Representing Czech Republic

European Championships
Silver medal – second place	1996 Augsburg	C1 team

Junior World Championships
Gold medal – first place	1994 Wausau	C1 team

Pavel Janda (born 18 August 1976 in Ostrov) is a Czech slalom canoeist who competed at the international level from 1992 to 1996.

Janda won a silver medal in the C1 team event at the 1996 European Championships in Augsburg. He also finished 20th in the C1 event at the 1996 Summer Olympics in Atlanta.
