= 2024 World Junior and U23 Canoe Slalom Championships =

- Venue: Ondrej Cibak Whitewater Slalom Course
- Location: Liptovský Mikuláš, Slovakia
- Dates: 2 to 7 July

The 2024 ICF World Junior and U23 Canoe Slalom Championships took place in Liptovský Mikuláš, Slovakia, from 2 to 7 July 2024, under the auspices of the International Canoe Federation (ICF). It was the 25th edition of the competition for the Juniors (U18) and the 12th edition for the Under 23 category.

Liptovský Mikuláš hosted the event for the second time after previously hosting it in 2013.

== Medal summary ==
=== Junior ===
==== Men ====
===== Canoe =====
| Event | Gold | | Silver | | Bronze | |
|---|---|---|---|---|---|---|
| C1 | Žiga Lin Hočevar; Slovenia | 92.45 | Martin Cornu; France | 100.45 | Niels Zimmermann; Germany | 100.95 |
| C1 team | France; Martin Cornu; Elouan Debliquy; Titouan Estanguet | 96.58 | Germany; Felix Sachers; Niels Zimmermann; Anton Weber | 97.82 | Czech Republic; Jonáš Heger; Jakub Voneš; Vojtěch Malý | 101.59 |

===== Kayak =====
| Event | Gold | | Silver | | Bronze | |
|---|---|---|---|---|---|---|
| K1 | Žiga Lin Hočevar; Slovenia | 87.21 | Martin Cornu; France | 92.84 | Michal Kopeček; Czech Republic | 92.97 |
| K1 team | France; Martin Cornu; Elouan Debliquy; Titouan Estanguet | 90.69 | Italy; Michele Pistoni; Andrea Nardo; Nicola Pistoni | 94.24 | Germany; David Becke; Luis Hartmann; Felix Sachers | 95.61 |
| Kayak cross | Faust Clotet Juanmarti; Spain | | Žiga Lin Hočevar; Slovenia | | Jonah Hanrahan; Great Britain | |

==== Women ====
===== Canoe =====
| Event | Gold | | Silver | | Bronze | |
|---|---|---|---|---|---|---|
| C1 | Yang Ting; China | 112.84 | Léna Quémérais; France | 113.52 | Valentýna Kočířová; Czech Republic | 113.65 |
| C1 team | Czech Republic; Valentýna Kočířová; Markéta Štěpánková; Natálie Erlová | 116.86 | France; Léna Quémérais; Camille Brugvin; Margot Lapeze | 122.77 | Germany; Neele Krech; Christin Heydenreich; Carolin Diemer | 125.71 |

===== Kayak =====
| Event | Gold | | Silver | | Bronze | |
|---|---|---|---|---|---|---|
| K1 | Klára Mrázková; Czech Republic | 103.21 | Hanna Danek; Poland | 105.45 | Caterina Pignat; Italy | 106.00 |
| K1 team | Czech Republic; Bára Galušková; Markéta Hojdová; Klára Mrázková | 101.98 | Germany; Nova Müller; Mina Blume; Christin Heydenreich | 105.19 | France; Léna Quémérais; Camille Brugvin; Camille Vuitton | 109.23 |
| Kayak cross | Naja Pinterič; Slovenia | | Haizea Segura; Spain | | Codie Davidson; Australia | |

=== Under 23 ===
==== Men ====
===== Canoe =====
| Event | Gold | | Silver | | Bronze | |
|---|---|---|---|---|---|---|
| C1 | Manuel Trípano; Argentina | 95.27 | Yohann Senechault; France | 95.48 | Lukáš Kratochvíl; Czech Republic | 95.71 |
| C1 team | Czech Republic; Adam Král; Martin Kratochvíl; Lukáš Kratochvíl | 92.92 | Slovenia; Nejc Polenčič; Juš Javornik; Žiga Lin Hočevar | 96.84 | France; Mewen Debliquy; Yohann Senechault; Tanguy Adisson | 97.40 |

===== Kayak =====
| Event | Gold | | Silver | | Bronze | |
|---|---|---|---|---|---|---|
| K1 | Anatole Delassus; France | 89.92 | Jakub Krejčí; Czech Republic | 89.97 | Lan Tominc; Slovenia | 90.93 |
| K1 team | France; Leo Vuitton; Anatole Delassus; Edgar Paleau-Brasseur | 88.09 | Great Britain; Sam Leaver; Ben Haylett; Jonny Dickson | 88.60 | Italy; Xabier Ferrazzi; Gabriele Grimandi; Tommaso Panico | 90.07 |
| Kayak cross | Gaël Adisson; France | | Anatole Delassus; France | | Matyáš Novák; Czech Republic | |

==== Women ====
===== Canoe =====
| Event | Gold | | Silver | | Bronze | |
|---|---|---|---|---|---|---|
| C1 | Gabriela Satková; Czech Republic | 99.72 | Marta Bertoncelli; Italy | 105.57 | Eva Alina Hočevar; Slovenia | 107.25 |
| C1 team | Italy; Marta Bertoncelli; Elena Micozzi; Elena Borghi | 110.90 | Germany; Kimberley Rappe; Lucie Krech; Jannemien Panzlaff | 119.74 | Spain; Nora López; Clara González; Izar García | 119.75 |

===== Kayak =====
| Event | Gold | | Silver | | Bronze | |
|---|---|---|---|---|---|---|
| K1 | Lois Leaver; Great Britain | 100.16 | Eva Alina Hočevar; Slovenia | 100.28 | Kateřina Beková; Czech Republic | 101.81 |
| K1 team | Germany; Antonia Plochmann; Emily Apel; Annkatrin Plochmann | 99.67 | France; Emma Vuitton; Ilona Martin Laemle; Eva Pietracha | 102.52 | Czech Republic; Lucie Nesnídalová; Kateřina Beková; Klára Kneblová | 102.54 |
| Kayak cross | Emma Vuitton; France | | Leire Goñi; Spain | | Kateřina Beková; Czech Republic | |

== Medal table ==
* Host nation (Slovakia)

| Rank | Nation | Gold | Silver | Bronze | Total |
|---|---|---|---|---|---|
| 1 | France (FRA) | 6 | 7 | 2 | 15 |
| 2 | Czech Republic (CZE) | 5 | 1 | 8 | 14 |
| 3 | Slovenia (SLO) | 3 | 3 | 2 | 8 |
| 4 | Germany (GER) | 1 | 3 | 3 | 7 |
| 5 | Italy (ITA) | 1 | 2 | 2 | 5 |
| 6 | Spain (ESP) | 1 | 2 | 1 | 4 |
| 7 | Great Britain (GBR) | 1 | 1 | 1 | 3 |
| 8 | Argentina (ARG) | 1 | 0 | 0 | 1 |
| 8 | China (CHN) | 1 | 0 | 0 | 1 |
| 10 | Poland (POL) | 0 | 1 | 0 | 1 |
| 11 | Australia (AUS) | 0 | 0 | 1 | 1 |
| Totals (11 entries) | | 20 | 20 | 20 | 60 |
