= Eva Říhová =

Czech canoeist

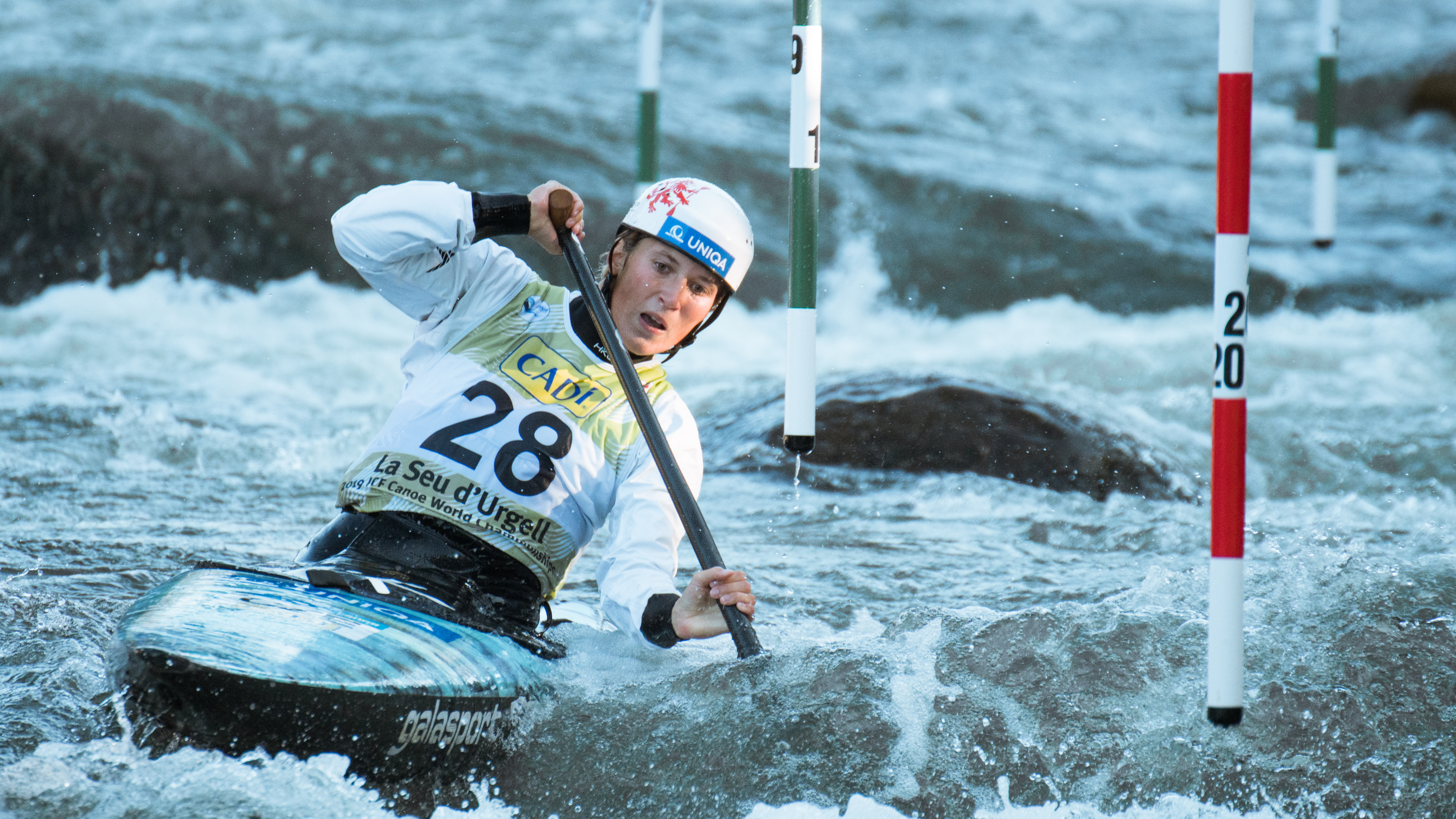

Personal information
- Nationality: Czech
- Born: 5 January 2000 (age 26)

Sport
- Country: Czech Republic
- Sport: Canoe slalom
- Event: C1, K1
Medal record
Women's canoe slalom
Representing Czech Republic
World Championships
Bronze medal – third place	2017 Pau	C1 team
Bronze medal – third place	2019 La Seu d'Urgell	C1 team
European Championships
Bronze medal – third place	2017 Tacen	C1 team
Bronze medal – third place	2019 Pau	C1 team
U23 World Championships
Gold medal – first place	2019 Kraków	C1 team
Gold medal – first place	2021 Tacen	C1 team
Gold medal – first place	2022 Ivrea	C1 team
Gold medal – first place	2023 Kraków	C1 team
U23 European Championships
Gold medal – first place	2022 České Budějovice	C1 team
Gold medal – first place	2023 Bratislava	C1 team
Silver medal – second place	2019 Liptovský Mikuláš	C1 team
Junior World Championships
Gold medal – first place	2015 Foz do Iguaçu	K1 team
Gold medal – first place	2018 Ivrea	C1 team
Bronze medal – third place	2017 Bratislava	C1 team
Junior European Championships
Gold medal – first place	2015 Kraków	C1 team
Gold medal – first place	2018 Bratislava	C1 team
Silver medal – second place	2016 Solkan	C1 team

Eva Říhová (born 5 January 2000) is a Czech slalom canoeist who has competed at the international level since 2015.

She won two bronze medals in the C1 team event at the ICF Canoe Slalom World Championships (2017, 2019). She also won two bronze medals in the same event at the European Championships.
