= Ian Wiley =

Irish slalom canoeist (born 1968)

Medal record

Men's canoe slalom

Representing Ireland

European Championships
Gold medal – first place	1996 Augsburg	K1

Junior World Championships
Silver medal – second place	1986 Spittal	K1

Ian Wiley (born 5 May 1968 in Dublin) is an Irish slalom canoeist who competed at the international level from 1986 to 2000. He represented Ireland at several Olympic games and won gold at the 1996 European Canoe Slalom Championships.

== Sporting career ==
Wiley was a European junior champion in 1984, and a silver medalist at the world Junior Championships in 1986 at Spittal, Austria.

He became the European Champion in K1 at the 1996 European Canoe Slalom Championships in Augsburg. Competing in three Summer Olympics, he earned his best finish of fifth in the K1 event at the 1996 Atlanta Olympics.

Wiley announced his competitive retirement after finishing outside the qualification places for the men's K1 slalom final at the 2000 Summer Olympics in Sydney.

== World Cup individual podiums ==
Season	Date	Venue	Position	Event
1989	20 Aug 1989	Tacen	2nd	K1
1991	30 Jun 1991	Mezzana	2nd	K1
1991	25 Aug 1991	Minden	2nd	K1
1991	1 Sep 1991	Wausau	1st	K1
1993	18 Jul 1993	La Seu d'Urgell	1st	K1
1994	17 Jul 1994	La Seu d'Urgell	3rd	K1
1996	9 Jun 1996	La Seu d'Urgell	1st	K1
1997	28 Jul 1997	Ocoee	1st	K1
1997	3 Aug 1997	Minden	2nd	K1
