= 2025 World Junior and U23 Canoe Slalom Championships =

International canoeing competition

- Location: Foix, France
- Dates: 8 to 13 July

The 2025 ICF World Junior and U23 Canoe Slalom Championships took place in Foix, France, from 8 to 13 July 2025, under the auspices of the International Canoe Federation (ICF). It was the 26th edition of the competition for the Juniors (U18) and the 13th edition for the Under 23 category.

Foix hosted the World Junior Championships in 2010, but this was the first time it hosted the Under-23 championships.

== Medal summary ==
=== Junior ===
==== Men ====
===== Canoe =====
Event	Gold		Silver		Bronze	
C1	Oier Díaz; Spain	91.87	Žiga Lin Hočevar; Slovenia	93.03	Titouan Estanguet; France	93.62
C1 team	France; Léo Ulmer; Titouan Estanguet; Mathéo Senechault	95.30	Spain; Oier Díaz; Oihan Deus; Jan Vicente	99.41	Czech Republic; Jakub Voneš; Jáchym Hanzel; Dominik Řežábek	102.18

===== Kayak =====
Event	Gold		Silver		Bronze	
K1	Michal Kopeček; Czech Republic	85.06	Žiga Lin Hočevar; Slovenia	85.62	Titouan Estanguet; France	87.71
K1 team	Slovenia; Žiga Lin Hočevar; Tadej Tilinger; Tjas Velikonja	91.35	Czech Republic; Michal Kopeček; Jáchym Fröhlich; Martin Panzer	92.34	Spain; Faust Clotet Juanmarti; Oier Díaz; Dídac Foz	93.66
Kayak cross	Žiga Lin Hočevar; Slovenia		Oier Díaz; Spain		Faust Clotet Juanmarti; Spain	
Kayak cross individual	Žiga Lin Hočevar; Slovenia	51.21	Faust Clotet Juanmarti; Spain	51.52	Clément Davy; France	52.78

==== Women ====
===== Canoe =====
Event	Gold		Silver		Bronze	
C1	Markéta Štěpánková; Czech Republic	108.65	Neele Krech; Germany	109.74	Zoe Blythe-Shields; Great Britain	112.11
C1 team	Czech Republic; Valentýna Kočířová; Markéta Štěpánková; Barbora Ondráčková	116.50	Great Britain; Zoe Blythe-Shields; Darcey McMullins; Jasmine Wilde	136.11	Switzerland; Eyleen Vuilleumier; Leni Uffer; Florance Moinian	142.93

===== Kayak =====
Event	Gold		Silver		Bronze	
K1	Hanna Danek; Poland	101.18	Barbora Ondráčková; Czech Republic	101.37	Mina Blume; Germany	101.48
K1 team	Czech Republic; Markéta Hojdová; Anna Fabianová; Barbora Ondráčková	103.76	Great Britain; Zoe Blythe-Shields; Arina Kontchakov; Sofia Alfer	105.08	France; Margot Lapeze; Suzanne Brossard; Judith Locatelli	110.41
Kayak cross	Mina Blume; Germany		Britta Jung; Germany		Ainara Goikoetxea; Spain	
Kayak cross individual	Anna Simona; Spain	57.69	Arina Kontchakov; Great Britain	57.97	Britta Jung; Germany	57.97

=== Under 23 ===
==== Men ====
===== Canoe =====
Event	Gold		Silver		Bronze	
C1	Lukáš Kratochvíl; Czech Republic	89.67	Oliver Puchner; New Zealand	92.71	Alex Segura; Spain	93.41
C1 team	Czech Republic; Adam Král; Lukáš Kratochvíl; Martin Kratochvíl	91.04	France; Elouan Debliquy; Mewen Debliquy; Yohann Senechault	95.19	Germany; Konrad Ginzel; Philipp Süß; Benjamin Kies	96.23

===== Kayak =====
Event	Gold		Silver		Bronze	
K1	Titouan Castryck; France	81.28	Xabier Ferrazzi; Italy	81.42	Manel Contreras; Spain	82.81
K1 team	Great Britain; Jonah Hanrahan; Sam Leaver; Thomas Mayer	86.29	France; Titouan Castryck; Martin Cornu; Noe Perreau	86.34	Czech Republic; Jakub Krejčí; Matyáš Novák; Martin Rudorfer	86.82
Kayak cross	Nicholas Collier; New Zealand		Titouan Castryck; France		Xabier Ferrazzi; Italy	
Kayak cross individual	Sam Leaver; Great Britain	50.62	Matyáš Novák; Czech Republic	50.92	Jakub Krejčí; Czech Republic	51.06

==== Women ====
===== Canoe =====
Event	Gold		Silver		Bronze	
C1	Evy Leibfarth; United States	100.45	Zuzana Paňková; Slovakia	100.78	Eva Alina Hočevar; Slovenia	102.57
C1 team	Germany; Kimberley Rappe; Jannemien Panzlaff; Lucie Krech	109.87	Czech Republic; Adriana Morenová; Tereza Kneblová; Olga Samková	112.22	France; Doriane Delassus; Zoe Laurent; Nina Pesce-Roue	113.01

===== Kayak =====
Event	Gold		Silver		Bronze	
K1	Eva Alina Hočevar; Slovenia	93.76	Evy Leibfarth; United States	94.27	Lois Leaver; Great Britain	94.42
K1 team	Czech Republic; Lucie Nesnídalová; Kateřina Beková; Klára Mrázková	97.22	France; Emma Vuitton; Doriane Delassus; Nina Pesce-Roue	98.74	United States; Evy Leibfarth; Ria Sribar; Marcella Altman	103.51
Kayak cross	Doriane Delassus; France		Lois Leaver; Great Britain		Kateřina Beková; Czech Republic	
Kayak cross individual	Zuzana Paňková; Slovakia	55.36	Olga Samková; Czech Republic	55.65	Tereza Kneblová; Czech Republic	56.43

== Medal table ==
* Host nation (France)

Rank	Nation	Gold	Silver	Bronze	Total
1	Czech Republic (CZE)	7	5	5	17
2	Slovenia (SLO)	4	2	1	7
3	France (FRA)*	3	4	5	12
4	Great Britain (GBR)	2	4	2	8
5	Spain (ESP)	2	3	5	10
6	Germany (GER)	2	2	3	7
7	United States (USA)	1	1	1	3
8	New Zealand (NZL)	1	1	0	2
8	Slovakia (SVK)	1	1	0	2
10	Poland (POL)	1	0	0	1
11	Italy (ITA)	0	1	1	2
12	Switzerland (SUI)	0	0	1	1
Totals (12 entries)		24	24	24	72
