= Grzegorz Polaczyk =

Polish canoeist

Medal record

Men's canoe slalom

Representing Poland

World Championships
Silver medal – second place	2013 Prague	K1 team
Bronze medal – third place	2006 Prague	K1 team

European Championships
Gold medal – first place	2008 Kraków	K1 team
Gold medal – first place	2010 Bratislava	K1 team
Silver medal – second place	2006 L'Argentière-la-Bessée	K1 team
Silver medal – second place	2011 La Seu d'Urgell	K1 team
Bronze medal – third place	2013 Kraków	K1 team

U23 European Championships
Gold medal – first place	2005 Kraków	K1 team
Gold medal – first place	2006 Nottingham	K1 team
Gold medal – first place	2007 Kraków	K1 team
Silver medal – second place	2005 Kraków	K1
Silver medal – second place	2008 Solkan	K1
Bronze medal – third place	2008 Solkan	K1 team

Junior World Championships
Gold medal – first place	2002 Nowy Sącz	K1

Junior European Championships
Gold medal – first place	2003 Hohenlimburg	K1

Grzegorz Polaczyk (born 2 July 1985 in Nowy Sącz) is a Polish slalom canoeist who competed at the international level from 2001 to 2014.

He won two medals in the K1 team event at the ICF Canoe Slalom World Championships with a silver in 2013 and a bronze in 2006. He also won two golds, two silvers and a bronze in the same event at the European Championships.

Polaczyk finished seventh in the K1 event at the 2004 Summer Olympics in Athens.

He has four brothers (Mateusz, Rafał, Henryk and Łukasz) and two sisters (Joanna Mędoń and Iwona) all of whom have competed in canoe slalom.
