= Hugo Biso =

French slalom canoeist

Personal information
- Born: 14 February 1988 (age 38) Agen, France
Medal record
Men's canoe slalom
Representing France
World Championships
Gold medal – first place	2010 Tacen	C2 team
Gold medal – first place	2014 Deep Creek Lake	C2 team
Gold medal – first place	2015 London	C2 team
Silver medal – second place	2014 Deep Creek Lake	C2
Silver medal – second place	2015 London	C2
European Championships
Gold medal – first place	2013 Kraków	C2 team
Gold medal – first place	2017 Tacen	C2
Gold medal – first place	2017 Tacen	C2 team
Silver medal – second place	2014 Vienna	C2 team
U23 European Championships
Gold medal – first place	2010 Markkleeberg	C2
Gold medal – first place	2009 Liptovský Mikuláš	C2 team
Bronze medal – third place	2007 Kraków	C2 team
Junior World Championships
Gold medal – first place	2006 Solkan	C2
Gold medal – first place	2006 Solkan	C2 team
Junior European Championships
Silver medal – second place	2005 Kraków	C2
Silver medal – second place	2006 Nottingham	C2
Bronze medal – third place	2006 Nottingham	C2 team

Hugo Biso (born 14 February 1988) is a French slalom canoeist who has competed at the international level since 2005 together with Pierre Picco in the C2 class.

He won five medals at the ICF Canoe Slalom World Championships with three golds (C2 team: 2010, 2014, 2015) and two silvers (C2: 2014, 2015). He also won three golds and a silver at the European Championships.

Biso won the overall World Cup title in the C2 class in 2016.

== World Cup individual podiums ==
Season	Date	Venue	Position	Event
2011	26 Jun 2011	Tacen	2nd	C2
2011	3 Jul 2011	L'Argentière-la-Bessée	3rd	C2
2014	3 Aug 2014	La Seu d'Urgell	3rd	C2
2016	11 Sep 2016	Tacen	3rd	C2
2017	17 Jun 2017	Prague	3rd	C2
