= Lukáš Kratochvíl =

Czech canoeist (born 2005)

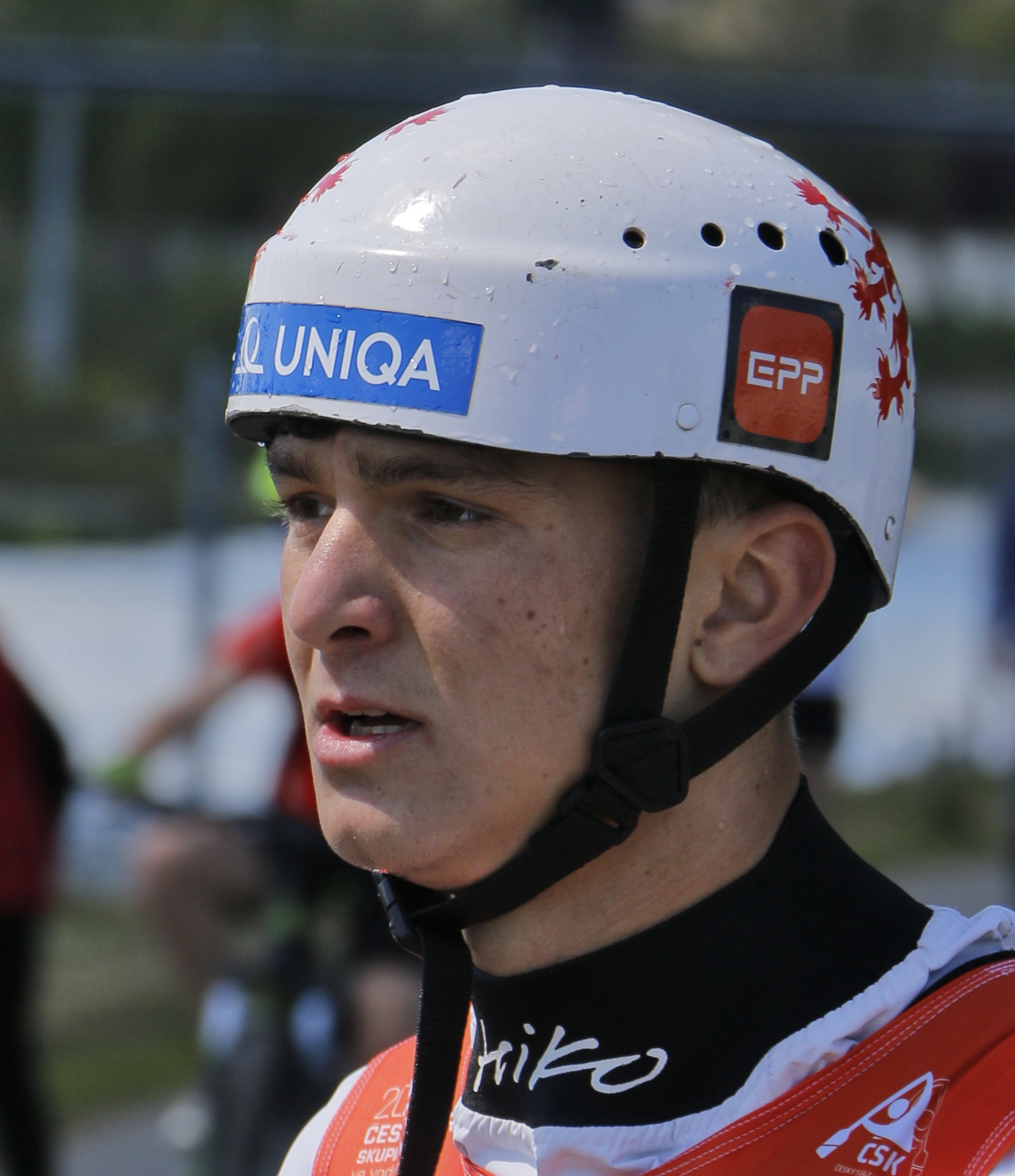
- Kratochvíl in 2024

Personal information
- Nationality: Czech
- Born: 27 April 2005 (age 21)

Sport
- Sport: Canoe slalom
- Event: C1, Kayak cross
Medal record
Men's Canoe slalom
Representing Czech Republic
World Championships
Bronze medal – third place	2026 Oklahoma City	C1
European Championships
Silver medal – second place	2026 Ivrea	C1
Silver medal – second place	2026 Ivrea	C1 team
U23 World Championships
Gold medal – first place	2024 Liptovský Mikuláš	C1 team
Gold medal – first place	2025 Foix	C1
Gold medal – first place	2025 Foix	C1 team
Silver medal – second place	2026 Kraków	C1
Silver medal – second place	2026 Kraków	C1 team
Bronze medal – third place	2024 Liptovský Mikuláš	C1
Junior World Championships
Gold medal – first place	2023 Kraków	C1 team
Bronze medal – third place	2022 Ivrea	C1
Bronze medal – third place	2023 Kraków	C1
Junior European Championships
Gold medal – first place	2023 Bratislava	C1 team
Silver medal – second place	2022 České Budějovice	C1 team
Silver medal – second place	2023 Bratislava	Kayak cross
Bronze medal – third place	2023 Bratislava	C1

Lukáš Kratochvíl (born 27 April 2005) is a Czech slalom canoeist who has competed at the international level since 2022.

== Career ==
Kratochvíl made his U23 World Canoe Slalom Championships debut in 2024 and won a gold medal in the C1 team event. He also competed in the C1 event where he won a bronze medal after a penalty for touching a gate. He again competed at the 2025 U23 World Canoe Slalom Championships and won gold medals in the C1 team and C1 events.

In July 2026, he competed at the 2026 U23 World Canoe Slalom Championships and won silver medals in the C1 team and C1 events. Weeks later, he made his World Championship debut at the 2026 ICF Canoe Slalom World Championships. In the qualification for the C1 event he finished in second place with a time 84.60 seconds and advanced to the semifinals. He eventually won a bronze medal for his final run.

He won two silver medals at the 2026 European Championships in Ivrea.

== Personal life ==
Kratochvíl's older brother, Martin, is also a slalom canoeist.
