= Sebastian Piersig =

German slalom canoeist (born 1984)

Medal record

Men's canoe slalom

Representing Germany

World Championships
Silver medal – second place	2006 Prague	C2 team

European Championships
Gold medal – first place	2006 L'Argentière-la-Bessée	C2 team
Gold medal – first place	2007 Liptovský Mikuláš	C2 team

U23 European Championships
Bronze medal – third place	2004 Kraków	C2
Bronze medal – third place	2005 Kraków	C2 team

Junior World Championships
Gold medal – first place	2002 Nowy Sącz	C2
Gold medal – first place	2002 Nowy Sącz	C2 team
Silver medal – second place	2000 Bratislava	C2 team

Junior European Championships
Gold medal – first place	2001 Bratislava	C2 team

Sebastian Piersig (born 28 May 1984 in Spremberg) is a German slalom canoeist who competed at the international level from 2000 to 2009 in the C2 class together with Felix Michel.

He won a silver medal in the C2 team event at the 2006 ICF Canoe Slalom World Championships in Prague. He also won two gold medals in the same event at the European Championships.

Piersig finished sixth in the C2 event at the 2008 Summer Olympics in Beijing.

== World Cup individual podiums ==
Season	Date	Venue	Position	Event
2007	8 Jul 2007	Tacen	3rd	C2
