= Jakub Jáně =

Czech slalom canoeist (born 1990)

Personal information
- Nationality: Czech
- Born: 13 September 1990 (age 35) Hradec Králové, Czech Republic
- Height: 1.75 m (5 ft 9 in)
- Weight: 75 kg (165 lb)

Sport
- Country: Czech Republic
- Sport: Canoe slalom
- Event: C2, Mixed C2
- Club: ASC Dukla
Medal record
Men's canoe slalom
Representing Czech Republic
World Championships
Gold medal – first place	2013 Prague	C2 team
Gold medal – first place	2019 La Seu d'Urgell	Mixed C2
Bronze medal – third place	2014 Deep Creek Lake	C2 team
European Championships
Silver medal – second place	2012 Augsburg	C2 team
Silver medal – second place	2015 Markkleeberg	C2 team
Silver medal – second place	2018 Prague	C2 team
Bronze medal – third place	2013 Kraków	C2
Bronze medal – third place	2014 Vienna	C2 team
Bronze medal – third place	2017 Tacen	C2 team
Bronze medal – third place	2018 Prague	C2
U23 World Championships
Gold medal – first place	2012 Wausau	C2 team
Gold medal – first place	2013 Liptovský Mikuláš	C2 team
Silver medal – second place	2012 Wausau	C2
U23 European Championships
Gold medal – first place	2011 Banja Luka	C2 team
Silver medal – second place	2010 Markkleeberg	C2 team
Silver medal – second place	2011 Banja Luka	C2
Silver medal – second place	2012 Solkan	C2 team
Bronze medal – third place	2010 Markkleeberg	C2
Bronze medal – third place	2009 Liptovský Mikuláš	C2 team
Junior World Championships
Gold medal – first place	2008 Roudnice nad Labem	C2 team
Silver medal – second place	2006 Solkan	C2 team
Silver medal – second place	2008 Roudnice nad Labem	C2
Junior European Championships
Gold medal – first place	2008 Solkan	C2 team
Silver medal – second place	2008 Solkan	C2

Jakub Jáně (born 13 September 1990) is a retired Czech slalom canoeist who competed at the international level from 2006 to 2019, specializing in the C2 and mixed C2 events.

He won three medals at the ICF Canoe Slalom World Championships with two golds (Mixed C2: 2019, C2 team: 2013) and a bronze (C2 team: 2014). He also won three silver and four bronze medals at the European Canoe Slalom Championships.

His partner in the men's C2 was Ondřej Karlovský.

Jáně won the overall World Cup title in mixed C2 in 2018 together with Tereza Fišerová. It was the only year when mixed C2 was included in the World Cup.

His older brother Michal is also a slalom canoeist.

== World Cup individual podiums ==
Season	Date	Venue	Position	Event
2015	21 Jun 2015	Prague	2nd	C2
2016	4 Sep 2016	Prague	3rd	C2
2018	23 Jun 2018	Liptovský Mikuláš	2nd	Mixed C2
2018	30 Jun 2018	Kraków	1st	Mixed C2
2018	7 Jul 2018	Augsburg	2nd	Mixed C2
2018	8 Sep 2018	La Seu d'Urgell	1st	Mixed C2
