= Alexander Grimm =

German slalom canoeist

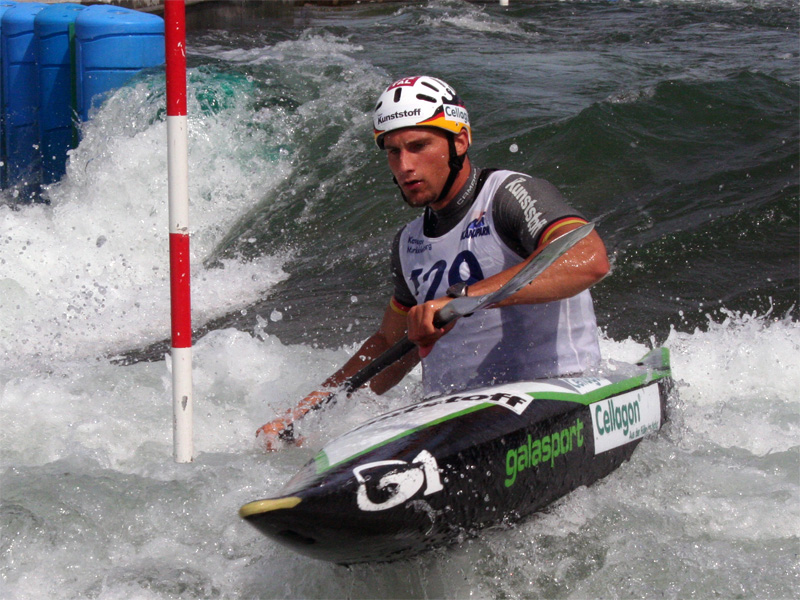
- Grimm in 2011

Personal information
- Born: 6 September 1986 (age 39) Augsburg
Medal record
Men's canoe slalom
Representing Germany
Olympic Games
Gold medal – first place	2008 Beijing	K1
World Championships
Gold medal – first place	2007 Foz do Iguaçu	K1 team
Gold medal – first place	2010 Tacen	K1 team
Gold medal – first place	2011 Bratislava	K1 team
European Championships
Gold medal – first place	2014 Vienna	K1 team
Gold medal – first place	2015 Markkleeberg	K1 team
Silver medal – second place	2005 Tacen	K1 team
Silver medal – second place	2007 Liptovský Mikuláš	K1 team
Silver medal – second place	2009 Nottingham	K1 team
Silver medal – second place	2010 Bratislava	K1 team
Silver medal – second place	2015 Markkleeberg	K1
Bronze medal – third place	2006 L'Argentière-la-Bessée	K1 team
Junior World Championships
Gold medal – first place	2004 Lofer	K1
Silver medal – second place	2002 Nowy Sącz	K1 team
Silver medal – second place	2004 Lofer	K1 team
Junior European Championships
Gold medal – first place	2003 Hohenlimburg	K1 team
Bronze medal – third place	2003 Hohenlimburg	K1

Alexander Grimm (born 6 September 1986 in Augsburg) is a German slalom canoeist who has competed at the international level since 2002.

Grimm won a gold medal in the K1 event at the 2008 Summer Olympics in Beijing.

He also won three gold medals in the K1 team event at the ICF Canoe Slalom World Championships, earning them in 2007, 2010 and 2011. He won a total of eight medals at the European Championships (2 golds, 5 silvers and 1 bronze).

Grimm won the 2009 Adidas Sickline whitewater extreme race, despite having little previous experience of extreme whitewater or indeed of paddling the creekboats used to enhance paddler safety.

His younger sister Michaela has also represented Germany in canoe slalom.

== World Cup individual podiums ==
Season	Date	Venue	Position	Event
2006	28 May 2006	Athens	3rd	K1
2006	11 Jun 2006	La Seu d'Urgell	2nd	K1
2007	18 Mar 2007	Foz do Iguaçu	3rd	K1^{1}
2007	14 Jul 2007	Augsburg	1st	K1
2009	5 Jul 2009	Bratislava	3rd	K1
2009	11 Jul 2009	Augsburg	2nd	K1
2010	3 Jul 2010	Augsburg	2nd	K1

^{1} Pan American Championship counting for World Cup points
