= Christos Tsakmakis =

Greek canoeist (born 1987)

Medal record

Men's canoe slalom

Representing Greece

European Championships
Bronze medal – third place	2007 Liptovský Mikuláš	C1

U23 European Championships
Gold medal – first place	2007 Kraków	C1
Gold medal – first place	2008 Solkan	C1
Bronze medal – third place	2006 Nottingham	C1
Bronze medal – third place	2010 Markkleeberg	C1

Junior World Championships
Bronze medal – third place	2004 Lofer	C1

Junior European Championships
Silver medal – second place	2005 Kraków	C1

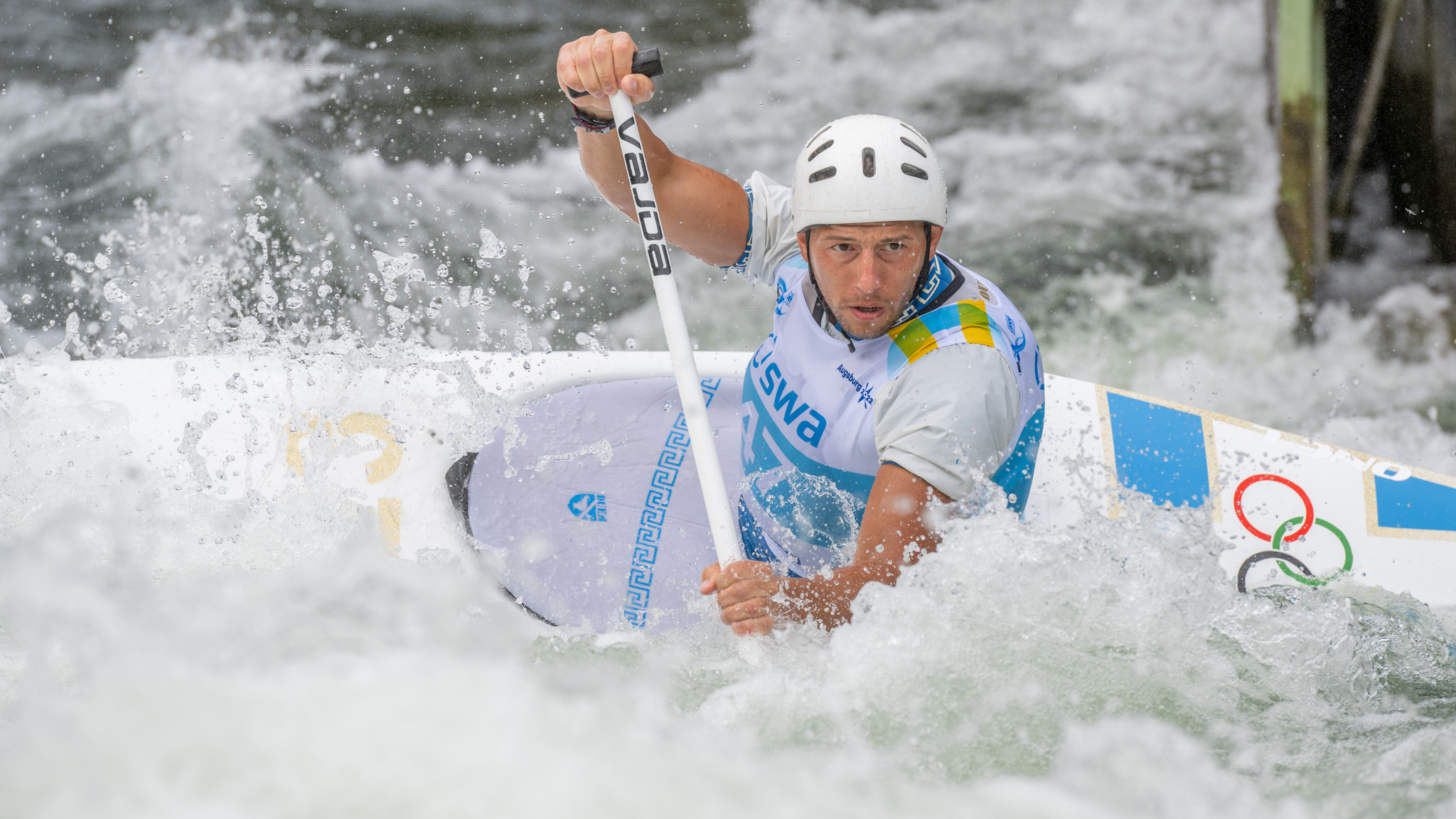
Christos Tsakmakis performing at 2022 ICF Canoe Slalom World Championships in Augsburg, Germany

Christos Tsakmakis (born 6 September 1987 in Augsburg) is a German-born, Greek slalom canoeist who has competed at the international level since 2002.

He won a bronze medal in the C1 event at the 2007 European Championships in Liptovský Mikuláš.

Competing in three Summer Olympics, he earned his best finish of seventh in the C1 event in Beijing in 2008.
