= Boštjan Žitnik =

Medal record

Men's canoe slalom

Representing Yugoslavia

World Championships
Bronze medal – third place	1989 Savage River	C1 team

Junior World Championships
Silver medal – second place	1986 Spittal	C1

Representing Slovenia

World Championships
Gold medal – first place	1993 Mezzana	C1 team

Boštjan Žitnik (born 31 March 1971 in Ljubljana) is a Yugoslav-born Slovenian slalom canoeist who competed at the international level from 1986 to 1995.

He won two medals in the C1 team event at the ICF Canoe Slalom World Championships with a gold in 1993 (for Slovenia) and a bronze in 1989 (for Yugoslavia).

Žitnik also finished tenth in the C1 event at the 1992 Summer Olympics in Barcelona.

His father Franc represented Yugoslavia at the 1972 Summer Olympics where he finished 19th in the C2 event.

== World Cup individual podiums ==
Season	Date	Venue	Position	Event
1989	20 Aug 1989	Tacen	2nd	C1
