= 1986 World Junior Canoe Slalom Championships =

The 1986 ICF World Junior Canoe Slalom Championships were the inaugural edition of the ICF World Junior Canoe Slalom Championships. The event took place in Spittal an der Drau, Austria from 16 to 20 July 1986 under the auspices of the International Canoe Federation (ICF).

Three medal events took place. No C2 event or team events were held.

== Medal summary ==
=== Men ===
==== Canoe ====
Event	Gold		Silver		Bronze	
C1	Jed Prentice (USA)	197.71	Boštjan Žitnik (YUG)	210.73	Karel Kaufmann (FRG)	215.50

==== Kayak ====
Event	Gold		Silver		Bronze	
K1	Marko Černe (YUG)	184.07	Ian Wiley (IRL)	186.87	Tomaž Štokelj (YUG)	187.99

=== Women ===
==== Kayak ====
Event	Gold		Silver		Bronze	
K1	Anouk Loubie (FRA)	209.56	Anita Schirmer (FRG)	215.41	Heather Corrie (GBR)	215.41

== Medal table ==
Rank	Nation	Gold	Silver	Bronze	Total
1	Yugoslavia (YUG)	1	1	1	3
2	France (FRA)	1	0	0	1
2	United States (USA)	1	0	0	1
4	West Germany (FRG)	0	1	1	2
5	Ireland (IRL)	0	1	0	1
6	Great Britain (GBR)	0	0	1	1
Totals (6 entries)		3	3	3	9
