= Matyáš Novák =

Czech slalom canoeist (born 2005)

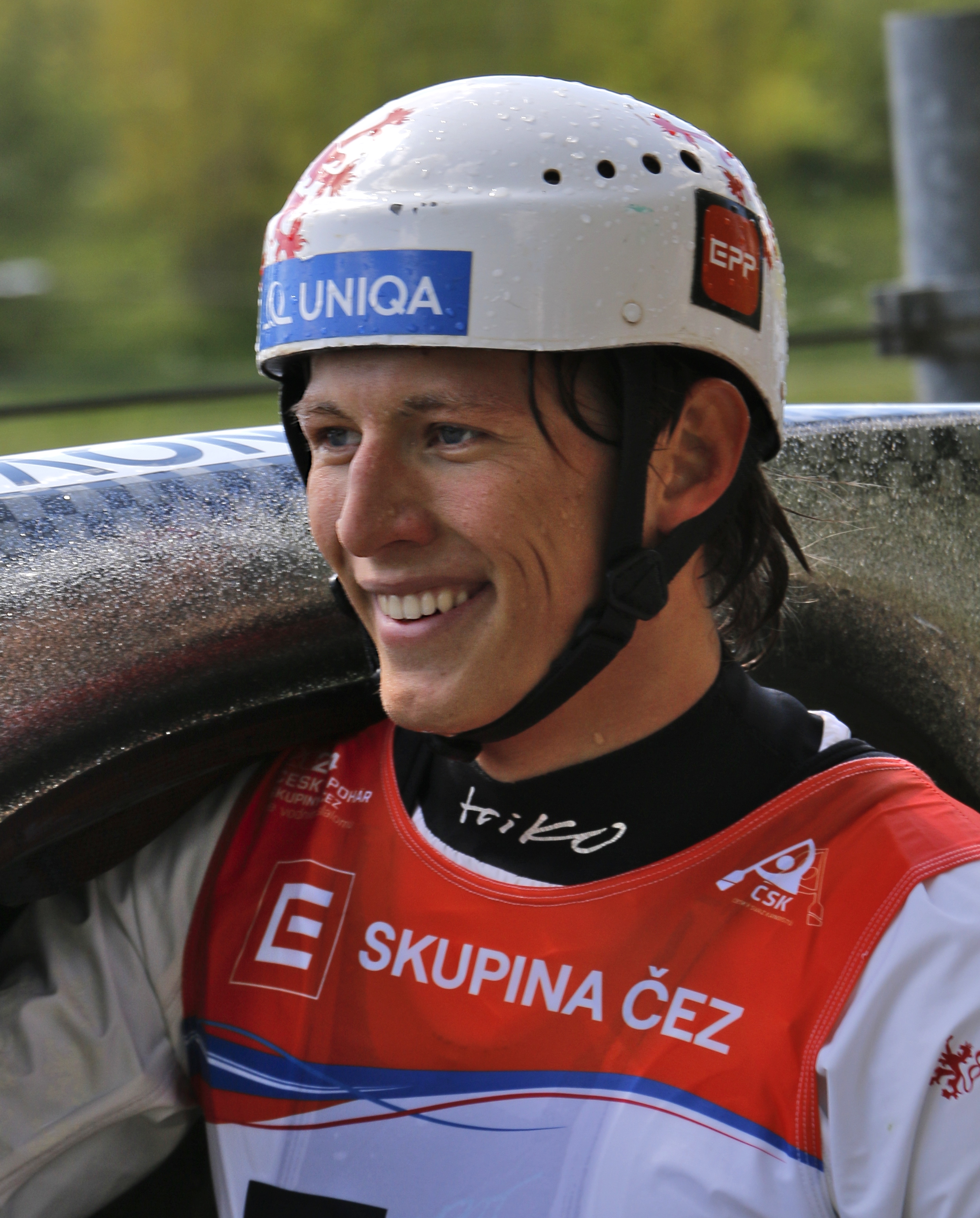

Personal information
- Nationality: Czech
- Born: 16 March 2005 (age 21)

Sport
- Country: Czechia
- Sport: Canoe slalom
- Event: K1, Kayak cross
Medal record
Men's canoe slalom
Representing the Czech Republic
World Championships
Bronze medal – third place	2025 Penrith	Kayak cross
European Championships
Gold medal – first place	2026 Ivrea	Kayak cross
Silver medal – second place	2026 Ivrea	K1 team
U23 World Championships
Silver medal – second place	2025 Foix	Kayak cross individual
Silver medal – second place	2026 Kraków	Kayak cross individual
Bronze medal – third place	2024 Liptovský Mikuláš	Kayak cross
Bronze medal – third place	2025 Foix	K1 team
Bronze medal – third place	2026 Kraków	K1 team
Junior World Championships
Silver medal – second place	2021 Tacen	K1 team
Bronze medal – third place	2023 Kraków	K1 team

Matyáš Novák (born 16 March 2005) is a Czech slalom canoeist who has competed at the international level since 2021, specializing in K1 and kayak cross.

He won a bronze medal in kayak cross at the 2025 ICF Canoe Slalom World Championships in Penrith. He also won one gold and one silver medal at the 2026 European Championships in Ivrea.

== World Cup individual podiums ==
Season	Date	Venue	Position	Event
2025	15 June 2025	Pau	3rd	Kayak cross individual
2025	15 June 2025	Pau	2nd	Kayak cross
2026	10 September 2026	La Seu d'Urgell	3rd	Kayak cross individual
