= Melanie Pfeifer =

German canoeist

Personal information
- Born: 25 August 1986 (age 40) Frankfurt
Medal record
Women's canoe slalom
Representing Germany
World Championships
Silver medal – second place	2010 Tacen	K1 team
Bronze medal – third place	2011 Bratislava	K1 team
Bronze medal – third place	2014 Deep Creek Lake	K1
Bronze medal – third place	2015 London	K1
European Championships
Gold medal – first place	2010 Bratislava	K1 team
Gold medal – first place	2012 Augsburg	K1 team
Gold medal – first place	2016 Liptovský Mikuláš	K1
Silver medal – second place	2012 Augsburg	K1
Silver medal – second place	2014 Vienna	K1
Silver medal – second place	2016 Liptovský Mikuláš	K1 team
Bronze medal – third place	2009 Nottingham	K1 team
U23 European Championships
Gold medal – first place	2005 Kraków	K1 team
Gold medal – first place	2006 Nottingham	K1 team
Gold medal – first place	2007 Kraków	K1
Gold medal – first place	2007 Kraków	K1 team
Gold medal – first place	2008 Solkan	K1
Gold medal – first place	2008 Solkan	K1 team
Silver medal – second place	2005 Kraków	K1
Silver medal – second place	2006 Nottingham	K1
Junior World Championships
Gold medal – first place	2004 Lofer	K1 team
Silver medal – second place	2004 Lofer	K1
Junior European Championships
Gold medal – first place	2003 Hohenlimburg	K1 team
Silver medal – second place	2003 Hohenlimburg	K1

Melanie Pfeifer (born 25 August 1986 in Frankfurt) is a German slalom canoeist who competed at the international level from 2003 to 2016.

She won four medals at the ICF Canoe Slalom World Championships with a silver (K1 team: 2010) and three bronzes (K1: 2014, 2015; K1 team: 2011). She also won 7 medals at the European Championships (3 golds, 3 silvers, and 1 bronze). At the 2016 Summer Olympics in Rio de Janeiro, she competed in the K1 event where she finished in 7th place.

== World Cup individual podiums ==
Season	Date	Venue	Position	Event
2009	28 Jun 2009	Pau	2nd	K1
2011	26 Jun 2011	Tacen	1st	K1
