= Lizzie Neave =

British slalom canoeist

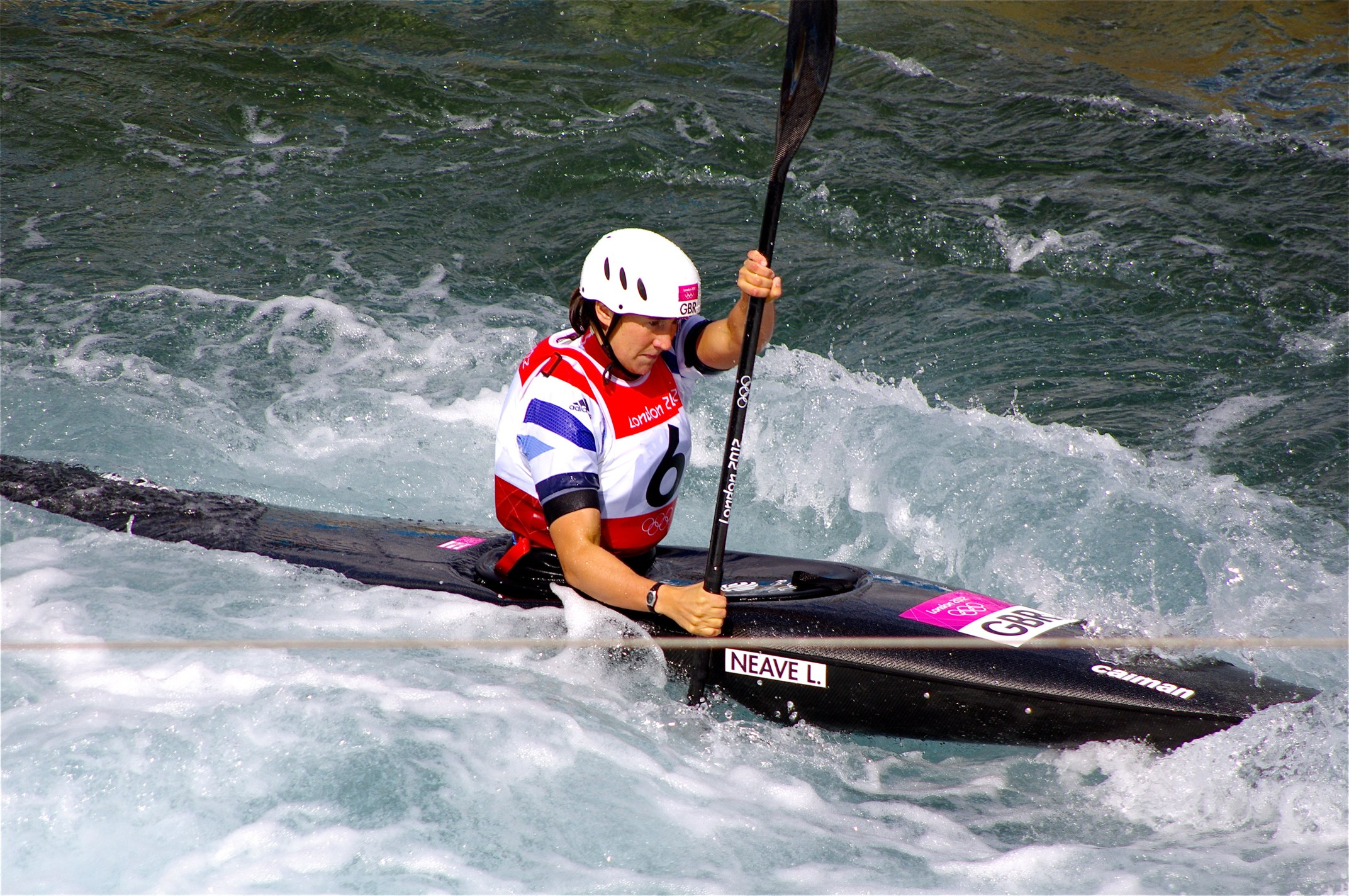
- Neave at the 2012 Summer Olympics

Medal record

Women's canoe slalom

Representing Great Britain

World Championships
Gold medal – first place	2009 La Seu d'Urgell	K1 team
Silver medal – second place	2015 London	K1 team
Bronze medal – third place	2007 Foz do Iguaçu	K1 team
Bronze medal – third place	2009 La Seu d'Urgell	K1

European Championships
Gold medal – first place	2009 Nottingham	K1 team
Gold medal – first place	2016 Liptovský Mikuláš	K1 team
Silver medal – second place	2013 Krakow	K1 team
Bronze medal – third place	2007 Liptovský Mikuláš	K1 team
Bronze medal – third place	2011 La Seu d'Urgell	K1

U23 European Championships
Silver medal – second place	2006 Nottingham	K1 team

Junior World Championships
Bronze medal – third place	2004 Lofer	K1 team

Elizabeth Rachael "Lizzie" Neave (born 12 June 1987 in Newcastle-under-Lyme) is a British slalom canoeist in women's kayak (K1W). She started competing in 1996 and first gained selection to represent Great Britain at junior level in 2002.

She won four medals at the ICF Canoe Slalom World Championships with a gold (K1 team: 2009), a silver (K1 team: 2015) and two bronzes (K1: 2009, K1 team: 2007). She also won 507 medals at the European Championships (2 golds, 1 silver and 2 bronzes) and four World Cup Medals (1 gold, 1 silver and 2 bronzes).

In 2012, Neave was selected for Great Britain at the London 2012 Olympics, after winning all three of the selection races. She finished 12th in the K1 event after being eliminated in the semifinal.

== World Cup individual podiums ==
Season	Date	Venue	Position	Event
2010	4 Jul 2011	Augsburg	3rd	K1
2012	17 Jun 2012	Pau	3rd	K1
2013	23 Jun 2013	Cardiff	1st	K1
2013	7 Jul 2013	La Seu d'Urgell	2nd	K1
