= Mewen Debliquy =

French slalom canoeist

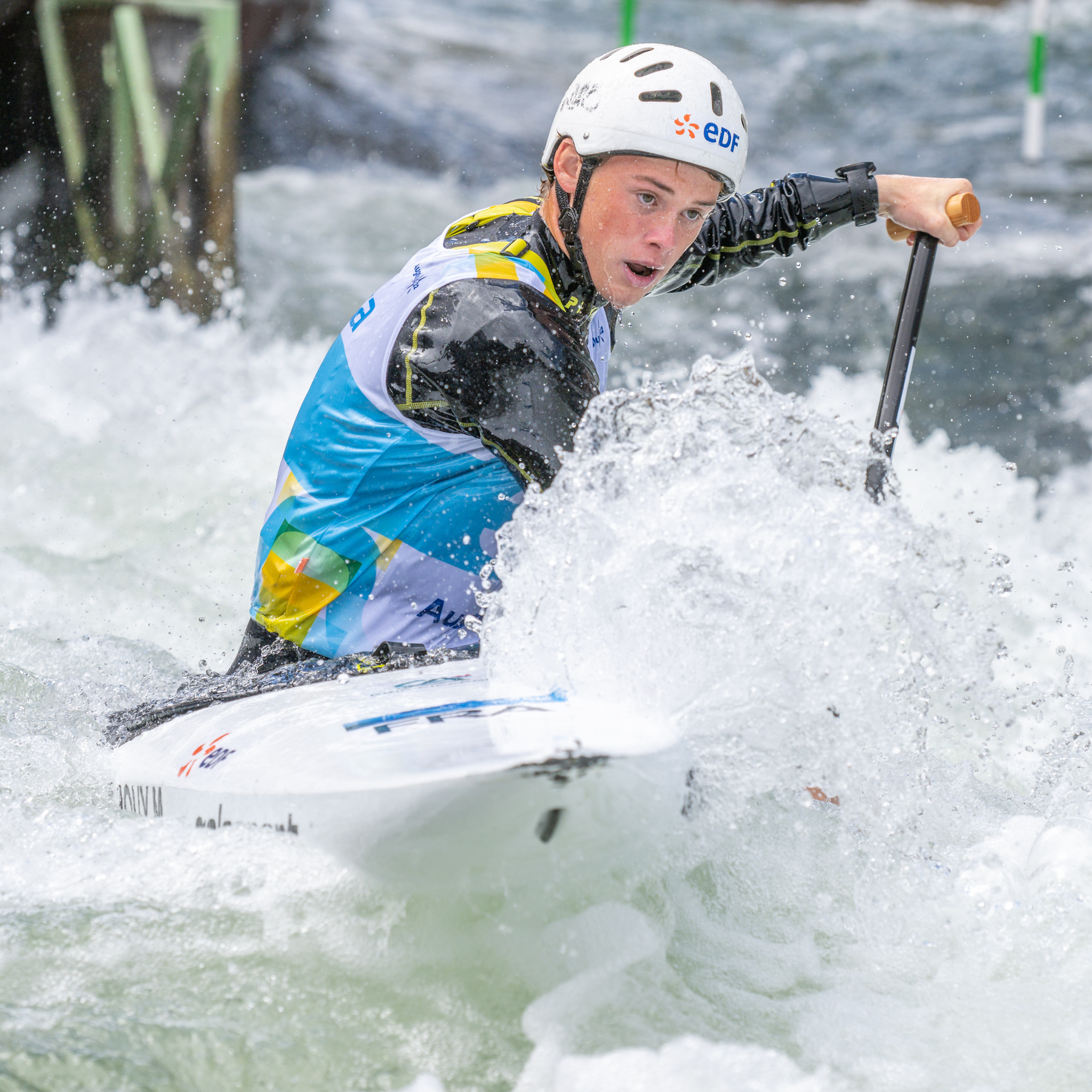

Personal information
- Nationality: French
- Born: 18 December 2003 (age 22)

Sport
- Country: France
- Sport: Canoe slalom
- Event: C1, K1
Medal record
Men's canoe slalom
Representing France
World Championships
Gold medal – first place	2025 Penrith	C1 team
U23 World Championships
Gold medal – first place	2022 Ivrea	C1
Gold medal – first place	2022 Ivrea	C1 team
Gold medal – first place	2023 Kraków	C1 team
Gold medal – first place	2026 Kraków	C1
Gold medal – first place	2026 Kraków	C1 team
Gold medal – first place	2026 Kraków	K1 team
Silver medal – second place	2025 Foix	C1 team
Bronze medal – third place	2024 Liptovský Mikuláš	C1 team
U23 European Championships
Gold medal – first place	2024 Kraków	C1
Gold medal – first place	2026 Épinal	K1 team
Silver medal – second place	2022 České Budějovice	C1
Silver medal – second place	2023 Bratislava	C1 team
Silver medal – second place	2024 Kraków	C1 team
Silver medal – second place	2026 Épinal	C1
Silver medal – second place	2026 Épinal	C1 team
Junior World Championships
Silver medal – second place	2021 Tacen	C1 team
Junior European Championships
Gold medal – first place	2020 Kraków	C1
Gold medal – first place	2021 Solkan	C1
Gold medal – first place	2021 Solkan	C1 team
Silver medal – second place	2020 Kraków	C1 team

Mewen Debliquy (born 18 December 2003) is a French slalom canoeist who has competed at the international level since 2020, specializing in the C1 event.

He won a gold medal in the C1 team event at the 2025 World Championships in Penrith.

== World Cup individual podiums ==
Season	Date	Venue	Position	Event
2025	28 June 2025	Prague	2nd	C1
