= 1988 World Junior Canoe Slalom Championships =

The 1988 ICF World Junior Canoe Slalom Championships were the 2nd edition of the ICF World Junior Canoe Slalom Championships. The event took place in La Seu d'Urgell, Spain from 8 to 10 July 1988 under the auspices of the International Canoe Federation (ICF). This was a natural whitewater course at the time, two years before the construction of the artificial Segre Olympic Park that would be used for the 1992 Summer Olympics.

Four medal events took place. No team events were held.

== Medal summary ==
=== Men ===
==== Canoe ====
Event	Gold		Silver		Bronze	
C1	Gareth Marriott (GBR)	217.90	Michael Dötsch (FRG)	224.28	Adam Clawson (USA)	224.75
C2	Brian Holden/Jason Bennett (GBR)	258.57	Juraj Mikuš/Marcel Kollár (TCH)	259.27	Marek Lubušký/Martin Král (TCH)	266.95

==== Kayak ====
Event	Gold		Silver		Bronze	
K1	Scott Shipley (USA)	195.33	Claudio Roviera (ITA)	203.08	Andraž Vehovar (YUG)	203.16

=== Women ===
==== Kayak ====
Event	Gold		Silver		Bronze	
K1	Sandra Berger (FRG)	237.15	Lara Tipper (GBR)	242.32	Katja Sosnowski (FRG)	244.96

== Medal table ==
Rank	Nation	Gold	Silver	Bronze	Total
1	Great Britain (GBR)	2	1	0	3
2	West Germany (FRG)	1	1	1	3
3	United States (USA)	1	0	1	2
4	Czechoslovakia (TCH)	0	1	1	2
5	Italy (ITA)	0	1	0	1
6	Yugoslavia (YUG)	0	0	1	1
Totals (6 entries)		4	4	4	12
