= Michal Buchtel =

Czech slalom canoeist

Personal information
- Born: 19 December 1986 (age 39)
Medal record
Men's canoe slalom
Representing Czech Republic
World Championships
Gold medal – first place	2009 La Seu d'Urgell	K1 team
Junior World Championships
Gold medal – first place	2002 Nowy Sącz	K1 team
Silver medal – second place	2004 Lofer	K1
Bronze medal – third place	2004 Lofer	K1 team
Junior European Championships
Gold medal – first place	2004 Kraków	K1
Silver medal – second place	2003 Hohenlimburg	K1 team

Michal Buchtel (born 19 December 1986) is a Czech slalom canoeist who competed at the international level from 2002 to 2011.

He won a gold medal in the K1 team event at the 2009 ICF Canoe Slalom World Championships in La Seu d'Urgell.
