= Kai Müller =

German canoeist

Personal information
- Born: 20 July 1988 (age 37) Magdeburg, East Germany
Medal record
Men's canoe slalom
Representing Germany
World Championships
Silver medal – second place	2015 London	C2 team
Bronze medal – third place	2010 Tacen	C2 team
European Championships
Silver medal – second place	2011 La Seu d'Urgell	C2 team
Bronze medal – third place	2012 Augsburg	C2 team
Bronze medal – third place	2013 Kraków	C2 team
Bronze medal – third place	2016 Liptovský Mikuláš	C2 team
U23 European Championships
Gold medal – first place	2009 Liptovský Mikuláš	C2
Gold medal – first place	2010 Markkleeberg	C2 team
Silver medal – second place	2009 Liptovský Mikuláš	C2 team
Junior World Championships
Silver medal – second place	2006 Solkan	C2
Junior European Championships
Gold medal – first place	2005 Kraków	C2 team
Silver medal – second place	2004 Kraków	C2

Kai Müller (born 20 July 1988 in Magdeburg) is a German slalom canoeist who has competed at the international level since 2004, exclusively in the C2 class alongside his twin brother Kevin.

He won two medals in the C2 team event at the ICF Canoe Slalom World Championships with a silver in 2015 and a bronze in 2010. He also won a silver and three bronzes in the same event at the European Championships.
