= Petra Slováková =

Czech canoeist

Personal information
- Nationality: Czech
- Born: 1979 (age 46–47) Czech Republic

Sport
- Sport: Canoeing
- Event: Wildwater canoeing
- Club: KK Opava
Medal record
Event	1st	2nd	3rd
World Championships	0	1	1
European Championships	0	0	2
Total	0	1	3

Petra Slováková (born 1979) is a Czech female canoeist who won four medals at individual senior level at the Wildwater Canoeing World Championships and European Wildwater Championships.
