= List of ICF World Under 23 Canoe Slalom Championships medalists =

This is a list of medalists from the ICF World Junior and U23 Canoe Slalom Championships in the under 23 category.

== Individual ==
=== Canoe Single (C1) Men ===
Championships	Gold	Silver	Bronze
2012 Wausau	Roberto Colazingari (ITA)	Franz Anton (GER)	Anže Berčič (SLO)
2013 Liptovský Mikuláš	Patrik Gajarský (SVK)	Martin Říha (CZE)	Jerguš Baďura (SVK)
2014 Penrith	Roberto Colazingari (ITA)	Luka Božič (SLO)	Thomas Quinn (GBR)
2015 Foz do Iguaçu	Adam Burgess (GBR)	Paolo Ceccon (ITA)	Felipe Borges (BRA)
2016 Kraków	Florian Breuer (GER)	Lukáš Rohan (CZE)	Kirill Setkin (RUS)
2017 Bratislava	Marko Mirgorodský (SVK)	Václav Chaloupka (CZE)	Florian Breuer (GER)
2018 Ivrea	Václav Chaloupka (CZE)	Raffaello Ivaldi (ITA)	Cédric Joly (FRA)
2019 Kraków	Nicolas Gestin (FRA)	Lucas Roisin (FRA)	Liam Jegou (IRL)
2021 Tacen	Nicolas Gestin (FRA)	Jules Bernardet (FRA)	Václav Chaloupka (CZE)
2022 Ivrea	Mewen Debliquy (FRA)	Kacper Sztuba (POL)	Vojtěch Heger (CZE)
2023 Kraków	Jules Bernardet (FRA)	Kurts Rozentals (GBR)	Nejc Polenčič (SLO)
2024 Liptovský Mikuláš	Manuel Trípano (ARG)	Yohann Senechault (FRA)	Lukáš Kratochvíl (CZE)
2025 Foix	Lukáš Kratochvíl (CZE)	Oliver Puchner (NZL)	Alex Segura (ESP)
2026 Kraków	Mewen Debliquy (FRA)	Lukáš Kratochvíl (CZE)	Elio Maiutto (ITA)

=== Canoe Double (C2) Men ===
Discontinued: 2017.

Championships	Gold	Silver	Bronze
2012 Wausau	Robert Behling/Thomas Becker (GER)	Ondřej Karlovský/Jakub Jáně (CZE)	Michał Wiercioch/Grzegorz Majerczak (POL)
2013 Liptovský Mikuláš (non-medal event)	Lukáš Rohan/Adam Svoboda (CZE)	Jonáš Kašpar/Marek Šindler (CZE)	Filip Brzeziński/Andrzej Brzeziński (POL)
2014 Penrith	Jonáš Kašpar/Marek Šindler (CZE)	Filip Brzeziński/Andrzej Brzeziński (POL)	Aleksei Popov/Vadim Voinalovich (RUS)
2015 Foz do Iguaçu	Michał Wiercioch/Grzegorz Majerczak (POL)	Juraj Skákala/Matúš Gewissler (SVK)	Charles Corrêa/Anderson Oliveira (BRA)
2016 Kraków	Filip Brzeziński/Andrzej Brzeziński (POL)	Michał Wiercioch/Grzegorz Majerczak (POL)	Yves Prigent/Loïc Kervella (FRA)
2017 Bratislava	Matúš Gewissler/Juraj Skákala (SVK)	Nikolay Shkliaruk/Igor Mikhailov (RUS)	Vojtěch Heger/Tomáš Heger (CZE)

=== Kayak (K1) Men ===
Championships	Gold	Silver	Bronze
2012 Wausau	Jiří Prskavec (CZE)	Lukas Mayr (ITA)	Richard Powell (USA)
2013 Liptovský Mikuláš	Mathieu Biazizzo (FRA)	Jiří Prskavec (CZE)	Giovanni De Gennaro (ITA)
2014 Penrith	Michal Smolen (USA)	Giovanni De Gennaro (ITA)	Jiří Prskavec (CZE)
2015 Foz do Iguaçu	Jiří Prskavec (CZE)	David Llorente (ESP)	Andrej Málek (SVK)
2016 Kraków	Jakub Grigar (SVK)	Zeno Ivaldi (ITA)	Andrej Málek (SVK)
2017 Bratislava	Jakub Grigar (SVK)	Mario Leitner (AUT)	Mathieu Desnos (FRA)
2018 Ivrea	Jakob Weger (ITA)	Bradley Forbes-Cryans (GBR)	Erik Holmer (SWE)
2019 Kraków	Pol Oulhen (FRA)	Mathurin Madoré (FRA)	Mario Leitner (AUT)
2021 Tacen	Jakub Krejčí (CZE)	Jonny Dickson (GBR)	Christopher Bowers (GBR)
2022 Ivrea	Anatole Delassus (FRA)	Felix Oschmautz (AUT)	Jonny Dickson (GBR)
2023 Kraków	Leo Vuitton (FRA)	Anatole Delassus (FRA)	Titouan Castryck (FRA)
2024 Liptovský Mikuláš	Anatole Delassus (FRA)	Jakub Krejčí (CZE)	Lan Tominc (SLO)
2025 Foix	Titouan Castryck (FRA)	Xabier Ferrazzi (ITA)	Manel Contreras (ESP)
2026 Kraków	Sam Leaver (GBR)	Faust Clotet Juanmarti (ESP)	Michele Pistoni (ITA)

=== Kayak Cross Men ===
Championships	Gold	Silver	Bronze
2018 Ivrea	Dimitri Marx (SUI)	Malo Quéméneur (FRA)	Nikita Inkin (RUS)
2019 Kraków	Sergey Maimistov (RUS)	Matthias Weger (AUT)	Tine Kancler (SLO)
2021 Tacen	Dimitri Marx (SUI)	Jan Rohrer (SUI)	Jakub Brzeziński (POL)
2022 Ivrea	Gaël Adisson (FRA)	Etienne Chappell (GBR)	Jan Rohrer (SUI)
2023 Kraków	Sam Leaver (GBR)	Nicholas Collier (NZL)	Jonny Dickson (GBR)
2024 Liptovský Mikuláš	Gaël Adisson (FRA)	Anatole Delassus (FRA)	Matyáš Novák (CZE)
2025 Foix	Nicholas Collier (NZL)	Titouan Castryck (FRA)	Xabier Ferrazzi (ITA)
2026 Kraków	Ianis Triomphe (FRA)	Miquel Farran (ESP)	Thomas Mayer (GBR)

=== Kayak Cross Individual Men ===
Championships	Gold	Silver	Bronze
2025 Foix	Sam Leaver (GBR)	Matyáš Novák (CZE)	Jakub Krejčí (CZE)
2026 Kraków	Enrico Dietz (GER)	Matyáš Novák (CZE)	Manel Contreras (ESP)

=== Canoe Single (C1) Women ===
Championships	Gold	Silver	Bronze
2012 Wausau	Rosalyn Lawrence (AUS)	Monika Jančová (CZE)	Alice Spencer (GBR)
2013 Liptovský Mikuláš	Jessica Fox (AUS)	Viktoria Wolffhardt (AUT); Viktoriia Us (UKR)	-
2014 Penrith	Jessica Fox (AUS)	Monika Jančová (CZE)	Núria Vilarrubla (ESP)
2015 Foz do Iguaçu	Núria Vilarrubla (ESP)	Mallory Franklin (GBR)	Kimberley Woods (GBR)
2016 Kraków	Jessica Fox (AUS)	Kimberley Woods (GBR)	Viktoria Wolffhardt (AUT)
2017 Bratislava	Mallory Franklin (GBR)	Tereza Fišerová (CZE)	Kimberley Woods (GBR)
2018 Ivrea	Nadine Weratschnig (AUT)	Kimberley Woods (GBR)	Noemie Fox (AUS)
2019 Kraków	Ana Sátila (BRA)	Alsu Minazova (RUS)	Monika Škáchová (SVK)
2021 Tacen	Bethan Forrow (GBR)	Emanuela Luknárová (SVK)	Elena Apel (GER)
2022 Ivrea	Elena Borghi (ITA)	Gabriela Satková (CZE)	Emanuela Luknárová (SVK)
2023 Kraków	Soňa Stanovská (SVK)	Tereza Kneblová (CZE)	Evy Leibfarth (USA)
2024 Liptovský Mikuláš	Gabriela Satková (CZE)	Marta Bertoncelli (ITA)	Eva Alina Hočevar (SLO)
2025 Foix	Evy Leibfarth (USA)	Zuzana Paňková (SVK)	Eva Alina Hočevar (SLO)
2026 Kraków	Lucie Krech (GER)	Elena Micozzi (ITA)	Wu Yishan (CHN)

=== Kayak (K1) Women ===
Championships	Gold	Silver	Bronze
2012 Wausau	Kateřina Kudějová (CZE)	Cindy Pöschel (GER)	Nouria Newman (FRA)
2013 Liptovský Mikuláš	Kateřina Kudějová (CZE)	Stefanie Horn (ITA)	Lisa Fritsche (GER)
2014 Penrith	Jessica Fox (AUS)	Li Lu (CHN)	Bethan Latham (GBR)
2015 Foz do Iguaçu	Jessica Fox (AUS)	Ana Sátila (BRA)	Lisa Leitner (AUT)
2016 Kraków	Jessica Fox (AUS)	Karolína Galušková (CZE)	Lisa Fritsche (GER)
2017 Bratislava	Jessica Fox (AUS)	Ana Sátila (BRA)	Klaudia Zwolińska (POL)
2018 Ivrea	Camille Prigent (FRA)	Lisa Leitner (AUT)	Kimberley Woods (GBR)
2019 Kraków	Amálie Hilgertová (CZE)	Klaudia Zwolińska (POL)	Selina Jones (GER)
2021 Tacen	Coline Charel (FRA)	Romane Prigent (FRA)	Ria Sribar (USA)
2022 Ivrea	Eliška Mintálová (SVK)	Emma Vuitton (FRA)	Mònica Dòria Vilarrubla (AND)
2023 Kraków	Evy Leibfarth (USA)	Antonie Galušková (CZE)	Coline Charel (FRA)
2024 Liptovský Mikuláš	Lois Leaver (GBR)	Eva Alina Hočevar (SLO)	Kateřina Beková (CZE)
2025 Foix	Eva Alina Hočevar (SLO)	Evy Leibfarth (USA)	Lois Leaver (GBR)
2026 Kraków	Paulina Pirro (GER)	Leire Goñi (ESP)	Bára Galušková (CZE)

=== Kayak Cross Women ===
Championships	Gold	Silver	Bronze
2018 Ivrea	Ana Sátila (BRA)	Selina Jones (GER)	Amálie Hilgertová (CZE)
2019 Kraków	Ana Sátila (BRA)	Amálie Hilgertová (CZE)	Tereza Fišerová (CZE)
2021 Tacen	Nikita Setchell (GBR)	Martina Satková (CZE)	Antonie Galušková (CZE)
2022 Ivrea	Nikita Setchell (GBR)	Naemi Brändle (SUI)	Mònica Dòria Vilarrubla (AND)
2023 Kraków	Kateřina Beková (CZE)	Angèle Hug (FRA)	Alena Marx (SUI)
2024 Liptovský Mikuláš	Emma Vuitton (FRA)	Leire Goñi (ESP)	Kateřina Beková (CZE)
2025 Foix	Doriane Delassus (FRA)	Lois Leaver (GBR)	Kateřina Beková (CZE)
2026 Kraków	Tereza Kneblová (CZE)	Fia Bütikofer (SUI)	Lucia Pistoni (ITA)

=== Kayak Cross Individual Women ===
Championships	Gold	Silver	Bronze
2025 Foix	Zuzana Paňková (SVK)	Olga Samková (CZE)	Tereza Kneblová (CZE)
2026 Kraków	Tereza Kneblová (CZE)	Leire Goñi (ESP)	Dominika Brzeska (POL)

=== Canoe Double (C2) Mixed ===
Championships	Gold	Silver	Bronze
2017 Bratislava	Alsu Minazova/Aleksei Popov (RUS)	Daria Shaidurova/Mikhail Kruglov (RUS)	Theo Roisin/Angèle Hug (FRA)
2018 Ivrea	Miren Lazkano/David Llorente (ESP)	Elizaveta Terekhova/Igor Mikhailov (RUS)	Wu Wenpeng/Yan Jiahua (CHN)
2019 Kraków	Jana Matulková/Vojtěch Mrůzek (CZE)	Vojtěch Heger/Antonie Galušková (CZE)	Daria Shaidurova/Igor Mikhailov (RUS)

== Teams ==
=== Canoe Single (C1) Men Teams ===
Championships	Gold	Silver	Bronze
2012 Wausau	Slovenia; Anže Berčič; Jure Lenarčič; Blaž Cof	France; Martin Thomas; Simon Le Friec; Thibaud Vielliard	Czech Republic; Jan Busta; Tomáš Rak; Martin Říha
2013 Liptovský Mikuláš	Slovenia; Jure Lenarčič; Luka Božič; Anže Berčič	Poland; Wojciech Pasiut; Kacper Gondek; Arkadiusz Nieć	France; Maxime Perron; Simon Le Friec; Kilian Foulon
2014 Penrith	Russia; Ruslan Sayfiev; Kirill Setkin; Roman Malyshev	Slovakia; Patrik Gajarský; Jerguš Baďura; Tomáš Džurný	France; Cédric Joly; Kilian Foulon; Thibaut Perroteau
2015 Foz do Iguaçu	Italy; Raffaello Ivaldi; Roberto Colazingari; Paolo Ceccon	Great Britain; Adam Burgess; Thomas Abbott; Samuel Ibbotson	Czech Republic; Lukáš Rohan; Martin Říha; Jakub Mrůzek
2016 Kraków	France; Cédric Joly; Thibault Blaise; Erwan Marchais	Great Britain; Ryan Westley; Samuel Ibbotson; William Smith	Germany; Florian Breuer; Dennis Söter; Florian Beste
2017 Bratislava	Czech Republic; Václav Chaloupka; Lukáš Rohan; Jan Větrovský	Great Britain; Samuel Ibbotson; Thomas Abbott; William Smith	France; Cédric Joly; Lucas Roisin; Erwan Marchais
2018 Ivrea	Germany; Lennard Tuchscherer; Leon Hanika; Timo Trummer	France; Cédric Joly; Lucas Roisin; Valentin Marteil	Great Britain; Thomas Abbott; William Smith; Samuel Ibbotson
2019 Kraków	Italy; Raffaello Ivaldi; Paolo Ceccon; Flavio Micozzi	Slovakia; Marko Mirgorodský; Martin Dodok; Ľudovít Macúš	Czech Republic; Vojtěch Heger; Václav Chaloupka; Jan Větrovský
2021 Tacen	Slovenia; Nejc Polenčič; Juš Javornik; Urh Turnšek	Czech Republic; Václav Chaloupka; Vojtěch Heger; Matyáš Lhota	France; Nicolas Gestin; Jules Bernardet; Alexis Bobon
2022 Ivrea	France; Mewen Debliquy; Jules Bernardet; Adrien Fischer	Poland; Kacper Sztuba; Szymon Nowobilski; Konrad Szymanek	Slovenia; Nejc Polenčič; Juš Javornik; Žiga Lin Hočevar
2023 Kraków	France; Mewen Debliquy; Jules Bernardet; Yohann Senechault	Great Britain; James Kettle; Peter Linksted; Kurts Rozentals	Italy; Martino Barzon; Flavio Micozzi; Elio Maiutto
2024 Liptovský Mikuláš	Czech Republic; Adam Král; Martin Kratochvíl; Lukáš Kratochvíl	Slovenia; Nejc Polenčič; Juš Javornik; Žiga Lin Hočevar	France; Mewen Debliquy; Yohann Senechault; Tanguy Adisson
2025 Foix	Czech Republic; Adam Král; Lukáš Kratochvíl; Martin Kratochvíl	France; Elouan Debliquy; Mewen Debliquy; Yohann Senechault	Germany; Konrad Ginzel; Philipp Süß; Benjamin Kies
2026 Kraków	France; Martin Cornu; Mewen Debliquy; Titouan Estanguet	Czech Republic; Lukáš Kratochvíl; Adam Král; Martin Kratochvíl	Spain; Alex Segura; Oier Díaz; Marc Vicente

=== Canoe Double (C2) Men Teams ===
Discontinued: 2017.

Championships	Gold	Silver	Bronze
2012 Wausau	Czech Republic; Ondřej Karlovský/Jakub Jáně; Jonáš Kašpar/Marek Šindler; Jaroslav Strnad/Martin Říha	Great Britain; Thomas Quinn/George Tatchell; Matthew Lister/Rhys Davies; Adam Burgess/Greg Pitt	Germany; Robert Behling/Thomas Becker; Hans Krüger/Paul Sommer; Aaron Jüttner/Piet Lennart Wagner
2013 Liptovský Mikuláš	Czech Republic; Ondřej Karlovský/Jakub Jáně; Jonáš Kašpar/Marek Šindler; Lukáš Rohan/Adam Svoboda	Poland; Filip Brzeziński/Andrzej Brzeziński; Michał Wiercioch/Grzegorz Majerczak; Dariusz Chlebek/Dominik Węglarz	France; Jimy Berçon/Marc Biazizzo; Yves Prigent/Loïc Kervella; Nicolas Scianimanico/Hugo Cailhol
2014 Penrith (non-medal event)	Poland; Filip Brzeziński/Andrzej Brzeziński; Michał Wiercioch/Grzegorz Majerczak; Wojciech Pasiut/Kacper Gondek	Czech Republic; Jonáš Kašpar/Marek Šindler; Michael Matějka/Jan Větrovský; Jan Mrázek/Tomáš Rousek	Brazil; Anderson Oliveira/Charles Corrêa; Wallan De Carvalho/Welton De Carvalho; Maicon de Borba/Carlos Moraes
2015 Foz do Iguaçu (non-medal event)	Brazil; Charles Corrêa/Anderson Oliveira; Pedro Aversa/Rafael de Souza; Felipe Borges/Fábio Rodrigues	-	-
2016 Kraków (non-medal event)	Russia; Vadim Voinalovich/Aleksei Popov; Igor Mikhailov/Nikolay Shkliaruk; Dmitriy Azanov/Egor Gover	Poland; Filip Brzeziński/Andrzej Brzeziński; Michał Wiercioch/Grzegorz Majerczak; Michał Woś/Hubert Wawryk	Czech Republic; Michael Matějka/Jan Větrovský; Jan Mrázek/Tomáš Rousek; Mikuláš Zapletal/Vojtěch Zapletal
2017 Bratislava (non-medal event)	Russia; Nikolay Shkliaruk/Igor Mikhailov; Vadim Voinalovich/Aleksei Popov; Alexander Ovchinikov/Egor Gover	Czech Republic; Vojtěch Heger/Tomáš Heger; Vít Pohanka/Denis Wendl; Vojtěch Mrůzek/Albert Kašpar	-

=== Kayak (K1) Men Teams ===
Championships	Gold	Silver	Bronze
2012 Wausau	Italy; Lukas Mayr; Zeno Ivaldi; Giovanni De Gennaro	France; Vivien Colober; Thomas Rosset; Yann Le Govic	Czech Republic; Jiří Prskavec; Vít Přindiš; Ondřej Tunka
2013 Liptovský Mikuláš	Germany; Tobias Kargl; Fabian Schweikert; Stefan Hengst	Great Britain; Thomas Brady; Joe Clarke; Michael Wilson	Slovakia; Martin Halčin; Miroslav Urban; Matúš Hujsa
2014 Penrith	Poland; Rafał Polaczyk; Michał Pasiut; Maciej Okręglak	Great Britain; Thomas Brady; Joe Clarke; Steffan Walker	Slovakia; Martin Halčin; Andrej Málek; Miroslav Urban
2015 Foz do Iguaçu	Czech Republic; Jiří Prskavec; Ondřej Cvikl; Petr Binčík	Poland; Rafał Polaczyk; Maciej Okręglak; Jakub Brzeziński	Brazil; Pedro Gonçalves; Fábio Rodrigues; Guilherme Mapelli
2016 Kraków	Germany; Stefan Hengst; Leo Bolg; Samuel Hegge	Slovakia; Jakub Grigar; Andrej Málek; Richard Macúš	Spain; Jordi Cadena; Telmo Olazabal; Unai Nabaskues
2017 Bratislava	Germany; Stefan Hengst; Samuel Hegge; Thomas Strauss	Slovenia; Žan Jakše; Martin Srabotnik; Vid Kuder Marušič	France; Mathurin Madoré; Pol Oulhen; Mathieu Desnos
2018 Ivrea	France; Mathurin Madoré; Malo Quéméneur; Clément Travert	Italy; Marcello Beda; Davide Ghisetti; Jakob Weger	Austria; Mario Leitner; Felix Oschmautz; Matthias Weger
2019 Kraków	France; Mathurin Madoré; Malo Quéméneur; Pol Oulhen	Slovenia; Niko Testen; Žan Jakše; Vid Kuder Marušič	Spain; David Llorente; Unai Nabaskues; Manuel Ochoa
2021 Tacen	Czech Republic; Jakub Krejčí; Jan Bárta; Tomáš Zima	France; Anatole Delassus; Malo Quéméneur; Simon Hene	Germany; Noah Hegge; Tim Bremer; Thomas Strauss
2022 Ivrea	Italy; Leonardo Grimandi; Davide Ghisetti; Giacomo Barzon	Spain; Miquel Travé; Pau Echaniz; Darío Cuesta	France; Anatole Delassus; Pierre Louis Saussereau; Simon Hene
2023 Kraków	France; Leo Vuitton; Titouan Castryck; Anatole Delassus	Spain; Pau Echaniz; Alex Goñi; Manel Contreras	Italy; Xabier Ferrazzi; Tommaso Barzon; Leonardo Grimandi
2024 Liptovský Mikuláš	France; Leo Vuitton; Anatole Delassus; Edgar Paleau-Brasseur	Great Britain; Sam Leaver; Ben Haylett; Jonny Dickson	Italy; Xabier Ferrazzi; Gabriele Grimandi; Tommaso Panico
2025 Foix	Great Britain; Jonah Hanrahan; Sam Leaver; Thomas Mayer	France; Titouan Castryck; Martin Cornu; Noe Perreau	Czech Republic; Jakub Krejčí; Matyáš Novák; Martin Rudorfer
2026 Kraków	France; Martin Cornu; Mewen Debliquy; Titouan Estanguet	Italy; Xabier Ferrazzi; Michele Pistoni; Gabriele Grimandi	Czech Republic; Matyáš Novák; Michal Kopeček; Martin Rudorfer

=== Canoe Single (C1) Women Teams ===
Championships	Gold	Silver	Bronze
2012 Wausau	Australia; Jessica Fox; Rosalyn Lawrence; Alison Borrows	Germany; Lena Stöcklin; Karolin Wagner; Birgit Ohmayer	Great Britain; Eilidh Gibson; Mallory Franklin; Kimberley Woods
2013 Liptovský Mikuláš	Great Britain; Emily Woodcock; Mallory Franklin; Jasmine Royle	Spain; Núria Vilarrubla; Miren Lazkano; Annebel van der Knijff	Australia; Jessica Fox; Alison Borrows; Margaret Webster
2014 Penrith (non-medal event)	Czech Republic; Monika Jančová; Martina Satková; Anna Koblencová	Great Britain; Mallory Franklin; Jasmine Royle; Eilidh Gibson	New Zealand; Jane Nicholas; Haylee Dangen; Kelly Travers
2015 Foz do Iguaçu	Spain; Núria Vilarrubla; Annebel van der Knijff; Klara Olazabal	Czech Republic; Jana Matulková; Monika Jančová; Anna Koblencová	Great Britain; Kimberley Woods; Mallory Franklin; Jasmine Royle
2016 Kraków	Great Britain; Kimberley Woods; Jasmine Royle; Eilidh Gibson	France; Lucie Prioux; Cécile Tixier; Laurine Naveau	Australia; Jessica Fox; Noemie Fox; Georgia Rankin
2017 Bratislava	Great Britain; Mallory Franklin; Kimberley Woods; Eilidh Gibson	Spain; Klara Olazabal; Miren Lazkano; Annebel van der Knijff	Czech Republic; Tereza Fišerová; Martina Satková; Jana Matulková
2018 Ivrea	Spain; Miren Lazkano; Klara Olazabal; Annebel van der Knijff	Slovenia; Eva Alina Hočevar; Lea Novak; Nina Bizjak	Czech Republic; Tereza Fišerová; Jana Matulková; Martina Satková
2019 Kraków	Czech Republic; Tereza Fišerová; Eva Říhová; Martina Satková	France; Lucie Prioux; Marjorie Delassus; Margaux Henry	Australia; Noemie Fox; Kate Eckhardt; Demelza Wall
2021 Tacen	Czech Republic; Martina Satková; Gabriela Satková; Eva Říhová	France; Angèle Hug; Doriane Delassus; Fanchon Janssen	Slovakia; Simona Glejteková; Soňa Stanovská; Emanuela Luknárová
2022 Ivrea	Czech Republic; Gabriela Satková; Eva Říhová; Tereza Kneblová	Italy; Elena Borghi; Marta Bertoncelli; Carolina Massarenti	Great Britain; Bethan Forrow; Sophie Ogilvie; Ellis Miller
2023 Kraków	Czech Republic; Eva Říhová; Gabriela Satková; Tereza Kneblová	France; Angèle Hug; Doriane Delassus; Laurène Roisin	Italy; Elena Borghi; Marta Bertoncelli; Elena Micozzi
2024 Liptovský Mikuláš	Italy; Marta Bertoncelli; Elena Micozzi; Elena Borghi	Germany; Kimberley Rappe; Lucie Krech; Jannemien Panzlaff	Spain; Nora López; Clara González; Izar García
2025 Foix	Germany; Kimberley Rappe; Jannemien Panzlaff; Lucie Krech	Czech Republic; Adriana Morenová; Tereza Kneblová; Olga Samková	France; Doriane Delassus; Zoe Laurent; Nina Pesce-Roue
2026 Kraków	Czech Republic; Tereza Kneblová; Adriana Morenová; Anna Fabianová	China; Liu Gaoyi; Xu Jiaqi; Wu Yishan	Italy; Elena Micozzi; Isabel Lovato; Vittoria Cuignon

=== Kayak (K1) Women Teams ===
Championships	Gold	Silver	Bronze
2012 Wausau	Czech Republic; Kateřina Kudějová; Eva Ornstová; Pavlína Zástěrová	Great Britain; Natalie Wilson; Bethan Latham; Hannah Burgess	France; Lucie Baudu; Estelle Mangin; Nouria Newman
2013 Liptovský Mikuláš	Czech Republic; Kateřina Kudějová; Veronika Vojtová; Pavlína Zástěrová	Germany; Ricarda Funk; Fee Maxeiner; Lisa Fritsche	Russia; Polina Mukhgaleeva; Elena Solodovnikova; Uliana Galkina
2014 Penrith	Great Britain; Kimberley Woods; Bethan Latham; Mallory Franklin	Czech Republic; Karolína Galušková; Pavlína Zástěrová; Barbora Valíková	Australia; Jessica Fox; Alison Borrows; Georgia Rankin
2015 Foz do Iguaçu	Austria; Viktoria Wolffhardt; Lisa Leitner; Nina Weratschnig	Australia; Jessica Fox; Alison Borrows; Georgia Rankin	Czech Republic; Karolína Galušková; Barbora Valíková; Sabina Foltysová
2016 Kraków	Germany; Lisa Fritsche; Caroline Trompeter; Selina Jones	Czech Republic; Karolína Galušková; Amálie Hilgertová; Barbora Valíková	France; Lucie Baudu; Camille Prigent; Solène Graille
2017 Bratislava	Czech Republic; Karolína Galušková; Amálie Hilgertová; Barbora Valíková	Great Britain; Mallory Franklin; Kimberley Woods; Gabrielle Ridge	Australia; Jessica Fox; Noemie Fox; Kate Eckhardt
2018 Ivrea	Slovakia; Eliška Mintálová; Michaela Haššová; Lucia Murzová	Czech Republic; Amálie Hilgertová; Karolína Galušková; Kateřina Dušková	Great Britain; Kimberley Woods; Megan Hamer-Evans; Sophie Ogilvie
2019 Kraków	France; Camille Prigent; Romane Prigent; Marjorie Delassus	Czech Republic; Amálie Hilgertová; Tereza Fišerová; Gabriela Satková	Germany; Anna Faber; Stella Mehlhorn; Selina Jones
2021 Tacen	France; Angèle Hug; Romane Prigent; Coline Charel	Slovakia; Soňa Stanovská; Michaela Haššová; Kristína Ďurecová	Germany; Elena Apel; Franziska Hanke; Nele Gosse
2022 Ivrea	Czech Republic; Antonie Galušková; Gabriela Satková; Lucie Nesnídalová	Germany; Annkatrin Plochmann; Emily Apel; Franziska Hanke	France; Emma Vuitton; Romane Prigent; Angèle Hug
2023 Kraków	Great Britain; Phoebe Spicer; Lois Leaver; Ellis Miller	Czech Republic; Lucie Nesnídalová; Antonie Galušková; Gabriela Satková	Slovenia; Eva Alina Hočevar; Lea Novak; Sara Belingar
2024 Liptovský Mikuláš	Germany; Antonia Plochmann; Emily Apel; Annkatrin Plochmann	France; Emma Vuitton; Ilona Martin Laemle; Eva Pietracha	Czech Republic; Lucie Nesnídalová; Kateřina Beková; Klára Kneblová
2025 Foix	Czech Republic; Lucie Nesnídalová; Kateřina Beková; Klára Mrázková	France; Emma Vuitton; Doriane Delassus; Nina Pesce-Roue	United States; Evy Leibfarth; Ria Sribar; Marcella Altman
2026 Kraków	Spain; Leire Goñi; Anna Simona; Haizea Segura	Germany; Paulina Pirro; Antonia Plochmann; Mina Blume	France; Ilona Martin Laemle; Nina Pesce-Roue; Camille Brugvin
