= 2014 Canoe Slalom World Cup =

The 2014 Canoe Slalom World Cup was a series of five races in 5 canoeing and kayaking categories organized by the International Canoe Federation (ICF). It was the 27th edition.

== Calendar ==
The series opened with World Cup Race 1 in Lee Valley, England (June 6–8) and ended with the World Cup Final in Augsburg, Germany (August 15–17).

Label	Venue	Date
World Cup Race 1	(United Kingdom) Lee Valley	6–8 June
World Cup Race 2	(Slovenia) Tacen	13–15 June
World Cup Race 3	(Czech Republic) Prague	20–22 June
World Cup Race 4	(Spain) La Seu d'Urgell	1–3 August
World Cup Final	(Germany) Augsburg	15–17 August

== Final standings ==
The winner of each race was awarded 60 points (double points were awarded for the World Cup Final). Points for lower places differed from one category to another. Every participant was guaranteed at least 2 points for participation and 5 points for qualifying for the semifinal run (4 and 10 points in the World Cup Final respectively). If two or more athletes or boats were equal on points, the ranking was determined by their positions in the World Cup Final.

=== C1 men ===
Pos	Athlete	Points
1	Michal Martikán (SVK)	307
2	David Florence (GBR)	292
3	Matej Beňuš (SVK)	290
4	Alexander Slafkovský (SVK)	274
5	Benjamin Savšek (SLO)	216
6	Denis Gargaud Chanut (FRA)	196
7	Vítězslav Gebas (CZE)	196
8	Anže Berčič (SLO)	178
9	Jan Mašek (CZE)	168
10	Fabien Lefèvre (USA)	160

=== C1 women ===
Pos	Athlete	Points
1	Kateřina Hošková (CZE)	294
2	Rosalyn Lawrence (AUS)	281
3	Mallory Franklin (GBR)	261
4	Jessica Fox (AUS)	198
5	Monika Jančová (CZE)	182
6	Julia Schmid (AUT)	181
7	Teng Qianqian (CHN)	139
8	Eilidh Gibson (GBR)	114
9	Alison Borrows (AUS)	108
10	Cen Nanqin (CHN)	98

=== C2 men ===
Pos	Athletes	Points
1	Ladislav Škantár/Peter Škantár (SVK)	290
2	Franz Anton/Jan Benzien (GER)	258
3	Luka Božič/Sašo Taljat (SLO)	243
4	Robert Behling/Thomas Becker (GER)	217
5	David Florence/Richard Hounslow (GBR)	214
6	Piotr Szczepański/Marcin Pochwała (POL)	198
7	Ondřej Karlovský/Jakub Jáně (CZE)	189
8	Jonáš Kašpar/Marek Šindler (CZE)	182
9	Gauthier Klauss/Matthieu Péché (FRA)	165
10	Tomáš Kučera/Ján Bátik (SVK)	93

=== K1 men ===
Pos	Athlete	Points
1	Sebastian Schubert (GER)	272
2	Vít Přindiš (CZE)	249
3	Hannes Aigner (GER)	231
4	Joe Clarke (GBR)	218
5	Boris Neveu (FRA)	193
6	Jiří Prskavec (CZE)	186
7	Alexander Grimm (GER)	181
8	Fabian Dörfler (GER)	174
9	Samuel Hernanz (ESP)	173
10	Martin Albreht (SLO)	163

=== K1 women ===
Pos	Athlete	Points
1	Corinna Kuhnle (AUT)	280
2	Jana Dukátová (SVK)	270
3	Ricarda Funk (GER)	257
4	Jasmin Schornberg (GER)	230
5	Štěpánka Hilgertová (CZE)	213
6	Urša Kragelj (SLO)	211
7	Sarah Grant (AUS)	184
8	Luuka Jones (NZL)	173
9	Jessica Fox (AUS)	166
10	Marie-Zélia Lafont (FRA)	155

== Results ==
=== World Cup Race 1 ===
The first race of the season took place at the Lee Valley White Water Centre, England from 6 to 8 June.

Event	Gold	Score	Silver	Score	Bronze	Score
C1 men	David Florence (GBR)	99.87	Matej Beňuš (SVK)	103.20	Michal Martikán (SVK)	103.82
C1 women	Mallory Franklin (GBR)	122.44	Eilidh Gibson (GBR)	132.24	Teng Qianqian (CHN)	134.87
C2 men	Slovenia; Luka Božič; Sašo Taljat	106.57	Germany; Franz Anton; Jan Benzien	108.83	Slovakia; Ladislav Škantár; Peter Škantár	109.39
K1 men	Boris Neveu (FRA)	95.19	Vít Přindiš (CZE)	97.53	Mateusz Polaczyk (POL)	97.70
K1 women	Li Lu (CHN)	110.64	Corinna Kuhnle (AUT)	111.03	Jessica Fox (AUS)	111.18
C1 men team	Great Britain; David Florence; Thomas Quinn; Ryan Westley	113.21	Slovakia; Michal Martikán; Alexander Slafkovský; Karol Rozmuš	113.29	Slovenia; Benjamin Savšek; Anže Berčič; Luka Božič	116.15
C1 women team	Great Britain; Mallory Franklin; Jasmine Royle; Eilidh Gibson	176.28	China; Cen Nanqin; Teng Qianqian; Chen Shi	177.93	France; Caroline Loir; Oriane Rebours; Claire Jacquet	217.54
C2 men team	Great Britain; David Florence & Richard Hounslow; Rhys Davies & Matthew Lister; Adam Burgess & Greg Pitt	135.62	Czech Republic; Ondřej Karlovský & Jakub Jáně; Tomáš Koplík & Jakub Vrzáň; Jonáš Kašpar & Marek Šindler	232.19	-	
K1 men team	Great Britain; Richard Hounslow; Joe Clarke; Thomas Brady	108.71	France; Boris Neveu; Étienne Daille; Mathieu Biazizzo	110.39	Spain; Joan Crespo; Samuel Hernanz; Alberto Díez-Canedo	112.45
K1 women team	Great Britain; Fiona Pennie; Bethan Latham; Mallory Franklin	134.78	France; Carole Bouzidi; Nouria Newman; Émilie Fer	140.20	Spain; Maialen Chourraut; Irati Goikoetxea; Marta Martínez	144.31

=== World Cup Race 2 ===
The second race of the season took place at the Tacen Whitewater Course, Slovenia from 13 to 15 June.

Event	Gold	Score	Silver	Score	Bronze	Score
C1 men	Benjamin Savšek (SLO)	104.94	Michal Martikán (SVK)	106.06	Luka Božič (SLO)	106.54
C1 women	Jessica Fox (AUS)	120.69	Kateřina Hošková (CZE)	136.12	Teng Qianqian (CHN)	141.52
C2 men	Slovakia; Ladislav Škantár; Peter Škantár	111.24	Slovenia; Luka Božič; Sašo Taljat	112.50	Czech Republic; Jonáš Kašpar; Marek Šindler	116.46
K1 men	Fabian Dörfler (GER)	97.12	Andrea Romeo (ITA)	97.32	Sebastian Schubert (GER)	98.51
K1 women	Jana Dukátová (SVK)	111.24	Jasmin Schornberg (GER)	113.83	Corinna Kuhnle (AUT)	114.14
C1 men team	Australia; Robin Jeffery; Ian Borrows; Christian Fabris	128.53	France; Pierre-Antoine Tillard; Martin Thomas; Cédric Joly	135.57	Czech Republic; Lukáš Rohan; Vítězslav Gebas; Jan Mašek	137.04
C1 women team	China; Cen Nanqin; Teng Qianqian; Chen Shi	262.44	-		-	
C2 men team	Germany; Robert Behling & Thomas Becker; Kai Müller & Kevin Müller; Franz Anton & Jan Benzien	139.49	-		-	
K1 men team	Germany; Sebastian Schubert; Fabian Dörfler; Alexander Grimm	109.52	France; Benjamin Renia; Benoît Peschier; Benoît Guillaume	111.51	Poland; Mateusz Polaczyk; Rafał Polaczyk; Dariusz Popiela	112.34
K1 women team	Germany; Jasmin Schornberg; Melanie Pfeifer; Ricarda Funk	130.54	France; Marie-Zélia Lafont; Pauline Guiet; Josepha Longa	145.57	Slovenia; Urša Kragelj; Eva Terčelj; Ajda Novak	151.33

=== World Cup Race 3 ===
The third race of the season took place at the Prague-Troja Canoeing Centre, Czech Republic from 20 to 22 June.

Event	Gold	Score	Silver	Score	Bronze	Score
C1 men	Michal Martikán (SVK)	93.56	David Florence (GBR)	95.43	Benjamin Savšek (SLO)	95.59
C1 women	Rosalyn Lawrence (AUS)	117.19	Kateřina Hošková (CZE)	124.47	Cen Nanqin (CHN)	128.30
C2 men	Slovakia; Ladislav Škantár; Peter Škantár	102.30	Poland; Piotr Szczepański; Marcin Pochwała	104.46	Slovenia; Luka Božič; Sašo Taljat	104.63
K1 men	Hannes Aigner (GER)	87.16	Jiří Prskavec (CZE)	90.35	Michal Smolen (USA)	92.06
K1 women	Ricarda Funk (GER)	99.38	Kateřina Kudějová (CZE)	99.80	Štěpánka Hilgertová (CZE)	103.20
C1 men team	Czech Republic; Lukáš Rohan; Vítězslav Gebas; Jan Mašek	109.37	Germany; Sideris Tasiadis; Jan Benzien; Franz Anton	109.90	Great Britain; David Florence; Mark Proctor; Adam Burgess	110.02
C1 women team	Czech Republic; Kateřina Hošková; Monika Jančová; Martina Satková	152.67	China; Cen Nanqin; Teng Qianqian; Chen Shi	178.12	Great Britain; Kimberley Woods; Jasmine Royle; Eilidh Gibson	229.54
C2 men team	Czech Republic; Ondřej Karlovský & Jakub Jáně; Jonáš Kašpar & Marek Šindler; Michael Matějka & Jan Větrovský	138.83	Poland; Piotr Szczepański & Marcin Pochwała; Filip Brzeziński & Andrzej Brzeziński; Michał Wiercioch & Grzegorz Majerczak	179.92	Germany; Robert Behling & Thomas Becker; Kai Müller & Kevin Müller; Franz Anton & Jan Benzien	187.68
K1 men team	Germany; Sebastian Schubert; Fabian Dörfler; Alexander Grimm	102.59	Italy; Daniele Molmenti; Andrea Romeo; Giovanni De Gennaro	103.07	Czech Republic; Jiří Prskavec; Vít Přindiš; Ondřej Tunka	104.99
K1 women team	Czech Republic; Štěpánka Hilgertová; Kateřina Kudějová; Veronika Vojtová	121.06	Australia; Jessica Fox; Sarah Grant; Rosalyn Lawrence	121.43	Russia; Ekaterina Perova; Marta Kharitonova; Aleksandra Perova	127.76

=== World Cup Race 4 ===
The penultimate race of the series took place at the Segre Olympic Park in La Seu d'Urgell, Spain from 1 to 3 August. There were no team events held here.

Event	Gold	Score	Silver	Score	Bronze	Score
C1 men	Alexander Slafkovský (SVK)	98.06	Matej Beňuš (SVK)	98.48	Michal Martikán (SVK)	99.16
C1 women	Jessica Fox (AUS)	111.26	Núria Vilarrubla (ESP)	119.09	Rosalyn Lawrence (AUS)	123.39
C2 men	Slovakia; Ladislav Škantár; Peter Škantár	106.70	France; Pierre Labarelle; Nicolas Peschier	107.41	France; Pierre Picco; Hugo Biso	108.16
K1 men	Samuel Hernanz (ESP)	92.18	Boris Neveu (FRA)	92.24	Sébastien Combot (FRA)	92.65
K1 women	Maialen Chourraut (ESP)	103.36	Corinna Kuhnle (AUT)	104.02	Émilie Fer (FRA)	105.33

=== World Cup Final ===
The final race of the series took place at the Augsburg Eiskanal, Germany from 15 to 17 August.

Event	Gold	Score	Silver	Score	Bronze	Score
C1 men	Denis Gargaud Chanut (FRA)	97.75	David Florence (GBR)	98.57	Matej Beňuš (SVK)	100.07
C1 women	Mallory Franklin (GBR)	114.73	Rosalyn Lawrence (AUS)	120.75	Kateřina Hošková (CZE)	121.25
C2 men	France; Gauthier Klauss; Matthieu Péché	108.80	Germany; Franz Anton; Jan Benzien	109.50	Great Britain; David Florence; Richard Hounslow	109.69
K1 men	Sebastian Schubert (GER)	92.35	Joe Clarke (GBR)	95.49	Mathieu Biazizzo (FRA)	96.71
K1 women	Ricarda Funk (GER)	104.52	Štěpánka Hilgertová (CZE)	106.49	Karolína Galušková (CZE)	107.14
C1 men team	United States; Fabien Lefèvre; Casey Eichfeld; Zachary Lokken	118.43	Poland; Grzegorz Hedwig; Arkadiusz Nieć; Igor Sztuba	118.87	Slovakia; Michal Martikán; Alexander Slafkovský; Karol Rozmuš	123.61
C1 women team	Great Britain; Mallory Franklin; Jasmine Royle; Eilidh Gibson	175.18	France; Caroline Loir; Lucie Baudu; Cécile Tixier	198.80	Germany; Lena Stöcklin; Karolin Wagner; Elena Apel	240.86
C2 men team	Germany; Robert Behling & Thomas Becker; Kai Müller & Kevin Müller; Franz Anton & Jan Benzien	132.58	France; Gauthier Klauss & Matthieu Péché; Nicolas Scianimanico & Hugo Cailhol; Yves Prigent & Loïc Kervella	133.57	Czech Republic; Ondřej Karlovský & Jakub Jáně; Jonáš Kašpar & Marek Šindler; Tomáš Koplík & Jakub Vrzáň	134.90
K1 men team	France; Mathieu Biazizzo; Sébastien Combot; Boris Neveu	105.03	Germany; Sebastian Schubert; Fabian Dörfler; Alexander Grimm	106.46	Switzerland; Michael Kurt; Lukas Werro; Martin Dougoud	107.37
K1 women team	Germany; Jasmin Schornberg; Melanie Pfeifer; Ricarda Funk	121.23	Great Britain; Fiona Pennie; Bethan Latham; Mallory Franklin	124.59	Czech Republic; Štěpánka Hilgertová; Kateřina Kudějová; Veronika Vojtová	127.66
