= 2015 Canoe Slalom World Cup =

The 2015 Canoe Slalom World Cup was a series of five races in 5 canoeing and kayaking categories organized by the International Canoe Federation (ICF). It was the 28th edition.

== Calendar ==
The series opened with World Cup Race 1 in Prague, Czech Republic (June 19–21) and closed with the World Cup Final in Pau, France (August 14–16).

Label	Venue	Date
World Cup Race 1	(Czech Republic) Prague	19–21 June
World Cup Race 2	(Poland) Kraków	26–28 June
World Cup Race 3	(Slovakia) Liptovský Mikuláš	3–5 July
World Cup Race 4	(Spain) La Seu d'Urgell	7–9 August
World Cup Final	(France) Pau	14–16 August

== Final standings ==
The winner of each race was awarded 60 points (double points were awarded for the World Cup Final for all the competitors who reached at least the semifinal stage). Points for lower places differed from one category to another. Every participant was guaranteed at least 2 points for participation and 5 points for qualifying for the semifinal run (10 points in the World Cup Final). If two or more athletes or boats were equal on points, the ranking was determined by their positions in the World Cup Final.

=== C1 men ===
Pos	Athlete	Points
1	Matej Beňuš (SVK)	299
2	Benjamin Savšek (SLO)	246
3	Alexander Slafkovský (SVK)	231
4	Michal Martikán (SVK)	224
5	David Florence (GBR)	201
6	Denis Gargaud Chanut (FRA)	198
7	Luka Božič (SLO)	194
8	Stanislav Ježek (CZE)	192
9	Pierre-Antoine Tillard (FRA)	177
10	Sideris Tasiadis (GER)	176

=== C1 women ===
Pos	Athlete	Points
1	Jessica Fox (AUS)	318
2	Kateřina Hošková (CZE)	246
3	Viktoria Wolffhardt (AUT)	245
4	Núria Vilarrubla (ESP)	199
5	Lucie Baudu (FRA)	198
6	Viktoriia Dobrotvorska (UKR)	184
7	Ana Sátila (BRA)	153
8	Julia Schmid (AUT)	147
9	Jasmine Royle (GBR)	144
10	Rosalyn Lawrence (AUS)	131

=== C2 men ===
Pos	Athletes	Points
1	Gauthier Klauss/Matthieu Péché (FRA)	306
2	Jonáš Kašpar/Marek Šindler (CZE)	276
3	Ondřej Karlovský/Jakub Jáně (CZE)	265
4	Piotr Szczepański/Marcin Pochwała (POL)	175
5	Luka Božič/Sašo Taljat (SLO)	171
6	Robert Behling/Thomas Becker (GER)	164
7	Pierre Labarelle/Nicolas Peschier (FRA)	152
8	Ladislav Škantár/Peter Škantár (SVK)	150
9	Tomáš Kučera/Ján Bátik (SVK)	140
10	Yves Prigent/Loïc Kervella (FRA)	139

=== K1 men ===
Pos	Athlete	Points
1	Peter Kauzer (SLO)	257
2	Lucien Delfour (AUS)	236
3	Ondřej Tunka (CZE)	230
4	Boris Neveu (FRA)	215
5	Vavřinec Hradilek (CZE)	205
6	Mathieu Biazizzo (FRA)	195
7	Joe Clarke (GBR)	191
8	Martin Halčin (SVK)	189
9	Mateusz Polaczyk (POL)	177
10	Thomas Bersinger (ARG)	174

=== K1 women ===
Pos	Athlete	Points
1	Corinna Kuhnle (AUT)	264
2	Jana Dukátová (SVK)	264
3	Jessica Fox (AUS)	252
4	Maialen Chourraut (ESP)	250
5	Kateřina Kudějová (CZE)	242
6	Jasmin Schornberg (GER)	216
7	Eva Terčelj (SLO)	209
8	Ricarda Funk (GER)	202
9	Émilie Fer (FRA)	197
10	Marta Martínez (ESP)	154

== Results ==
=== World Cup Race 1 ===
The first race of the series took place at the Prague-Troja Canoeing Centre, Czech Republic from 19 to 21 June.

Event	Gold	Score	Silver	Score	Bronze	Score
C1 men	Stanislav Ježek (CZE)	90.68	Benjamin Savšek (SLO)	91.25	David Florence (GBR)	92.33
C1 women	Kateřina Hošková (CZE)	112.43	Jessica Fox (AUS)	113.35	Ana Sátila (BRA)	116.82
C2 men	France; Gauthier Klauss; Matthieu Péché	98.60	Czech Republic; Ondřej Karlovský; Jakub Jáně	99.69	Czech Republic; Jonáš Kašpar; Marek Šindler	99.89
K1 men	Jiří Prskavec (CZE)	88.74	Boris Neveu (FRA)	89.29	Ondřej Tunka (CZE)	90.66
K1 women	Jasmin Schornberg (GER)	98.03	Jessica Fox (AUS)	98.16	Kateřina Kudějová (CZE)	99.15
C1 men team	Czech Republic; Michal Jáně; Stanislav Ježek; Tomáš Rak	108.38	Great Britain; David Florence; Ryan Westley; Adam Burgess	108.59	Germany; Sideris Tasiadis; Nico Bettge; Franz Anton	110.09
C1 women team	Czech Republic; Kateřina Hošková; Monika Jančová; Tereza Fišerová	141.32	Germany; Karolin Wagner; Lena Stöcklin; Rebecca Jüttner	154.49	Austria; Julia Schmid; Viktoria Wolffhardt; Nadine Weratschnig	154.97
C2 men team	Poland; Piotr Szczepański & Marcin Pochwała; Filip Brzeziński & Andrzej Brzeziński; Michał Wiercioch & Grzegorz Majerczak	115.52	Czech Republic; Ondřej Karlovský & Jakub Jáně; Jonáš Kašpar & Marek Šindler; Tomáš Koplík & Jakub Vrzáň	117.24	Germany; Franz Anton & Jan Benzien; Robert Behling & Thomas Becker; Kai Müller & Kevin Müller	120.74
K1 men team	Poland; Mateusz Polaczyk; Maciej Okręglak; Dariusz Popiela	99.04	Czech Republic; Jiří Prskavec; Vavřinec Hradilek; Ondřej Tunka	99.38	Slovenia; Peter Kauzer; Janoš Peterlin; Simon Brus	120.74
K1 women team	Czech Republic; Karolína Galušková; Kateřina Kudějová; Štěpánka Hilgertová	115.23	Slovenia; Urša Kragelj; Eva Terčelj; Ajda Novak	119.71	Australia; Jessica Fox; Rosalyn Lawrence; Alison Borrows	122.24

=== World Cup Race 2 ===
The second race of the series took place at the Kraków-Kolna Canoe Slalom Course, Poland from 26 to 28 June. There were no team events here.

Event	Gold	Score	Silver	Score	Bronze	Score
C1 men	Matej Beňuš (SVK)	83.33	David Florence (GBR)	86.19	Benjamin Savšek (SLO)	86.22
C1 women	Jessica Fox (AUS)	103.19	Kimberley Woods (GBR)	106.38	Viktoriia Dobrotvorska (UKR)	111.34
C2 men	Czech Republic; Jonáš Kašpar; Marek Šindler	93.16	Germany; Robert Behling; Thomas Becker	94.99	France; Pierre-Antoine Tillard; Edern Le Ruyet	98.13
K1 men	Vavřinec Hradilek (CZE)	81.39	Martin Halčin (SVK)	81.51	Mathieu Biazizzo (FRA)	81.85
K1 women	Maialen Chourraut (ESP)	90.91	Corinna Kuhnle (AUT)	92.89	Ricarda Funk (GER)	93.97

=== World Cup Race 3 ===
The third race of the series took place at the Ondrej Cibak Whitewater Slalom Course in Liptovský Mikuláš, Slovakia from 3 to 5 July.

Event	Gold	Score	Silver	Score	Bronze	Score
C1 men	Michal Martikán (SVK)	95.47	Alexander Slafkovský (SVK)	95.49	Stanislav Ježek (CZE)	96.78
C1 women	Mallory Franklin (GBR)	114.40	Viktoria Wolffhardt (AUT)	117.28	Viktoriia Dobrotvorska (UKR)	125.55
C2 men	Slovakia; Pavol Hochschorner; Peter Hochschorner	102.63	France; Gauthier Klauss; Matthieu Péché	102.84	Poland; Piotr Szczepański; Marcin Pochwała	104.11
K1 men	Mathieu Biazizzo (FRA)	88.86	Vavřinec Hradilek (CZE)	91.34	Peter Kauzer (SLO)	92.35
K1 women	Jana Dukátová (SVK)	101.01	Maialen Chourraut (ESP)	103.11	Marta Martínez (ESP)	103.68
C1 men team	Slovakia; Michal Martikán; Alexander Slafkovský; Matej Beňuš	105.57	Slovenia; Benjamin Savšek; Luka Božič; Anže Berčič	110.19	Poland; Grzegorz Hedwig; Kacper Gondek; Igor Sztuba	111.06
C1 women team	Czech Republic; Kateřina Hošková; Monika Jančová; Tereza Fišerová	141.03	Great Britain; Kimberley Woods; Mallory Franklin; Eilidh Gibson	142.60	France; Lucie Baudu; Claire Jacquet; Ella Bregazzi	148.45
C2 men team	Czech Republic; Ondřej Karlovský & Jakub Jáně; Jonáš Kašpar & Marek Šindler; Tomáš Koplík & Jakub Vrzáň	116.98	Poland; Piotr Szczepański & Marcin Pochwała; Filip Brzeziński & Andrzej Brzeziński; Michał Wiercioch & Grzegorz Majerczak	124.78	France; Hugo Cailhol & Nicolas Scianimanico; Gauthier Klauss & Matthieu Péché; Yves Prigent & Loïc Kervella	126.02
K1 men team	Australia; Lucien Delfour; Daniel Watkins; Jaxon Merritt	104.77	Poland; Mateusz Polaczyk; Maciej Okręglak; Dariusz Popiela	105.21	Slovenia; Peter Kauzer; Janoš Peterlin; Simon Brus	105.72
K1 women team	Slovakia; Elena Kaliská; Jana Dukátová; Kristína Zárubová	118.88	Czech Republic; Karolína Galušková; Kateřina Kudějová; Veronika Vojtová	122.55	Australia; Jessica Fox; Kate Eckhardt; Noemie Fox	123.68

=== World Cup Race 4 ===
The penultimate race of the series took place at the Segre Olympic Park in La Seu d'Urgell, Spain from 7 to 9 August. There were no team events here.

Event	Gold	Score	Silver	Score	Bronze	Score
C1 men	Denis Gargaud Chanut (FRA)	92.08	Matej Beňuš (SVK)	94.10	Benjamin Savšek (SLO)	95.03
C1 women	Jessica Fox (AUS)	110.51	Kateřina Hošková (CZE)	117.58	Kimberley Woods (GBR)	119.30
C2 men	France; Gauthier Klauss; Matthieu Péché	100.79	France; Pierre Labarelle; Nicolas Peschier	101.07	Great Britain; David Florence; Richard Hounslow	101.46
K1 men	Boris Neveu (FRA)	89.06	Samuel Hernanz (ESP)	89.61	Lucien Delfour (AUS)	90.50
K1 women	Corinna Kuhnle (AUT)	97.33	Maialen Chourraut (ESP)	98.93	Marta Martínez (ESP)	99.56

=== World Cup Final ===
The final race of the series took place at the Pau-Pyrénées Whitewater Stadium, France from 14 to 16 August.

Event	Gold	Score	Silver	Score	Bronze	Score
C1 men	Pierre-Antoine Tillard (FRA)	97.30	Matej Beňuš (SVK)	97.83	Denis Gargaud Chanut (FRA)	99.09
C1 women	Núria Vilarrubla (ESP)	124.26	Jessica Fox (AUS)	125.85	Viktoria Wolffhardt (AUT)	127.08
C2 men	Czech Republic; Jonáš Kašpar; Marek Šindler	107.65	France; Gauthier Klauss; Matthieu Péché	109.32	France; Yves Prigent; Loïc Kervella	109.88
K1 men	Peter Kauzer (SLO)	96.20	Mathieu Doby (BEL)	96.21	Lucien Delfour (AUS)	96.22
K1 women	Émilie Fer (FRA)	103.53	Jessica Fox (AUS)	103.90	Corinna Kuhnle (AUT)	106.48
C1 men team	France; Nicolas Peschier; Pierre-Antoine Tillard; Martin Thomas	108.24	Slovenia; Benjamin Savšek; Luka Božič; Jure Lenarčič	118.13	Great Britain; David Florence; Ryan Westley; Adam Burgess	118.26
C1 women team	Spain; Núria Vilarrubla; Annebel van der Knijff; Miren Lazkano	193.40	Great Britain; Kimberley Woods; Jasmine Royle; Eilidh Gibson	219.32	Australia; Jessica Fox; Rosalyn Lawrence; Alison Borrows	313.88
C2 men team	Great Britain; David Florence & Richard Hounslow; Rhys Davies & Matthew Lister; Adam Burgess & Greg Pitt	125.86	Russia; Dmitry Larionov & Mikhail Kuznetsov; Alexei Suslov & Maxim Obraztsov; Anton Ushakov & Artem Ushakov	136.83	Brazil; Charles Corrêa & Anderson Oliveira; Pedro Aversa & Rafael de Souza; Felipe Borges & Fábio Rodrigues	300.63
K1 men team	France; Mathieu Biazizzo; Vivien Colober; Boris Neveu	103.93	Great Britain; Richard Hounslow; Joe Clarke; Bradley Forbes-Cryans	106.48	Slovenia; Peter Kauzer; Janoš Peterlin; Simon Brus	109.27
K1 women team	Spain; Maialen Chourraut; Irati Goikoetxea; Marta Martínez	119.72	Austria; Violetta Oblinger-Peters; Corinna Kuhnle; Viktoria Wolffhardt	119.89	Great Britain; Fiona Pennie; Kimberley Woods; Lizzie Neave	125.40
