= Luka Bozic =

Luka Bozic may refer to:

- Luka Božič (born 1991), Slovenian slalom canoeist
- Luka Božić (born 1996), Croatian basketball player
