= Marek Šindler =

Czech slalom canoeist (born 1992)

Personal information
- Born: 21 July 1992 (age 34) Opava
Medal record
Men's canoe slalom
Representing Czech Republic
World Championships
Gold medal – first place	2013 Prague	C2 team
Bronze medal – third place	2014 Deep Creek Lake	C2 team
European Championships
Gold medal – first place	2018 Prague	C2
Silver medal – second place	2012 Augsburg	C2 team
Silver medal – second place	2015 Markkleeberg	C2 team
Silver medal – second place	2018 Prague	C2 team
Bronze medal – third place	2014 Vienna	C2 team
Bronze medal – third place	2017 Tacen	C2
Bronze medal – third place	2017 Tacen	C2 team
U23 World Championships
Gold medal – first place	2012 Wausau	C2 team
Gold medal – first place	2013 Liptovský Mikuláš	C2 team
Gold medal – first place	2014 Penrith	C2
U23 European Championships
Gold medal – first place	2011 Banja Luka	C2 team
Gold medal – first place	2013 Bourg-Saint-Maurice	C2
Silver medal – second place	2010 Markkleeberg	C2 team
Silver medal – second place	2012 Solkan	C2 team
Junior World Championships
Gold medal – first place	2008 Roudnice nad Labem	C2 team
Junior European Championships
Gold medal – first place	2008 Solkan	C2 team
Gold medal – first place	2009 Liptovský Mikuláš	C2
Silver medal – second place	2009 Liptovský Mikuláš	C2 team

Marek Šindler (Czech pronunciation: [ˈmarɛk ˈʃɪndlɛr]; born 21 July 1992 in Opava) is a Czech slalom canoeist who has competed at the international level since 2007.

He won two medals in the C2 team event at the ICF Canoe Slalom World Championships with a gold in 2013 and a bronze in 2014. He also won one gold, three silvers and three bronzes at the European Championships. He finished 8th in the C2 event at the 2016 Summer Olympics in Rio de Janeiro.

His partner in the C2 boat is Jonáš Kašpar.

== World Cup individual podiums ==
Season	Date	Venue	Position	Event
2013	25 Aug 2013	Bratislava	2nd	C2
2014	15 Jun 2014	Tacen	3rd	C2
2015	21 Jun 2015	Prague	3rd	C2
2015	28 Jun 2015	Kraków	1st	C2
2015	16 Aug 2015	Pau	1st	C2
2017	17 Jun 2017	Prague	1st	C2
2017	24 Jun 2017	Augsburg	2nd	C2
2017	1 Jul 2017	Markkleeberg	1st	C2
