= Matúš Gewissler =

Slovak canoeist

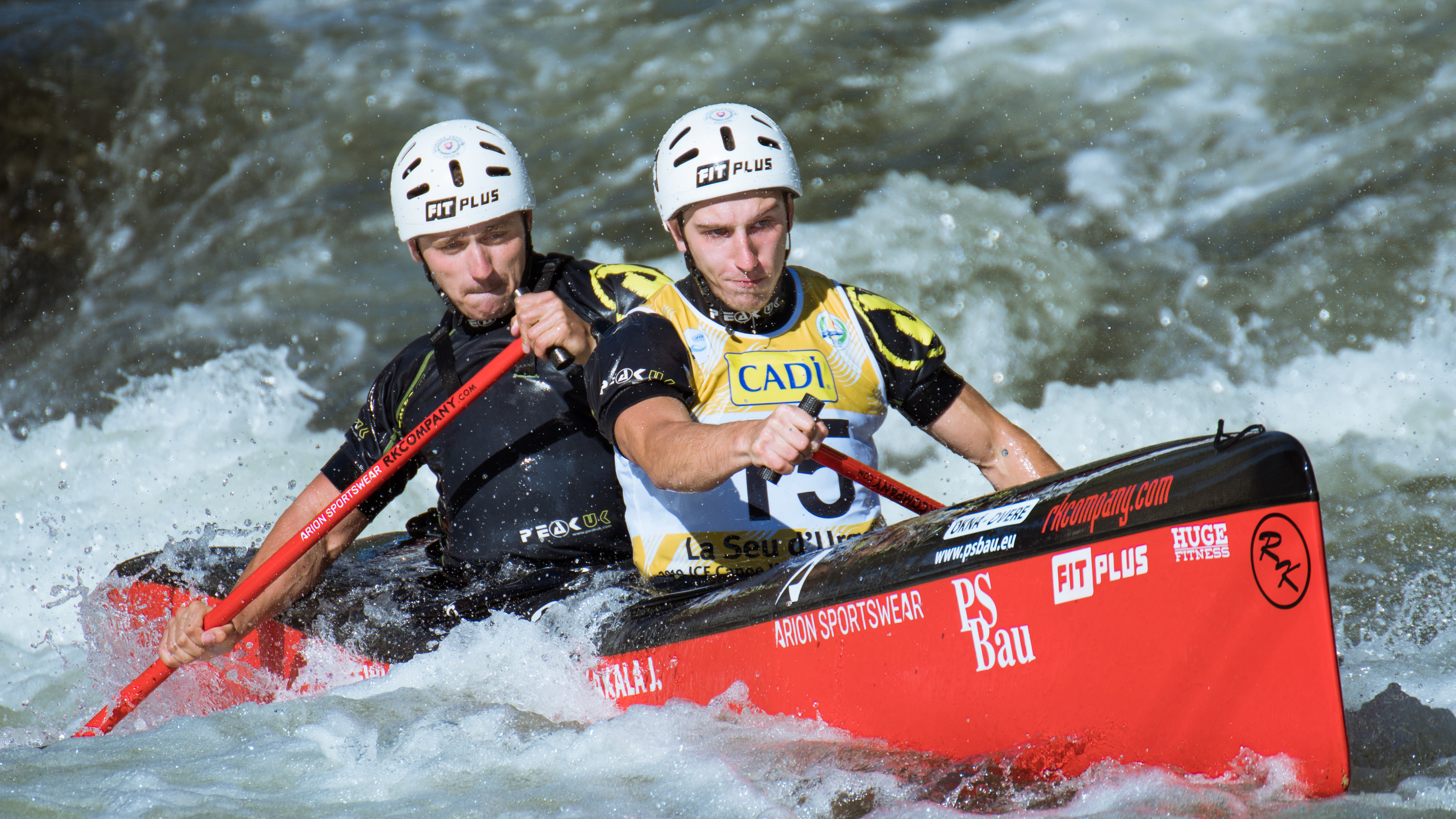
- Gewissler (left) in 2019

Personal information
- Nationality: Slovak
- Born: 1 July 1995 (age 30) Slovakia

Sport
- Sport: Wildwater canoeing, Canoe slalom
- Event: C2
Medal record
Men's canoe slalom
Representing Slovakia
U23 World Championships
| Gold medal – first place | 2017 Bratislava | C2 |
| Silver medal – second place | 2015 Foz do Iguaçu | C2 |
U23 European Championships
| Gold medal – first place | 2016 Solkan | C2 |
| Silver medal – second place | 2017 Hohenlimburg | C2 |
Junior World Championships
| Gold medal – first place | 2013 Liptovský Mikuláš | C2 |
| Gold medal – first place | 2013 Liptovský Mikuláš | C2 team |
Junior European Championships
| Gold medal – first place | 2013 Bourg-Saint-Maurice | C2 |
| Silver medal – second place | 2012 Solkan | C2 team |

Matúš Gewissler (born 1 July 1995) is a Slovak male wildwater and slalom canoeist who competes in C2 together with Juraj Skákala.

In canoe slalom he competed at the junior and under-23 level in the C2 class from 2011 to 2018, when the discipline was discontinued.

He was 6th in the C2 sprint senior final at the 2019 Wildwater Canoeing World Championships.

== Achievements ==
| Year | Competition | Venue | Rank | Event | Time |
|---|---|---|---|---|---|
| 2019 | World Championships | (Spain) La Seu d'Urgell | 6th | C2 sprint | 1:01.32 |
