= Mathieu Biazizzo =

French slalom canoeist

Personal information
- Nationality: French
- Born: 11 July 1991 (age 34) Conflans-Sainte-Honorine, France

Sport
- Country: France
- Sport: Canoe slalom
- Event: K1
- Club: Epinal Canoë-Kayak
Medal record
Men's canoe slalom
Representing France
World Championships
Gold medal – first place	2014 Deep Creek Lake	K1 team
Gold medal – first place	2021 Bratislava	K1 team
Silver medal – second place	2017 Pau	K1 team
Bronze medal – third place	2013 Prague	K1 team
Bronze medal – third place	2014 Deep Creek Lake	K1
European Championships
Silver medal – second place	2017 Tacen	K1 team
U23 World Championships
Gold medal – first place	2013 Liptovský Mikuláš	K1
U23 European Championships
Silver medal – second place	2013 Bourg-Saint-Maurice	K1 team

Mathieu Biazizzo (born 11 July 1991) is a French slalom canoeist who has competed at the international level since 2009.

He won five medals at the ICF Canoe Slalom World Championships with two golds (K1 team: 2014, 2021), a silver (K1 team: 2017) and two bronzes (K1: 2014, K1 team: 2013). He also won a silver medal in the K1 team event at the 2017 European Championships in Tacen.

Biazizzo won the overall World Cup title in the K1 class in 2016.

== World Cup individual podiums ==
Season	Date	Venue	Position	Event
2013	29 Jun 2013	Augsburg	3rd	K1
2014	16 Aug 2014	Augsburg	3rd	K1
2015	27 Jun 2015	Kraków	3rd	K1
2015	4 Jul 2015	Liptovský Mikuláš	1st	K1
2016	18 Jun 2016	Pau	2nd	K1
2018	31 Aug 2018	Tacen	3rd	K1
2021	12 June 2021	Prague	3rd	K1
