= Anna Koblencová =

Czech slalom canoeist (born 1997)

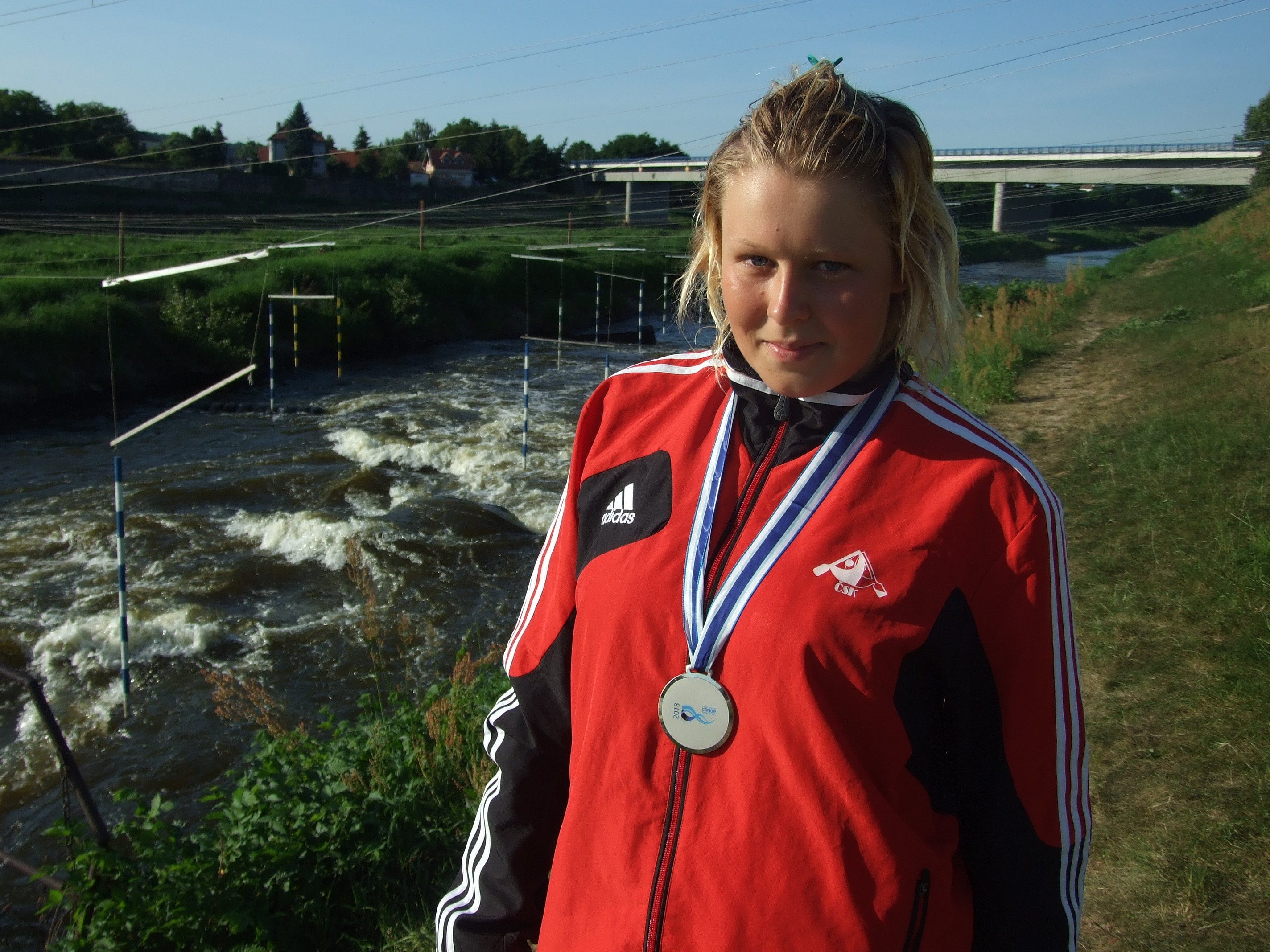

Medal record

Women's canoe slalom

Representing Czech Republic

World Championships
Silver medal – second place	2013 Prague	C1 team

U23 World Championships
Silver medal – second place	2015 Foz do Iguaçu	C1 team

U23 European Championships
Bronze medal – third place	2015 Kraków	C1 team

Junior World Championships
Silver medal – second place	2013 Liptovský Mikuláš	C1
Bronze medal – third place	2014 Penrith	C1

Junior European Championships
Bronze medal – third place	2014 Skopje	C1 team

Anna Koblencová (born 25 February 1997) is a Czech slalom canoeist who competed at the international level from 2012 to 2015.

She won a silver medal in the C1 team event at the 2013 ICF Canoe Slalom World Championships in Prague.
