= Sébastien Combot =

French canoeist

Personal information
- Born: 9 February 1987 (age 39) Landerneau, France
- Height: 169 cm (5 ft 7 in)
- Weight: 65 kg (143 lb)
Medal record
Men's canoe slalom
Representing France
World Championships
Gold medal – first place	2007 Foz do Iguaçu	K1
Gold medal – first place	2014 Deep Creek Lake	K1 team
Silver medal – second place	2007 Foz do Iguaçu	K1 team
Silver medal – second place	2014 Deep Creek Lake	K1
Silver medal – second place	2017 Pau	K1 team
European Championships
Silver medal – second place	2016 Liptovský Mikuláš	K1 team
Silver medal – second place	2017 Tacen	K1 team
U23 European Championships
Gold medal – first place	2008 Solkan	K1 team
Gold medal – first place	2009 Liptovský Mikuláš	K1 team
Gold medal – first place	2010 Markkleeberg	K1 team
Junior European Championships
Gold medal – first place	2005 Kraków	K1 team
Bronze medal – third place	2005 Kraków	K1

Sébastien Combot (born 9 February 1987 in Landerneau) is a French slalom canoeist who has competed at the international level since 2005.

He won five medals at the ICF Canoe Slalom World Championships with two golds (K1: 2007, K1 team: 2014) and three silvers (K1: 2014, K1 team: 2007, 2017). He also won two silver medals in the K1 team event at the European Championships.

Combot finished 8th in the K1 event at the 2016 Summer Olympics in Rio de Janeiro.

He began kayaking after discovering a local artificial whitewater stadium at the age of nine. His wife Laura Mangin also represented France in canoe slalom.

== World Cup individual podiums ==
Season	Date	Venue	Position	Event
2014	2 August 2014	La Seu d'Urgell	3rd	K1
2016	18 June 2016	Pau	3rd	K1
