= 2010 World Junior Canoe Slalom Championships =

The 2010 ICF World Junior Canoe Slalom Championships were the 13th edition of the ICF World Junior Canoe Slalom Championships. The event took place in Foix, France from 8 to 11 July 2010 under the auspices of the International Canoe Federation (ICF).

The women's C1 event debuted at these championships. There was no team event for this new category.

== Medal summary ==
=== Men ===
==== Canoe ====
Event	Gold	Points	Silver	Points	Bronze	Points
C1	Kirill Setkin (RUS)	114.07	Kacper Gondek (POL)	114.44	Roberto Colazingari (ITA)	115.65
C1 team	Great Britain; Adam Burgess; Ryan Westley; George Tatchell	122.17	Poland; Kacper Gondek; Wojciech Pasiut; Igor Sztuba	123.31	Czech Republic; Martin Říha; Radim Božek; Michal Pešek	123.41
C2	Filip Brzeziński/Andrzej Brzeziński (POL)	121.93	Jan Michael Müller/Marcel Prinz (GER)	125.02	Michał Wiercioch/Grzegorz Majerczak (POL)	126.42
C2 team	Germany; Jan Michael Müller/Marcel Prinz; Michel Kerstan/Ansgar Oltmanns; Tom Lorke/Max Gerth	136.69	Czech Republic; Martin Říha/Jaroslav Strnad; Jakub Hojda/Tomáš Macášek; Ludvík Medřický/Matyáš Ebel	137.08	Russia; Ilia Shaydurov/Roman Stepanov; Pavel Kovalkov/Artem Bogdanov; Pavel Slezin/Ilya Gryzlov	163.41

==== Kayak ====
Event	Gold	Points	Silver	Points	Bronze	Points
K1	Giovanni De Gennaro (ITA)	104.15	Simon Brus (SLO)	104.71	Zeno Ivaldi (ITA)	108.46
K1 team	Germany; Laurenz Laugwitz; Fabian Schweikert; Fabian Schüssler	113.88	France; Quentin Burgi; Bryan Seiler; Quentin de Fierville	114.07	Czech Republic; Jiří Prskavec; Jaroslav Strnad; Ondřej Cvikl	114.38

=== Women ===
==== Canoe ====
Event	Gold	Points	Silver	Points	Bronze	Points
C1	Jessica Fox (AUS)	137.51	Teng Qianqian (CHN)	137.85	Hailey Thompson (USA)	158.74

==== Kayak ====
Event	Gold	Points	Silver	Points	Bronze	Points
K1	Jessica Fox (AUS)	117.71	Karolína Galušková (CZE)	121.05	Eva Terčelj (SLO)	122.66
K1 team	Great Britain; Natalie Wilson; Bethan Latham; Emily Woodcock	126.91	Germany; Ricarda Funk; Caroline Trompeter; Lisa Fritsche	126.91	Czech Republic; Karolína Galušková; Anna Bustová; Pavlína Zástěrová	131.39

== Medal table ==
Rank	Nation	Gold	Silver	Bronze	Total
1	Germany (GER)	2	2	0	4
2	Australia (AUS)	2	0	0	2
2	Great Britain (GBR)	2	0	0	2
4	Poland (POL)	1	2	1	4
5	Italy (ITA)	1	0	2	3
6	Russia (RUS)	1	0	1	2
7	Czech Republic (CZE)	0	2	3	5
8	Slovenia (SLO)	0	1	1	2
9	China (CHN)	0	1	0	1
9	France (FRA)	0	1	0	1
11	United States (USA)	0	0	1	1
Totals (11 entries)		9	9	9	27
