= Juraj Skákala =

Slovak canoeist

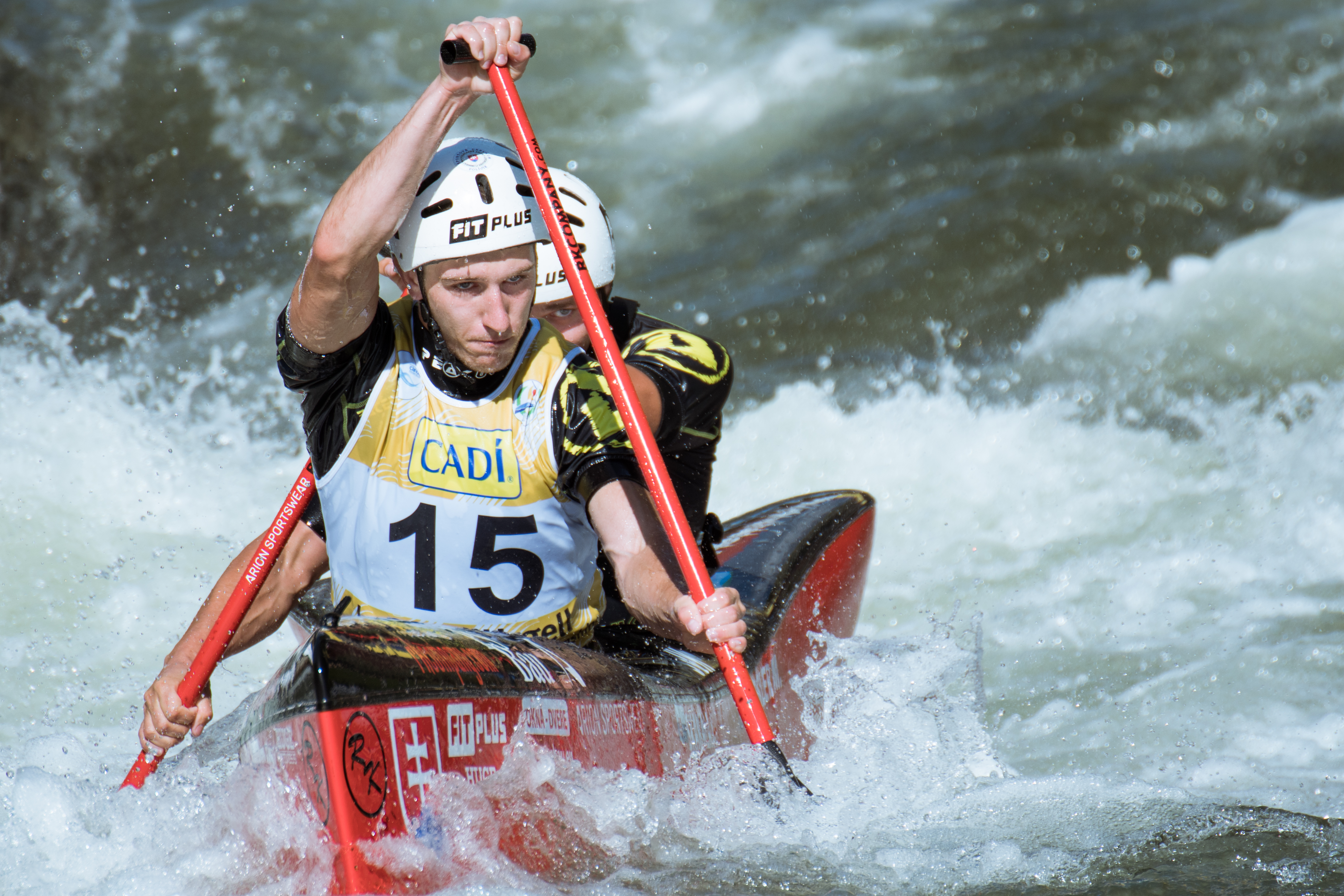
- Skákala (#15) in 2019

Personal information
- Nationality: Slovak
- Born: 4 December 1995 (age 30) Slovakia

Sport
- Sport: Wildwater canoeing, Canoe slalom
- Event: C2
Medal record
Men's canoe slalom
Representing Slovakia
U23 World Championships
Gold medal – first place	2017 Bratislava	C2
Silver medal – second place	2015 Foz do Iguaçu	C2
U23 European Championships
Gold medal – first place	2016 Solkan	C2
Silver medal – second place	2017 Hohenlimburg	C2
Junior World Championships
Gold medal – first place	2013 Liptovský Mikuláš	C2
Gold medal – first place	2013 Liptovský Mikuláš	C2 team
Junior European Championships
Gold medal – first place	2013 Bourg-Saint-Maurice	C2
Silver medal – second place	2012 Solkan	C2 team

Juraj Skákala (born 4 December 1995) is a Slovak male wildwater and slalom canoeist who competes in C2 together with Matúš Gewissler.

In canoe slalom he competed at the junior and under-23 level in the C2 class from 2011 to 2018, when the discipline was discontinued.

He was 6th in the C2 sprint senior final at the 2019 Wildwater Canoeing World Championships.

== Achievements ==
Year	Competition	Venue	Rank	Event	Time
2019	World Championships	(Spain) La Seu d'Urgell	6th	C2 sprint	1:01.32
