= 2014 World Junior and U23 Canoe Slalom Championships =

The 2014 ICF World Junior and U23 Canoe Slalom Championships took place in Penrith, Australia from 23 to 27 April 2014 under the auspices of the International Canoe Federation (ICF) at the Penrith Whitewater Stadium. It was the 16th edition of the competition for Juniors (U18) and the 3rd edition for the Under 23 category.

No medals were awarded for the men's U23 C2 team event and the women's junior and U23 C1 team events due to low number of participating nations. The men's junior C2 team event did not take place.

== Medal summary ==
=== Men ===
==== Canoe ====
===== Junior =====
Event	Gold	Points	Silver	Points	Bronze	Points
C1	Florian Breuer (GER)	104.31	Liam Jegou (IRL)	107.61	Roman Malyshev (RUS)	110.54
C1 team	Slovakia; Marko Gurečka; Marko Mirgorodský; Martin Mračna	121.79	Czech Republic; Václav Chaloupka; Tomáš Heger; Roman Matula	124.75	Spain; Luis Fernández; Jesus Cid; Jordi Tebé	136.54
C2	Michael Matějka/Jan Větrovský (CZE)	122.90	Daniel Munro/Luke Robinson (NZL)	130.56	Adam Kozub/Jakub Brzeziński (POL)	135.06

===== U23 =====
Event	Gold	Points	Silver	Points	Bronze	Points
C1	Roberto Colazingari (ITA)	98.86	Luka Božič (SLO)	99.02	Thomas Quinn (GBR)	104.18
C1 team	Russia; Ruslan Sayfiev; Kirill Setkin; Roman Malyshev	116.06	Slovakia; Patrik Gajarský; Jerguš Baďura; Tomáš Džurný	116.99	France; Cédric Joly; Kilian Foulon; Thibaut Perroteau	117.70
C2	Jonáš Kašpar/Marek Šindler (CZE)	107.99	Filip Brzeziński/Andrzej Brzeziński (POL)	114.96	Aleksei Popov/Vadim Voinalovich (RUS)	119.90
C2 team (non-medal event)	Poland; Filip Brzeziński/Andrzej Brzeziński; Michał Wiercioch/Grzegorz Majerczak; Wojciech Pasiut/Kacper Gondek	128.71	Czech Republic; Jonáš Kašpar/Marek Šindler; Michael Matějka/Jan Větrovský; Jan Mrázek/Tomáš Rousek	139.94	Brazil; Charles Corrêa/Anderson Oliveira; Wallan De Carvalho/Welton De Carvalho; Maicon de Borba/Carlos Moraes	218.16

==== Kayak ====
===== Junior =====
Event	Gold	Points	Silver	Points	Bronze	Points
K1	Mario Leitner (AUT)	98.48	Vid Kuder Marušič (SLO)	99.47	Jakub Grigar (SVK)	99.76
K1 team	Czech Republic; Pavel Šupolík; Petr Šodek; Tomáš Rousek	115.25	Spain; David Llorente; Unai Nabaskues; Jordi Cadena	115.92	Great Britain; Zachary Allin; Austin Barker; Christopher Bowers	117.94

===== U23 =====
Event	Gold	Points	Silver	Points	Bronze	Points
K1	Michal Smolen (USA)	93.10	Giovanni De Gennaro (ITA)	94.29	Jiří Prskavec (CZE)	94.67
K1 team	Poland; Rafał Polaczyk; Michał Pasiut; Maciej Okręglak	105.07	Great Britain; Thomas Brady; Joe Clarke; Steffan Walker	106.32	Slovakia; Martin Halčin; Andrej Málek; Miroslav Urban	106.40

=== Women ===
==== Canoe ====
===== Junior =====
Event	Gold	Points	Silver	Points	Bronze	Points
C1	Lucie Prioux (FRA)	127.24	Martina Satková (CZE)	128.42	Anna Koblencová (CZE)	131.79
C1 team (non-medal event)	Czech Republic; Martina Satková; Anna Koblencová; Jana Matulková	162.44	Australia; Noemie Fox; Kate Eckhardt; Alexandra Broome	225.62	France; Lucie Prioux; Margaux Henry; Camille Prigent	293.32

===== U23 =====
Event	Gold	Points	Silver	Points	Bronze	Points
C1	Jessica Fox (AUS)	111.79	Monika Jančová (CZE)	130.60	Núria Vilarrubla (ESP)	132.95
C1 team (non-medal event)	Czech Republic; Monika Jančová; Martina Satková; Anna Koblencová	147.28	Great Britain; Mallory Franklin; Jasmine Royle; Eilidh Gibson	151.63	New Zealand; Jane Nicholas; Haylee Dangen; Kelly Travers	187.99

==== Kayak ====
===== Junior =====
Event	Gold	Points	Silver	Points	Bronze	Points
K1	Ana Sátila (BRA)	114.48	Kate Eckhardt (AUS)	121.77	Paulína Matulániová (SVK)	122.19
K1 team	Czech Republic; Sabina Foltysová; Amálie Hilgertová; Tereza Fišerová	139.54	Spain; Miren Lazkano; Klara Olazabal; Irene Egües	142.91	France; Camille Prigent; Margaux Henry; Claire Gaigeot	144.71

===== U23 =====
Event	Gold	Points	Silver	Points	Bronze	Points
K1	Jessica Fox (AUS)	105.97	Li Lu (CHN)	109.15	Bethan Latham (GBR)	111.92
K1 team	Great Britain; Kimberley Woods; Bethan Latham; Mallory Franklin	124.48	Czech Republic; Karolína Galušková; Pavlína Zástěrová; Barbora Valíková	129.67	Australia; Jessica Fox; Alison Borrows; Georgia Rankin	132.21

== Medal table ==
Rank	Nation	Gold	Silver	Bronze	Total
1	Czech Republic (CZE)	4	4	2	10
2	Australia (AUS)	2	1	1	4
3	Great Britain (GBR)	1	1	3	5
3	Slovakia (SVK)	1	1	3	5
5	Poland (POL)	1	1	1	3
6	Italy (ITA)	1	1	0	2
7	France (FRA)	1	0	2	3
7	Russia (RUS)	1	0	2	3
9	Austria (AUT)	1	0	0	1
9	Brazil (BRA)	1	0	0	1
9	Germany (GER)	1	0	0	1
9	United States (USA)	1	0	0	1
13	Spain (ESP)	0	2	2	4
14	Slovenia (SLO)	0	2	0	2
15	China (CHN)	0	1	0	1
15	Ireland (IRL)	0	1	0	1
15	New Zealand (NZL)	0	1	0	1
Totals (17 entries)		16	16	16	48
