= Lisa Fritsche =

German slalom canoeist

Personal information
- Nationality: German
- Born: 28 April 1993 (age 33)
- Height: 1.69 m (5 ft 7 in)

Sport
- Country: Germany
- Sport: Canoe slalom
- Event: K1
- Club: Bollberger SV Halle
Medal record
Women's canoe slalom
Representing Germany
World Championships
Gold medal – first place	2017 Pau	K1 team
Silver medal – second place	2018 Rio de Janeiro	K1 team
European Championships
Gold medal – first place	2018 Prague	K1 team
Silver medal – second place	2016 Liptovský Mikuláš	K1 team
U23 World Championships
Gold medal – first place	2016 Kraków	K1 team
Silver medal – second place	2013 Liptovský Mikuláš	K1 team
Bronze medal – third place	2013 Liptovský Mikuláš	K1
Bronze medal – third place	2016 Kraków	K1
U23 European Championships
Gold medal – first place	2012 Solkan	K1 team
Gold medal – first place	2016 Solkan	K1 team
Silver medal – second place	2014 Skopje	K1 team
Bronze medal – third place	2016 Solkan	K1
Junior World Championships
Silver medal – second place	2010 Foix	K1 team
Junior European Championships
Gold medal – first place	2010 Markkleeberg	K1 team
Gold medal – first place	2011 Banja Luka	K1
Gold medal – first place	2011 Banja Luka	K1 team

Lisa Fritsche (born 28 April 1993) is a German slalom canoeist who has competed at the international level since 2010.

She won two medals in the K1 team event at the ICF Canoe Slalom World Championships with a gold in 2017 and a silver in 2018. She also won a gold and a silver medal in the same event at the European Championships.
