= Núria Vilarrubla =

Spanish slalom canoeist (born 1992)

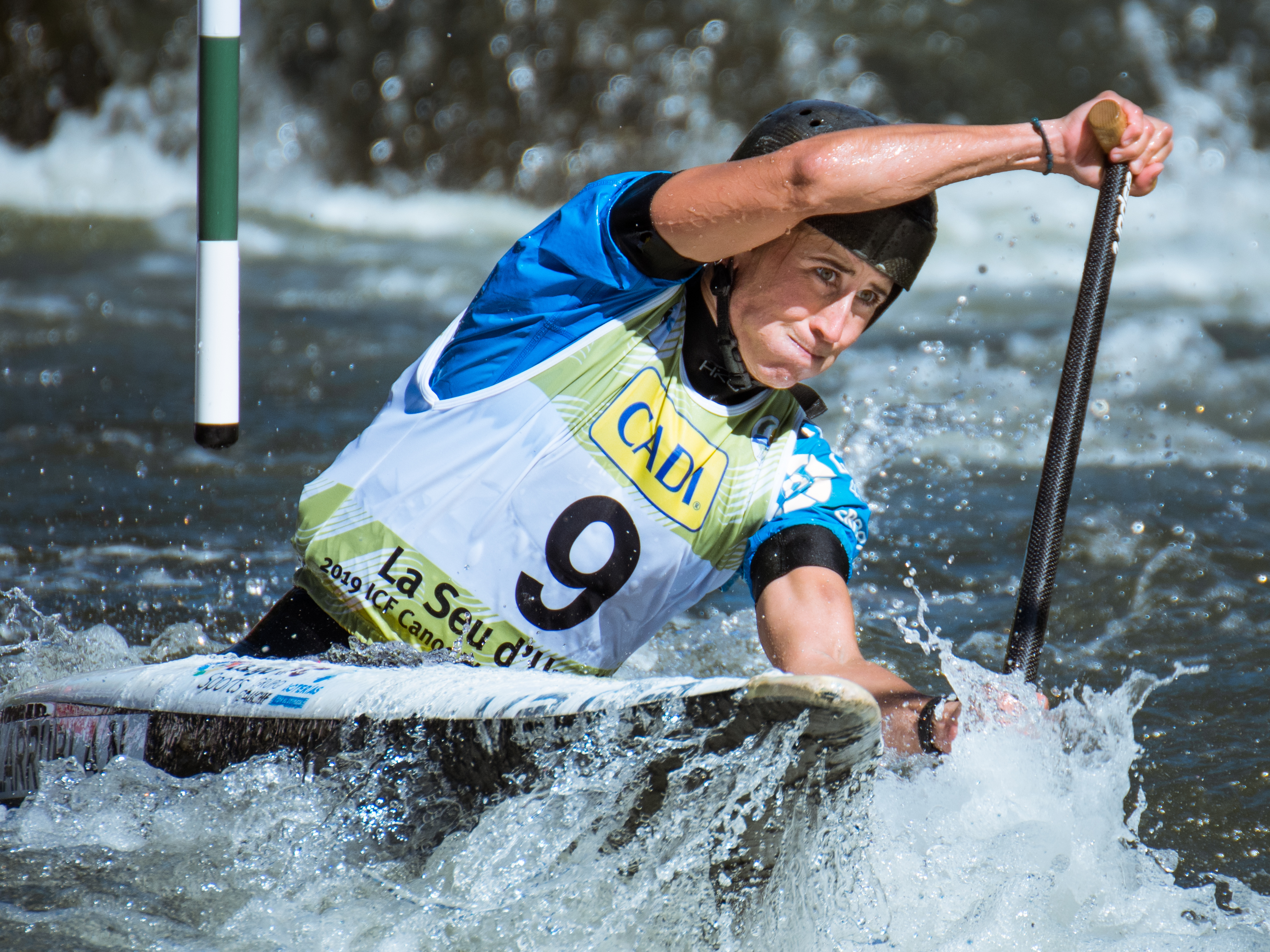
- Vilarrubla at the 2019 Canoe Slalom World Championships.

Personal information
- Full name: Núria Vilarrubla García
- Nationality: Spanish
- Born: 9 March 1992 (age 34) La Seu d'Urgell, Spain
- Height: 1.65 m (5 ft 5 in)
- Weight: 55 kg (121 lb)

Sport
- Country: Spain
- Sport: Canoe slalom
- Event: C1, K1
- Club: Cadi Canoe Kayak La Seu d'Urgell
Medal record
Representing Spain
World Championships
Silver medal – second place	2019 La Seu d'Urgell	C1 team
Silver medal – second place	2021 Bratislava	C1 team
Bronze medal – third place	2015 London	C1
European Championships
Gold medal – first place	2015 Markkleeberg	C1 team
Gold medal – first place	2016 Liptovský Mikuláš	C1
Silver medal – second place	2019 Pau	C1
Bronze medal – third place	2013 Kraków	C1
Bronze medal – third place	2015 Markkleeberg	C1
Bronze medal – third place	2018 Prague	C1 team
U23 World Championships
Gold medal – first place	2015 Foz do Iguaçu	C1
Gold medal – first place	2015 Foz do Iguaçu	C1 team
Silver medal – second place	2013 Liptovský Mikuláš	C1 team
Bronze medal – third place	2014 Penrith	C1
U23 European Championships
Gold medal – first place	2012 Solkan	C1 team
Gold medal – first place	2015 Kraków	K1
Silver medal – second place	2011 Banja Luka	C1
Silver medal – second place	2012 Solkan	K1 team
Silver medal – second place	2013 Bourg-Saint-Maurice	C1
Silver medal – second place	2014 Skopje	C1
Silver medal – second place	2015 Kraków	C1
Silver medal – second place	2015 Kraków	C1 team

Núria Vilarrubla García (born 9 March 1992) is a Spanish slalom canoeist who has competed at the international level since 2009.

She won three medals at the ICF Canoe Slalom World Championships with two silvers (C1 team: 2019, 2021) and a bronze (C1: 2015). She also won six medals (2 golds, 1 silver and 3 bronzes) at the European Championships.

Vilarrubla competed at the 2020 Summer Olympics in Tokyo, finishing 8th in the C1 event.

== World Cup individual podiums ==
	1st place, gold medalist(s)	2nd place, silver medalist(s)	3rd place, bronze medalist(s)	Total
C1	4	5	3	12

Season	Date	Venue	Position	Event
2012	23 June 2012	La Seu d'Urgell	3rd	C1
2014	2 August 2014	La Seu d'Urgell	2nd	C1
2015	15 August 2015	Pau	1st	C1
2016	11 June 2016	La Seu d'Urgell	1st	C1
2016	18 June 2016	Pau	3rd	C1
2017	1 July 2017	Markkleeberg	2nd	C1
2017	9 September 2017	La Seu d'Urgell	1st	C1
2018	1 July 2018	Kraków	2nd	C1
2019	1 September 2019	Markkleeberg	1st	C1
2021	5 September 2021	La Seu d'Urgell	3rd	C1
2024	1 June 2024	Augsburg	2nd	C1
2026	13 June 2026	Augsburg	2nd	C1
