= 2014 ICF Canoe Slalom World Championships =

36th edition held between the 17th and 21st of September

The 2014 ICF Canoe Slalom World Championships were the 36th edition of the ICF Canoe Slalom World Championships. The event took place from September 17 to 21, 2014 at Deep Creek Lake, Maryland, United States (Western Maryland near Pittsburgh) under the auspices of International Canoe Federation (ICF), at the Adventure Sports Center International facility.

The Deep Creek bid was selected by the ICF Board of Directors on April 15, 2011 in Paris. The other bids were by Vienna and Kraków.

In total there were 10 events of which 9 were medal events. The women's C1 team event did not count as a medal event due to insufficient number of participating federations. According to ICF rules, there must be at least 6 federations participating at a non-olympic event to count as a world championship event.

== Schedule ==
This was the schedule of events. All times listed are EDT (UTC-4).

Date	Starting Time	Events
18 September	09:00	C1 Men, C1 Women, K1 Men heats
19 September	09:00	K1 Women, C2 Men heats
19 September	16:15	K1 Men semifinals
20 September	09:00	C1 Men, C1 Women semifinals
20 September	12:00	C1 Men, C1 Women, K1 Men, C1 Men Teams, C1 Women Teams, K1 Men Teams
21 September	09:00	K1 Women, C2 Men semifinals
21 September	12:00	Finals - K1 Women, C2 Men, K1 Women Teams, C2 Men Teams

1st gate set, preliminary heats, September 18, 19.

2nd gate set, semi- & finals, September 19–21.

== Medal summary ==
=== Men's ===
==== Canoe ====
Event	Gold	Points	Silver	Points	Bronze	Points
C1	Fabien Lefèvre (USA)	106.82	Benjamin Savšek (SLO)	108.62	Franz Anton (GER)	110.30
C1 team	Slovakia; Michal Martikán; Alexander Slafkovský; Matej Beňuš	125.10	Czech Republic; Michal Jáně; Vítězslav Gebas; Jan Mašek	126.09	Slovenia; Benjamin Savšek; Luka Božič; Anže Berčič	127.84
C2	Slovenia; Luka Božič; Sašo Taljat	118.43	France; Pierre Picco; Hugo Biso	119.60	Slovakia; Ladislav Škantár; Peter Škantár	122.78
C2 team	France; Pierre Labarelle & Nicolas Peschier; Gauthier Klauss & Matthieu Péché; Pierre Picco & Hugo Biso	140.96	Slovakia; Pavol Hochschorner & Peter Hochschorner; Ladislav Škantár & Peter Škantár; Tomáš Kučera & Ján Bátik	143.13	Czech Republic; Ondřej Karlovský & Jakub Jáně; Jonáš Kašpar & Marek Šindler; Tomáš Koplík & Jakub Vrzáň	152.51

==== Kayak ====
Event	Gold	Points	Silver	Points	Bronze	Points
K1	Boris Neveu (FRA)	101.61	Sébastien Combot (FRA)	102.34	Mathieu Biazizzo (FRA)	102.92
K1 team	France; Mathieu Biazizzo; Sébastien Combot; Boris Neveu	112.79	Czech Republic; Jiří Prskavec; Vavřinec Hradilek; Vít Přindiš	115.11	Great Britain; Richard Hounslow; Joe Clarke; Thomas Brady	123.24

=== Women's ===
==== Canoe ====
Event	Gold	Points	Silver	Points	Bronze	Points
C1	Jessica Fox (AUS)	132.85	Mallory Franklin (GBR)	138.78	Oriane Rebours (FRA)	139.62
C1 team (non-medal event)	Czech Republic; Kateřina Hošková; Monika Jančová; Martina Satková	170.22	Great Britain; Mallory Franklin; Jasmine Royle; Eilidh Gibson	181.83	France; Caroline Loir; Oriane Rebours; Lucie Baudu	218.69

==== Kayak ====
Event	Gold	Points	Silver	Points	Bronze	Points
K1	Jessica Fox (AUS)	114.01	Fiona Pennie (GBR)	114.97	Melanie Pfeifer (GER)	120.01
K1 team	France; Carole Bouzidi; Nouria Newman; Émilie Fer	132.47	Austria; Corinna Kuhnle; Lisa Leitner; Viktoria Wolffhardt	139.46	Slovakia; Elena Kaliská; Jana Dukátová; Kristína Nevařilová	140.31

=== Medal table ===
Rank	Nation	Gold	Silver	Bronze	Total
1	France (FRA)	4	2	2	8
2	Australia (AUS)	2	0	0	2
3	Slovakia (SVK)	1	1	2	4
4	Slovenia (SLO)	1	1	1	3
5	United States (USA)	1	0	0	1
6	Czech Republic (CZE)	0	2	1	3
6	Great Britain (GBR)	0	2	1	3
8	Austria (AUT)	0	1	0	1
9	Germany (GER)	0	0	2	2
Totals (9 entries)		9	9	9	27
