= 2017 European Canoe Slalom Championships =

The 2017 European Canoe Slalom Championships took place in Tacen, Slovenia under the auspices of the European Canoe Association (ECA). It was the 18th edition of the competition and Tacen hosted the event for the second time after previously hosting it in 2005. The events took place at the Tacen Whitewater Course from 31 May to 4 June 2017.

== Medal summary ==
=== Men's results ===
==== Canoe ====
Event	Gold	Points	Silver	Points	Bronze	Points
C1	Alexander Slafkovský (SVK)	88.92	Thomas Koechlin (SUI)	91.63	Michal Martikán (SVK)	93.82
C1 team	Germany; Sideris Tasiadis; Nico Bettge; Franz Anton	108.94	Slovenia; Benjamin Savšek; Luka Božič; Anže Berčič	111.13	Italy; Raffaello Ivaldi; Roberto Colazingari; Stefano Cipressi	112.98
C2	France; Pierre Picco; Hugo Biso	98.22	Poland; Andrzej Brzeziński; Filip Brzeziński	99.09	Czech Republic; Jonáš Kašpar; Marek Šindler	99.20
C2 team	France; Gauthier Klauss & Matthieu Péché; Pierre Picco & Hugo Biso; Nicolas Scianimanico & Hugo Cailhol	120.44	Poland; Marcin Pochwała & Piotr Szczepański; Andrzej Brzeziński & Filip Brzeziński; Michał Wiercioch & Grzegorz Majerczak	128.21	Czech Republic; Ondřej Karlovský & Jakub Jáně; Jonáš Kašpar & Marek Šindler; Tomáš Koplík & Jakub Vrzáň	132.23

==== Kayak ====
Event	Gold	Points	Silver	Points	Bronze	Points
K1	Mateusz Polaczyk (POL)	83.06	Dariusz Popiela (POL)	83.63	Jiří Prskavec (CZE)	84.03
K1 team	Czech Republic; Jiří Prskavec; Ondřej Tunka; Vít Přindiš	101.28	France; Mathieu Biazizzo; Sébastien Combot; Boris Neveu	101.73	Poland; Mateusz Polaczyk; Maciej Okręglak; Dariusz Popiela	104.01

=== Women's results ===
==== Canoe ====
Event	Gold	Points	Silver	Points	Bronze	Points
C1	Kimberley Woods (GBR)	110.31	Tereza Fišerová (CZE)	112.90	Nadine Weratschnig (AUT)	116.19
C1 team	Great Britain; Kimberley Woods; Mallory Franklin; Eilidh Gibson	153.24	Germany; Andrea Herzog; Lena Stöcklin; Birgit Ohmayer	157.32	Czech Republic; Tereza Fišerová; Monika Jančová; Eva Říhová	158.48

==== Kayak ====
Event	Gold	Points	Silver	Points	Bronze	Points
K1	Corinna Kuhnle (AUT)	95.37	Stefanie Horn (ITA)	96.38	Marie-Zélia Lafont (FRA)	96.94
K1 team	Slovenia; Urša Kragelj; Eva Terčelj; Ajda Novak	122.60	Spain; Irati Goikoetxea; Maialen Chourraut; Marta Martínez	125.68	France; Lucie Baudu; Marie-Zélia Lafont; Camille Prigent	129.39

== Medal table ==
Rank	Nation	Gold	Silver	Bronze	Total
1	France (FRA)	2	1	2	5
2	Great Britain (GBR)	2	0	0	2
3	Poland (POL)	1	3	1	5
4	Czech Republic (CZE)	1	1	4	6
5	Germany (GER)	1	1	0	2
5	Slovenia (SLO)	1	1	0	2
7	Austria (AUT)	1	0	1	2
7	Slovakia (SVK)	1	0	1	2
9	Italy (ITA)	0	1	1	2
10	Spain (ESP)	0	1	0	1
10	Switzerland (SUI)	0	1	0	1
Totals (11 entries)		10	10	10	30
