= Thomas Brady (canoeist) =

British slalom canoeist (born 1991)

Personal information
- Citizenship: British
- Born: Thomas Brady; July 22, 1991 (age 34) Basingstoke, Hampshire, England
- Years active: 2007–present
- Height: 1.82 m (6 ft 0 in)

Sport
- Country: Great Britain
Medal record
Men's canoe slalom
Representing Great Britain
World Championships
Bronze medal – third place	2014 Deep Creek Lake	K1 team
European Championships
Silver medal – second place	2014 Vienna	K1 team
U23 World Championships
Silver medal – second place	2013 Liptovský Mikuláš	K1 team
Silver medal – second place	2014 Penrith	K1 team
Junior European Championships
Silver medal – second place	2008 Solkan	K1
Silver medal – second place	2009 Liptovský Mikuláš	K1 team
Bronze medal – third place	2008 Solkan	K1 team
|}

Thomas Brady (born 22 July 1991 in Basingstoke) is a British slalom canoeist who competed at the international level from 2007 to 2014.

He won a bronze medal in the K1 team event at the 2014 ICF Canoe Slalom World Championships at Deep Creek Lake. He also won a silver medal at the same event at the 2014 European Canoe Slalom Championships in Vienna.
