= Nouria Newman =

French slalom canoeist (born 1991)

Medal record

Women's canoe slalom

Representing France

World Championships
Gold medal – first place	2014 Deep Creek Lake	K1 team
Silver medal – second place	2013 Prague	K1

European Championships
Bronze medal – third place	2014 Vienna	K1 team

U23 World Championships
Bronze medal – third place	2012 Wausau	K1
Bronze medal – third place	2012 Wausau	K1 team

U23 European Championships
Silver medal – second place	2013 Bourg St. Maurice	K1
Bronze medal – third place	2013 Bourg St. Maurice	K1 team

Junior World Championships
Silver medal – second place	2008 Roudnice nad Labem	K1 team

Junior European Championships
Gold medal – first place	2009 Liptovský Mikuláš	K1 team
Silver medal – second place	2009 Liptovský Mikuláš	K1

Nouria Newman (born 9 September 1991 in Chambéry is a French slalom canoeist who competed at the international level from 2007 to 2015.

She won two medals at the ICF Canoe Slalom World Championships with a gold in 2014 (K1 team) and a silver in 2013 (K1). She also won a bronze medal in the K1 team event at the 2014 European Championships in Vienna.

She made a solo kayaking expedition Ladakh 2018 sponsored by Red Bull. She paddled down the Tsarap - Zanskar - Indus River in 7 days, covering 375 km; and was, in her own words, after getting hung up on a rock at one point, lucky to be alive. She made a 13 minute video of this journey which is on YouTube. She was the first female to paddle a 100 foot waterfall (Pucono Falls, Ecuador)

Nouria's life and accomplishments were the focus of the 2022 Red Bull film, Wild Waters.
