= Kristína Zárubová =

Slovak slalom canoeist (born 1995)

Personal information
- Nationality: Slovak
- Born: 15 December 1995 (age 30)
- Years active: 2010–2015

Sport
- Country: Slovakia
- Sport: Canoe slalom
- Event: K1
Medal record
Women's canoe slalom
Representing Slovakia
European Championships
Gold medal – first place	2015 Markkleeberg	K1 team

Kristína Zárubová (born 15 December 1995) is a former Slovak slalom canoeist who competed at the international level from 2010 to 2015, specializing in the K1 discipline.

Zárubová won a gold medal in the K1 team event at the 2015 European Championships in Markkleeberg. She also finished 36th in the individual K1 event at the same championships.
