= Aleksandra Perova =

Russian canoeist

Aleksandra Andreyevna Perova (Russian: Александра Андреевна Перова) (born 16 May 1982 in Lyubertsy) is a Russian slalom canoeist who competed at the international level from 2002 to 2017. She participated in the K1 event at the 2008 Summer Olympics in Beijing where she finished in 18th place after being eliminated in the heats.

Her younger sister Ekaterina is also a slalom canoeist.
