= Vítězslav Gebas =

Czech slalom canoeist (born 1984)

Medal record

Men's canoe slalom

Representing Czech Republic

World Championships
Silver medal – second place	2014 Deep Creek Lake	C1 team
Bronze medal – third place	2011 Bratislava	C1 team

European Championships
Silver medal – second place	2014 Vienna	C1 team
Bronze medal – third place	2011 La Seu d'Urgell	C1 team
Bronze medal – third place	2018 Prague	C1 team

Vítězslav Gebas (Czech pronunciation: [ˈviːcɛslav ˈɡɛbas]; born 24 March 1984 in Hradec Králové, Czechoslovakia) is a Czech slalom canoeist who has competed since the early 2000s.

He won two medals in the C1 team event at the ICF Canoe Slalom World Championships with a silver in 2014 and a bronze in 2011. He also won one silver and two bronzes in the C1 team event at the European Championships.

Gebas finished fourth in the C1 event at the 2016 Summer Olympics in Rio de Janeiro.

== World Cup individual podiums ==
Season	Date	Venue	Position	Event
2010	20 Feb 2010	Penrith	2nd	C1^{1}
2012	25 Aug 2012	Prague	3rd	C1
2012	1 Sep 2012	Bratislava	3rd	C1
2016	11 Jun 2016	La Seu d'Urgell	3rd	C1

^{1} Oceania Canoe Slalom Open counting for World Cup points
