= Oriane Rebours =

French slalom canoeist (born 1988)

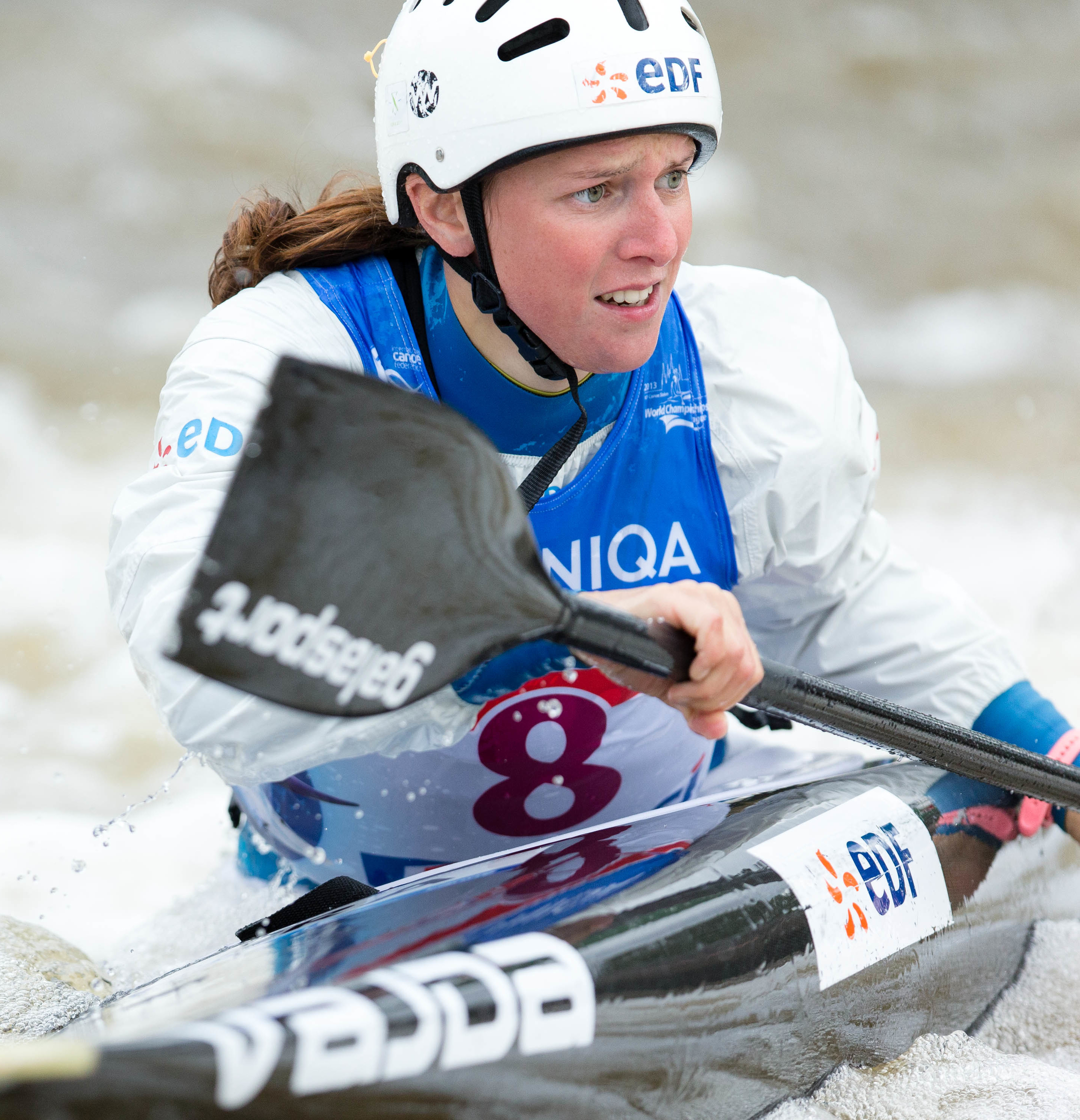
- Rebours at Slalom World Championships 2013

Medal record

Women's canoe slalom

Representing France

World Championships
Bronze medal – third place	2014 Deep Creek Lake	C1

U23 European Championships
Gold medal – first place	2011 Banja Luka	C1

Oriane Rebours (born 1 November 1988) is a French slalom canoeist who competed at the international level from 2011 to 2014.

She won a bronze medal in the C1 event at the 2014 ICF Canoe Slalom World Championships at Deep Creek Lake.

== World Cup individual podiums ==
Season	Date	Venue	Position	Event
2012	1 Sep 2012	Bratislava	3rd	C1
