= Ekaterina Perova =

Russian canoeist

Personal information
- Nationality: Russian
- Born: 24 October 1985 (age 40)
- Height: 1.72 m (5 ft 8 in)
- Weight: 55 kg (121 lb)

Sport
- Country: Russia
- Sport: Canoe slalom
- Event: K1
- Club: Khlebnikovo Centre of Sports Preparation
Medal record
Women's canoe slalom
Representing Russia
World Championships
Bronze medal – third place	2019 La Seu d'Urgell	K1 team
U23 European Championships
Silver medal – second place	2008 Solkan	K1 team

Ekaterina Perova (born 24 October 1985) is a Russian slalom canoeist who has competed at the international level since 2003.

She won a bronze medal in the K1 team event at the 2019 ICF Canoe Slalom World Championships in La Seu d'Urgell.

Her older sister Aleksandra is also a slalom canoeist.
