= Karol Rozmuš =

Slovak slalom canoeist (born 1987)

Personal information
- Nationality: Slovak
- Born: 18 April 1987 (age 39)
- Years active: 2004 - 2014

Sport
- Country: Slovakia
- Sport: Canoe slalom
- Event: C1, C2
- Club: ŠCP
Medal record
Men's canoe slalom
Representing Slovakia
European Championships
Bronze medal – third place	2014 Vienna	C1 team
U23 European Championships
Silver medal – second place	2009 Liptovský Mikuláš	C1
Bronze medal – third place	2010 Markkleeberg	C1 team

Karol Rozmuš (born 18 April 1987) is a former Slovak slalom canoeist who competed at the international level from 2004 to 2014, specializing primarily in the C1 discipline.

He won a bronze medal in the C1 team event at the 2014 European Canoe Slalom Championships in Vienna. He also finished 22nd in the individual C1 event at the same championships. He finished 10th in the C1 overall World Cup standings in 2012.

He also won a silver medal in the C1 event at the 2009 European U23 Championships in Liptovský Mikuláš, finishing runner-up to his teammate Matej Beňuš.
