= Maciej Okręglak =

Polish slalom canoeist

Personal information
- Born: 5 July 1993 (age 33) Nowy Sącz, Poland
- Height: 176 cm (5 ft 9 in)
- Weight: 73 kg (161 lb)
Medal record
Men's canoe slalom
Representing Poland
European Championships
Bronze medal – third place	2017 Tacen	K1 team
U23 World Championships
Gold medal – first place	2014 Penrith	K1 team
Silver medal – second place	2015 Foz do Iguaçu	K1 team
U23 European Championships
Gold medal – first place	2014 Skopje	K1 team
Bronze medal – third place	2013 Bourg St. Maurice	K1 team
Junior European Championships
Silver medal – second place	2011 Banja Luka	K1 team

Maciej Okręglak (born 5 July 1993, in Nowy Sącz) is a Polish slalom canoeist who has competed at the international level since 2009.

He won a bronze medal in K1 team event at the 2017 European Championships in Tacen. He finished in 18th place in the K1 event at the 2016 Summer Olympics in Rio de Janeiro.
