= Alison Borrows =

Australian slalom canoeist

Medal record

Women's canoe slalom

Representing Australia

World Championships
Gold medal – first place	2013 Prague	C1 team
Gold medal – first place	2015 London	C1 team

U23 World Championships
Gold medal – first place	2012 Wausau	C1 team
Silver medal – second place	2015 Foz do Iguaçu	K1 team
Bronze medal – third place	2013 Liptovský Mikuláš	C1 team
Bronze medal – third place	2014 Penrith	K1 team

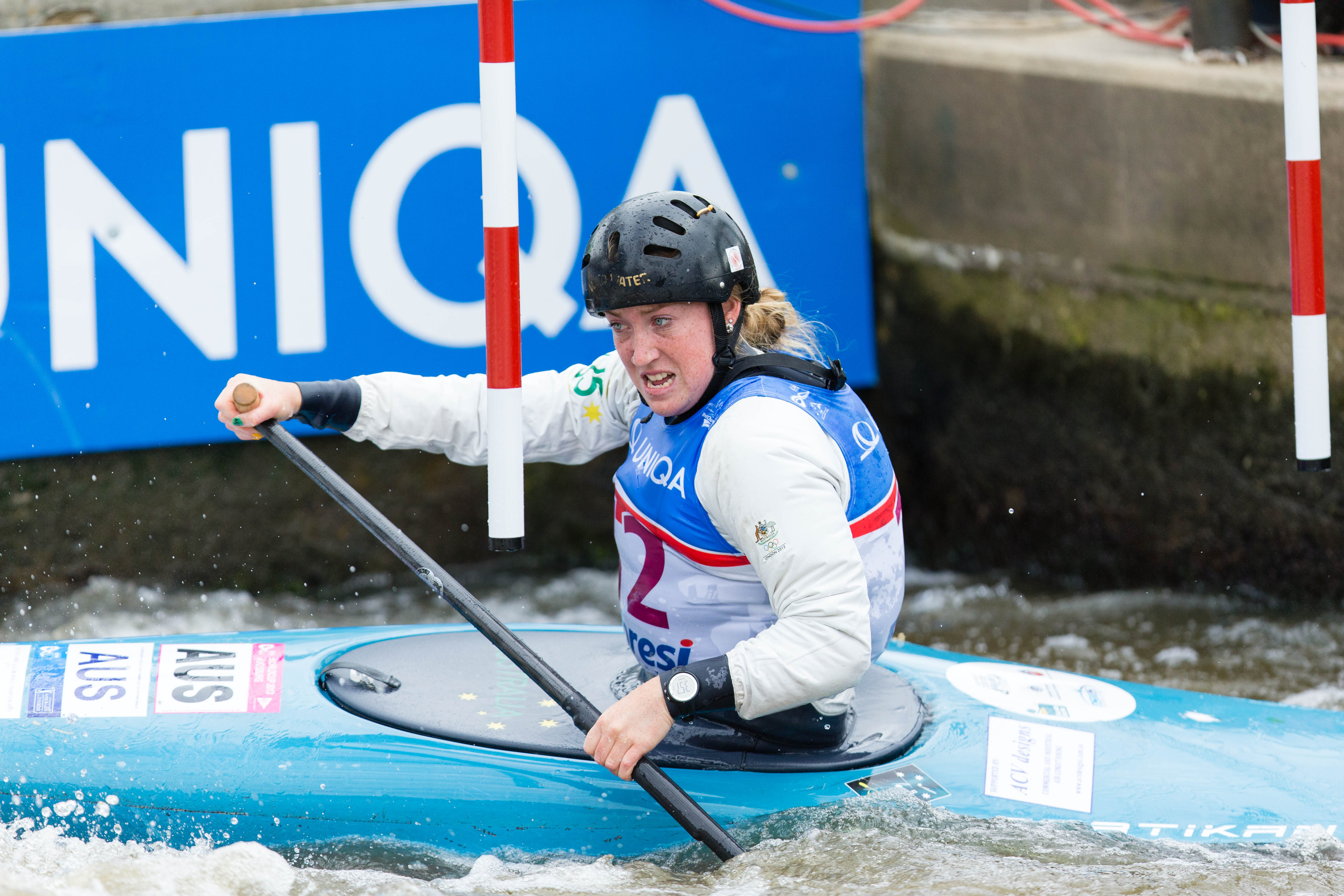

Alison Borrows (born 16 September 1992) is an Australian slalom canoeist who competed at the international level from 2008 to 2016.

She won two gold medals in the C1 team event at the ICF Canoe Slalom World Championships, earning them in 2013 and 2015.

Her older brother Ian is also a slalom canoeist.
