= Kacper Gondek =

Polish slalom canoeist (1993–2018)

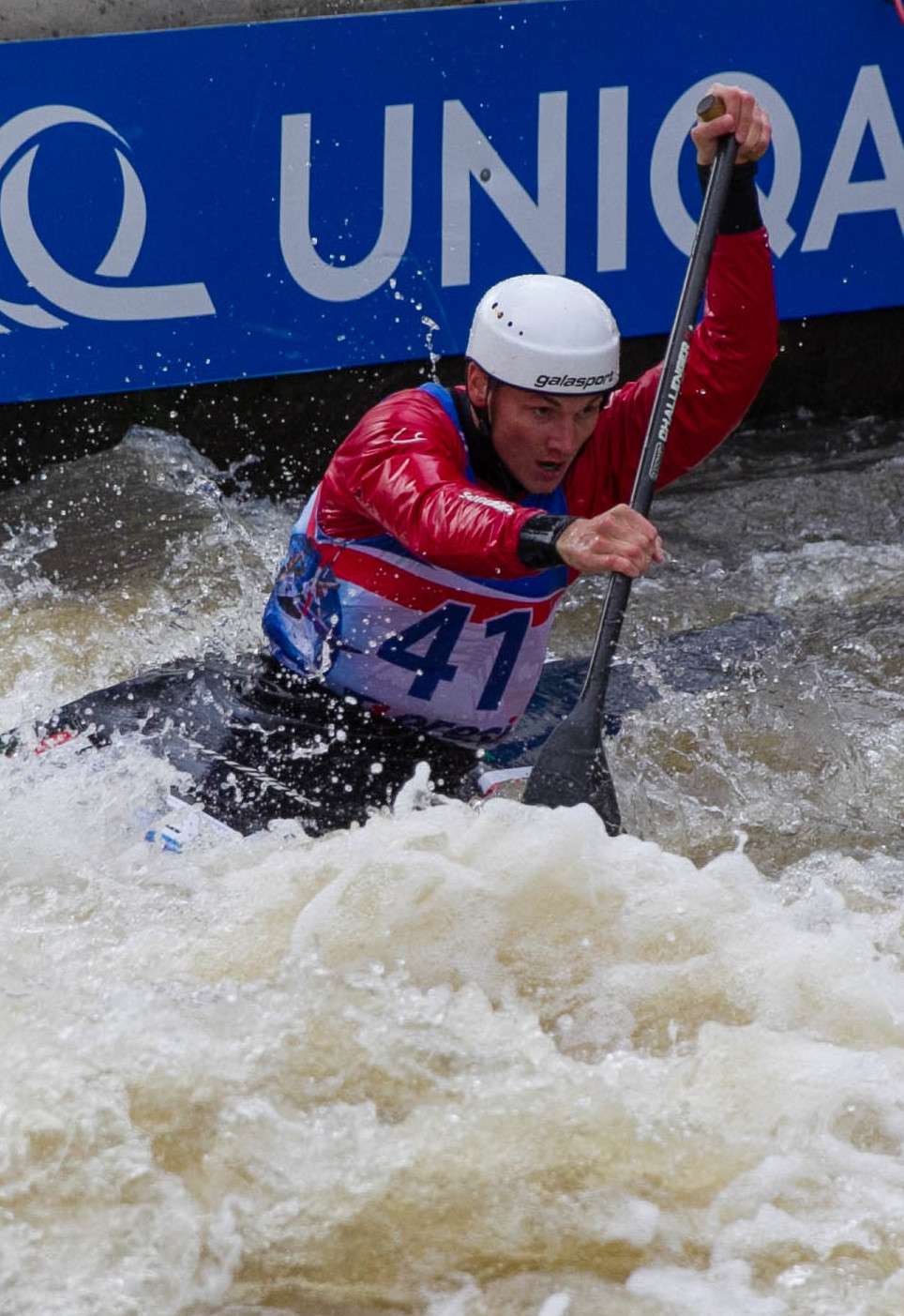

Personal information
- Nationality: Polish
- Born: 5 January 1993
- Died: January 26, 2018
- Height: 184 cm (6 ft 0 in)
- Weight: 88 kg (194 lb)

Sport
- Country: Poland
- Sport: Canoe slalom
- Event: C1, C2
- Club: Start Nowy Sacz
Medal record
Men's canoe slalom
Representing Poland
U23 World Championships
Silver medal – second place	2013 Liptovský Mikuláš	C1 team
Junior World Championships
Silver medal – second place	2010 Foix	C1
Silver medal – second place	2010 Foix	C1 team
Bronze medal – third place	2008 Roudnice nad Labem	C2 team
U23 European Championships
Gold medal – first place	2013 Bourg-Saint-Maurice	C2 team
Silver medal – second place	2013 Bourg-Saint-Maurice	C1 team
Junior European Championships
Gold medal – first place	2009 Liptovský Mikuláš	C1 team
Gold medal – first place	2010 Markkleeberg	C1
Silver medal – second place	2010 Markkleeberg	C1 team
Bronze medal – third place	2008 Solkan	C2 team

Kacper Gondek (5 January 1993 - 26 January 2018) was a Polish slalom canoeist who competed at the international level from 2008 to 2015.

He competed in C1 and C2 and had success in both categories at the junior and under-23 level, winning three silver medals at the World Championships (C1 Junior: 2010, C1 team Junior: 2010 and C1 team U23: 2013). His C2 partner was Wojciech Pasiut.

Kacper died on 26 January 2018 after succumbing to cancer.

His brother Kamil Gondek is also a former successful junior slalom canoeist from 2007 to 2010.
