= Luka Božič =

Slovenian canoeist

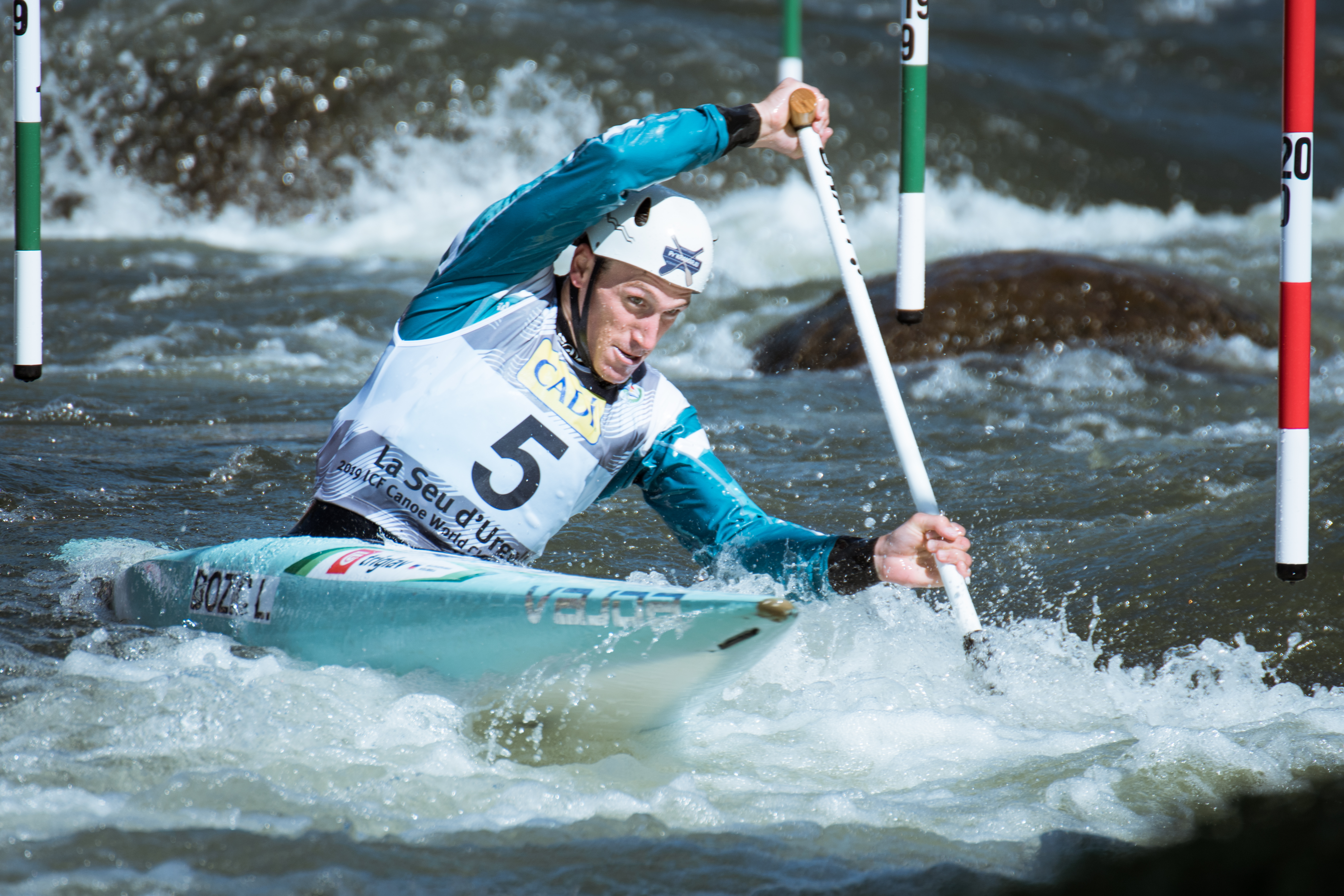

Personal information
- Nationality: Slovenian
- Born: 9 January 1991 (age 35) Šempeter pri Gorici, Yugoslavia
- Height: 1.73 m (5 ft 8 in)
- Weight: 72 kg (159 lb)

Sport
- Country: Slovenia
- Sport: Canoe slalom
- Event: C1, C2
- Club: KK Soske Elektrarne
Medal record
Men's canoe slalom
Representing Slovenia
World Championships
| Gold medal – first place | 2014 Deep Creek Lake | C2 |
| Gold medal – first place | 2022 Augsburg | C1 team |
| Silver medal – second place | 2018 Rio de Janeiro | C1 team |
| Bronze medal – third place | 2009 La Seu d'Urgell | C2 |
| Bronze medal – third place | 2014 Deep Creek Lake | C1 team |
| Bronze medal – third place | 2015 London | C1 team |
| Bronze medal – third place | 2019 La Seu d'Urgell | C1 |
| Bronze medal – third place | 2025 Penrith | C1 team |
European Championships
| Gold medal – first place | 2014 Vienna | C1 team |
| Gold medal – first place | 2019 Pau | C1 team |
| Gold medal – first place | 2020 Prague | C1 team |
| Gold medal – first place | 2024 Tacen | C1 team |
| Silver medal – second place | 2016 Liptovský Mikuláš | C2 |
| Silver medal – second place | 2017 Tacen | C1 team |
| Silver medal – second place | 2024 Tacen | C1 |
| Silver medal – second place | 2025 Vaires-sur-Marne | C1 team |
| Bronze medal – third place | 2013 Kraków | C1 team |
| Bronze medal – third place | 2014 Vienna | C2 |
| Bronze medal – third place | 2021 Ivrea | C1 team |
U23 World Championships
| Gold medal – first place | 2013 Liptovský Mikuláš | C1 team |
| Silver medal – second place | 2014 Penrith | C1 |
U23 European Championships
| Gold medal – first place | 2011 Banja Luka | C2 |
| Gold medal – first place | 2012 Solkan | C2 |
| Silver medal – second place | 2008 Solkan | C2 |
| Silver medal – second place | 2009 Liptovský Mikuláš | C2 |
Junior World Championships
| Bronze medal – third place | 2006 Solkan | C2 team |
Junior European Championships
| Gold medal – first place | 2006 Nottingham | C2 team |

Luka Božič (born 9 January 1991) is a Slovenian slalom canoeist who has competed at the international level since 2006. He started out as a C2 paddler partnering Sašo Taljat in the boat until the C2 event was discontinued in 2017. Since 2013 he has been competing internationally in C1.

He won eight medals at the ICF Canoe Slalom World Championships with two golds (C2: 2014, C1 team: 2022), a silver (C1 team: 2018) and five bronzes (C1: 2019, C2: 2009, C1 team: 2014, 2015, 2025). He also won 11 medals (4 golds, 4 silvers and 3 bronzes) at the European Championships.

Božič won the overall world cup title in the C1 class in 2023, becoming the first Slovenian to do so in single canoe.

At the 2012 Summer Olympics in London he competed in the C2 event where he finished in 8th place after being eliminated in the semi-final. Four years later in Rio de Janeiro he finished in 7th place in the same event.

== World Cup individual podiums ==
| | 1st place, gold medalist(s) | 2nd place, silver medalist(s) | 3rd place, bronze medalist(s) | Total |
| C1 | 5 | 4 | 7 | 16 |
| C2 | 2 | 3 | 5 | 10 |
| Total | 7 | 7 | 12 | 26 |

| Season | Date | Venue | Position | Event |
|---|---|---|---|---|
| 2011 | 3 July 2011 | L'Argentière-la-Bessée | 2nd | C2 |
| 2011 | 14 August 2011 | Prague | 1st | C2 |
| 2012 | 10 June 2012 | Cardiff | 2nd | C2 |
| 2012 | 26 August 2012 | Prague | 3rd | C2 |
| 2013 | 23 June 2013 | Cardiff | 3rd | C2 |
| 2013 | 7 July 2013 | La Seu d'Urgell | 3rd | C2 |
| 2013 | 18 August 2013 | Tacen | 3rd | C2 |
| 2014 | 8 June 2014 | Lee Valley | 1st | C2 |
| 2014 | 14 June 2014 | Tacen | 3rd | C1 |
| 2014 | 15 June 2014 | Tacen | 2nd | C2 |
| 2014 | 22 June 2014 | Prague | 3rd | C2 |
| 2018 | 7 July 2018 | Augsburg | 3rd | C1 |
| 2018 | 8 September 2018 | La Seu d'Urgell | 1st | C1 |
| 2019 | 22 June 2019 | Bratislava | 3rd | C1 |
| 2019 | 31 August 2019 | Markkleeberg | 2nd | C1 |
| 2019 | 7 September 2019 | Prague | 3rd | C1 |
| 2020 | 18 October 2020 | Tacen | 1st | C1 |
| 2021 | 12 September 2021 | Pau | 3rd | C1 |
| 2022 | 12 June 2022 | Prague | 1st | C1 |
| 2022 | 26 June 2022 | Tacen | 2nd | C1 |
| 2022 | 28 August 2022 | Pau | 2nd | C1 |
| 2022 | 4 September 2022 | La Seu d'Urgell | 3rd | C1 |
| 2023 | 16 June 2023 | Tacen | 1st | C1 |
| 2023 | 1 September 2023 | La Seu d'Urgell | 2nd | C1 |
| 2025 | 7 June 2025 | La Seu d'Urgell | 1st | C1 |
| 2026 | 30 May 2026 | Tacen | 3rd | C1 |
