= ICF World Junior and U23 Canoe Slalom Championships =

Canoe Slalom Championships

World Junior and U23 Canoe Slalom Championships
- Status: Active
- Genre: Sporting event
- Date: Mid-year
- Frequency: Annual
- Location: Varies
- Inaugurated: 1986 Spittal an der Drau / 2012 Wausau
- Previous event: 2026 Kraków
- Next event: 2027 Pattaya
- Organiser: Paddle Worldwide

The ICF World Junior and U23 Canoe Slalom Championships are an annual international canoeing and kayaking event organized by the International Canoe Federation (ICF). The Junior World Championships were first held in 1986 and then every two years until 2012. The Under-23 category has been added to the program in 2012. Since then the championships have been held annually. Athletes under the age of 18 are eligible for the junior category.

== Editions ==
| # U18 | # U23 | Year | Host | Events |
|---|---|---|---|---|
Biannual
| 1 | - | 1986 | Spittal an der Drau, Austria | 3 + 0 |
| 2 | - | 1988 | La Seu d'Urgell, Spain | 4 + 0 |
| 3 | - | 1990 | Tavanasa, Switzerland | 7 + 0 |
| 4 | - | 1992 | Sjoa, Norway | 7 + 0 |
| 5 | - | 1994 | Wausau, United States | 7 + 0 |
| 6 | - | 1996 | Lipno nad Vltavou, Czech Republic | 8 + 0 |
| 7 | - | 1998 | Lofer, Austria | 7 + 0 |
| 8 | - | 2000 | Bratislava, Slovakia | 8 + 0 |
| 9 | - | 2002 | Nowy Sącz, Poland | 8 + 0 |
| 10 | - | 2004 | Lofer, Austria | 6 + 0 |
| 11 | - | 2006 | Solkan, Slovenia | 8 + 0 |
| 12 | - | 2008 | Roudnice nad Labem, Czech Republic | 8 + 0 |
| 13 | - | 2010 | Foix, France | 9 + 0 |
Annual
| 14 | 1 | 2012 | Wausau, United States | 8 + 10 |
| 15 | 2 | 2013 | Liptovský Mikuláš, Slovakia | 10 + 9 |
| 16 | 3 | 2014 | Penrith, Australia | 8 + 8 |
| 17 | 4 | 2015 | Foz do Iguaçu, Brazil | 8 + 9 |
| 18 | 5 | 2016 | Kraków, Poland | 9 + 9 |
| 19 | 6 | 2017 | Bratislava, Slovakia | 8 + 10 |
| 20 | 7 | 2018 | Ivrea, Italy | 11 + 11 |
| 21 | 8 | 2019 | Kraków, Poland | 11 + 11 |
| 22 | 9 | 2021 | Tacen, Slovenia | 10 + 10 |
| 23 | 10 | 2022 | Ivrea, Italy | 10 + 10 |
| 24 | 11 | 2023 | Kraków, Poland | 10 + 10 |
| 25 | 12 | 2024 | Liptovský Mikuláš, Slovakia | 10 + 10 |
| 26 | 13 | 2025 | Foix, France | 12 + 12 |
| 27 | 14 | 2026 | Kraków, Poland | 12 + 12 |
| 28 | 15 | 2027 | Pattaya, Thailand | |
| 29 | 16 | 2028 | Kraków, Poland | |
| Total | | | 227 (U18) + 141 (U23) | 368 |

- 2020 in Tacen, Slovenia was cancelled.

== Medal tables ==
As of the 2026 Championships.

=== Junior ===
| Rank | Nation | Gold | Silver | Bronze | Total |
|---|---|---|---|---|---|
| 1 | Czech Republic | 61 | 46 | 43 | 150 |
| 2 | Germany | 33 | 41 | 37 | 111 |
| 3 | France | 27 | 32 | 33 | 92 |
| 4 | Slovenia | 20 | 12 | 16 | 48 |
| 5 | Slovakia | 19 | 18 | 16 | 53 |
| 6 | Poland | 12 | 17 | 14 | 43 |
| 7 | Great Britain | 9 | 10 | 15 | 34 |
| 8 | Italy | 8 | 5 | 7 | 20 |
| 9 | United States | 6 | 4 | 8 | 18 |
| 10 | Australia | 6 | 2 | 5 | 13 |
| 11 | Spain | 5 | 12 | 8 | 25 |
| 12 | West Germany | 4 | 2 | 3 | 9 |
| 13 | Czechoslovakia | 3 | 7 | 4 | 14 |
| 14 | Russia | 3 | 4 | 3 | 10 |
| 15 | Austria | 3 | 3 | 1 | 7 |
| 16 | Switzerland | 2 | 3 | 2 | 7 |
| 17 | Yugoslavia | 2 | 2 | 4 | 8 |
| 18 | China | 1 | 2 | 0 | 3 |
| 19 | Ukraine | 1 | 1 | 1 | 3 |
| 20 | Netherlands | 1 | 1 | 0 | 2 |
| 21 | Brazil | 1 | 0 | 2 | 3 |
| 22 | Ireland | 0 | 2 | 0 | 2 |
| 23 | New Zealand | 0 | 1 | 2 | 3 |
| 24 | Greece | 0 | 0 | 2 | 2 |
| 25 | Canada | 0 | 0 | 1 | 1 |
| Totals (25 entries) | | 227 | 227 | 227 | 681 |

=== Under 23 ===
| Rank | Nation | Gold | Silver | Bronze | Total |
|---|---|---|---|---|---|
| 1 | Czech Republic | 31 | 29 | 25 | 85 |
| 2 | France | 29 | 23 | 20 | 72 |
| 3 | Great Britain | 15 | 18 | 16 | 49 |
| 4 | Germany | 12 | 8 | 11 | 31 |
| 5 | Italy | 9 | 12 | 10 | 31 |
| 6 | Slovakia | 9 | 7 | 8 | 24 |
| 7 | Australia | 9 | 1 | 6 | 16 |
| 8 | Spain | 5 | 10 | 8 | 23 |
| 9 | Slovenia | 4 | 6 | 8 | 18 |
| 10 | Poland | 3 | 8 | 4 | 15 |
| 11 | Russia | 3 | 4 | 5 | 12 |
| 12 | Brazil | 3 | 2 | 3 | 8 |
| 13 | United States | 3 | 1 | 4 | 8 |
| 14 | Austria | 2 | 5 | 4 | 11 |
| 15 | Switzerland | 2 | 3 | 2 | 7 |
| 16 | New Zealand | 1 | 2 | 0 | 3 |
| 17 | Argentina | 1 | 0 | 0 | 1 |
| 18 | China | 0 | 2 | 2 | 4 |
| 19 | Ukraine | 0 | 1 | 0 | 1 |
| 20 | Andorra | 0 | 0 | 2 | 2 |
| 21 | Ireland | 0 | 0 | 1 | 1 |
| 21 | Sweden | 0 | 0 | 1 | 1 |
| Totals (22 entries) | | 141 | 142 | 140 | 423 |

=== Junior and Under 23 (Total) ===
| Rank | Nation | Gold | Silver | Bronze | Total |
|---|---|---|---|---|---|
| 1 | Czech Republic | 92 | 75 | 68 | 235 |
| 2 | France | 56 | 55 | 53 | 164 |
| 3 | Germany | 45 | 49 | 48 | 142 |
| 4 | Slovakia | 28 | 25 | 24 | 77 |
| 5 | Great Britain | 24 | 28 | 31 | 83 |
| 6 | Slovenia | 24 | 18 | 24 | 66 |
| 7 | Italy | 17 | 17 | 17 | 51 |
| 8 | Poland | 15 | 25 | 18 | 58 |
| 9 | Australia | 15 | 3 | 11 | 29 |
| 10 | Spain | 10 | 22 | 16 | 48 |
| 11 | United States | 9 | 5 | 12 | 26 |
| 12 | Russia | 6 | 8 | 8 | 22 |
| 13 | Austria | 5 | 8 | 5 | 18 |
| 14 | Switzerland | 4 | 6 | 4 | 14 |
| 15 | Brazil | 4 | 2 | 5 | 11 |
| 16 | West Germany | 4 | 2 | 3 | 9 |
| 17 | Czechoslovakia | 3 | 7 | 4 | 14 |
| 18 | Yugoslavia | 2 | 2 | 4 | 8 |
| 19 | China | 1 | 4 | 2 | 7 |
| 20 | New Zealand | 1 | 3 | 2 | 6 |
| 21 | Ukraine | 1 | 2 | 1 | 4 |
| 22 | Netherlands | 1 | 1 | 0 | 2 |
| 23 | Argentina | 1 | 0 | 0 | 1 |
| 24 | Ireland | 0 | 2 | 1 | 3 |
| 25 | Andorra | 0 | 0 | 2 | 2 |
| 25 | Greece | 0 | 0 | 2 | 2 |
| 27 | Canada | 0 | 0 | 1 | 1 |
| 27 | Sweden | 0 | 0 | 1 | 1 |
| Totals (28 entries) | | 368 | 369 | 367 | 1,104 |

== List of medalists ==
- List of ICF World Junior Canoe Slalom Championships medalists
- List of ICF World Under 23 Canoe Slalom Championships medalists

== See also ==
- ICF Canoe Slalom World Championships
- European Junior and U23 Canoe Slalom Championships
