= 2013 Canoe Slalom World Cup =

The 2013 Canoe Slalom World Cup was a series of five races in five canoeing and kayaking categories organized by the International Canoe Federation (ICF). It was the 26th edition. The team events were held as part of the world cup program for the first time in history, but no points were awarded for them.

== Calendar ==
The series opened with World Cup Race 1 in Cardiff, Wales (June 21–23) for the second year in a row and ended with the World Cup Final in Bratislava, Slovakia (August 23–25), also for the second consecutive year.

Label	Venue	Date
World Cup Race 1	(United Kingdom) Cardiff	21–23 June
World Cup Race 2	(Germany) Augsburg	28–30 June
World Cup Race 3	(Spain) La Seu d'Urgell	5–7 July
World Cup Race 4	(Slovenia) Tacen	16–18 August
World Cup Final	(Slovakia) Bratislava	23–25 August

== Final standings ==
The winner of each race was awarded 60 points. Points for lower places differed from one category to another. Every participant was guaranteed at least 2 points for participation and 5 points for qualifying for the semifinal run. If two or more athletes or boats were equal on points, the ranking was determined by their positions in the World Cup Final.

=== C1 men ===
Pos	Athlete	Points
1	Sideris Tasiadis (GER)	215
2	Matej Beňuš (SVK)	213
3	Anže Berčič (SLO)	208
4	David Florence (GBR)	206
5	Alexander Slafkovský (SVK)	206
6	Stanislav Ježek (CZE)	183
7	Ander Elosegi (ESP)	172
8	Denis Gargaud Chanut (FRA)	168
9	Benjamin Savšek (SLO)	157
10	Franz Anton (GER)	155

=== C1 women ===
Pos	Athlete	Points
1	Jessica Fox (AUS)	295
2	Kateřina Hošková (CZE)	234
3	Rosalyn Lawrence (AUS)	177
4	Katarína Macová (SVK)	171
5	Mallory Franklin (GBR)	160
6	Kimberley Woods (GBR)	140
7	Caroline Loir (FRA)	131
8	Alison Borrows (AUS)	118
9	Lena Stöcklin (GER)	104
10	Oriane Rebours (FRA)	95

=== C2 men ===
Pos	Athletes	Points
1	Gauthier Klauss/Matthieu Péché (FRA)	260
2	Luka Božič/Sašo Taljat (SLO)	222
3	Pavol Hochschorner/Peter Hochschorner (SVK)	189
4	Jonáš Kašpar/Marek Šindler (CZE)	169
5	Tomáš Kučera/Ján Bátik (SVK)	165
6	Ladislav Škantár/Peter Škantár (SVK)	165
7	Marcin Pochwała/Piotr Szczepański (POL)	143
8	Franz Anton/Jan Benzien (GER)	117
9	Pierre Labarelle/Nicolas Peschier (FRA)	112
10	David Florence/Richard Hounslow (GBR)	109

=== K1 men ===
Pos	Athlete	Points
1	Sebastian Schubert (GER)	240
2	Hannes Aigner (GER)	221
3	Fabian Dörfler (GER)	219
4	Peter Kauzer (SLO)	218
5	Fabien Lefèvre (USA)	198
6	Lucien Delfour (AUS)	188
7	Martin Albreht (SLO)	165
8	Paul Böckelmann (GER)	156
9	Michael Kurt (SUI)	149
10	Vavřinec Hradilek (CZE)	136

=== K1 women ===
Pos	Athlete	Points
1	Jana Dukátová (SVK)	211
2	Jessica Fox (AUS)	205
3	Jasmin Schornberg (GER)	201
4	Eva Terčelj (SLO)	182
5	Corinna Kuhnle (AUT)	180
6	Cindy Pöschel (GER)	157
7	Elena Kaliská (SVK)	150
8	Urša Kragelj (SLO)	146
9	Sarah Grant (AUS)	137
10	Štěpánka Hilgertová (CZE)	134

== Results ==
=== World Cup Race 1 ===
The opening race of the series took place at the Cardiff International White Water facility in Wales from 21 to 23 June. It featured the team events for the first time at a world cup meeting. The organizers experienced water pump problems during the C1 final which caused a lack of water on the course and a 30-minute delay of competition. Great Britain topped the medal table in the individual events with two golds, one silver and one bronze.

Event	Gold	Score	Silver	Score	Bronze	Score
C1 men	Stanislav Ježek (CZE)	93.95	Matej Beňuš (SVK)	93.98	Michal Jáně (CZE)	94.51
C1 women	Kimberley Woods (GBR)	112.57	Jessica Fox (AUS)	114.71	Mallory Franklin (GBR)	117.76
C2 men	Slovakia; Pavol Hochschorner; Peter Hochschorner	97.96	Great Britain; David Florence; Richard Hounslow	99.49	Slovenia; Luka Božič; Sašo Taljat	99.69
K1 men	Fabian Dörfler (GER)	87.11	Sebastian Schubert (GER)	88.45	Fabien Lefèvre (USA)	89.14
K1 women	Lizzie Neave (GBR)	97.93	Elena Kaliská (SVK)	98.31	Cindy Pöschel (GER)	100.25
C1 men team	Germany; Sideris Tasiadis; Jan Benzien; Franz Anton	102.31	Slovenia; Benjamin Savšek; Luka Božič; Anže Berčič	104.53	France; Simon Le Friec; Kilian Foulon; Jonathan Marc	106.88
C1 women team	France; Cécile Tixier; Claire Jacquet; Caroline Loir	202.44	Great Britain; Kimberley Woods; Mallory Franklin; Alice Spencer	211.52	-	
C2 men team	Slovakia; Pavol Hochschorner & Peter Hochschorner; Ladislav Škantár & Peter Škantár; Tomáš Kučera & Ján Bátik	124.88	Great Britain; David Florence & Richard Hounslow; Tim Baillie & Etienne Stott; Adam Burgess & Greg Pitt	131.85	France; Marc Biazizzo & Jimy Berçon; Yves Prigent & Loïc Kervella; Nicolas Scianimanico & Hugo Cailhol	179.87
K1 men team	Germany; Sebastian Schubert; Fabian Dörfler; Hannes Aigner	101.41	Slovenia; Peter Kauzer; Janoš Peterlin; Martin Albreht	105.77	Poland; Grzegorz Polaczyk; Rafał Polaczyk; Dariusz Popiela	107.21
K1 women team	Germany; Jasmin Schornberg; Cindy Pöschel; Claudia Bär	114.12	Great Britain; Fiona Pennie; Bethan Latham; Lizzie Neave	125.42	Slovakia; Jana Dukátová; Elena Kaliská; Kristína Nevařilová	126.14

=== World Cup Race 2 ===
Augsburg Eiskanal hosted the second world cup race of the season from 28 to 30 June. France won two golds and one bronze in the individual events to top the medal table.

Event	Gold	Score	Silver	Score	Bronze	Score
C1 men	Alexander Slafkovský (SVK)	102.46	Matej Beňuš (SVK)	104.10	Sideris Tasiadis (GER)	104.30
C1 women	Jessica Fox (AUS)	132.69	Mallory Franklin (GBR)	135.06	Kimberley Woods (GBR)	135.55
C2 men	France; Gauthier Klauss; Matthieu Péché	113.86	Great Britain; Tim Baillie; Etienne Stott	114.28	Poland; Marcin Pochwała; Piotr Szczepański	114.63
K1 men	Paul Böckelmann (GER)	97.59	Sebastian Schubert (GER)	98.85	Mathieu Biazizzo (FRA)	100.19
K1 women	Émilie Fer (FRA)	112.53	Jasmin Schornberg (GER)	112.96	Cindy Pöschel (GER)	115.30
C1 men team	Slovenia; Benjamin Savšek; Anže Berčič; Luka Božič	117.25	France; Denis Gargaud Chanut; Jonathan Marc; Nicolas Peschier	118.62	Slovakia; Alexander Slafkovský; Matej Beňuš; Jerguš Baďura	118.76
C1 women team	France; Caroline Loir; Oriane Rebours; Claire Jacquet	209.21	Great Britain; Kimberley Woods; Mallory Franklin; Jasmine Royle	213.65	Germany; Mira Louen; Lena Stöcklin; Birgit Ohmayer	215.29
C2 men team	France; Nicolas Peschier & Pierre Labarelle; Gauthier Klauss & Matthieu Péché; Pierre Picco & Hugo Biso	133.97	Germany; Franz Anton & Jan Benzien; Kai Müller & Kevin Müller; Eric Mendel & Alexander Funk	142.05	Czech Republic; Ondřej Karlovský & Jakub Jáně; Jaroslav Volf & Ondřej Štěpánek; Jonáš Kašpar & Marek Šindler	143.51
K1 men team	France; Boris Neveu; Étienne Daille; Mathieu Biazizzo	109.04	Germany; Sebastian Schubert; Fabian Dörfler; Hannes Aigner	113.78	Poland; Grzegorz Polaczyk; Rafał Polaczyk; Dariusz Popiela	114.01
K1 women team	Germany; Jasmin Schornberg; Cindy Pöschel; Claudia Bär	126.64	Czech Republic; Štěpánka Hilgertová; Kateřina Kudějová; Eva Ornstová	133.60	Great Britain; Kimberley Woods; Bethan Latham; Mallory Franklin	152.87

=== World Cup Race 3 ===
The third world cup race took place at the site of the 1992 Olympic race, the Segre Olympic Park in La Seu d'Urgell from 5 to 7 July. Slovenia won the medal table in the individual events with two golds and one bronze.

Event	Gold	Score	Silver	Score	Bronze	Score
C1 men	Anže Berčič (SLO)	99.67	Ander Elosegi (ESP)	100.96	Sideris Tasiadis (GER)	101.92
C1 women	Jessica Fox (AUS)	121.17	Caroline Loir (FRA)	124.02	Kateřina Hošková (CZE)	124.80
C2 men	France; Gauthier Klauss; Matthieu Péché	105.48	France; Nicolas Peschier; Pierre Labarelle	106.69	Slovenia; Luka Božič; Sašo Taljat	107.68
K1 men	Vavřinec Hradilek (CZE)	94.04	Lucien Delfour (AUS)	95.35	Samuel Hernanz (ESP)	95.60
K1 women	Eva Terčelj (SLO)	106.93	Lizzie Neave (GBR)	109.19	Kateřina Kudějová (CZE)	110.76
C1 men team	Slovenia; Benjamin Savšek; Luka Božič; Anže Berčič	113.41	Slovakia; Matej Beňuš; Alexander Slafkovský; Jerguš Baďura	113.54	Czech Republic; Stanislav Ježek; Vítězslav Gebas; Michal Jáně	119.14
C1 women team	France; Caroline Loir; Oriane Rebours; Cécile Tixier	153.01	Spain; Núria Vilarrubla; Miren Lazkano; Annebel van der Knijff	265.27	-	
C2 men team	Slovakia; Pavol Hochschorner & Peter Hochschorner; Ladislav Škantár & Peter Škantár; Tomáš Kučera & Ján Bátik	122.05	Czech Republic; Ondřej Karlovský & Jakub Jáně; Jaroslav Volf & Ondřej Štěpánek; Jonáš Kašpar & Marek Šindler	133.32	Russia; Dmitry Larionov & Mikhail Kuznetsov; Aleksei Afanasiev & Stanislav Senkin; Pavel Eigel & Ruslan Sayfiev	146.81
K1 men team	Spain; Samuel Hernanz; Joan Crespo; Marc Domenjó	107.33	Germany; Sebastian Schubert; Fabian Dörfler; Hannes Aigner	108.64	Czech Republic; Jiří Prskavec; Vavřinec Hradilek; Vít Přindiš	109.29
K1 women team	France; Nouria Newman; Marie-Zélia Lafont; Émilie Fer	125.24	Great Britain; Fiona Pennie; Louise Donington; Lizzie Neave	131.91	Russia; Aleksandra Perova; Ekaterina Perova; Marta Kharitonova	135.66

=== World Cup Race 4 ===
The penultimate world cup race took place in Tacen, Slovenia from 16 to 18 August. The organizers were forced to re-run the final races of the women's K1 event and the men's C2 event due to troubles with the water level. For the same reason the team events in these two disciplines have been cancelled. The women's C1 team event did not take place due to lack of participating teams. Slovenia won two golds and two bronzes in the individual events which was enough to win the medal table. Jessica Fox won both the K1 and the C1 event, becoming the first female paddler to win both events at one world cup race.

Event	Gold	Score	Silver	Score	Bronze	Score
C1 men	Anže Berčič (SLO)	108.28	Franz Anton (GER)	109.56	Matija Marinić (CRO)	109.94
C1 women	Jessica Fox (AUS)	132.69	Mallory Franklin (GBR)	135.04	Monika Jančová (CZE)	138.13
C2 men	France; Gauthier Klauss; Matthieu Péché	117.41	Poland; Filip Brzeziński; Andrzej Brzeziński	118.70	Slovenia; Sašo Taljat; Luka Božič	120.61
K1 men	Peter Kauzer (SLO)	99.87	Fabian Dörfler (GER)	102.91	Hannes Aigner (GER)	105.46
K1 women	Jessica Fox (AUS)	117.60	Corinna Kuhnle (AUT)	117.94	Eva Terčelj (SLO)	119.37
C1 men team	Slovenia; Benjamin Savšek; Luka Božič; Anže Berčič	121.55	Slovakia; Matej Beňuš; Alexander Slafkovský; Jerguš Baďura	125.57	Germany; Sideris Tasiadis; Jan Benzien; Franz Anton	125.91
K1 men team	Germany; Sebastian Schubert; Fabian Dörfler; Hannes Aigner	114.53	Slovenia; Peter Kauzer; Janoš Peterlin; Martin Albreht	115.34	Italy; Giovanni De Gennaro; Andrea Romeo; Diego Paolini	115.83

=== World Cup Final ===
The world cup final took place in Bratislava, Slovakia from 23 to 25 August. The home paddlers won the individual medal table with two golds, one silver and one bronze. Michal Martikán made his first competitive appearance since the London Olympics and he won the C1 event. The women's C1 team event did not take place. Both teams which entered the competition (Germany and Great Britain) did not start.

Event	Gold	Score	Silver	Score	Bronze	Score
C1 men	Michal Martikán (SVK)	101.38	David Florence (GBR)	102.04	Matej Beňuš (SVK)	102.45
C1 women	Jessica Fox (AUS)	119.59	Kateřina Hošková (CZE)	131.56	Jasmine Royle (GBR)	133.91
C2 men	Slovakia; Pavol Hochschorner; Peter Hochschorner	107.98	Czech Republic; Jonáš Kašpar; Marek Šindler	109.39	France; Gauthier Klauss; Matthieu Péché	109.55
K1 men	Sebastian Schubert (GER)	98.44	Peter Kauzer (SLO)	98.91	Mateusz Polaczyk (POL)	99.98
K1 women	Émilie Fer (FRA)	106.54	Jana Dukátová (SVK)	109.79	Jasmin Schornberg (GER)	110.66
C1 men team	France; Denis Gargaud Chanut; Jonathan Marc; Nicolas Peschier	114.84	Slovenia; Benjamin Savšek; Luka Božič; Anže Berčič	115.50	Germany; Sideris Tasiadis; Jan Benzien; Franz Anton	118.48
C2 men team	France; Pierre Labarelle & Nicolas Peschier; Gauthier Klauss & Matthieu Péché; Pierre Picco & Hugo Biso	124.98	Poland; Marcin Pochwała & Piotr Szczepański; Filip Brzeziński & Andrzej Brzeziński; Michał Wiercioch & Grzegorz Majerczak	128.79	Slovakia; Pavol Hochschorner & Peter Hochschorner; Ladislav Škantár & Peter Škantár; Tomáš Kučera & Ján Bátik	135.06
K1 men team	Poland; Grzegorz Polaczyk; Mateusz Polaczyk; Dariusz Popiela	111.66	United States; Fabien Lefèvre; Richard Powell; Michal Smolen	111.67	France; Boris Neveu; Étienne Daille; Mathieu Biazizzo	112.05
K1 women team	France; Émilie Fer; Marie-Zélia Lafont; Nouria Newman	126.07	Austria; Violetta Oblinger-Peters; Corinna Kuhnle; Viktoria Wolffhardt	126.33	Slovakia; Elena Kaliská; Jana Dukátová; Kristína Nevařilová	127.61
