= Kristína Nevařilová =

Slovak slalom canoeist (born 1991)

Personal information
- Nationality: Slovak
- Born: 9 November 1991 (age 34)

Sport
- Country: Slovakia
- Sport: Canoe slalom
- Event: K1, C1
- Club: ŠCP
Medal record
Women's canoe slalom
Representing Slovakia
World Championships
Bronze medal – third place	2014 Deep Creek Lake	K1 team
European Championships
Gold medal – first place	2015 Markkleeberg	K1 team
Bronze medal – third place	2016 Liptovský Mikuláš	K1 team

Kristína Nevařilová (born 9 November 1991) is a Slovak slalom canoeist who has competed at the international level from 2007 to 2018, specializing primarily in the K1 discipline.

She won a bronze medal in the K1 team event at the 2014 ICF Canoe Slalom World Championships at Deep Creek Lake. She also won a gold and a bronze in the same event at the European Championships.

== Major championships results timeline ==
Event		2010	2011	2012	2013	2014	2015	2016
World Championships	K1	—	—	Not held	23	20	37	Not held
World Championships	K1 team	—	—	Not held	6	3	5	Not held
European Championships	C1	7	—	—	—	—	—	—
European Championships	K1	—	—	—	23	29	25	11
European Championships	K1 team	—	—	—	4	7	1	3
