= 2011 Canoe Slalom World Cup =

Sporting event results

The 2011 Canoe Slalom World Cup was a series of four races in five canoeing and kayaking categories organized by the International Canoe Federation (ICF). It was the 24th edition.

== Calendar ==
The series opened with World Cup Race 1 in Tacen, Slovenia (24–26 June) and ended with the World Cup Final in Prague, Czech Republic (12–14 August). The World Cup Final held a special status as the tie-breaker.

Label	Venue	Date
World Cup Race 1	(Slovenia) Tacen	24–26 June
World Cup Race 2	(France) L'Argentière-la-Bessée	1–3 July
World Cup Race 3	(Germany) Markkleeberg	8–10 July
World Cup Final	(Czech Republic) Prague	12–14 August

== Final standings ==
The winner of each race was awarded 60 points. Points for lower places differed from one category to another. Every participant was guaranteed at least two points for participation and five points for qualifying for the semifinal run. If two or more athletes or boats had the same number of points at the end of the series, the athletes or boats with the better result in the World Cup Final were awarded the higher position.

=== C1 men ===
Pos	Athlete	Points
1	Stanislav Ježek (CZE)	172
2	Matej Beňuš (SVK)	172
3	Alexander Slafkovský (SVK)	154
4	Denis Gargaud Chanut (FRA)	131
5	Nicolas Peschier (FRA)	126
6	Benjamin Savšek (SLO)	126
7	Grzegorz Kiljanek (POL)	119
8	Jan Benzien (GER)	118
9	Christos Tsakmakis (GRE)	115
10	Tomáš Indruch (CZE)	111

=== C1 women ===
Pos	Athlete	Points
1	Rosalyn Lawrence (AUS)	225
2	Leanne Guinea (AUS)	189
3	Katarína Macová (SVK)	173
4	Kateřina Hošková (CZE)	146
5	Caroline Loir (FRA)	128
6	Jessica Fox (AUS)	120
7	Mallory Franklin (GBR)	117
8	Lena Stöcklin (GER)	105
9	Teng Qianqian (CHN)	84
10	Oriane Rebours (FRA)	84

=== C2 men ===
Pos	Athletes	Points
1	Pavol Hochschorner/Peter Hochschorner (SVK)	170
2	Gauthier Klauss/Matthieu Péché (FRA)	150
3	Tomáš Koplík/Jakub Vrzáň (CZE)	143
4	Ladislav Škantár/Peter Škantár (SVK)	141
5	Sašo Taljat/Luka Božič (SLO)	138
6	Piotr Szczepański/Marcin Pochwała (POL)	130
7	Pierre Labarelle/Nicolas Peschier (FRA)	118
8	Mathieu Fougere/Thomas Fougere (FRA)	112
9	Hugo Biso/Pierre Picco (FRA)	107
10	Andrea Benetti/Erik Masoero (ITA)	106

=== K1 men ===
Pos	Athlete	Points
1	Peter Kauzer (SLO)	177
2	Vavřinec Hradilek (CZE)	176
3	Daniele Molmenti (ITA)	163
4	Dariusz Popiela (POL)	145
5	Jure Meglič (SLO)	143
6	Sebastian Schubert (GER)	126
7	Luboš Hilgert (CZE)	123
8	Jiří Prskavec (CZE)	115
9	Pierre Bourliaud (FRA)	114
10	Scott Parsons (USA)	107

=== K1 women ===
Pos	Athlete	Points
1	Jana Dukátová (SVK)	217
2	Dana Mann (SVK)	174
3	Corinna Kuhnle (AUT)	163
4	Melanie Pfeifer (GER)	150
5	Irena Pavelková (CZE)	133
6	Štěpánka Hilgertová (CZE)	125
7	Eva Terčelj (SLO)	118
8	Claudia Bär (GER)	107
9	Kateřina Kudějová (CZE)	106
10	Maialen Chourraut (ESP)	105

== Results ==
=== World Cup Race 1 ===
The series opener took place in Tacen, Slovenia on 24–26 June. The five gold medals went to five different countries. Slovakia was the most successful country with a gold, a silver and three bronzes. The home nation won three medals, one of each color.

Event	Gold	Score	Silver	Score	Bronze	Score
C1 men	David Florence (GBR)	100.85	Stanislav Ježek (CZE)	101.24	Alexander Slafkovský (SVK)	101.48
C1 women	Rosalyn Lawrence (AUS)	126.44	Leanne Guinea (AUS)	126.75	Katarína Macová (SVK)	138.14
C2 men	Slovakia; Pavol Hochschorner; Peter Hochschorner	104.89	France; Hugo Biso; Pierre Picco	107.58	Slovakia; Ladislav Škantár; Peter Škantár	107.97
K1 men	Peter Kauzer (SLO)	95.48	Jure Meglič (SLO)	98.81	Sebastian Schubert (GER)	99.57
K1 women	Melanie Pfeifer (GER)	108.14	Dana Mann (SVK)	108.66	Urša Kragelj (SLO)	109.51

=== World Cup Race 2 ===
The second race of the series took place in L'Argentière-la-Bessée, France on 1–3 July. Slovakia was again the most successful country with two golds. The home team of France won one gold and one bronze medal.

Event	Gold	Score	Silver	Score	Bronze	Score
C1 men	Matej Beňuš (SVK)	111.65	Ander Elosegi (ESP)	113.37	Stanislav Ježek (CZE)	114.12
C1 women	Jessica Fox (AUS)	136.62	Rosalyn Lawrence (AUS)	139.48	Leanne Guinea (AUS)}	146.62
C2 men	France; Gauthier Klauss; Matthieu Péché	116.68	Slovenia; Sašo Taljat; Luka Božič	117.01	France; Hugo Biso; Pierre Picco	117.55
K1 men	Peter Kauzer (SLO)	108.03	Samuel Hernanz (ESP)	108.28	Luboš Hilgert (CZE)	109.14
K1 women	Jana Dukátová (SVK)	118.32	Maialen Chourraut (ESP)	119.59	Kateřina Kudějová (CZE)	119.73

=== World Cup Race 3 ===
The penultimate race of the series took place in Markkleeberg, Germany on 8–10 July. Michal Martikán and Tony Estanguet made their only appearance in the 2011 world cup season here. Slovakia won the medal table for the third consecutive time with three golds. Germany won one silver medal on home water.

Event	Gold	Score	Silver	Score	Bronze	Score
C1 men	Michal Martikán (SVK)	101.46	Jan Benzien (GER)	102.68	Tony Estanguet (FRA)	103.64
C1 women	Jessica Fox (AUS)	136.20	Caroline Loir (FRA)	141.39	Rosalyn Lawrence (AUS)	143.26
C2 men	Slovakia; Pavol Hochschorner; Peter Hochschorner	114.29	France; Pierre Labarelle; Nicolas Peschier	115.75	Poland; Piotr Szczepański; Marcin Pochwała	115.91
K1 men	Pierre Bourliaud (FRA)	97.58	Boris Neveu (FRA)	97.85	Dariusz Popiela (POL)	99.67
K1 women	Jana Dukátová (SVK)	111.17	Corinna Kuhnle (AUT)	114.37	Maialen Chourraut (ESP)	115.21

=== World Cup Final ===
The World Cup Final took place in Prague, Czech Republic on 12–14 August. The overall world cup winners for 2011 were determined here. Slovakia took the medal table for the fourth consecutive time with two golds and a silver. The home Czech paddlers managed to win one gold and two silvers.

Event	Gold	Score	Silver	Score	Bronze	Score
C1 men	Alexander Slafkovský (SVK)	94.85	Denis Gargaud Chanut (FRA)	94.93	David Florence (GBR)	96.50
C1 women	Rosalyn Lawrence (AUS)	118.10	Kateřina Hošková (CZE)	121.20	Caroline Loir (FRA)	128.77
C2 men	Slovenia; Sašo Taljat; Luka Božič	100.86	Czech Republic; Tomáš Koplík; Jakub Vrzáň	102.99	United Kingdom; David Florence; Richard Hounslow	103.34
K1 men	Vavřinec Hradilek (CZE)	88.60	Daniele Molmenti (ITA)	88.65	Peter Kauzer (SLO)	90.02
K1 women	Elena Kaliská (SVK)	105.59	Jana Dukátová (SVK)	106.04	Marta Kharitonova (RUS)	106.71
