= Stefanie Horn =

German-Italian slalom canoeist (born 1991)

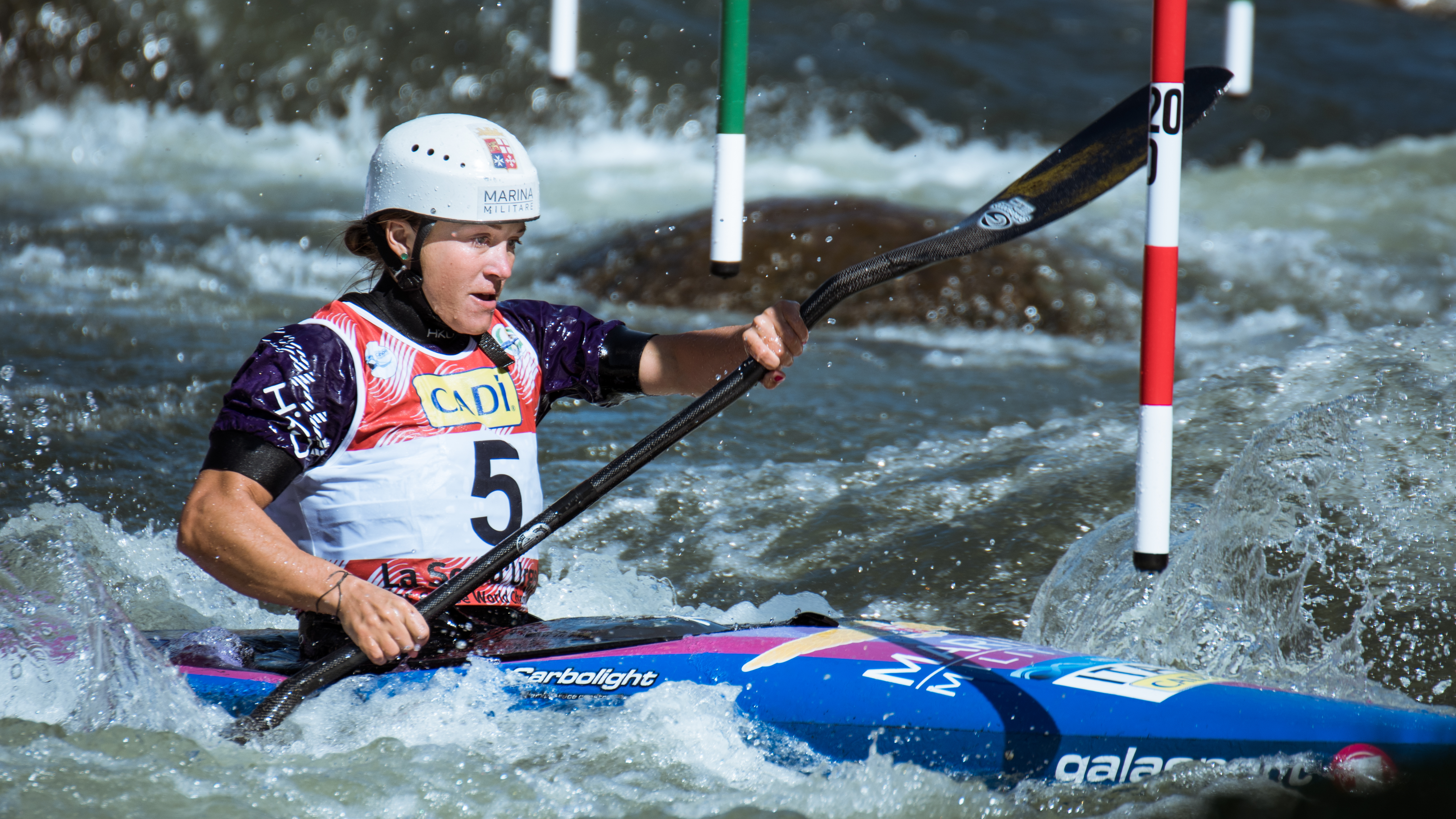
- Stefanie Horn at the 2019 Canoe Slalom World Championships

Personal information
- Nationality: Italian
- Born: 9 January 1991 (age 35) Bottrop, Germany

Sport
- Country: Italy
- Sport: Canoe slalom
- Event: K1, Kayak cross
Medal record
Women's canoe slalom
Representing Germany
U23 European Championships
Gold medal – first place	2012 Solkan	K1 team
Silver medal – second place	2010 Markkleeberg	K1 team
Bronze medal – third place	2011 Banja Luka	K1 team
Junior World Championships
Silver medal – second place	2008 Roudnice nad Labem	K1
Bronze medal – third place	2008 Roudnice nad Labem	K1 team
Junior European Championships
Gold medal – first place	2006 Nottingham	K1 team
Gold medal – first place	2008 Solkan	K1 team
Gold medal – first place	2009 Liptovský Mikuláš	K1
Bronze medal – third place	2007 Kraków	K1
Bronze medal – third place	2008 Solkan	K1
Representing Italy
World Championships
Silver medal – second place	2017 Pau	Mixed C2
European Games
Bronze medal – third place	2023 Kraków	Kayak cross
European Championships
Gold medal – first place	2022 Liptovský Mikuláš	K1
Silver medal – second place	2013 Kraków	K1
Silver medal – second place	2017 Tacen	K1
Silver medal – second place	2026 Ivrea	K1 team
U23 World Championships
Silver medal – second place	2013 Liptovský Mikuláš	K1
U23 European Championships
Gold medal – first place	2014 Skopje	K1
Silver medal – second place	2013 Bourg St. Maurice	K1 team

Stefanie Horn (born 9 January 1991 in Bottrop, Germany) is a German-Italian slalom canoeist who competed for Germany from 2006 to 2012. She has represented Italy since 2013. She competed at three Summer Olympics.

Horn is an athlete of the Gruppo Sportivo della Marina Militare,

== Career ==
Horn won a silver medal in the Mixed C2 event at the 2017 ICF Canoe Slalom World Championships in Pau together with Niccolò Ferrari.

She also won five medals (1-3-1) at the European Championships, including a bronze in kayak cross at the 2023 European Games in Kraków.

Horn competed at three Olympic games. She finished 8th in the K1 event at the 2016 Summer Olympics in Rio de Janeiro and 4th in the K1 event at the 2020 Summer Olympics in Tokyo. She also competed at the 2024 Summer Olympics in Paris, finishing 5th in the K1 event and 16th in kayak cross.

== World Cup individual podiums ==
Season	Date	Venue	Position	Event
2018	30 Jun 2018	Kraków	3rd	K1
2019	29 June 2019	Tacen	1st	K1
2019	31 August 2019	Markkleeberg	3rd	K1
2023	2 June 2023	Augsburg	2nd	K1
2023	4 June 2023	Augsburg	1st	Kayak cross
2023	11 June 2023	Prague	3rd	Kayak cross
2023	2 September 2023	La Seu d'Urgell	3rd	K1
2024	14 September 2024	Ivrea	1st	K1

== Personal life ==
Her older sister Jacqueline represented Germany in canoe slalom.
