= 2009 European Junior and U23 Canoe Slalom Championships =

- Location: Liptovský Mikuláš, Slovakia

The 2009 European Junior and U23 Canoe Slalom Championships took place in Liptovský Mikuláš, Slovakia from 22 to 26 July 2009 under the auspices of the European Canoe Association (ECA) at the Ondrej Cibak Whitewater Slalom Course. It was the 11th edition of the competition for Juniors (U18) and the 7th edition for the Under 23 category. A total of 16 medal events took place.

== Medal summary ==
=== Men ===
==== Canoe ====
===== Junior =====
Event	Gold		Silver		Bronze	
C1	Patrik Gajarský (SVK)	107.37	Ruslan Sayfiev (RUS)	109.42	Jeremy Moreaux (FRA)	112.53
C1 team	Poland; Kacper Gondek; Arkadiusz Nieć; Konrad Bobrowski	122.56	Czech Republic; Martin Říha; František Jordán; Michal Pešek	123.40	Russia; Ruslan Sayfiev; Alexey Shimko; Kirill Setkin	124.44
C2	Jonáš Kašpar/Marek Šindler (CZE)	115.55	Dariusz Chlebek/Patryk Brzeziński (POL)	118.76	Rhys Davies/Matthew Lister (GBR)	118.96
C2 team	Poland; Dariusz Chlebek/Patryk Brzeziński; Kamil Gondek/Andrzej Poparda; Filip Brzeziński/Andrzej Brzeziński	129.18	Czech Republic; Jonáš Kašpar/Marek Šindler; Martin Říha/Jaroslav Strnad; Jakub Hojda/Tomáš Macášek	141.24	Germany; Elias Putz/Sebastian Böhm; Gabriel Holzapfel/Merlin Holzapfel; Holger Gerdes/Jan-Phillip Eckert	144.48

===== U23 =====
Event	Gold		Silver		Bronze	
C1	Matej Beňuš (SVK)	104.64	Karol Rozmuš (SVK)	105.90	Ander Elosegi (ESP)	106.54
C1 team	Slovenia; Benjamin Savšek; Jure Lenarčič; Anže Berčič	115.47	France; Denis Gargaud Chanut; Pierre-Antoine Tillard; Pierre Berthelot-Kleck	119.02	Russia; Pavel Bizyaev; Maxim Obraztsov; Stepan Novikov	119.82
C2	Kai Müller/Kevin Müller (GER)	113.56	Luka Božič/Sašo Taljat (SLO)	115.41	Robert Gotvald/Jan Vlček (CZE)	115.60
C2 team	France; Hugo Biso/Pierre Picco; Aymeric Maynadier/Sébastien Perilhou; Mathieu Fougere/Thomas Fougere	122.81	Germany; Mathias Westphal/Paul Jork; Simon Auerbach/Florian Schubert; Kai Müller/Kevin Müller	130.14	Czech Republic; Robert Gotvald/Jan Vlček; Tomáš Koplík/Jakub Vrzáň; Ondřej Karlovský/Jakub Jáně	136.82

==== Kayak ====
===== Junior =====
Event	Gold		Silver		Bronze	
K1	Martin Halčin (SVK)	98.81	Michał Pasiut (POL)	101.00	Tobias Kargl (GER)	103.51
K1 team	Italy; Zeno Ivaldi; Luca Colazingari; Giovanni De Gennaro	115.38	Great Britain; Thomas Brady; Joe Clarke; Joseph Coombs	115.45	Slovakia; Martin Halčin; Matúš Hujsa; Filip Machaj	118.25

===== U23 =====
Event	Gold		Silver		Bronze	
K1	Vavřinec Hradilek (CZE)	96.38	Boris Neveu (FRA)	100.94	Samuel Hernanz (ESP)	101.80
K1 team	France; Sébastien Combot; Boris Neveu; Benoît Guillaume	105.93	Germany; Jürgen Kraus; Paul Böckelmann; Hannes Aigner	110.25	Slovenia; Martin Albreht; Simon Artelj; Gregor Brovinsky	110.64

=== Women ===
==== Kayak ====
===== Junior =====
Event	Gold		Silver		Bronze	
K1	Stefanie Horn (GER)	114.74	Nouria Newman (FRA)	118.04	Ricarda Funk (GER)	118.99
K1 team	France; Estelle Mangin; Nouria Newman; Gaelle Tosser-Roussey	132.89	Great Britain; Natalie Wilson; Claire Kimberley; Bethan Latham	136.18	Czech Republic; Anna Bustová; Pavlína Zástěrová; Barbora Valíková	138.81

===== U23 =====
Event	Gold		Silver		Bronze	
K1	Kateřina Kudějová (CZE)	109.28	Cindy Pöschel (GER)	111.51	Natalia Pacierpnik (POL)	113.00
K1 team	Germany; Cindy Pöschel; Michaela Grimm; Jacqueline Horn	131.55	France; Marie-Zélia Lafont; Caroline Loir; Laura Mangin	135.03	Czech Republic; Eva Ornstová; Kateřina Kudějová; Miroslava Urbanová	136.54

== Medal table ==
Rank	Nation	Gold	Silver	Bronze	Total
1	France (FRA)	3	4	1	8
2	Germany (GER)	3	3	3	9
3	Czech Republic (CZE)	3	2	4	9
4	Slovakia (SVK)	3	1	1	5
5	Poland (POL)	2	2	1	5
6	Slovenia (SLO)	1	1	1	3
7	Italy (ITA)	1	0	0	1
8	Great Britain (GBR)	0	2	1	3
9	Russia (RUS)	0	1	2	3
10	Spain (ESP)	0	0	2	2
Totals (10 entries)		16	16	16	48
