= 2021 European Canoe Slalom Championships =

2021 European Championships
- Venue: Ivrea Whitewater Stadium
- Location: Ivrea, Italy
- Dates: 6 to 9 May 2021

The 2021 European Canoe Slalom Championships took place from 6 to 9 May 2021 in Ivrea, Italy under the auspices of the European Canoe Association (ECA). It was the 22nd edition of the competition. Ivrea hosted the event for the first time. The extreme canoe slalom events made their debut at the European Championships (formerly known as Extreme K1).

This event also served as the European qualification for the postponed 2020 Summer Olympics in Tokyo.

== Medals Table ==
* Host nation (Italy)

Rank	Nation	Gold	Silver	Bronze	Total
1	Czech Republic	4	1	2	7
2	Slovakia	2	1	0	3
3	Austria	1	2	0	3
4	Great Britain	1	1	2	4
5	France	1	0	1	2
6	Spain	1	0	0	1
7	Italy*	0	2	0	2
8	Germany	0	1	3	4
9	Slovenia	0	1	2	3
10	Switzerland	0	1	0	1
Totals (10 entries)		10	10	10	30

== Medal summary ==
=== Men ===
==== Canoe ====
Event	Gold		Silver		Bronze	
C1	Denis Gargaud Chanut; France	87.55	Matej Beňuš; Slovakia	88.65	Sideris Tasiadis; Germany	89.47
C1 team	Slovakia; Alexander Slafkovský; Michal Martikán; Matej Beňuš	91.86	Italy; Roberto Colazingari; Raffaello Ivaldi; Flavio Micozzi	96.01	Slovenia; Benjamin Savšek; Luka Božič; Nejc Polenčič	99.38

==== Kayak ====
Event	Gold		Silver		Bronze	
K1	Vít Přindiš; Czech Republic	81.90	Giovanni De Gennaro; Italy	82.65	Peter Kauzer; Slovenia	82.92
K1 team	Czech Republic; Jiří Prskavec; Vavřinec Hradilek; Vít Přindiš	88.54	Germany; Hannes Aigner; Tim Maxeiner; Stefan Hengst	90.16	Great Britain; Bradley Forbes-Cryans; Joe Clarke; Christopher Bowers	90.85
Extreme Canoe Slalom	Vít Přindiš; Czech Republic		Dimitri Marx; Switzerland		Joe Clarke; Great Britain	

=== Women ===
==== Canoe ====
Event	Gold		Silver		Bronze	
C1	Miren Lazkano; Spain	102.15	Tereza Fišerová; Czech Republic	102.51	Elena Apel; Germany	104.01
C1 team	Slovakia; Simona Glejteková; Zuzana Paňková; Monika Škáchová	112.22	Great Britain; Kimberley Woods; Mallory Franklin; Sophie Ogilvie	116.51	France; Marjorie Delassus; Lucie Prioux; Angèle Hug	122.58

==== Kayak ====
Event	Gold		Silver		Bronze	
K1	Corinna Kuhnle; Austria	91.42	Eva Terčelj; Slovenia	91.89	Ricarda Funk; Germany	95.34
K1 team	Great Britain; Kimberley Woods; Fiona Pennie; Mallory Franklin	105.79	Austria; Corinna Kuhnle; Antonia Oschmautz; Viktoria Wolffhardt	107.98	Czech Republic; Kateřina Minařík Kudějová; Veronika Vojtová; Antonie Galušková	111.60
Extreme Canoe Slalom	Kateřina Minařík Kudějová; Czech Republic		Corinna Kuhnle; Austria		Veronika Vojtová; Czech Republic	
