= 2010 European Junior and U23 Canoe Slalom Championships =

- Location: Markkleeberg, Germany

The 2010 European Junior and U23 Canoe Slalom Championships took place in Markkleeberg, Germany from 4 to 8 August 2010 under the auspices of the European Canoe Association (ECA) at the Kanupark Markkleeberg artificial course. It was the 12th edition of the competition for Juniors (U18) and the 8th edition for the Under 23 category. A total of 17 medal events took place. No medals were awarded for the U23 women's C1 individual and team events due to low number of participating countries. The junior women's C1 team event did not take place. It was the first time that women's C1 class appeared at the European Junior and U23 Championships.

== Medal summary ==
=== Men ===
==== Canoe ====
===== Junior =====
Event	Gold		Silver		Bronze	
C1	Kacper Gondek (POL)	101.74	Kirill Setkin (RUS)	101.81	Kilian Foulon (FRA)	103.01
C1 team	Germany; Sebastian Tilgner; Frederick Pfeiffer; Maceo Mahne	115.72	Poland; Kacper Gondek; Wojciech Pasiut; Igor Sztuba	116.55	Czech Republic; Martin Říha; Radim Božek; Michal Pešek	121.19
C2	Michał Wiercioch/Grzegorz Majerczak (POL)	114.60	Jan Michael Müller/Marcel Prinz (GER)	116.70	Jakub Hojda/Tomáš Macášek (CZE)	118.93
C2 team	Poland; Filip Brzeziński/Andrzej Brzeziński; Michał Wiercioch/Grzegorz Majerczak; Przemysław Plewa/Tomasz Kucia	143.19	Great Britain; Ryan Westley/George Tatchell; Matthew Holliday/Matthew Evans; Jonathan Shaw/Liam Allwood	145.01	Germany; Michel Kerstan/Ansgar Oltmanns; Tom Lorke/Max Gerth; Jan Michael Müller/Marcel Prinz	150.68

===== U23 =====
Event	Gold		Silver		Bronze	
C1	Denis Gargaud Chanut (FRA)	93.35	Matej Beňuš (SVK)	94.44	Christos Tsakmakis (GRE)	96.44
C1 team	Germany; Alexander Funk; Franz Anton; Sideris Tasiadis	109.59	Slovenia; Benjamin Savšek; Jure Lenarčič; Anže Berčič	112.28	Slovakia; Matej Beňuš; Karol Rozmuš; Jerguš Baďura	113.81
C2	Pierre Picco/Hugo Biso (FRA)	104.55	Gauthier Klauss/Matthieu Péché (FRA)	104.95	Ondřej Karlovský/Jakub Jáně (CZE)	105.76
C2 team	Germany; Holger Gerdes/Jan-Phillip Eckert; Robert Behling/Thomas Becker; Kai Müller/Kevin Müller	121.35	Czech Republic; Jonáš Kašpar/Marek Šindler; Robert Gotvald/Jan Vlček; Ondřej Karlovský/Jakub Jáně	126.24	Poland; Dariusz Chlebek/Patryk Brzeziński; Kamil Gondek/Andrzej Poparda; Karol Kasprzak/Marcin Kasprzak	132.49

==== Kayak ====
===== Junior =====
Event	Gold		Silver		Bronze	
K1	Jiří Prskavec (CZE)	91.96	Fabian Schweikert (GER)	97.15	Rafał Polaczyk (POL)	98.30
K1 team	Czech Republic; Jiří Prskavec; Ondřej Cvikl; Jaroslav Strnad	110.75	Great Britain; Joe Clarke; Ciaran Lee Edwards; David Bain	115.02	Italy; Lorenzo Veronesi; Zeno Ivaldi; Giovanni De Gennaro	116.10

===== U23 =====
Event	Gold		Silver		Bronze	
K1	Sebastian Schubert (GER)	90.40	Hannes Aigner (GER)	90.49	Vivien Colober (FRA)	90.67
K1 team	France; Étienne Daille; Vivien Colober; Sébastien Combot	105.59	Poland; Michał Pasiut; Mateusz Polaczyk; Łukasz Polaczyk	106.61	Italy; Riccardo De Gennaro; Lukas Mayr; Omar Raiba	107.52

=== Women ===
==== Canoe ====
===== Junior =====
Event	Gold		Silver		Bronze	
C1	Viktoria Wolffhardt (AUT)	167.60	Mallory Franklin (GBR)	173.39	Jessica Decker (GER)	215.21

===== U23 =====
Event	Gold		Silver		Bronze	
C1 (non-medal event)	Michaela Grimm (GER)	182.13	Claire Jacquet (FRA)	182.40	Sabrina Barm (GER)	220.12
C1 team (non-medal event)	France; Claire Jacquet; Cécile Tixier; Clara Dos Santos	205.95	Germany; Hannah Grünbeck; Jessica Decker; Tammy Behrendt	515.77	Germany; Sabrina Barm; Lena Stöcklin; Michaela Grimm	585.71

==== Kayak ====
===== Junior =====
Event	Gold		Silver		Bronze	
K1	Maria Clara Giai Pron (ITA)	109.84	Pavlína Zástěrová (CZE)	111.71	Eva Terčelj (SLO)	112.59
K1 team	Germany; Lisa Fritsche; Caroline Trompeter; Ricarda Funk	129.17	Great Britain; Natalie Wilson; Emily Woodcock; Bethan Latham	130.12	Czech Republic; Karolína Galušková; Anna Bustová; Pavlína Zástěrová	180.68

===== U23 =====
Event	Gold		Silver		Bronze	
K1	Jacqueline Horn (GER)	102.79	Kateřina Kudějová (CZE)	104.80	Corinna Kuhnle (AUT)	106.94
K1 team	Slovenia; Urša Kragelj; Nina Slapšak; Eva Terčelj	125.57	Germany; Stefanie Horn; Cindy Pöschel; Jacqueline Horn	129.36	Austria; Corinna Kuhnle; Viktoria Wolffhardt; Lisa Leitner	130.99

== Medal table ==
Rank	Nation	Gold	Silver	Bronze	Total
1	Germany (GER)	6	4	2	12
2	Poland (POL)	3	2	2	7
3	France (FRA)	3	1	2	6
4	Czech Republic (CZE)	2	3	4	9
5	Slovenia (SLO)	1	1	1	3
6	Austria (AUT)	1	0	2	3
6	Italy (ITA)	1	0	2	3
8	Great Britain (GBR)	0	4	0	4
9	Slovakia (SVK)	0	1	1	2
10	Russia (RUS)	0	1	0	1
11	Greece (GRE)	0	0	1	1
Totals (11 entries)		17	17	17	51
