= Anže Berčič =

Slovenian canoeist (born 1990)

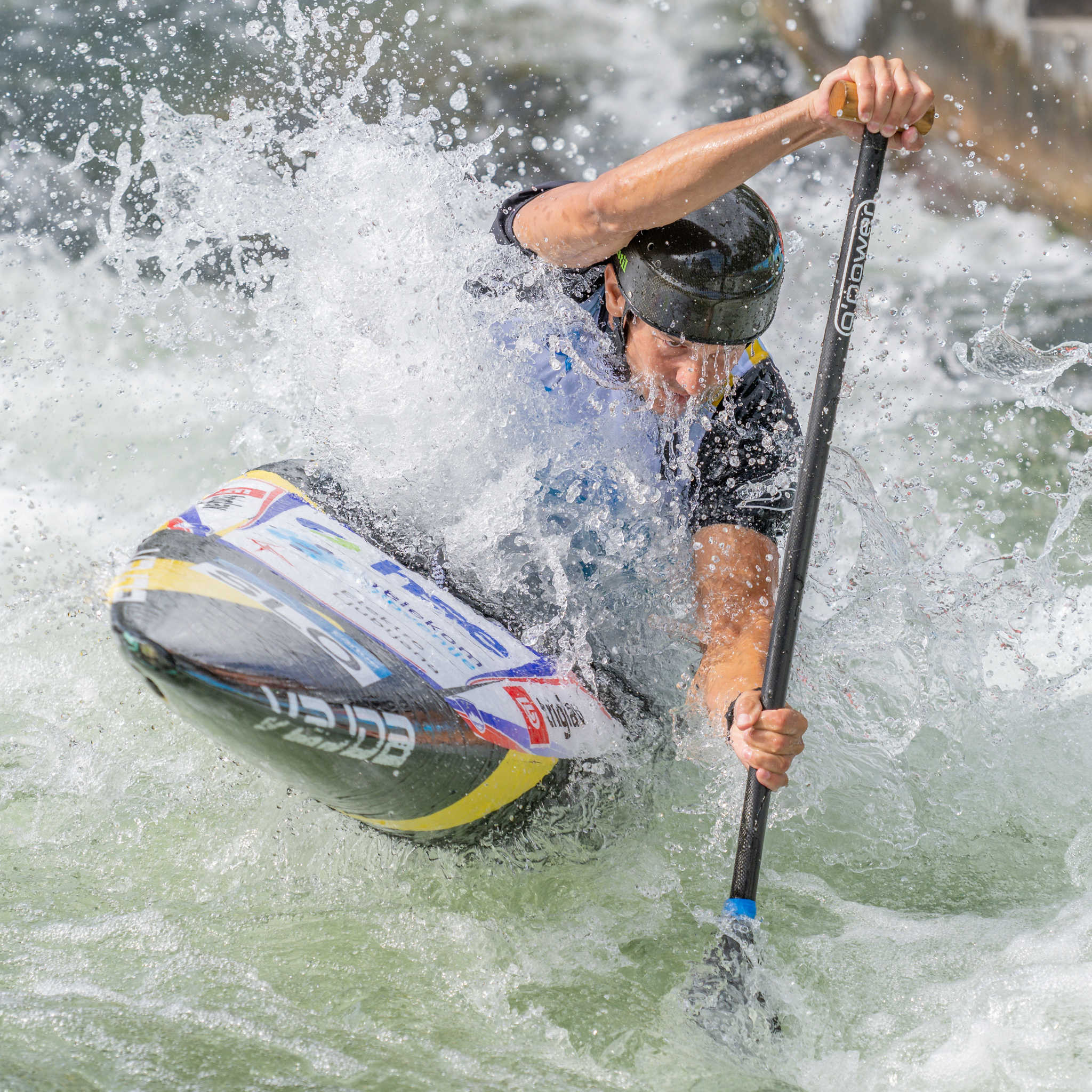
- Anže Berčič performing at 2022 ICF Canoe Slalom World Championships in Augsburg, Germany

Personal information
- Nationality: Slovenian
- Born: 10 May 1990 (age 36) Kranj, Slovenia
- Height: 1.78 m (5 ft 10 in)
- Weight: 67 kg (148 lb)

Sport
- Country: Slovenia
- Sport: Canoe slalom
- Event: C1
- Club: KKK Tacen
Medal record
Men's canoe slalom
Representing Slovenia
World Championships
| Gold medal – first place | 2022 Augsburg | C1 team |
| Silver medal – second place | 2018 Rio de Janeiro | C1 team |
| Bronze medal – third place | 2014 Deep Creek Lake | C1 team |
European Championships
| Gold medal – first place | 2014 Vienna | C1 team |
| Gold medal – first place | 2019 Pau | C1 team |
| Silver medal – second place | 2017 Tacen | C1 team |
| Bronze medal – third place | 2013 Kraków | C1 team |
U23 World Championships
| Gold medal – first place | 2012 Wausau | C1 team |
| Gold medal – first place | 2013 Liptovský Mikuláš | C1 team |
| Bronze medal – third place | 2012 Wausau | C1 |
U23 European Championships
| Gold medal – first place | 2009 Liptovský Mikuláš | C1 team |
| Gold medal – first place | 2011 Banja Luka | C1 |
| Gold medal – first place | 2012 Solkan | C1 team |
| Silver medal – second place | 2010 Markkleeberg | C1 team |
| Silver medal – second place | 2013 Bourg-Saint-Maurice | C1 |
Junior World Championships
| Gold medal – first place | 2008 Roudnice nad Labem | C1 team |
Junior European Championships
| Silver medal – second place | 2008 Solkan | C1 team |
| Bronze medal – third place | 2008 Solkan | C1 |

Anže Berčič (born 25 November 1990) is a Slovenian slalom canoeist who has competed at the international level since 2008.

He won three medals in the C1 team event at the ICF Canoe Slalom World Championships with a gold in 2022, a silver in 2018 and a bronze in 2014. He also won two golds, a silver and a bronze in the same event at the European Championships.

== World Cup individual podiums ==
| Season | Date | Venue | Position | Event |
|---|---|---|---|---|
| 2012 | 1 September 2012 | Bratislava | 2nd | C1 |
| 2013 | 6 July 2013 | La Seu d'Urgell | 1st | C1 |
| 2013 | 17 August 2013 | Tacen | 1st | C1 |
| 2019 | 29 June 2019 | Tacen | 2nd | C1 |
