= Caroline Loir =

French slalom canoeist (born 1988)

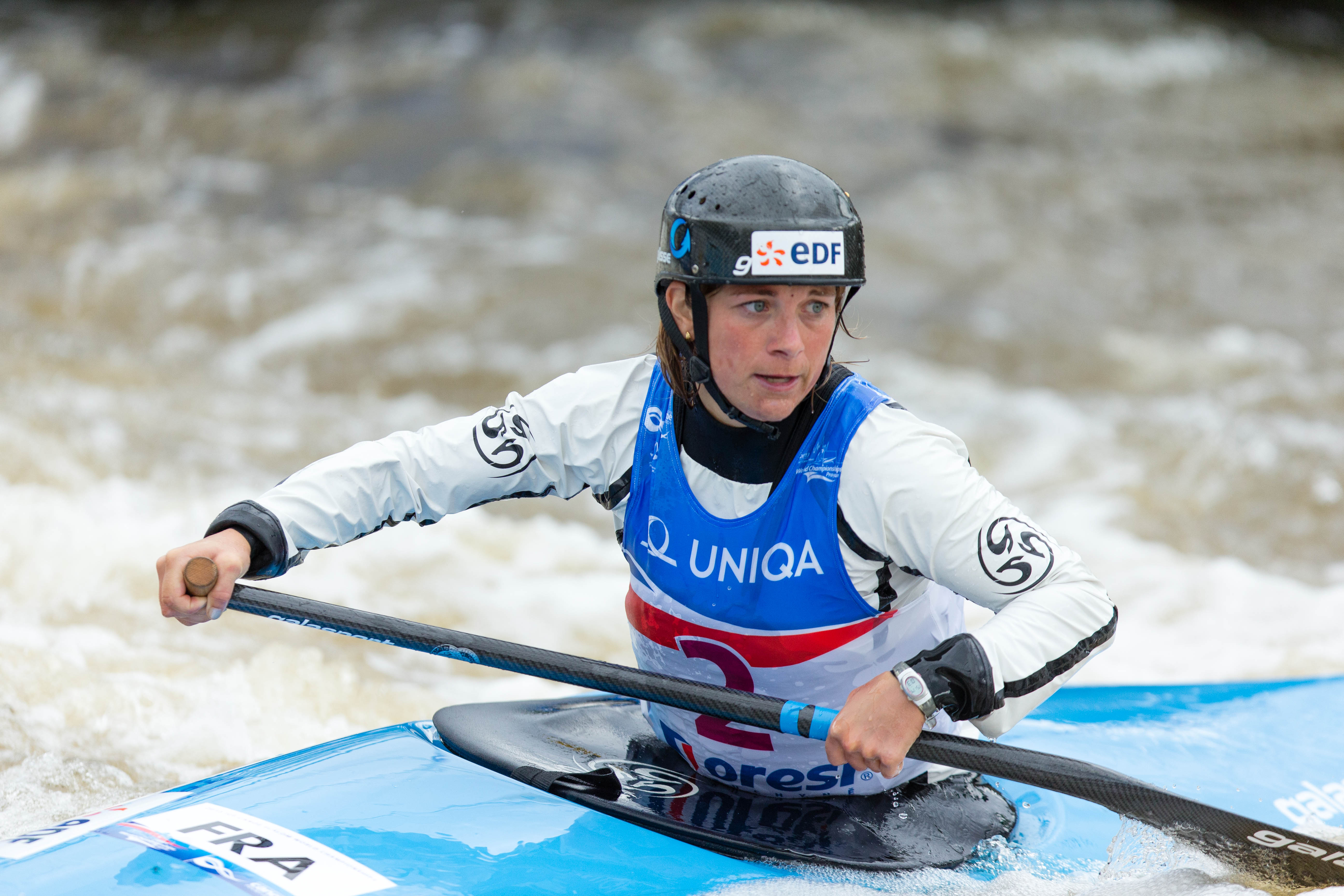

Personal information
- Born: 20 January 1988 (age 38) Amiens, France
Medal record
Women's canoe slalom
Representing France
World Championships
Bronze medal – third place	2013 Prague	C1
European Championships
Gold medal – first place	2011 La Seu d'Urgell	C1
Gold medal – first place	2013 Kraków	C1
Gold medal – first place	2014 Vienna	C1
Silver medal – second place	2012 Augsburg	K1 team
Bronze medal – third place	2010 Bratislava	C1
U23 European Championships
Silver medal – second place	2009 Liptovský Mikuláš	K1 team
Junior World Championships
Bronze medal – third place	2006 Solkan	K1 team

Caroline Loir (born 20 January 1988 in Amiens) is a French slalom canoeist who has competed at the international level since 2006.

She won a bronze medal in the C1 event at the 2013 ICF Canoe Slalom World Championships in Prague. She also won three golds, one silver and one bronze at the European Canoe Slalom Championships.

== World Cup individual podiums ==
Season	Date	Venue	Position	Event
2011	9 Jul 2011	Markkleeberg	2nd	C1
2011	13 Aug 2011	Prague	3rd	C1
2012	16 Jun 2012	Pau	1st	C1
2012	23 Jun 2012	La Seu d'Urgell	1st	C1
2012	25 Aug 2012	Prague	1st	C1
2013	6 Jul 2013	La Seu d'Urgell	2nd	C1
