= Matthieu Péché =

French canoeist

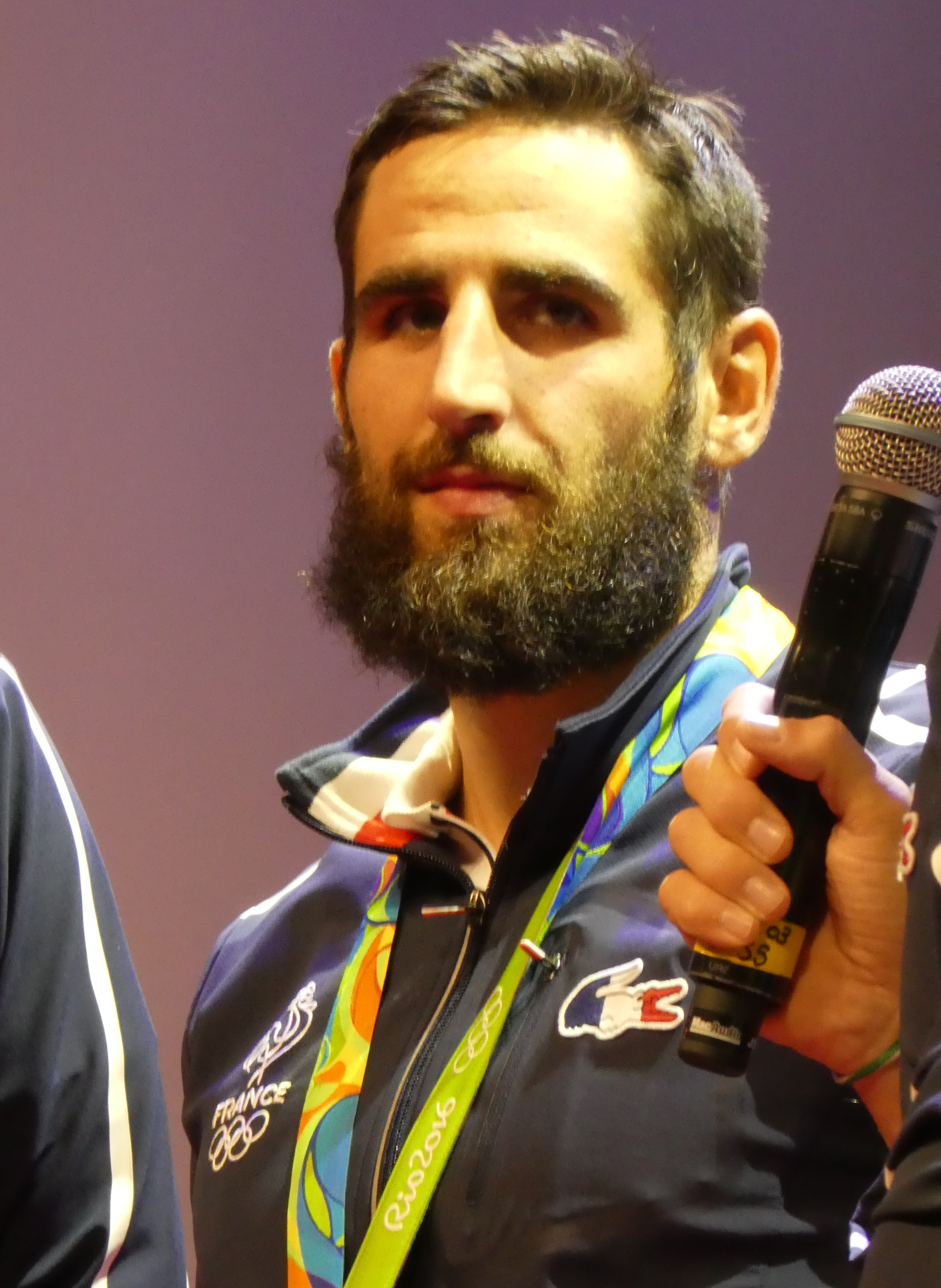
- Péché at the 2016 Summer Olympics

Personal information
- Full name: Matthieu Patrick François Péché
- Born: 7 October 1987 (age 39) Épinal, France
- Height: 175 cm (5 ft 9 in)
- Weight: 75 kg (165 lb)

Sport
- Club: GESN
- Coached by: Thierry Saidi
Medal record
Men's canoe slalom
Representing France
Olympic Games
Bronze medal – third place	2016 Rio de Janeiro	C2
World Championships
Gold medal – first place	2010 Tacen	C2 team
Gold medal – first place	2011 Bratislava	C2 team
Gold medal – first place	2014 Deep Creek Lake	C2 team
Gold medal – first place	2015 London	C2 team
Gold medal – first place	2017 Pau	C2
Bronze medal – third place	2015 London	C2
European Championships
Gold medal – first place	2013 Kraków	C2 team
Gold medal – first place	2017 Tacen	C2 team
Silver medal – second place	2014 Vienna	C2 team
Bronze medal – third place	2018 Prague	C2 team
U23 European Championships
Gold medal – first place	2007 Kraków	C2
Gold medal – first place	2008 Solkan	C2
Silver medal – second place	2010 Markkleeberg	C2
Bronze medal – third place	2007 Kraków	C2 team
Junior European Championships
Gold medal – first place	2004 Kraków	C2
Gold medal – first place	2005 Kraków	C2
Silver medal – second place	2003 Hohenlimburg	C2 team

Matthieu Patrick François Péché (born 7 October 1987, in Épinal) is a former French slalom canoeist who competed at the international level from 2003 to 2018, when the C2 category was removed from major events.

He won a bronze medal in the C2 event at the 2016 Summer Olympics in Rio de Janeiro. He also competed at the 2012 Summer Olympics in London where he finished in 4th place in the C2 event.

He won six medals at the ICF Canoe Slalom World Championships with five golds (C2: 2017, C2 team: 2010, 2011, 2014, 2015) and a bronze (C2: 2015). He also won two golds, a silver and a bronze in the C2 team event at the European Championships.

Péché won the overall world cup title in the C2 category in 2013 and 2015.

His partner in the C2 boat throughout the whole of his career was Gauthier Klauss.

He managed Team Vitality's Counter-Strike team from 2019 to 2024.

== World Cup individual podiums ==
	1st place, gold medalist(s)	2nd place, silver medalist(s)	3rd place, bronze medalist(s)	Total
C2	7	4	4	15

Season	Date	Venue	Position	Event
2011	3 July 2011	L'Argentière-la-Bessée	1st	C2
2012	26 August 2012	Prague	2nd	C2
2013	30 June 2013	Augsburg	1st	C2
2013	7 July 2013	La Seu d'Urgell	1st	C2
2013	18 August 2013	Tacen	1st	C2
2013	25 August 2013	Bratislava	3rd	C2
2014	17 August 2014	Augsburg	1st	C2
2015	21 June 2015	Prague	1st	C2
2015	5 July 2015	Liptovský Mikuláš	2nd	C2
2015	9 August 2015	La Seu d'Urgell	1st	C2
2015	16 August 2015	Pau	2nd	C2
2017	17 June 2017	Prague	2nd	C2
2017	24 June 2017	Augsburg	3rd	C2
2017	2 September 2017	Ivrea	3rd	C2
2017	9 September 2017	La Seu d'Urgell	3rd	C2
