= 2008 European Junior and U23 Canoe Slalom Championships =

- Location: Solkan, Slovenia

The 2008 European Junior and U23 Canoe Slalom Championships took place in Solkan, Slovenia from 10 to 13 July 2008 under the auspices of the European Canoe Association (ECA). It was the 10th edition of the competition for Juniors (U18) and the 6th edition for the Under 23 category. A total of 15 medal events took place. No medals were awarded for the U23 men's C2 team event due to low number of participating countries.

== Medal summary ==
=== Men ===
==== Canoe ====
===== Junior =====
| Event | Gold | | Silver | | Bronze | |
|---|---|---|---|---|---|---|
| C1 | Sideris Tasiadis (GER) | 211.16 | Jernej Zupan (SLO) | 219.17 | Anže Berčič (SLO) | 231.37 |
| C1 team | Germany; Sideris Tasiadis; Christian Scholz; Alexander Funk | 226.18 | Slovenia; Jure Lenarčič; Jernej Zupan; Anže Berčič | 229.20 | Czech Republic; Martin Říha; Jiří Herink; František Jordán | 241.87 |
| C2 | Andrzej Poparda/Kamil Gondek (POL) | 238.35 | Ondřej Karlovský/Jakub Jáně (CZE) | 244.78 | Robert Gotvald/Jan Vlček (CZE) | 245.03 |
| C2 team | Czech Republic; Ondřej Karlovský/Jakub Jáně; Robert Gotvald/Jan Vlček; Jonáš Kašpar/Marek Šindler | 242.81 | Germany; Robert Behling/Thomas Becker; Holger Gerdes/Jan-Phillip Eckert; Simon Auerbach/Florian Schubert | 251.72 | Poland; Andrzej Poparda/Kamil Gondek; Patryk Brzeziński/Dariusz Chlebek; Wojciech Pasiut/Kacper Gondek | 261.16 |

===== U23 =====
| Event | Gold | | Silver | | Bronze | |
|---|---|---|---|---|---|---|
| C1 | Christos Tsakmakis (GRE) | 208.84 | Matej Beňuš (SVK) | 209.99 | Benjamin Savšek (SLO) | 215.44 |
| C1 team | Poland; Dawid Bartos; Grzegorz Hedwig; Piotr Szczepański | 220.76 | Czech Republic; Petr Karásek; Pavel Foukal; Jan Busta | 221.29 | France; Denis Gargaud Chanut; Jonathan Marc; Edern Le Ruyet | 221.30 |
| C2 | Gauthier Klauss/Matthieu Péché (FRA) | 226.50 | Luka Božič/Sašo Taljat (SLO) | 228.20 | Tomáš Kučera/Ján Bátik (SVK) | 232.16 |
| C2 team (non-medal event) | Germany; Kai Müller/Kevin Müller; Daniel Junker/Martin Krenzer; Mirko Arold/Maik Wiedemann | 236.81 | Czech Republic; Martin Hammer/Ladislav Vlček; Jan Zdráhal/Petr Zdráhal; Tomáš Koplík/Jakub Vrzáň | 239.81 | Slovenia; Luka Slapšak/Blaž Oven; Nejc Višnar/Urban Jarc; Luka Božič/Sašo Taljat | 246.29 |

==== Kayak ====
===== Junior =====
| Event | Gold | | Silver | | Bronze | |
|---|---|---|---|---|---|---|
| K1 | Pavel Eigel (RUS) | 203.84 | Thomas Brady (GBR) | 204.05 | Ondřej Tunka (CZE) | 209.23 |
| K1 team | Poland; Michał Pasiut; Chrystian Półchłopek; Rafał Polaczyk | 213.34 | Czech Republic; Jiří Dupal; Ondřej Zajíc; Ondřej Tunka | 216.91 | Great Britain; Thomas Brady; Zachary Franklin; Toby Jones | 220.72 |

===== U23 =====
| Event | Gold | | Silver | | Bronze | |
|---|---|---|---|---|---|---|
| K1 | Andrea Romeo (ITA) | 196.75 | Grzegorz Polaczyk (POL) | 197.36 | Samuel Hernanz (ESP) | 198.10 |
| K1 team | France; Pierre Bourliaud; Sébastien Combot; Raphaël Reveche | 201.84 | Italy; Lukas Mayr; Riccardo De Gennaro; Andrea Romeo | 206.46 | Poland; Grzegorz Polaczyk; Mateusz Polaczyk; Łukasz Polaczyk | 207.28 |

=== Women ===
==== Kayak ====
===== Junior =====
| Event | Gold | | Silver | | Bronze | |
|---|---|---|---|---|---|---|
| K1 | Kateřina Kudějová (CZE) | 234.77 | Eva Terčelj (SLO) | 240.66 | Stefanie Horn (GER) | 242.09 |
| K1 team | Germany; Ricarda Funk; Stefanie Horn; Anne Rosentreter | 253.09 | Slovenia; Nina Slapšak; Dora Domajnko; Eva Terčelj | 266.79 | Great Britain; Claire Kimberley; Emily Woodcock; Bethan Latham | 280.47 |

===== U23 =====
| Event | Gold | | Silver | | Bronze | |
|---|---|---|---|---|---|---|
| K1 | Melanie Pfeifer (GER) | 219.41 | Urša Kragelj (SLO) | 226.67 | Corinna Kuhnle (AUT) | 228.37 |
| K1 team | Germany; Melanie Pfeifer; Katja Frauenrath; Jacqueline Horn | 231.20 | Russia; Ekaterina Perova; Ekaterina Klimanova; Ulyana Slotina | 252.36 | Poland; Natalia Pacierpnik; Małgorzata Milczarek; Anna Ingier | 254.05 |

== Medal table ==
| Rank | Nation | Gold | Silver | Bronze | Total |
|---|---|---|---|---|---|
| 1 | Germany (GER) | 5 | 1 | 1 | 7 |
| 2 | Poland (POL) | 3 | 1 | 3 | 7 |
| 3 | Czech Republic (CZE) | 2 | 3 | 3 | 8 |
| 4 | France (FRA) | 2 | 0 | 1 | 3 |
| 5 | Italy (ITA) | 1 | 1 | 0 | 2 |
| 5 | Russia (RUS) | 1 | 1 | 0 | 2 |
| 7 | Greece (GRE) | 1 | 0 | 0 | 1 |
| 8 | Slovenia (SLO) | 0 | 6 | 2 | 8 |
| 9 | Great Britain (GBR) | 0 | 1 | 2 | 3 |
| 10 | Slovakia (SVK) | 0 | 1 | 1 | 2 |
| 11 | Austria (AUT) | 0 | 0 | 1 | 1 |
| 11 | Spain (ESP) | 0 | 0 | 1 | 1 |
| Totals (12 entries) | | 15 | 15 | 15 | 45 |
