= Corinna Kuhnle =

Austrian slalom canoeist

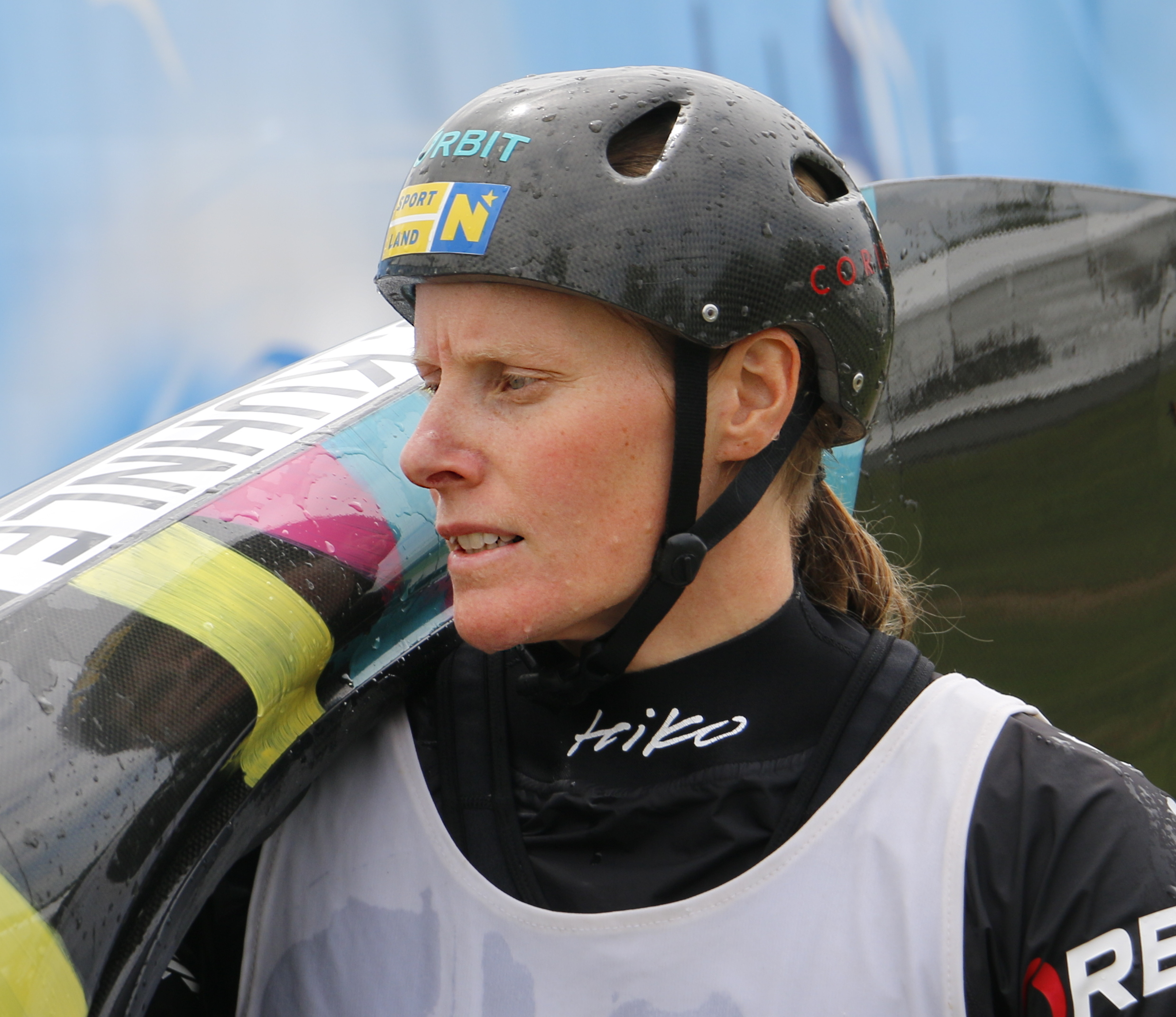
- Corinna Kuhnle (2024)

Personal information
- Nationality: Austrian
- Born: 4 July 1987 (age 39) Vienna

Sport
- Country: Austria
- Sport: Canoe slalom
- Event: K1, Kayak cross
Medal record
Women's canoe slalom
Representing Austria
World Championships
Gold medal – first place	2010 Tacen	K1
Gold medal – first place	2011 Bratislava	K1
Silver medal – second place	2014 Deep Creek Lake	K1 team
Silver medal – second place	2017 Pau	K1 team
Bronze medal – third place	2005 Penrith	K1 team
European Championships
Gold medal – first place	2017 Tacen	K1
Gold medal – first place	2021 Ivrea	K1
Silver medal – second place	2010 Bratislava	K1
Silver medal – second place	2011 La Seu d'Urgell	K1 team
Silver medal – second place	2018 Prague	K1
Silver medal – second place	2018 Prague	K1 team
Silver medal – second place	2021 Ivrea	K1 team
Silver medal – second place	2021 Ivrea	Kayak cross
Bronze medal – third place	2005 Tacen	K1 team
Bronze medal – third place	2019 Pau	K1 team
Bronze medal – third place	2020 Prague	K1 team
U23 European Championships
Bronze medal – third place	2008 Solkan	K1
Bronze medal – third place	2010 Markkleeberg	K1
Bronze medal – third place	2010 Markkleeberg	K1 team
Junior European Championships
Silver medal – second place	2004 Kraków	K1

Corinna Kuhnle (born 4 July 1987 in Vienna) is a former Austrian slalom canoeist who competed at the international level from 2002 to 2024. She is a three-time Olympian and two-time World Champion in K1.

== Career ==
Kuhnle won five medals at the ICF Canoe Slalom World Championships with two golds (K1: 2010, 2011), two silvers (K1 team: 2014, 2017) and a bronze (K1 team: 2005).

She also won two golds, six silvers and three bronzes at the European Championships.

Kuhnle won the overall World Cup title in the K1 category in 2014 and 2015.

Kuhnle competed at three Olympic Games. She finished 8th in the K1 event at the 2012 Summer Olympics in London. Four years later in Rio de Janeiro she finished in 5th place in the same event. She also competed at the 2024 Summer Olympics in Paris, finishing 10th in the K1 event and 33rd in kayak cross.

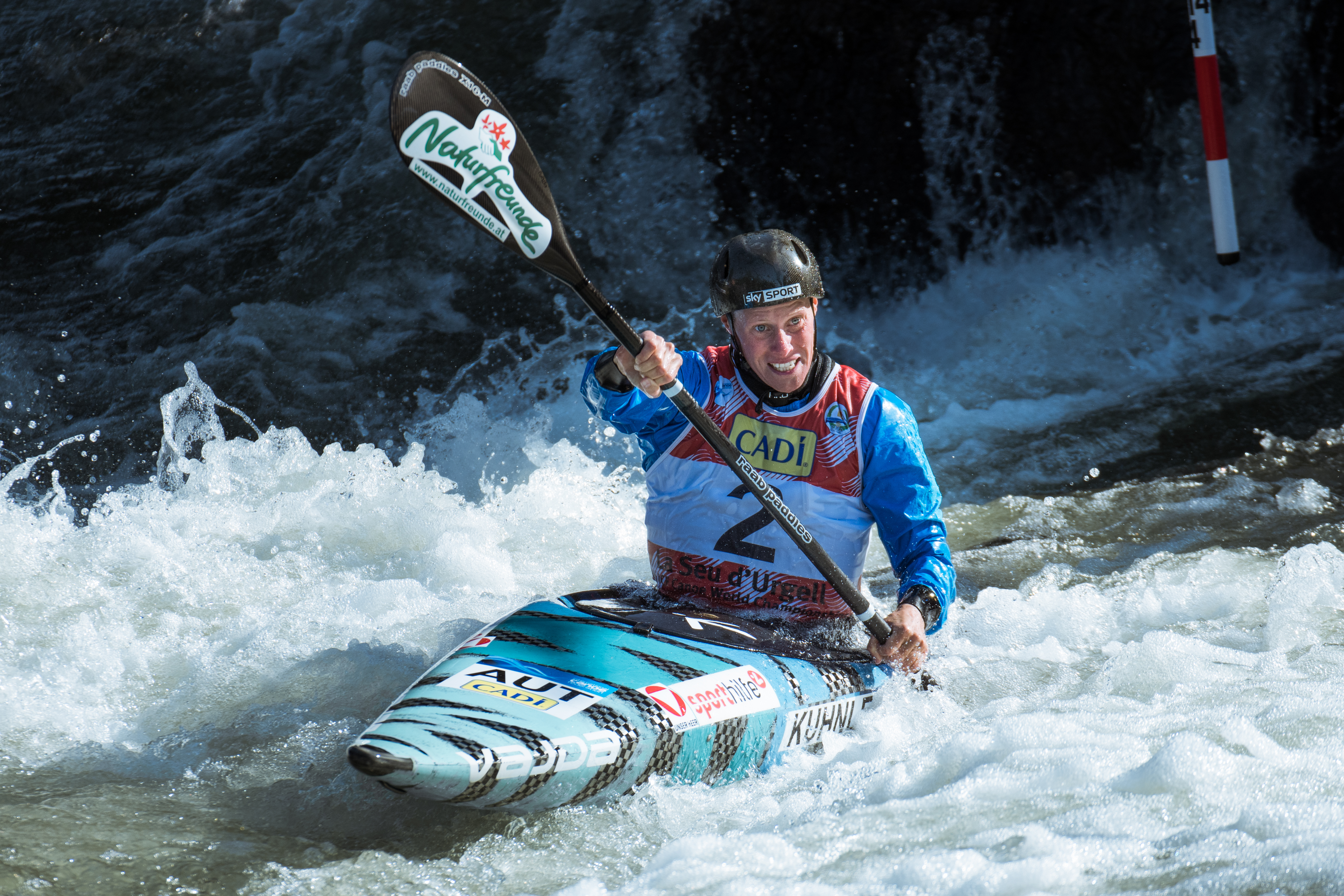
Corinna Kuhnle at the 2019 canoe slalom World Championships.

== World Cup individual podiums ==
	1st place, gold medalist(s)	2nd place, silver medalist(s)	3rd place, bronze medalist(s)	Total
K1	5	8	3	16
Kayak cross	1	1	0	2
Total	6	9	3	18

Season	Date	Venue	Position	Event
2009	3 August 2009	Kananaskis	1st	K1^{1}
2010	20 February 2010	Penrith	1st	K1^{2}
2011	10 July 2011	Markkleeberg	2nd	K1
2013	18 August 2013	Tacen	2nd	K1
2014	8 June 2014	Lee Valley	2nd	K1
2014	15 June 2014	Tacen	3rd	K1
2014	3 August 2014	La Seu d'Urgell	2nd	K1
2015	28 June 2015	Kraków	2nd	K1
2015	9 August 2015	La Seu d'Urgell	1st	K1
2015	16 August 2015	Pau	3rd	K1
2016	5 June 2016	Ivrea	3rd	K1
2016	11 September 2016	Tacen	2nd	K1
2018	23 June 2018	Liptovský Mikuláš	2nd	K1
2018	1 September 2018	Tacen	1st	K1
2019	22 June 2019	Bratislava	1st	K1
2021	13 June 2021	Prague	1st	Kayak cross
2022	26 June 2022	Tacen	2nd	Kayak cross
2023	6 October 2023	Vaires-sur-Marne	2nd	K1

^{1} Pan American Championship counting for World Cup points
^{2} Oceania Canoe Slalom Open counting for World Cup points
