= Sebastian Schubert =

German slalom canoeist (born 1988)

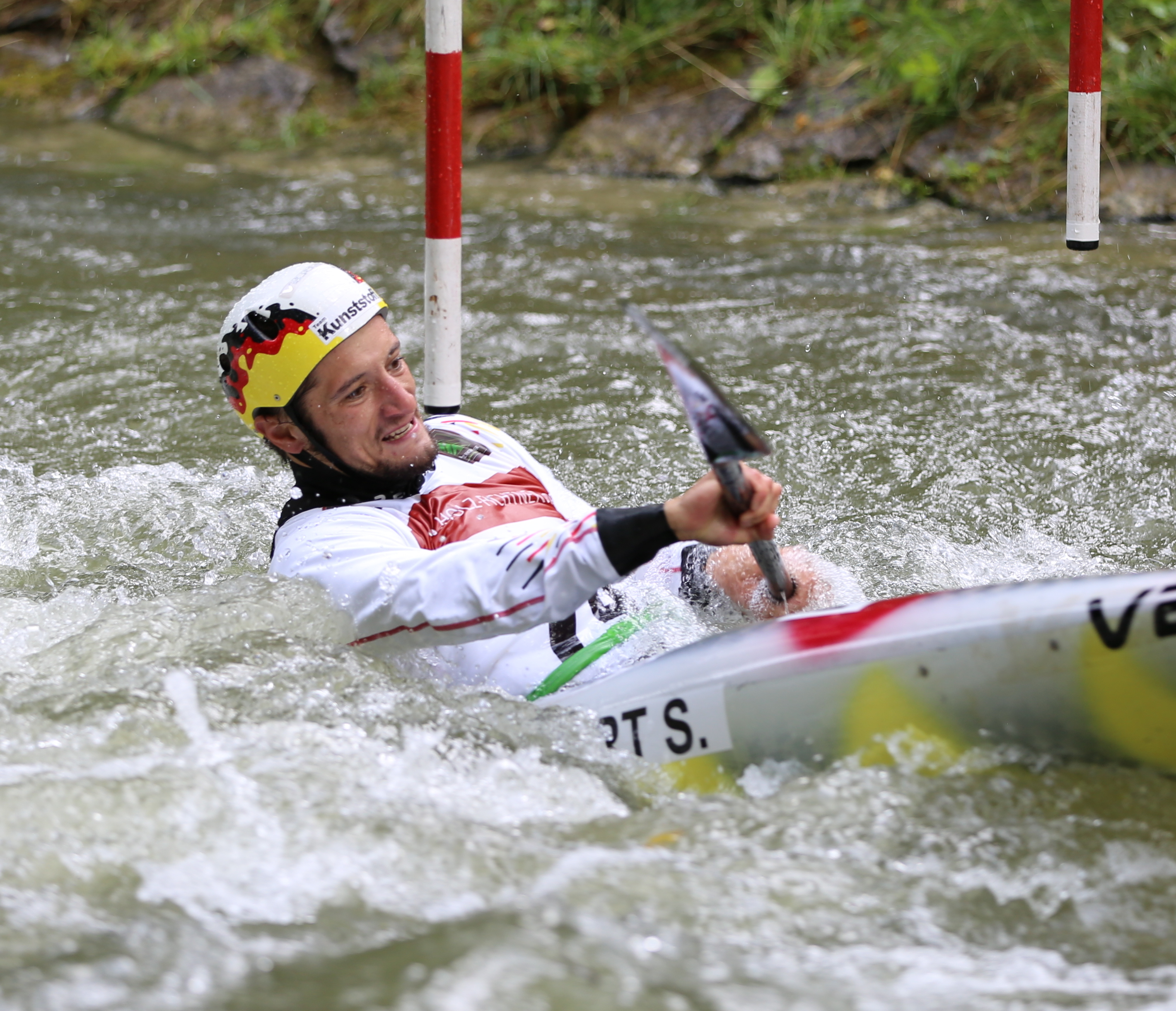
- Sebastian Schubert in 2017

Personal information
- Nationality: German
- Born: 17 July 1988 (age 37) Hamm, West Germany

Sport
- Country: Germany
- Sport: Canoe slalom
- Event: K1

Achievements and titles
- Highest world ranking: No. 1 (2014)
Medal record
Men's canoe slalom
Representing Germany
World Championships
Gold medal – first place	2011 Bratislava	K1 team
European Championships
Gold medal – first place	2014 Vienna	K1 team
Gold medal – first place	2015 Markkleeberg	K1 team
Silver medal – second place	2009 Nottingham	K1 team
Silver medal – second place	2010 Bratislava	K1 team
Silver medal – second place	2012 Augsburg	K1 team
Silver medal – second place	2013 Kraków	K1 team
Bronze medal – third place	2013 Kraków	K1
Bronze medal – third place	2019 Pau	K1 team
U23 European Championships
Gold medal – first place	2010 Markkleeberg	K1
Silver medal – second place	2007 Kraków	K1
Junior World Championships
Gold medal – first place	2006 Solkan	K1 team
Silver medal – second place	2006 Solkan	K1
Junior European Championships
Gold medal – first place	2005 Kraków	K1
Bronze medal – third place	2005 Kraków	K1 team

Sebastian Schubert (born 17 July 1988 in Hamm) is a retired German slalom canoeist who competed at the international level from 2004 to 2019.

He won a gold medal in the K1 team event at the 2011 ICF Canoe Slalom World Championships in Bratislava. He also won eight medals at the European Championships (2 golds, 4 silvers and 2 bronzes). Schubert won the overall world cup title in the K1 category in 2013 and 2014. He finished the 2014 season as the World No. 1.

== World Cup individual podiums ==
	1st place, gold medalist(s)	2nd place, silver medalist(s)	3rd place, bronze medalist(s)	Total
K1	4	3	3	10

Season	Date	Venue	Position	Event
2011	25 June 2011	Tacen	3rd	K1
2012	9 June 2012	Cardiff	1st	K1
2013	22 June 2013	Cardiff	2nd	K1
2013	29 June 2013	Augsburg	2nd	K1
2013	24 August 2013	Bratislava	1st	K1
2014	14 June 2014	Tacen	3rd	K1
2014	16 August 2014	Augsburg	1st	K1
2017	17 June 2017	Prague	3rd	K1
2017	1 July 2017	Markkleeberg	2nd	K1
2018	24 June 2018	Liptovský Mikuláš	1st	K1
