= Cindy Pöschel =

German canoeist

Medal record

Women's canoe slalom

Representing Germany

World Championships
Silver medal – second place	2013 Prague	K1 team

European Championships
Gold medal – first place	2012 Augsburg	K1 team

U23 World Championships
Silver medal – second place	2012 Wausau	K1

U23 European Championships
Gold medal – first place	2009 Liptovský Mikuláš	K1 team
Silver medal – second place	2009 Liptovský Mikuláš	K1
Silver medal – second place	2010 Markkleeberg	K1 team

Junior European Championships
Gold medal – first place	2006 Nottingham	K1 team
Gold medal – first place	2007 Kraków	K1

Cindy Pöschel (born 21 September 1989) is a German slalom canoeist who competed at the international level from 2006 to 2014.

She won a silver medal in the K1 team event at the 2013 ICF Canoe Slalom World Championships in Prague. She also won a gold medal in the same event at the 2012 European Canoe Slalom Championships in Augsburg.

== World Cup individual podiums ==
Season	Date	Venue	Position	Event
2012	10 Jun 2012	Cardiff	3rd	K1
2013	23 Jun 2013	Cardiff	3rd	K1
2013	30 Jun 2013	Augsburg	3rd	K1
