= Vavřinec Hradilek =

Czech slalom canoeist (born 1987)

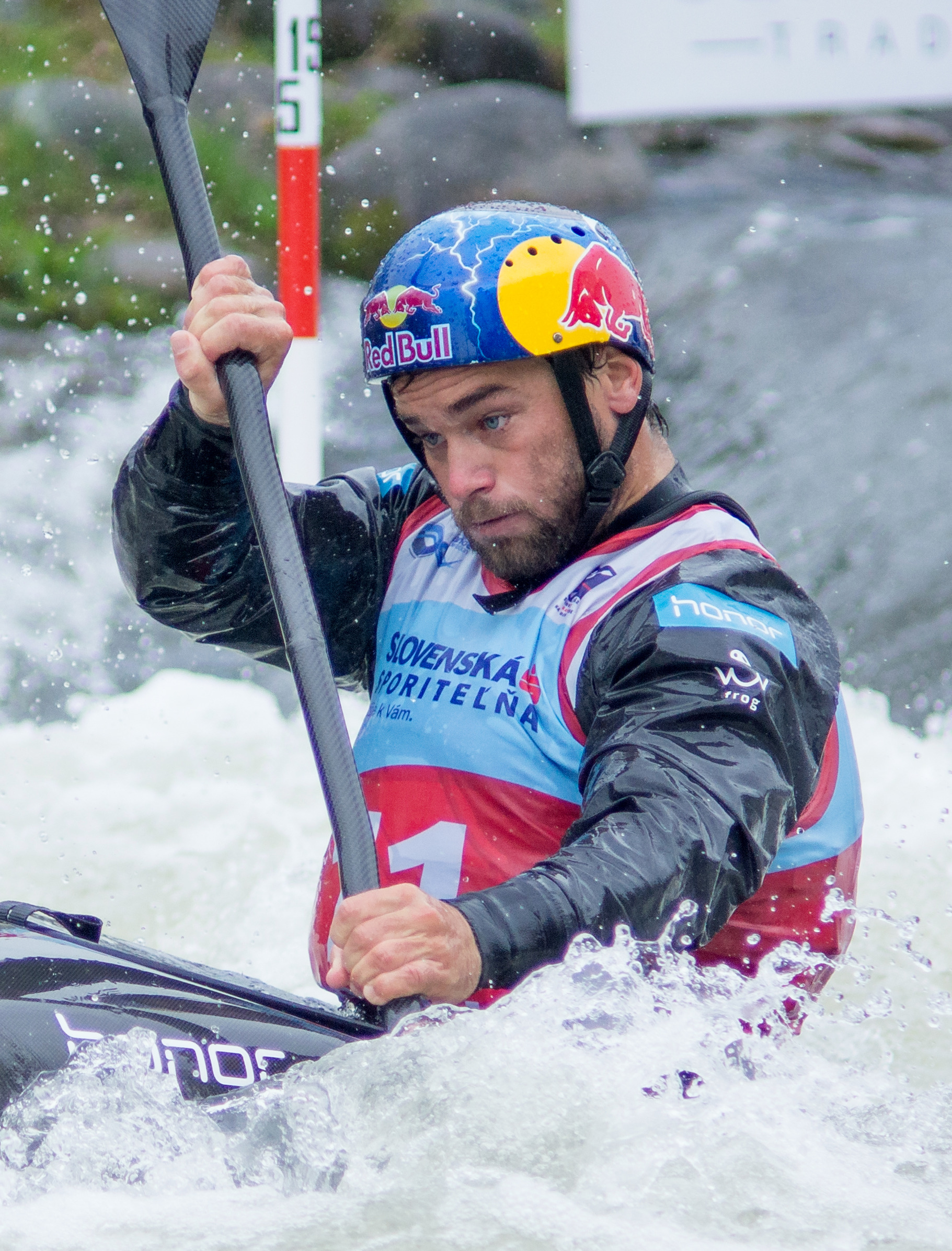
- Hradilek at the 2016 European Championships

Personal information
- Nationality: Czech
- Born: 10 March 1987 (age 39) Prague, Czechoslovakia
- Height: 169 cm (5 ft 7 in)
- Weight: 73 kg (161 lb)

Sport
- Country: Czech Republic
- Sport: Canoe slalom
- Event: K1
- Club: USK Praha
Medal record
Representing Czech Republic
Olympic Games
Silver medal – second place	2012 London	K1
World Championships
Gold medal – first place	2009 La Seu d'Urgell	K1 team
Gold medal – first place	2013 Prague	K1
Gold medal – first place	2015 London	K1 team
Gold medal – first place	2017 Pau	Extreme K1
Silver medal – second place	2010 Tacen	K1
Silver medal – second place	2014 Deep Creek Lake	K1 team
Silver medal – second place	2019 La Seu d'Urgell	K1 team
Bronze medal – third place	2007 Foz do Iguaçu	K1 team
European Championships
Gold medal – first place	2013 Kraków	K1 team
Gold medal – first place	2016 Liptovský Mikuláš	K1 team
Gold medal – first place	2019 Pau	K1 team
Gold medal – first place	2021 Ivrea	K1 team
Silver medal – second place	2016 Liptovský Mikuláš	K1
Silver medal – second place	2020 Prague	K1 team
Bronze medal – third place	2010 Bratislava	K1
U23 European Championships
Gold medal – first place	2009 Liptovský Mikuláš	K1
Bronze medal – third place	2007 Kraków	K1 team
Junior World Championships
Bronze medal – third place	2004 Lofer	K1
Bronze medal – third place	2004 Lofer	K1 team
Junior European Championships
Silver medal – second place	2003 Hohenlimburg	K1 team
Silver medal – second place	2005 Kraków	K1 team
Bronze medal – third place	2004 Kraków	K1

Vavřinec Hradilek (Czech pronunciation: [ˈvavr̝ɪnɛts ˈɦraɟɪlɛk]; born 10 March 1987) is a Czech slalom canoeist who has competed at the international level since 2003.

Hradilek competed in the 2008 Summer Olympics in Beijing. In the K1 event he finished seventh in the qualification round, thus progressing to the semifinals. In the semifinals he finished eleventh, failing to reach the final round. At the 2012 Summer Olympics in London he won a silver medal in the K1 event. He recorded a time of 94.78 seconds in the final which was only beaten by Daniele Molmenti (93.43 s). He also started in the C2 event with Stanislav Ježek where they finished ninth after being eliminated in the semifinals.

Hradilek won eight medals at the ICF Canoe Slalom World Championships with four golds (K1: 2013; K1 team: 2009, 2015; Extreme K1: 2017), three silvers (K1: 2010, K1 team: 2014, 2019) and a bronze (K1 team: 2007). He also won seven medals at the European Championships (4 golds, 2 silvers and 1 bronze).

== World Cup individual podiums ==
Season	Date	Venue	Position	Event
2007	1 Jul 2007	Prague	1st	K1
2009	1 Feb 2009	Mangahao	1st	K1^{1}
2010	21 Feb 2010	Penrith	2nd	K1^{2}
2011	13 Aug 2011	Prague	1st	K1
2013	6 Jul 2013	La Seu d'Urgell	1st	K1
2015	27 Jun 2015	Kraków	1st	K1
2015	4 Jul 2015	Liptovský Mikuláš	2nd	K1
2016	3 Sep 2016	Prague	3rd	K1
2019	23 June 2019	Bratislava	1st	Extreme K1

^{1} Oceania Championship counting for World Cup points
^{2} Oceania Canoe Slalom Open counting for World Cup points
