= 2018 European Canoe Slalom Championships =

The 2018 European Canoe Slalom Championships took place in Prague, Czech Republic under the auspices of the European Canoe Association (ECA). It was the 19th edition of the competition and Prague hosted the event for the first time. The events took place at the Prague-Troja Canoeing Centre from 1 to 3 June 2018.

The men's C2 event made its last appearance at major international competitions after the ICF had decided to pull this event out of the World Cup and World Championship program.

== Medal summary ==
=== Men ===
==== Canoe ====
Event	Gold		Silver		Bronze	
C1	Ryan Westley; Great Britain	95.48	Adam Burgess; Great Britain	97.05	Tomáš Rak; Czech Republic	97.59
C1 team	France; Denis Gargaud Chanut; Pierre-Antoine Tillard; Cédric Joly	110.04	Slovakia; Alexander Slafkovský; Michal Martikán; Marko Mirgorodský	110.99	Czech Republic; Vítězslav Gebas; Lukáš Rohan; Tomáš Rak	111.58
C2	Czech Republic; Jonáš Kašpar/Marek Šindler	107.99	Germany; Robert Behling/Thomas Becker	108.86	Czech Republic; Ondřej Karlovský/Jakub Jáně	109.09
C2 team	Germany; Robert Behling/Thomas Becker; Franz Anton/Jan Benzien; David Schröder/Nico Bettge	122.53	Czech Republic; Ondřej Karlovský/Jakub Jáně; Tomáš Koplík/Jakub Vrzáň; Jonáš Kašpar/Marek Šindler	126.64	France; Gauthier Klauss/Matthieu Péché; Nicolas Scianimanico/Hugo Cailhol; Pierre-Antoine Tillard/Denis Gargaud Chanut	133.53

==== Kayak ====
Event	Gold		Silver		Bronze	
K1	Peter Kauzer; Slovenia	91.02	Vít Přindiš; Czech Republic	91.53	Jiří Prskavec; Czech Republic	91.87
K1 team	Czech Republic; Ondřej Tunka; Vít Přindiš; Jiří Prskavec	101.79	Poland; Mateusz Polaczyk; Dariusz Popiela; Michał Pasiut	105.44	Slovenia; Peter Kauzer; Martin Srabotnik; Niko Testen	108.02

=== Women ===
==== Canoe ====
Event	Gold		Silver		Bronze	
C1	Viktoria Wolffhardt; Austria	119.01	Mallory Franklin; Great Britain	119.58	Elena Apel; Germany	122.39
C1 team	Great Britain; Mallory Franklin; Kimberley Woods; Bethan Forrow	140.75	France; Lucie Prioux; Lucie Baudu; Claire Jacquet	146.89	Spain; Núria Vilarrubla; Miren Lazkano; Klara Olazabal	152.25

==== Kayak ====
Event	Gold		Silver		Bronze	
K1	Ricarda Funk; Germany	100.96	Corinna Kuhnle; Austria	102.32	Fiona Pennie; Great Britain	102.91
K1 team	Germany; Ricarda Funk; Jasmin Schornberg; Lisa Fritsche	118.26	Austria; Corinna Kuhnle; Lisa Leitner; Viktoria Wolffhardt	120.81	Czech Republic; Kateřina Kudějová; Barbora Valíková; Veronika Vojtová	121.20

== Medal table ==
Rank	Nation	Gold	Silver	Bronze	Total
1	Germany (GER)	3	1	1	5
2	Czech Republic (CZE)	2	2	5	9
3	Great Britain (GBR)	2	2	1	5
4	Austria (AUT)	1	2	0	3
5	France (FRA)	1	1	1	3
6	Slovenia (SLO)	1	0	1	2
7	Poland (POL)	0	1	0	1
7	Slovakia (SVK)	0	1	0	1
9	Spain (ESP)	0	0	1	1
Totals (9 entries)		10	10	10	30
