= Sašo Taljat =

Slovenian slalom canoeist (born 1989)

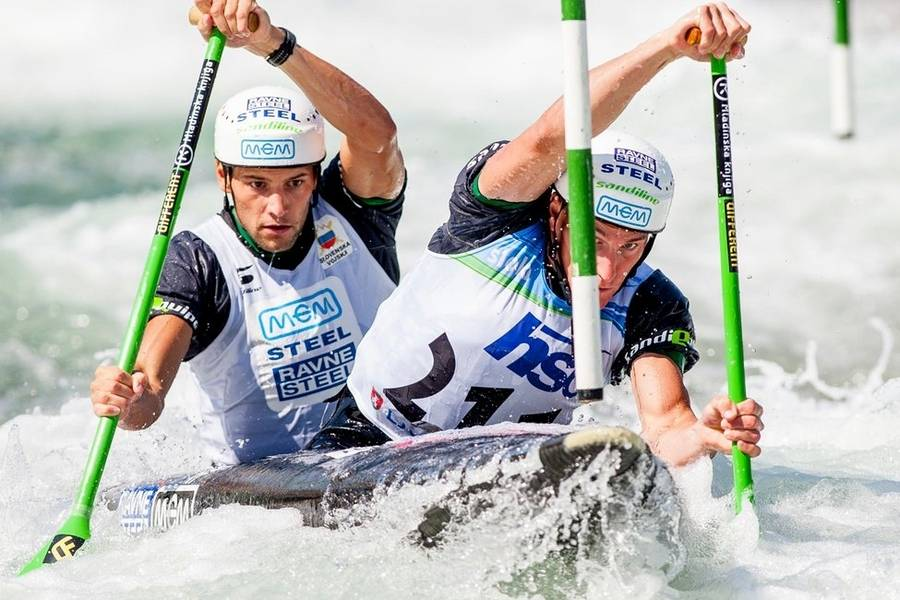

Personal information
- Born: 22 September 1989 (age 36) Šempeter pri Gorici, Yugoslavia
Medal record
Men's canoe slalom
Representing Slovenia
World Championships
Gold medal – first place	2014 Deep Creek Lake	C2
Bronze medal – third place	2009 La Seu d'Urgell	C2
European Championships
Silver medal – second place	2016 Liptovský Mikuláš	C2
Bronze medal – third place	2014 Vienna	C2
U23 European Championships
Gold medal – first place	2011 Banja Luka	C2
Gold medal – first place	2012 Solkan	C2
Silver medal – second place	2008 Solkan	C2
Silver medal – second place	2009 Liptovský Mikuláš	C2
Junior World Championships
Bronze medal – third place	2006 Solkan	C2 team
Junior European Championships
Gold medal – first place	2006 Nottingham	C2 team

Sašo Taljat (born 22 September 1989) is a retired Slovenian slalom canoeist who competed at the international level from 2006 to 2017.

He won two medals in the C2 event at the ICF Canoe Slalom World Championships with a gold in 2014 and a bronze in 2009. He also won one silver and one bronze medal in the C2 event at the European Championships.

At the 2012 Summer Olympics in London he competed in the C2 event where he finished in 8th place after being eliminated in the semifinal. Four years later in Rio de Janeiro he finished in 7th place in the same event.

His partner in the C2 boat throughout the whole of his career was Luka Božič.

== World Cup individual podiums ==
	1st place, gold medalist(s)	2nd place, silver medalist(s)	3rd place, bronze medalist(s)	Total
C2	2	3	5	10

Season	Date	Venue	Position	Event
2011	3 July 2011	L'Argentière-la-Bessée	2nd	C2
2011	14 August 2011	Prague	1st	C2
2012	10 June 2012	Cardiff	2nd	C2
2012	26 August 2012	Prague	3rd	C2
2013	23 June 2013	Cardiff	3rd	C2
2013	7 July 2013	La Seu d'Urgell	3rd	C2
2013	18 August 2013	Tacen	3rd	C2
2014	8 June 2014	Lee Valley	1st	C2
2014	15 June 2014	Tacen	2nd	C2
2014	22 June 2014	Prague	3rd	C2
