= Kateřina Minařík Kudějová =

Czech slalom canoeist (born 1990)

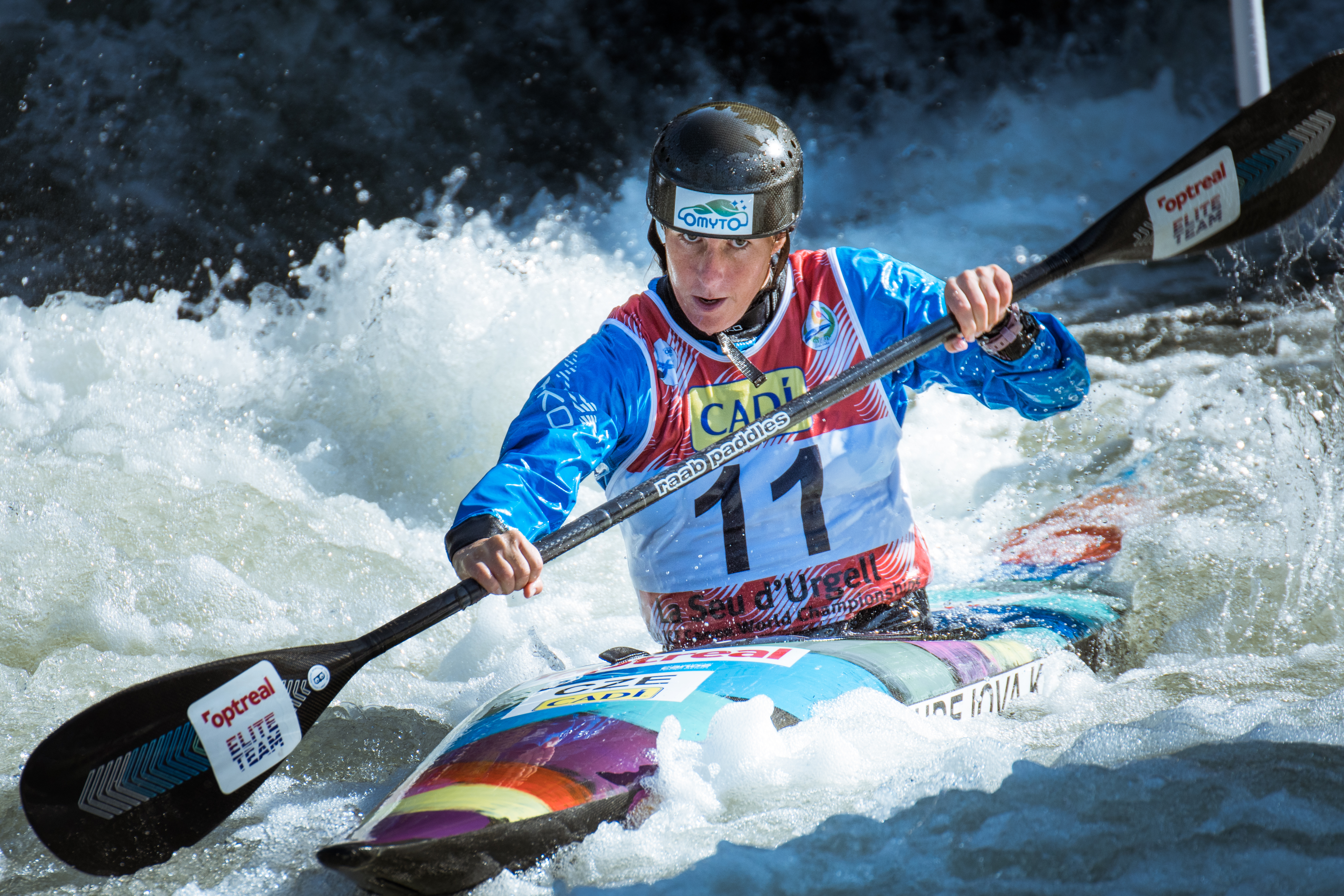
- Kudějová during the 2019 Canoe Slalom World Championships.

Personal information
- Nationality: Czech
- Born: 17 January 1990 (age 36) Prague, Czechoslovakia
- Height: 173 cm (5 ft 8 in)
- Weight: 63 kg (139 lb)

Sport
- Country: Czech Republic
- Sport: Canoe slalom
- Event: K1, Kayak cross
- Club: USK Praha
Medal record
Representing Czech Republic
World Championships
Gold medal – first place	2013 Prague	K1 team
Gold medal – first place	2015 London	K1
Gold medal – first place	2015 London	K1 team
Silver medal – second place	2011 Bratislava	K1 team
Silver medal – second place	2019 La Seu d'Urgell	K1 team
Silver medal – second place	2021 Bratislava	K1 team
European Championships
Gold medal – first place	2011 La Seu d'Urgell	K1 team
Gold medal – first place	2014 Vienna	K1 team
Gold medal – first place	2020 Prague	K1
Gold medal – first place	2020 Prague	K1 team
Gold medal – first place	2021 Ivrea	Kayak cross
Bronze medal – third place	2013 Krakow	K1 team
Bronze medal – third place	2015 Markkleeberg	K1
Bronze medal – third place	2018 Prague	K1 team
Bronze medal – third place	2021 Ivrea	K1 team
U23 World Championships
Gold medal – first place	2012 Wausau	K1
Gold medal – first place	2012 Wausau	K1 team
Gold medal – first place	2013 Liptovský Mikuláš	K1
Gold medal – first place	2013 Liptovský Mikuláš	K1 team
U23 European Championships
Gold medal – first place	2009 Liptovský Mikuláš	K1
Gold medal – first place	2011 Banja Luka	K1 team
Gold medal – first place	2013 Bourg St. Maurice	K1 team
Silver medal – second place	2010 Markkleeberg	K1
Silver medal – second place	2012 Solkan	K1
Bronze medal – third place	2009 Liptovský Mikuláš	K1 team
Bronze medal – third place	2012 Solkan	K1 team
Junior World Championships
Gold medal – first place	2008 Roudnice nad Labem	K1 team
Silver medal – second place	2006 Solkan	K1 team
Bronze medal – third place	2008 Roudnice nad Labem	K1
Junior European Championships
Gold medal – first place	2006 Nottingham	K1
Gold medal – first place	2007 Kraków	K1 team
Gold medal – first place	2008 Solkan	K1
Silver medal – second place	2006 Nottingham	K1 team
Silver medal – second place	2007 Kraków	K1

Kateřina Minařík Kudějová (Czech pronunciation: [ˈkatɛr̝ɪna ˈkuɟɛjovaː]; née Kudějová, born 17 January 1990) is a Czech slalom canoeist who has competed at the international level since 2005.

She won six medals at the ICF Canoe Slalom World Championships with three golds (K1: 2015; K1 team: 2013, 2015) and three silvers (K1 team: 2011, 2019, 2021). She also won nine medals at the European Championships (5 golds and 4 bronzes).

Minařík Kudějová participated in two Olympic Games. She finished in 10th place in the K1 event at the 2016 Summer Olympics in Rio de Janeiro and 15th in the K1 event at the 2020 Summer Olympics in Tokyo after being eliminated in the semifinal.

== World Cup individual podiums ==
Season	Date	Venue	Position	Event
2010	20 February 2010	Penrith	2nd	K1^{1}
2011	3 July 2011	L'Argentière-la-Bessée	3rd	K1
2012	24 June 2012	La Seu d'Urgell	3rd	K1
2012	2 September 2012	Bratislava	2nd	K1
2013	7 July 2013	La Seu d'Urgell	3rd	K1
2014	22 June 2014	Prague	2nd	K1
2015	21 June 2015	Prague	3rd	K1
2021	11 September 2021	Pau	2nd	K1

^{1} Oceania Canoe Slalom Open counting for World Cup points
