= 2013 European Canoe Slalom Championships =

The 2013 European Canoe Slalom Championships took place in Kraków, Poland between June 6 and 9, 2013 under the auspices of the European Canoe Association (ECA) at the Kraków-Kolna Canoe Slalom Course. It was the 14th edition and it was the second time that Kraków hosted the event after hosting it in 2008. The competitions were held over two days instead of three due to floods which forced the organizers to shorten the program. The qualification for individual events consisted of a single run instead of two and the semifinal runs were skipped. Therefore, the competitions were decided in two runs instead of four. The women's C1 team event was canceled completely.

== Medal summary ==
=== Men's results ===
==== Canoe ====
Event	Gold	Points	Silver	Points	Bronze	Points
C1	Jan Benzien (GER)	89.80	Sideris Tasiadis (GER)	91.22	Matej Beňuš (SVK)	91.57
C1 team	Slovakia; Alexander Slafkovský; Matej Beňuš; Jerguš Baďura	98.99	Germany; Franz Anton; Jan Benzien; Sideris Tasiadis	100.53	Slovenia; Benjamin Savšek; Anže Berčič; Luka Božič	103.58
C2	France; Pierre Labarelle; Nicolas Peschier	95.33	Poland; Marcin Pochwała; Piotr Szczepański	96.25	Czech Republic; Ondřej Karlovský; Jakub Jáně	97.06
C2 team	France; Gauthier Klauss & Matthieu Péché; Pierre Labarelle & Nicolas Peschier; Hugo Biso & Pierre Picco	111.50	Poland; Marcin Pochwała & Piotr Szczepański; Filip Brzeziński & Andrzej Brzeziński; Dominik Węglarz & Dariusz Chlebek	112.82	Germany; Franz Anton & Jan Benzien; Kai Müller & Kevin Müller; Eric Mendel & Alexander Funk	118.32

==== Kayak ====
Event	Gold	Points	Silver	Points	Bronze	Points
K1	Jiří Prskavec (CZE)	81.17	Michael Kurt (SUI)	81.80	Sebastian Schubert (GER)	83.62
K1 team	Czech Republic; Vavřinec Hradilek; Jiří Prskavec; Vít Přindiš	92.30	Germany; Hannes Aigner; Fabian Dörfler; Sebastian Schubert	93.01	Poland; Dariusz Popiela; Grzegorz Polaczyk; Rafał Polaczyk	94.24

=== Women's results ===
==== Canoe ====
Event	Gold	Points	Silver	Points	Bronze	Points
C1	Caroline Loir (FRA)	114.39	Julia Schmid (AUT)	114.91	Núria Vilarrubla (ESP)	123.21
C1 team	Event canceled due to bad weather	-	Event canceled due to bad weather	-	Event canceled due to bad weather	-

==== Kayak ====
Event	Gold	Points	Silver	Points	Bronze	Points
K1	Fiona Pennie (GBR)	91.54	Stefanie Horn (ITA)	95.04	Viktoria Wolffhardt (AUT)	103.48
K1 team	France; Émilie Fer; Marie-Zélia Lafont; Carole Bouzidi	108.71	Great Britain; Lizzie Neave; Fiona Pennie; Bethan Latham	116.85	Czech Republic; Štěpánka Hilgertová; Kateřina Kudějová; Eva Ornstová	121.98

== Medal table ==
Rank	Nation	Gold	Silver	Bronze	Total
1	France (FRA)	4	0	0	4
2	Czech Republic (CZE)	2	0	2	4
3	Germany (GER)	1	3	2	6
4	Great Britain (GBR)	1	1	0	2
5	Slovakia (SVK)	1	0	1	2
6	Poland (POL)	0	2	1	3
7	Austria (AUT)	0	1	1	2
8	Italy (ITA)	0	1	0	1
8	Switzerland (SUI)	0	1	0	1
10	Slovenia (SLO)	0	0	1	1
10	Spain (ESP)	0	0	1	1
Totals (11 entries)		9	9	9	27
