= Viktoria Wolffhardt =

Austrian slalom canoeist

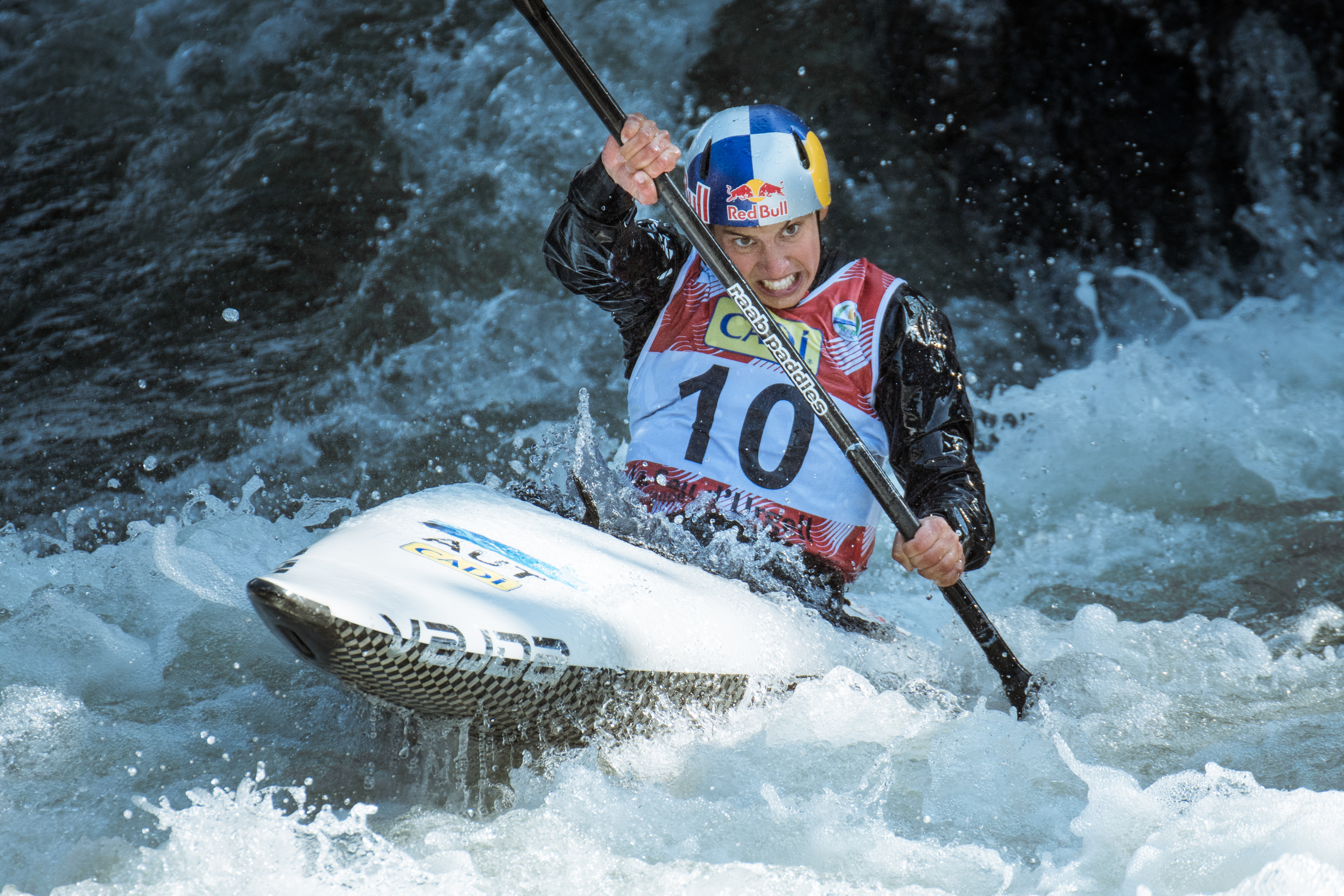
- Wolffhardt at the 2019 World Championships

Personal information
- Nationality: Austrian
- Born: 26 June 1994 (age 32) Tulln an der Donau

Sport
- Country: Austria
- Sport: Canoe slalom
- Event: C1, K1
Medal record
Women's canoe slalom
Representing Austria
World Championships
Silver medal – second place	2014 Deep Creek Lake	K1 team
Silver medal – second place	2017 Pau	K1 team
Bronze medal – third place	2015 London	C1 team
European Championships
Gold medal – first place	2018 Prague	C1
Silver medal – second place	2011 La Seu d'Urgell	K1 team
Silver medal – second place	2018 Prague	K1 team
Silver medal – second place	2021 Ivrea	K1 team
Bronze medal – third place	2013 Kraków	K1
Bronze medal – third place	2019 Pau	K1 team
Youth Olympic Games
Bronze medal – third place	2010 Singapore	K1
U23 World Championships
Gold medal – first place	2015 Foz do Iguaçu	K1 team
Silver medal – second place	2013 Liptovský Mikuláš	C1
Bronze medal – third place	2016 Kraków	C1
U23 European Championships
Gold medal – first place	2016 Solkan	K1
Gold medal – first place	2017 Hohenlimburg	K1
Silver medal – second place	2011 Banja Luka	K1 team
Silver medal – second place	2015 Kraków	K1
Silver medal – second place	2017 Hohenlimburg	C1
Bronze medal – third place	2010 Markkleeberg	K1 team
Bronze medal – third place	2015 Kraków	K1 team
Bronze medal – third place	2016 Solkan	C1
Junior World Championships
Bronze medal – third place	2012 Wausau	K1
Junior European Championships
Gold medal – first place	2010 Markkleeberg	C1
Gold medal – first place	2011 Banja Luka	C1
Bronze medal – third place	2012 Solkan	C1
Bronze medal – third place	2012 Solkan	K1

Viktoria Wolffhardt (born 26 June 1994 in Tulln an der Donau) is an Austrian slalom canoeist who has competed at the international level since 2009.

She won three medals at the ICF Canoe Slalom World Championships with two silvers (K1 team: 2014, 2017) and a bronze (C1 team: 2015). She also won a gold, three silvers and two bronzes at the European Championships.

She represented Austria at two Olympic games. At the delayed 2020 Summer Olympics in Tokyo she finished 11th in the K1 event after being eliminated in the semifinal. She also competed at the 2024 Summer Olympics in Paris, finishing 14th in the C1 event and 31st in kayak cross.

She competed at the 2010 Summer Youth Olympics where she won bronze in the K1 slalom event.

== World Cup individual podiums ==
Season	Date	Venue	Position	Event
2015	4 July 2015	Liptovský Mikuláš	2nd	C1
2015	15 August 2015	Pau	3rd	C1
2017	2 September 2017	Ivrea	2nd	C1
2018	1 September 2018	Tacen	3rd	K1
2019	30 June 2019	Tacen	2nd	C1
2022	26 June 2022	Tacen	3rd	Kayak cross
2023	2 June 2023	Augsburg	3rd	K1
