= 2015 ICF Canoe Slalom World Championships =

World championship canoeing

The 2015 ICF Canoe Slalom World Championships were the 37th edition of the ICF Canoe Slalom World Championships. The event took place from 15 to 20 September 2015 in London, United Kingdom, under the auspices of International Canoe Federation (ICF), at the Lee Valley White Water Centre facility, which was also the venue for the canoe slalom events at the 2012 Summer Olympics.

The London bid was selected by the ICF Board of Directors on April 15, 2011 in Paris. London defeated Bourg St.-Maurice in the bidding process.

The event was the only global qualification for the 2016 Summer Olympics in Rio de Janeiro.

== Schedule ==
The schedule of events. All times listed are (UTC+1).

Date	Starting Time	Events
16 September	10:30	C2 Men, K1 Women heats – 1st run
16 September	14:30	C2 Men, K1 Women heats – 2nd run
17 September	10:30	C1 Men, C1 Women heats – 1st run
17 September	15:00	C1 Men, C1 Women heats – 2nd run
18 September	10:30	K1 Men heats – 1st run
18 September	13:30	K1 Men heats – 2nd run
19 September	10:00	C2 Men, K1 Women semifinals
19 September	13:00	C2 Men, K1 Women finals
19 September	15:30	C2 Men, K1 Women teams
20 September	09:00	C1 Men, C1 Women, K1 Men semifinals
20 September	13:30	C1 Men, C1 Women, K1 Men finals
20 September	16:00	C1 Men, C1 Women, K1 Men teams

Gate map for the Heats of the World Championships, 2015 Sep 16-18

Gate map for the Semi- & Finals of the World Championships, 2015 Sep 19-20

== Medal summary ==
=== Medal table ===
* Host nation (Great Britain)

Rank	Nation	Gold	Silver	Bronze	Total
1	Czech Republic	4	2	0	6
2	Australia	2	0	0	2
3	Germany	1	3	1	5
4	Great Britain*	1	1	3	5
5	France	1	1	2	4
6	Slovakia	1	1	0	2
7	Slovenia	0	1	1	2
8	Poland	0	1	0	1
9	Austria	0	0	1	1
9	Spain	0	0	1	1
9	United States	0	0	1	1
Totals (11 entries)		10	10	10	30

=== Men ===
==== Canoe ====
Event	Gold		Silver		Bronze	
C1	David Florence (GBR)	94.32	Benjamin Savšek (SLO)	94.36	Ryan Westley (GBR)	96.33
C1 team	Slovakia; Michal Martikán; Alexander Slafkovský; Matej Beňuš	106.12	Germany; Sideris Tasiadis; Nico Bettge; Franz Anton	110.21	Slovenia; Benjamin Savšek; Luka Božič; Jure Lenarčič	114.02
C2	Germany; Franz Anton; Jan Benzien	101.17	France; Pierre Picco; Hugo Biso	102.25	France; Gauthier Klauss; Matthieu Péché	103.34
C2 team	France; Pierre Picco & Hugo Biso; Gauthier Klauss & Matthieu Péché; Yves Prigent & Loïc Kervella	115.78	Germany; Franz Anton & Jan Benzien; Robert Behling & Thomas Becker; Kai Müller & Kevin Müller	122.34	Great Britain; David Florence & Richard Hounslow; Mark Proctor & Etienne Stott; Adam Burgess & Greg Pitt	123.59

==== Kayak ====
Event	Gold		Silver		Bronze	
K1	Jiří Prskavec (CZE)	88.99	Mateusz Polaczyk (POL)	89.43	Michal Smolen (USA)	92.01
K1 team	Czech Republic; Jiří Prskavec; Vavřinec Hradilek; Ondřej Tunka	104.19	Slovakia; Martin Halčin; Andrej Málek; Jakub Grigar	104.38	Great Britain; Richard Hounslow; Joe Clarke; Bradley Forbes-Cryans	106.38

=== Women ===
==== Canoe ====
Event	Gold		Silver		Bronze	
C1	Jessica Fox (AUS)	113.51	Kateřina Hošková (CZE)	118.42	Núria Vilarrubla (ESP)	121.55
C1 team	Australia; Jessica Fox; Rosalyn Lawrence; Alison Borrows	144.04	Czech Republic; Kateřina Hošková; Monika Jančová; Tereza Fišerová	144.92	Austria; Julia Schmid; Viktoria Wolffhardt; Nadine Weratschnig	150.72

==== Kayak ====
Event	Gold		Silver		Bronze	
K1	Kateřina Kudějová (CZE)	103.62	Ricarda Funk (GER)	105.91	Melanie Pfeifer (GER)	106.33
K1 team	Czech Republic; Kateřina Kudějová; Veronika Vojtová; Štěpánka Hilgertová	127.33	Great Britain; Fiona Pennie; Kimberley Woods; Lizzie Neave	128.06	France; Carole Bouzidi; Marie-Zélia Lafont; Émilie Fer	129.02
