= Jerguš Baďura =

Slovak-Norwegian slalom canoeist (born 1991)

Personal information
- Nationality: Slovak
- Born: 22 December 1991 (age 34)
- Years active: 2007–2019

Sport
- Country: Slovakia, Norway
- Sport: Canoe slalom
- Event: C1
- Club: ŠCP
Medal record
Men's canoe slalom
Representing Slovakia
European Championships
Gold medal – first place	2013 Kraków	C1 team
U23 World Championships
Silver medal – second place	2014 Penrith	C1 team
Bronze medal – third place	2013 Liptovský Mikuláš	C1
U23 European Championships
Bronze medal – third place	2010 Markkleeberg	C1 team

Jerguš Baďura (born 22 December 1991) is a Slovak-Norwegian former slalom canoeist who competed at the international level from 2007 to 2019, specializing in the C1 discipline. Originally from Slovakia, Baďura represented Norway from 2016 to 2019.

He won a gold medal in the C1 team event at the 2013 European Canoe Slalom Championships in Kraków.

== Major championships results timeline ==
Representing Slovakia until 2015 and Norway from 2016.

Event		2013	2014	2015	2016	2017
World Championships	C1	—	—	—	Not held	37
European Championships	C1	12	—	—	26	21
European Championships	C1 team	1	—	—	—	—
