= Jonathan Marc =

Canoe slalom racer (born 1988)

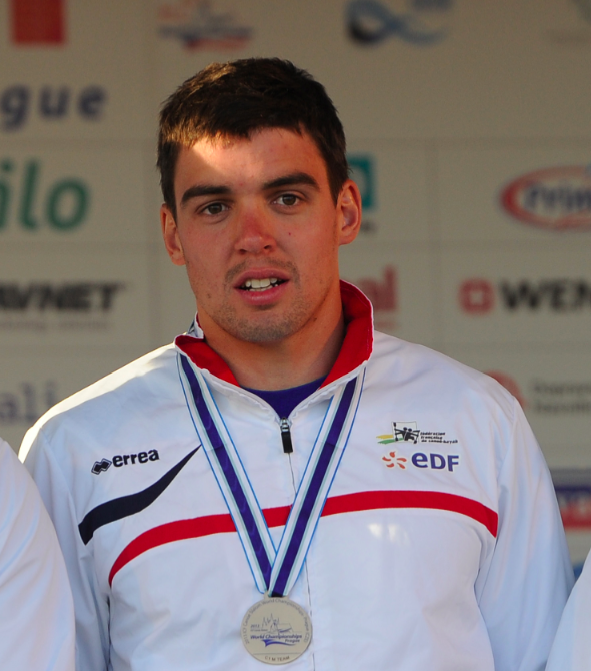
- Jonathan Marc

Personal information
- Born: 12 January 1988 (age 38) Lannion, France
Medal record
Men's canoe slalom
Representing France
World Championships
Bronze medal – third place	2013 Prague	C1 team
U23 European Championships
Bronze medal – third place	2007 Kraków	C1 team
Bronze medal – third place	2008 Solkan	C1 team
Junior European Championships
Gold medal – first place	2005 Kraków	C1 team

Jonathan Marc (born 12 January 1988 in Lannion) is a French slalom canoeist who has competed at the international level since 2005.

He won a bronze medal in the C1 team event at the 2013 ICF Canoe Slalom World Championships in Prague.
