= Eva Terčelj =

Slovenian slalom canoeist (born 1992)

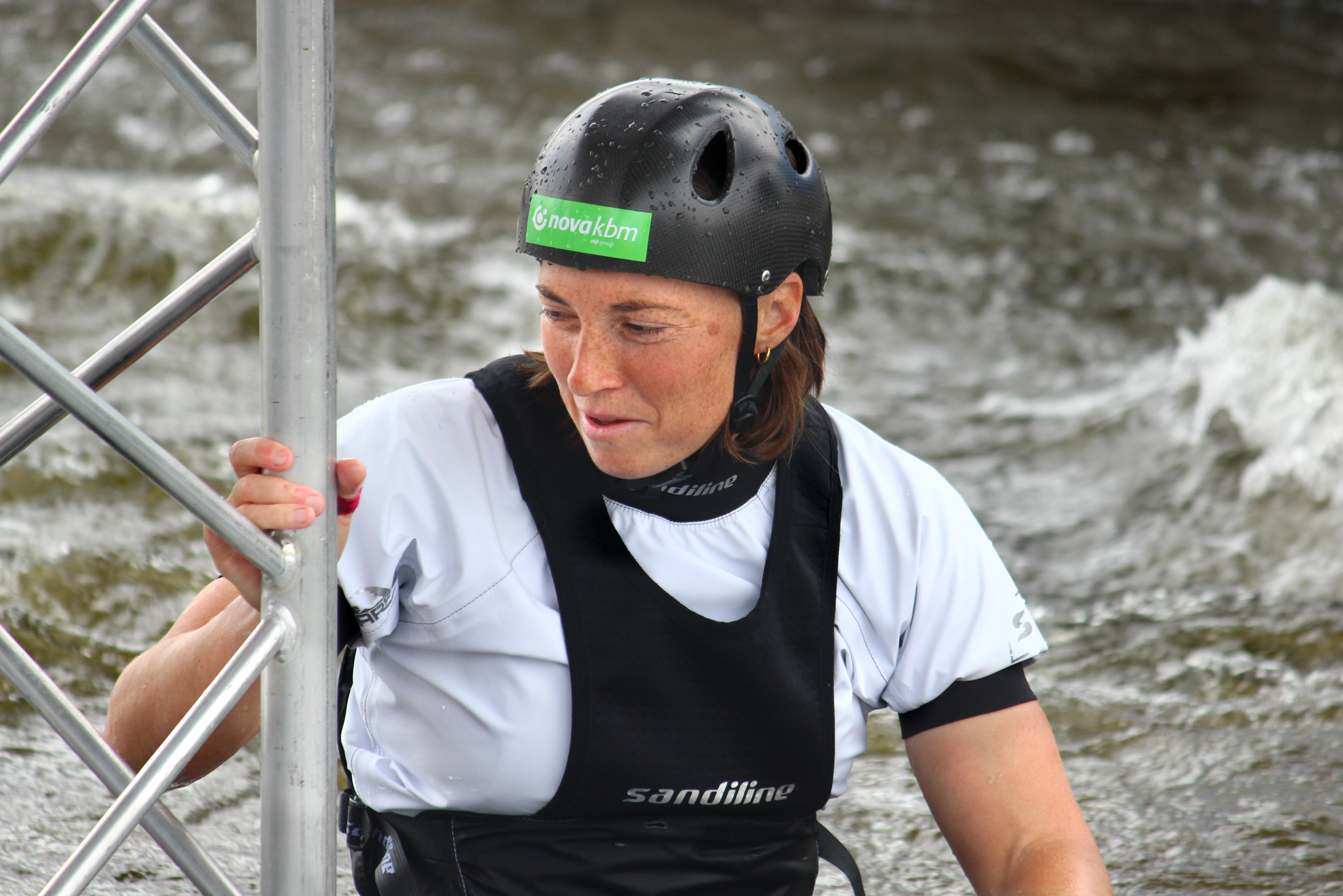

Personal information
- Nationality: Slovenian
- Born: 21 January 1992 (age 34) Ljubljana, Slovenia
- Height: 1.66 m (5 ft 5 in)
- Weight: 57 kg (126 lb)

Sport
- Country: Slovenia
- Sport: Canoe slalom
- Event: K1, Kayak cross
- Club: Kajak kanu klub Ljubljana
Medal record
Women's canoe slalom
Representing Slovenia
World Championships
Gold medal – first place	2019 La Seu d'Urgell	K1
Silver medal – second place	2022 Augsburg	K1 team
Bronze medal – third place	2010 Tacen	K1 team
Bronze medal – third place	2013 Prague	K1 team
Bronze medal – third place	2023 London	Kayak cross
European Championships
Gold medal – first place	2017 Tacen	K1 team
Gold medal – first place	2024 Tacen	K1 team
Silver medal – second place	2021 Ivrea	K1
U23 European Championships
Gold medal – first place	2010 Markkleeberg	K1 team
Gold medal – first place	2011 Banja Luka	K1
Gold medal – first place	2012 Solkan	K1
Gold medal – first place	2014 Skopje	K1 team
Bronze medal – third place	2014 Skopje	K1
Bronze medal – third place	2007 Kraków	K1 team
Junior World Championships
Gold medal – first place	2008 Roudnice nad Labem	K1
Bronze medal – third place	2010 Foix	K1
Junior European Championships
Silver medal – second place	2008 Solkan	K1
Silver medal – second place	2008 Solkan	K1 team
Bronze medal – third place	2010 Markkleeberg	K1

Eva Terčelj (born 21 January 1992) is a Slovenian slalom canoeist who has competed at the international level since 2007.

She won five medals at the ICF Canoe Slalom World Championships with a gold (K1: 2019), a silver (K1 team: 2022) and three bronzes (Kayak cross: 2023; K1 team: 2010, 2013). She also won three medals (2 golds and 1 silver) at the European Championships.

Terčelj competed at three Olympic Games. She finished in 13th place in the K1 event at the 2012 Summer Olympics in London after being eliminated in the semifinal. She then competed in the K1 event at the delayed 2020 Summer Olympics in Tokyo, finishing 24th after, once again, being eliminated in the semifinal. At the 2024 Summer Olympics in Paris, she finished 7th in the K1 event and 18th in kayak cross.

In 2010 Eva Terčelj finished the Bežigrad Grammar School and in 2018 received a master's degree in architecture from the Faculty of Architecture at the University of Ljubljana.

== World Cup individual podiums ==
	1st place, gold medalist(s)	2nd place, silver medalist(s)	3rd place, bronze medalist(s)	Total
K1	1	2	6	9
Kayak cross	1	2	0	3
Total	2	4	6	12

Season	Date	Venue	Position	Event
2013	7 July 2013	La Seu d'Urgell	1st	K1
2013	18 August 2013	Tacen	3rd	K1
2016	4 September 2016	Prague	3rd	K1
2017	2 July 2017	Markkleeberg	3rd	K1
2018	7 July 2018	Augsburg	3rd	K1
2019	29 June 2019	Tacen	2nd	K1
2019	7 September 2019	Prague	3rd	K1
2022	28 August 2022	Pau	2nd	Kayak cross
2023	18 June 2023	Tacen	2nd	Kayak cross
2024	2 June 2024	Augsburg	1st	Kayak cross
2024	14 September 2024	Ivrea	3rd	K1
2024	20 September 2024	La Seu d'Urgell	2nd	K1

Olympic Games
Preceded by Vasilij Žbogar	Flagbearer for Slovenia; Tokyo 2020	Succeeded by Ana Gros and Benjamin Savšek
