= Denis Gargaud Chanut =

French slalom canoeist

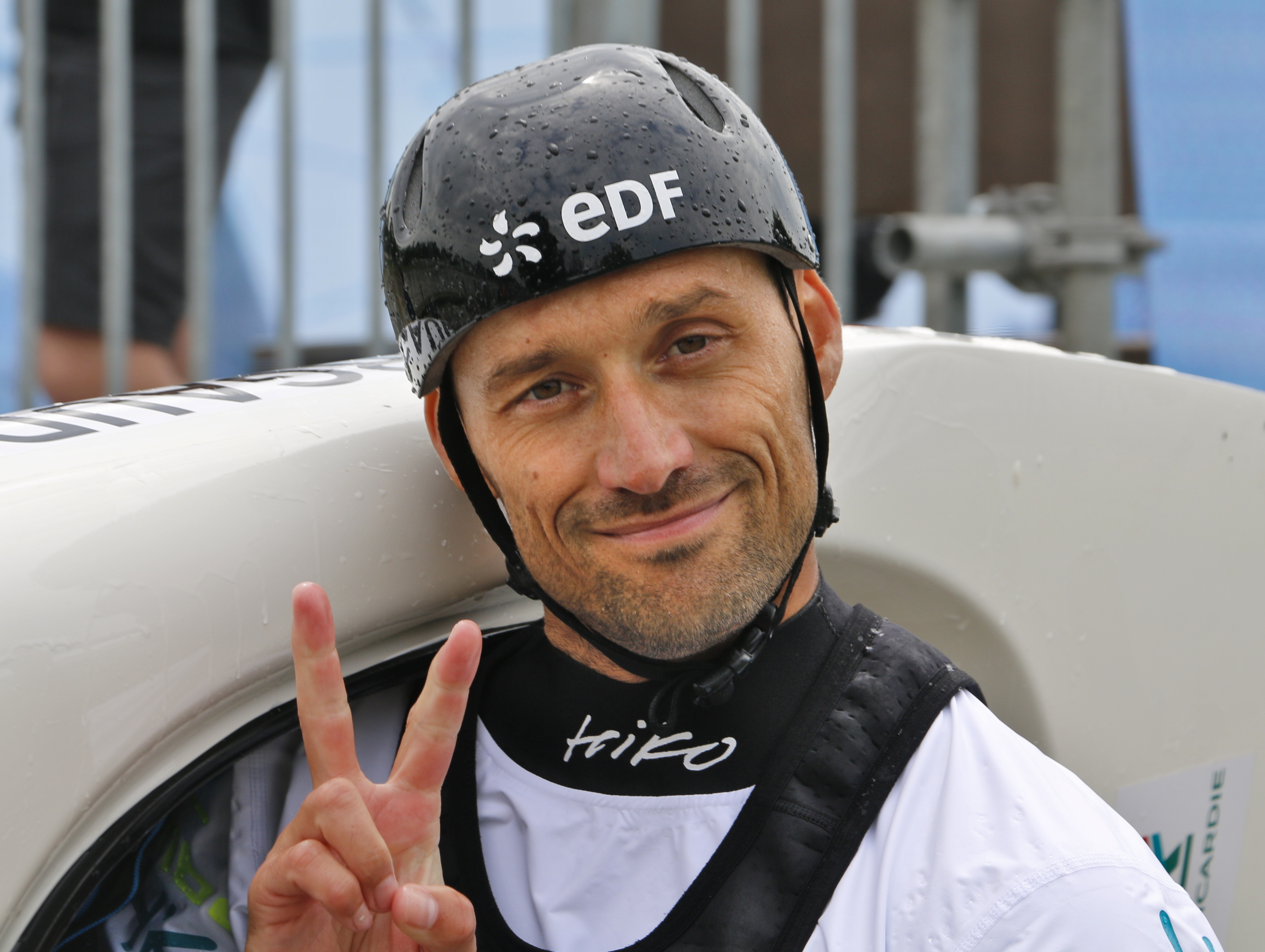
- Gargaud Chanut in 2024

Personal information
- Nationality: French
- Born: 22 July 1987 (age 39) Marseille, France
- Education: KEDGE Business School, Marseille
- Height: 181 cm (5 ft 11 in)
- Weight: 76 kg (168 lb)

Sport
- Sport: Canoe slalom
- Event: C1, C2
- Club: Marseille Mazargues Canoe Kayak
- Coached by: Albert Tobelem (club); Benoît Peschier (national)
Medal record
Representing France
Event	1st	2nd	3rd
Olympic Games	1	0	0
World Championships	4	3	2
European Championships	3	2	4
U23 European Championships	1	1	2
Junior European Championships	1	0	1
Total	10	6	9
Olympic Games
Gold medal – first place	2016 Rio de Janeiro	C1
World Championships
Gold medal – first place	2010 Tacen	C2 team
Gold medal – first place	2011 Bratislava	C1
Gold medal – first place	2011 Bratislava	C2 team
Gold medal – first place	2021 Bratislava	C1 team
Silver medal – second place	2009 La Seu d'Urgell	C1 team
Silver medal – second place	2010 Tacen	C2
Silver medal – second place	2011 Bratislava	C2
Bronze medal – third place	2013 Prague	C1 team
Bronze medal – third place	2017 Pau	C1 team
European Championships
Gold medal – first place	2011 La Seu d'Urgell	C1 team
Gold medal – first place	2018 Prague	C1 team
Gold medal – first place	2021 Ivrea	C1
Silver medal – second place	2009 Nottingham	C1 team
Silver medal – second place	2019 Pau	C1 team
Bronze medal – third place	2010 Bratislava	C1 team
Bronze medal – third place	2011 La Seu d'Urgell	C1
Bronze medal – third place	2012 Augsburg	C1 team
Bronze medal – third place	2018 Prague	C2 team
U23 European Championships
Gold medal – first place	2010 Markkleeberg	C1
Silver medal – second place	2009 Liptovský Mikuláš	C1 team
Bronze medal – third place	2007 Kraków	C1 team
Bronze medal – third place	2008 Solkan	C1 team
Junior European Championships
Gold medal – first place	2005 Kraków	C1 team
Bronze medal – third place	2005 Kraków	C1

Denis Gargaud Chanut (born 22 July 1987) is a French slalom canoeist who has competed at the international level in C1 since 2004. Between 2009 and 2011 he also competed in the C2 category alongside Fabien Lefèvre. He won a gold medal in the C1 event at the 2016 Summer Olympics in Rio de Janeiro.

Gargaud Chanut also won nine medals at the ICF Canoe Slalom World Championships with four golds (C1: 2011, C1 team: 2021, C2 team: 2010, 2011), three silvers (C1 team: 2009, C2: 2010, 2011) and two bronzes (C1 team: 2013, 2017). He won nine medals at the European Championships (three golds, two silvers and four bronzes).

Gargaud Chanut finished the 2011 season as the World No. 1 in the C1 event. He won the overall World Cup title in C1 in 2021.

Denis's aunt and uncle, Pierre and Cathy Chassigneux, were French champions in the mixed C2 category and run a canoe-kayak club on the Loire river in Orléans; Denis took up canoeing there aged 12. He later excelled internationally, but failed to qualify for the 2008 and 2012 Olympics due to a strong competition with Tony Estanguet, and considered retiring.

Denis is the founder and head of the Duo Tonic and Mulebar company, which produces bars drinks and energy gels for athletes.

== World Cup individual podiums ==
	1st place, gold medalist(s)	2nd place, silver medalist(s)	3rd place, bronze medalist(s)	Total
C1	5	2	2	9
C2	0	2	0	2
Total	5	4	2	11

Season	Date	Venue	Position	Event
2009	28 June 2009	Pau	2nd	C2
2010	3 July 2010	Augsburg	2nd	C2
2011	13 August 2011	Prague	2nd	C1
2014	16 August 2014	Augsburg	1st	C1
2015	8 August 2015	La Seu d'Urgell	1st	C1
2015	15 August 2015	Pau	3rd	C1
2016	11 June 2016	La Seu d'Urgell	2nd	C1
2018	8 September 2018	La Seu d'Urgell	3rd	C1
2021	20 June 2021	Markkleeberg	1st	C1
2021	12 September 2021	Pau	1st	C1
2022	28 August 2022	Pau	1st	C1
