= 2017 Canoe Slalom World Cup =

Canoe Slalom World Cup

The 2017 Canoe Slalom World Cup was a series of five races in canoe slalom organized by the International Canoe Federation (ICF). It was the 30th edition. Before the first World Cup race it was determined that the men's C2 class would be removed from the Olympic program. This resulted in a reduced number of participants in this event. The C2 mixed event was raced for the first time as part of the World Cup in Prague, though only 4 crews entered (3 of them Czech) and no points were awarded. The K1 cross was renamed as Extreme Kayak, but still no world cup points were awarded for the event.

== Calendar ==
The series opened with World Cup Race 1 in Prague, Czech Republic (June 16–18) and concluded with the World Cup Final in La Seu d'Urgell, Spain (September 8–10).

Label	Venue	Date
World Cup Race 1	(Czech Republic) Prague	16–18 June
World Cup Race 2	(Germany) Augsburg	23–25 June
World Cup Race 3	(Germany) Markkleeberg	30 June - 2 July
World Cup Race 4	(Italy) Ivrea	1–3 September
World Cup Final	(Spain) La Seu d'Urgell	8–10 September

== Standings ==
The winner of each race was awarded 60 points (double points were awarded for the World Cup Final for all the competitors who reached at least the semifinal stage). Points for lower places differed from one category to another. Every participant was guaranteed at least 2 points for participation and 5 points for qualifying for the semifinal run (10 points in the World Cup Final). If two or more athletes or boats were equal on points, the ranking was determined by their positions in the World Cup Final.

=== C1 men ===
Pos	Athlete	CZE (Czech Republic)	GER (Germany)	GER (Germany)	ITA (Italy)	ESP (Spain)	Points
1	Sideris Tasiadis (GER)	1	2	2	1	4	322
2	Benjamin Savšek (SLO)	4	5	4	16	1	283
3	Alexander Slafkovský (SVK)	27	4	16	2	2	249
4	Matej Beňuš (SVK)	2	1	12	3	17	248
5	Luka Božič (SLO)	7	10	15	4	14	206
6	Michal Martikán (SVK)	8	57	1	5	13	204
7	Anže Berčič (SLO)	14	11	8	15	11	191
8	Václav Chaloupka (CZE)	12	16	32	14	7	169
9	Ryan Westley (GBR)	10	30	7		5	167
10	Lukáš Rohan (CZE)			6	7	6	166

=== C1 women ===
Pos	Athlete	CZE (Czech Republic)	GER (Germany)	GER (Germany)	ITA (Italy)	ESP (Spain)	Points
1	Jessica Fox (AUS)	24	1	1	1	2	307
2	Tereza Fišerová (CZE)	4	10	6	3	11	236
3	Nadine Weratschnig (AUT)	23	20	4	4	3	234
4	Núria Vilarrubla (ESP)	25	7	2		1	230
5	Mallory Franklin (GBR)	2	2	20		6	217
6	Viktoria Wolffhardt (AUT)	14	28	21	2	5	203
7	Rosalyn Lawrence (AUS)	9	18	3	6	18	203
8	Ana Sátila (BRA)	10	8	11	26	7	197
9	Kimberley Woods (GBR)	1	30	9		4	193
10	Lena Stöcklin (GER)	12	3	5	18	24	184

=== C2 Men ===
Pos	Athletes	CZE (Czech Republic)	GER (Germany)	GER (Germany)	ITA (Italy)	ESP (Spain)	Points
1	Robert Behling/Thomas Becker (GER)	10	1	3	2	1	312
2	Jonáš Kašpar/Marek Šindler (CZE)	1	2	1	4	4	310
3	Gauthier Klauss/Matthieu Péché (FRA)	2	3	4	3	3	300
4	David Schröder/Nico Bettge (GER)	11	8	6	11	2	228
5	Ladislav Škantár/Peter Škantár (SVK)	12	9	7	1	6	225
6	Ondřej Karlovský/Jakub Jáně (CZE)	7	5	5		8	186
7	Tomáš Kučera/Ján Bátik (SVK)	4	12	13	5	10	181
8	Pierre Picco/Hugo Biso (FRA)	3	10	12	7	12	176
9	Nicolas Scianimanico/Hugo Cailhol (FRA)	5	11	2	14	14	171
10	Tomáš Koplík/Jakub Vrzáň (CZE)	9	13		15	9	124

=== K1 men ===
Pos	Athlete	CZE (Czech Republic)	GER (Germany)	GER (Germany)	ITA (Italy)	ESP (Spain)	Points
1	Vít Přindiš (CZE)	1	1	17	1	6	292
2	Sebastian Schubert (GER)	3	4	2	16	4	266
3	Peter Kauzer (SLO)	30	7	20	3	1	251
4	Jiří Prskavec (CZE)	2	3	6		3	247
5	Lucien Delfour (AUS)	4	8	5	13	16	217
6	Michal Smolen (USA)	9	17	26	2	23	185
7	Giovanni De Gennaro (ITA)	31	21	1	28	=11	183
8	Jakub Grigar (SVK)	10	10	34	5	22	176
9	Ondřej Tunka (CZE)	7	9	25		=11	168
10	Vavřinec Hradilek (CZE)	11	12	10	35	19	167

=== K1 women ===
Pos	Athlete	CZE (Czech Republic)	GER (Germany)	GER (Germany)	ITA (Italy)	ESP (Spain)	Points
1	Ricarda Funk (GER)	3	1	1	1	1	350
2	Jessica Fox (AUS)	10	11	2	2	2	286
3	Jana Dukátová (SVK)	9	2	5	6	8	253
4	Urša Kragelj (SLO)	7	3	29	4	5	231
5	Maialen Chourraut (ESP)	1	13	13		3	220
6	Stefanie Horn (ITA)	5	16	8	8	13	207
7	Eva Terčelj (SLO)	11	17	3	5	16	206
8	Jasmin Schornberg (GER)	25	6	4	21	12	187
9	Kateřina Kudějová (CZE)	13	28	24	16	6	167
10	Mallory Franklin (GBR)	4	4	16		21	163

- Incumbent World Cup Champion

== Points ==
- World Cup points were awarded on the results of each race at each event as follows:

Position	1st	2nd	3rd	4th	5th	6th	7th	8th	9th	10th
C1 M	60	55	50	46	44	42	40	38	36	34
C1 W	60	55	50	46	44	42	40	38	36	34
C2 M	60	55	50	45	42	39	36	33	30	27
K1 M	60	55	50	44	43	42	41	40	39	38
K1 W	60	55	50	46	44	42	40	38	36	34

== Results ==
=== World Cup Race 1 ===
The first World Cup event in Prague, Czech Republic, held from 16 to 18 June, saw the introduction of the C2 mixed class to the World Cup. Only 4 boats entered the event, three of which were from the host nation. No World Cup points were awarded for this event.

Eleven athletes were allowed to start in the men's C1 final after the jury couldn't decide whether the boat of Matej Beňuš was legal. Edern Le Ruyet was the 11th paddler.

Event	Gold	Score	Silver	Score	Bronze	Score
C1 men	Sideris Tasiadis (GER)	100.36	Matej Beňuš (SVK)	101.88	Raffaello Ivaldi (ITA)	101.91
C1 women	Kimberley Woods (GBR)	111.15	Mallory Franklin (GBR)	115.13	Monika Jančová (CZE)	117.56
C2 men	Jonáš Kašpar/Marek Šindler (CZE)	104.66	Gauthier Klauss/Matthieu Péché (FRA)	107.42	Pierre Picco/Hugo Biso (FRA)	109.93
K1 men	Vít Přindiš (CZE)	88.55	Jiří Prskavec (CZE)	89.38	Sebastian Schubert (GER)	91.44
K1 women	Maialen Chourraut (ESP)	104.68	Kimberley Woods (GBR)	104.92	Ricarda Funk (GER)	108.06
C2 mixed	Tereza Fišerová/Jakub Jáně (CZE)	127.82	Veronika Vojtová/Jan Mašek (CZE)	184.66	Sabina Foltysová/Jakub Vrzáň (CZE)	288.45
Extreme K1 men	Michael Dawson (NZL)		Vavřinec Hradilek (CZE)		Ondřej Tunka (CZE)	
Extreme K1 women	Amálie Hilgertová (CZE)		Camille Prigent (FRA)		Tereza Fišerová (CZE)	

=== World Cup Race 2 ===
The second race of the series took place at the Augsburg Eiskanal, Germany from 23 to 25 June.

Event	Gold	Score	Silver	Score	Bronze	Score
C1 men	Matej Beňuš (SVK)	104.90	Sideris Tasiadis (GER)	106.29	Franz Anton (GER)	106.84
C1 women	Jessica Fox (AUS)	116.86	Mallory Franklin (GBR)	127.07	Lena Stöcklin (GER)	133.88
C2 men	Robert Behling/Thomas Becker (GER)	109.96	Jonáš Kašpar/Marek Šindler (CZE)	110.89	Gauthier Klauss/Matthieu Péché (FRA)	111.39
K1 men	Vít Přindiš (CZE)	97.40	Hannes Aigner (GER)	97.64	Jiří Prskavec (CZE)	97.93
K1 women	Ricarda Funk (GER)	107.67	Jana Dukátová (SVK)	108.62	Urša Kragelj (SLO)	109.23
Extreme K1 men	Boris Neveu (FRA)		Hannes Aigner (GER)		Michael Dawson (NZL)	
Extreme K1 women	Jasmin Schornberg (GER)		Martina Wegman (NED)		Selina Jones (GER)	

=== World Cup Race 3 ===
The third race of the series took place at Kanupark Markkleeberg, Germany from 30 June to 2 July.

Event	Gold	Score	Silver	Score	Bronze	Score
C1 men	Michal Martikán (SVK)	100.88	Sideris Tasiadis (GER)	101.57	Adam Burgess (GBR)	101.76
C1 women	Jessica Fox (AUS)	101.46	Núria Vilarrubla (ESP)	106.40	Rosalyn Lawrence (AUS)	111.46
C2 men	Jonáš Kašpar/Marek Šindler (CZE)	108.95	Nicolas Scianimanico/Hugo Cailhol (FRA)	109.25	Robert Behling/Thomas Becker (GER)	109.39
K1 men	Giovanni De Gennaro (ITA)	92.83	Sebastian Schubert (GER)	95.78	Kazuya Adachi (JPN)	98.29
K1 women	Ricarda Funk (GER)	103.85	Jessica Fox (AUS)	106.31	Eva Terčelj (SLO)	109.17
Extreme K1 men	Vít Přindiš (CZE)		Antoine Launay (POR)		Boris Neveu (FRA)	
Extreme K1 women	Tereza Fišerová (CZE)		Amálie Hilgertová (CZE)		Marie-Zélia Lafont (FRA)	

=== World Cup Race 4 ===
1-3 September in Ivrea, Italy

Event	Gold	Score	Silver	Score	Bronze	Score
C1 men	Sideris Tasiadis (GER)	91.10	Alexander Slafkovský (SVK)	91.97	Matej Beňuš (SVK)	94.17
C1 women	Jessica Fox (AUS)	100.83	Viktoria Wolffhardt (AUT)	111.57	Tereza Fišerová (CZE)	115.70
C2 men	Ladislav Škantár/Peter Škantár (SVK)	100.99	Robert Behling/Thomas Becker (GER)	102.54	Gauthier Klauss/Matthieu Péché (FRA)	103.14
K1 men	Vít Přindiš (CZE)	87.15	Michal Smolen (USA)	87.44	Peter Kauzer (SLO)	89.31
K1 women	Ricarda Funk (GER)	97.80	Jessica Fox (AUS)	98.94	Lisa Leitner (AUT)	99.44
Extreme K1 men	Hannes Aigner (GER)		Christian De Dionigi (ITA)		Tren Long (USA)	
Extreme K1 women	Ana Sátila (BRA)		Amálie Hilgertová (CZE)		Sage Donnelly (USA)	

=== World Cup Final ===
The final race of the series took place at Segre Olympic Park in La Seu d'Urgell, Spain from 8 to 10 September.

Event	Gold	Score	Silver	Score	Bronze	Score
C1 men	Benjamin Savšek (SLO)	94.12	Alexander Slafkovský (SVK)	94.25	Martin Thomas (FRA)	94.56
C1 women	Núria Vilarrubla (ESP)	108.37	Jessica Fox (AUS)	110.89	Nadine Weratschnig (AUT)	113.01
C2 men	Robert Behling/Thomas Becker (GER)	102.81	David Schröder/Nico Bettge (GER)	103.81	Gauthier Klauss/Matthieu Péché (FRA)	104.16
K1 men	Peter Kauzer (SLO)	86.96	Boris Neveu (FRA)	87.00	Jiří Prskavec (CZE)	88.69
K1 women	Ricarda Funk (GER)	96.82	Jessica Fox (AUS)	97.63	Maialen Chourraut (ESP)	98.15
Extreme K1 men	Hannes Aigner (GER)		Michael Dawson (NZL)		David Llorente (ESP)	
Extreme K1 women	Martina Wegman (NED)		Camille Prigent (FRA)		Polina Mukhgaleeva (RUS)	

== See also ==
- 2017 ICF Canoe Slalom World Championships
