= 2018 Canoe Slalom World Cup =

The 2018 Canoe Slalom World Cup was a series of five races in 5 canoeing and kayaking categories organized by the International Canoe Federation (ICF). It was the 31st edition. The men's C2 event was removed from the World Cup program before the start of the season by the ICF and was replaced by the mixed C2 event. This was the first season when points were awarded also for the Extreme K1 events.

== Calendar ==
The series opened with World Cup Race 1 in Liptovský Mikuláš, Slovakia (22–24 June) and ended with the World Cup Final in La Seu d'Urgell, Spain (7–9 September) for the traditional canoe slalom events. The World Championships counted for the overall world cup standings of the Extreme K1 events, but not for the traditional canoe slalom events.

Label	Venue	Date	Notes
World Cup Race 1	(Slovakia) Liptovský Mikuláš	22–24 June	
World Cup Race 2	(Poland) Kraków	29 June – 1 July	
World Cup Race 3	(Germany) Augsburg	6–8 July	
World Cup Race 4	(Slovenia) Tacen	31 August – 2 September	Extreme K1 events cancelled
World Cup Final	(Spain) La Seu d'Urgell	7–9 September	No Extreme K1 events
World Championships	(Brazil) Rio de Janeiro	25-30 September	Only Extreme K1 events count for world cup standings

== Standings ==
The winner of each race was awarded 60 points (double points were awarded for the World Cup Final for all the competitors who reach at least the semifinal stage, double points were also awarded for the World Championships in Extreme K1 events). Points for lower places differed from one category to another. Every participant was guaranteed at least 2 points for participation and 5 points for qualifying for the semifinal run (10 points in the World Cup Final). If two or more athletes or boats were equal on points, the ranking was determined by their positions in the World Cup Final.

=== C1 men ===
Pos	Athlete	SVK (Slovakia)	POL (Poland)	GER (Germany)	SLO (Slovenia)	ESP (Spain)	Points
1	Alexander Slafkovský (SVK)	2	2	2	2	8	296
2	Luka Božič (SLO)	4	11	3	10	1	282
3	Sideris Tasiadis (GER)	1	19	1	1	11	268
4	Benjamin Savšek (SLO)	11	5	8	5	4	250
5	Franz Anton (GER)	23	16	17	3	2	232
6	Ryan Westley (GBR)	3	6	6		5	222
7	Michal Martikán (SVK)	5	20	5	6	=12	215
8	Denis Gargaud Chanut (FRA)	6	28	11	14	3	212
9	Cédric Joly (FRA)	9	9	60	13	6	188
10	Matej Beňuš (SVK)	7	4	13	30	=12	183

=== C1 women ===
Pos	Athlete	SVK (Slovakia)	POL (Poland)	GER (Germany)	SLO (Slovenia)	ESP (Spain)	Points
1	Jessica Fox (AUS)	1	1	1	1	1	360
2	Mallory Franklin (GBR)	3	15	2		2	243
3	Viktoria Wolffhardt (AUT)	6	4	6	5	10	242
4	Tereza Fišerová (CZE)	2	11	9	26	6	228
5	Andrea Herzog (GER)	5	28	10	15	4	207
6	Rosalyn Lawrence (AUS)	26	17	8	2	13	202
7	Noemie Fox (AUS)	7	7	19		7	184
8	Kimberley Woods (GBR)	4	9	4		16	182
9	Lucie Baudu (FRA)	8	13	7		12	170
10	Nadine Weratschnig (AUT)	28	25	23	25	3	165

=== C2 mixed ===
Pos	Athletes	SVK (Slovakia)	POL (Poland)	GER (Germany)	SLO (Slovenia)	ESP (Spain)	Points
1	Tereza Fišerová/Jakub Jáně (CZE)	2	1	2	4	1	335
2	Yves Prigent/Margaux Henry (FRA)	3	4	8	2	2	293
3	Veronika Vojtová/Jan Mašek (CZE)	4	8	3	1	3	288
4	Aleksandra Stach/Marcin Pochwała (POL)		3	10		5	161
5	Jana Matulková/Vojtěch Mrůzek (CZE)	6	10	6	3		155
6	Lois Betteridge/Yannick Laviolette (CAN)	9	12	12		7	144
7	Núria Vilarrubla/Samuel Hernanz (ESP)	11	9			4	143
8	Soňa Stanovská/Ján Bátik (SVK)	1	2	11			138
9	David Schröder/Cindy Pöschel (GER)	7	7	5			114
10	Guo Linlong/Xu Yongzhao (CHN)	10	5	7			105

=== K1 men ===
Pos	Athlete	SVK (Slovakia)	POL (Poland)	GER (Germany)	SLO (Slovenia)	ESP (Spain)	Points
1	Jiří Prskavec (CZE)	4	3	2	2	3	304
2	Mathieu Biazizzo (FRA)	5	17	7	3	8	242
3	Vít Přindiš (CZE)	7	8	24	10	7	222
4	Joe Clarke (GBR)	3	1	4		11	222
5	Dariusz Popiela (POL)	2	6	11	14	19	214
6	Hannes Aigner (GER)	19	37	3	8	4	212
7	Peter Kauzer (SLO)	35	2	1	11	20	209
8	Sebastian Schubert (GER)	1	7	34	7	34	175
9	Giovanni De Gennaro (ITA)	39	13	32		1	171
10	Boris Neveu (FRA)	11	16	6		12	171

=== K1 women ===
Pos	Athlete	SVK (Slovakia)	POL (Poland)	GER (Germany)	SLO (Slovenia)	ESP (Spain)	Points
1	Jessica Fox (AUS)	1	1	1	2	10	303
2	Ricarda Funk (GER)	3	5	4	6	1	302
3	Corinna Kuhnle (AUT)	2	9	6	1	4	285
4	Eva Terčelj (SLO)	7	13	3	8	8	234
5	Mallory Franklin (GBR)	10	25	2		3	204
6	Kateřina Kudějová (CZE)	15		7	5	7	192
7	Viktoria Wolffhardt (AUT)	5	15	27	3	16	187
8	Rosalyn Lawrence (AUS)	14	11	10	10	19	177
9	Klaudia Zwolińska (POL)	4	20	13	13	20	175
10	Urša Kragelj (SLO)	17	28	9	4	15	173

=== Extreme K1 men ===
Pos	Athlete	Points
1	Pavel Eigel (RUS)	158
2	Mike Dawson (NZL)	139
3	Christian De Dionigi (ITA)	120
4	Michal Smolen (USA)	119
5	Boris Neveu (FRA)	110
6	Pedro Gonçalves (BRA)	102
7	Thomas Bersinger (ARG)	100
7	Jakub Stanovský (SVK)	97
9	Ben Hayward (CAN)	92
10	Vít Přindiš (CZE)	90

=== Extreme K1 women ===
Pos	Athlete	Points
1	Martina Wegman (NED)	240
2	Ana Sátila (BRA)	235
3	Polina Mukhgaleeva (RUS)	210
4	Omira Estácia Neta (BRA)	137
5	Florence Maheu (CAN)	131
6	Yang Jie (CHN)	109
7	Marie-Zélia Lafont (FRA)	90
8	Soňa Stanovská (SVK)	84
9	Viktoriia Us (UKR)	80
10	Sage Donnelly (USA)	79

== Points ==
- World Cup points were awarded on the results of each race at each event as follows:

Position	1st	2nd	3rd	4th	5th	6th	7th	8th	9th	10th
C1 M	60	55	50	46	44	42	40	38	36	34
C1 W	60	55	50	46	44	42	40	38	36	34
C2 X	60	55	50	45	42	39	36	33	30	27
K1 M	60	55	50	44	43	42	41	40	39	38
K1 W	60	55	50	46	44	42	40	38	36	34
Extreme K1	60	55	50	45	40	35	30	25	19	17

== Results ==
=== World Cup Race 1 ===
22–24 June in Liptovský Mikuláš, Slovakia

Event	Gold	Score	Silver	Score	Bronze	Score
C1 men	Sideris Tasiadis (GER)	96.11	Alexander Slafkovský (SVK)	96.66	Ryan Westley (GBR)	97.31
C1 women	Jessica Fox (AUS)	106.34	Tereza Fišerová (CZE)	113.96	Mallory Franklin (GBR)	115.10
C2 mixed	Soňa Stanovská/Ján Bátik (SVK)	116.48	Tereza Fišerová/Jakub Jáně (CZE)	118.97	Yves Prigent/Margaux Henry (FRA)	128.26
K1 men	Sebastian Schubert (GER)	92.06	Dariusz Popiela (POL)	92.77	Joe Clarke (GBR)	93.01
K1 women	Jessica Fox (AUS)	101.20	Corinna Kuhnle (AUT)	102.78	Ricarda Funk (GER)	103.65
Extreme K1 men	Pavel Eigel (RUS)		Mike Dawson (NZL)		Dimitri Marx (SUI)	
Extreme K1 women	Sage Donnelly (USA)		Ana Sátila (BRA)		Alsu Minazova (RUS)	

=== World Cup Race 2 ===
29 June – 1 July in Kraków, Poland

Event	Gold	Score	Silver	Score	Bronze	Score
C1 men	David Florence (GBR)	83.86	Alexander Slafkovský (SVK)	84.13	Michal Jáně (CZE)	84.42
C1 women	Jessica Fox (AUS)	96.51	Núria Vilarrubla (ESP)	101.04	Ana Sátila (BRA)	101.73
C2 mixed	Tereza Fišerová/Jakub Jáně (CZE)	105.92	Soňa Stanovská/Ján Bátik (SVK)	113.92	Aleksandra Stach/Marcin Pochwała (POL)	114.59
K1 men	Joe Clarke (GBR)	76.93	Peter Kauzer (SLO)	78.24	Jiří Prskavec (CZE)	78.70
K1 women	Jessica Fox (AUS)	91.51	Lucie Baudu (FRA)	92.40	Stefanie Horn (ITA)	92.43
Extreme K1 men	Nikita Gubenko (RUS)		Mike Dawson (NZL)		Michal Smolen (USA)	
Extreme K1 women	Polina Mukhgaleeva (RUS)		Omira Estácia Neta (BRA)		Yang Jie (CHN)	

=== World Cup Race 3 ===
6–8 July in Augsburg, Germany

Event	Gold	Score	Silver	Score	Bronze	Score
C1 men	Sideris Tasiadis (GER)	100.06	Alexander Slafkovský (SVK)	100.77	Luka Božič (SLO)	102.87
C1 women	Jessica Fox (AUS)	111.15	Mallory Franklin (GBR)	115.65	Ana Sátila (BRA)	115.79
C2 mixed	Jasmin Schornberg/Thomas Becker (GER)	126.07	Tereza Fišerová/Jakub Jáně (CZE)	127.11	Veronika Vojtová/Jan Mašek (CZE)	129.39
K1 men	Peter Kauzer (SLO)	94.86	Jiří Prskavec (CZE)	95.10	Hannes Aigner (GER)	95.79
K1 women	Jessica Fox (AUS)	102.10	Mallory Franklin (GBR)	108.56	Eva Terčelj (SLO)	108.86
Extreme K1 men	Pavel Eigel (RUS)		Rafał Polaczyk (POL)		Stefan Hengst (GER)	
Extreme K1 women	Ana Sátila (BRA)		Martina Wegman (NED)		Polina Mukhgaleeva (RUS)	

=== World Cup Race 4 ===
31 August – 2 September in Tacen, Slovenia. The semifinals and finals of the women's C1 and men's K1 events that were scheduled for 2 September were canceled due to floods. The results of the heats were taken as final results for the world cup standings. The extreme K1 events were also canceled.

Event	Gold	Score	Silver	Score	Bronze	Score
C1 men	Sideris Tasiadis (GER)	103.00	Alexander Slafkovský (SVK)	103.68	Franz Anton (GER)	104.29
C1 women	Jessica Fox (AUS)	103.23	Rosalyn Lawrence (AUS)	108.38	Soňa Stanovská (SVK)	111.15
C2 mixed	Veronika Vojtová/Jan Mašek (CZE)	142.47	Yves Prigent/Margaux Henry (FRA)	220.86	Jana Matulková/Vojtěch Mrůzek (CZE)	270.56
K1 men	Žan Jakše (SLO)	82.33	Jiří Prskavec (CZE)	82.44	Mathieu Biazizzo (FRA)	84.52
K1 women	Corinna Kuhnle (AUT)	107.94	Jessica Fox (AUS)	109.01	Viktoria Wolffhardt (AUT)	113.10

=== World Cup Final ===
7–9 September in La Seu d'Urgell, Spain

Event	Gold	Score	Silver	Score	Bronze	Score
C1 men	Luka Božič (SLO)	99.84	Franz Anton (GER)	100.05	Denis Gargaud Chanut (FRA)	101.69
C1 women	Jessica Fox (AUS)	111.14	Mallory Franklin (GBR)	112.18	Nadine Weratschnig (AUT)	114.72
C2 mixed	Tereza Fišerová/Jakub Jáně (CZE)	122.05	Yves Prigent/Margaux Henry (FRA)	124.68	Veronika Vojtová/Jan Mašek (CZE)	126.06
K1 men	Giovanni De Gennaro (ITA)	93.28	Lucien Delfour (AUS)	93.87	Jiří Prskavec (CZE)	95.62
K1 women	Ricarda Funk (GER)	102.68	Maialen Chourraut (ESP)	104.45	Mallory Franklin (GBR)	105.34

=== World Championships ===
25-30 September in Rio de Janeiro, Brazil

Event	Gold	Score	Silver	Score	Bronze	Score
Extreme K1 men	Christian De Dionigi (ITA)		Boris Neveu (FRA)		Thomas Bersinger (ARG)	
Extreme K1 women	Ana Sátila (BRA)		Martina Wegman (NED)		Polina Mukhgaleeva (RUS)	

== See also ==
- 2018 ICF Canoe Slalom World Championships
