= Pavel Eigel =

Russian slalom canoeist

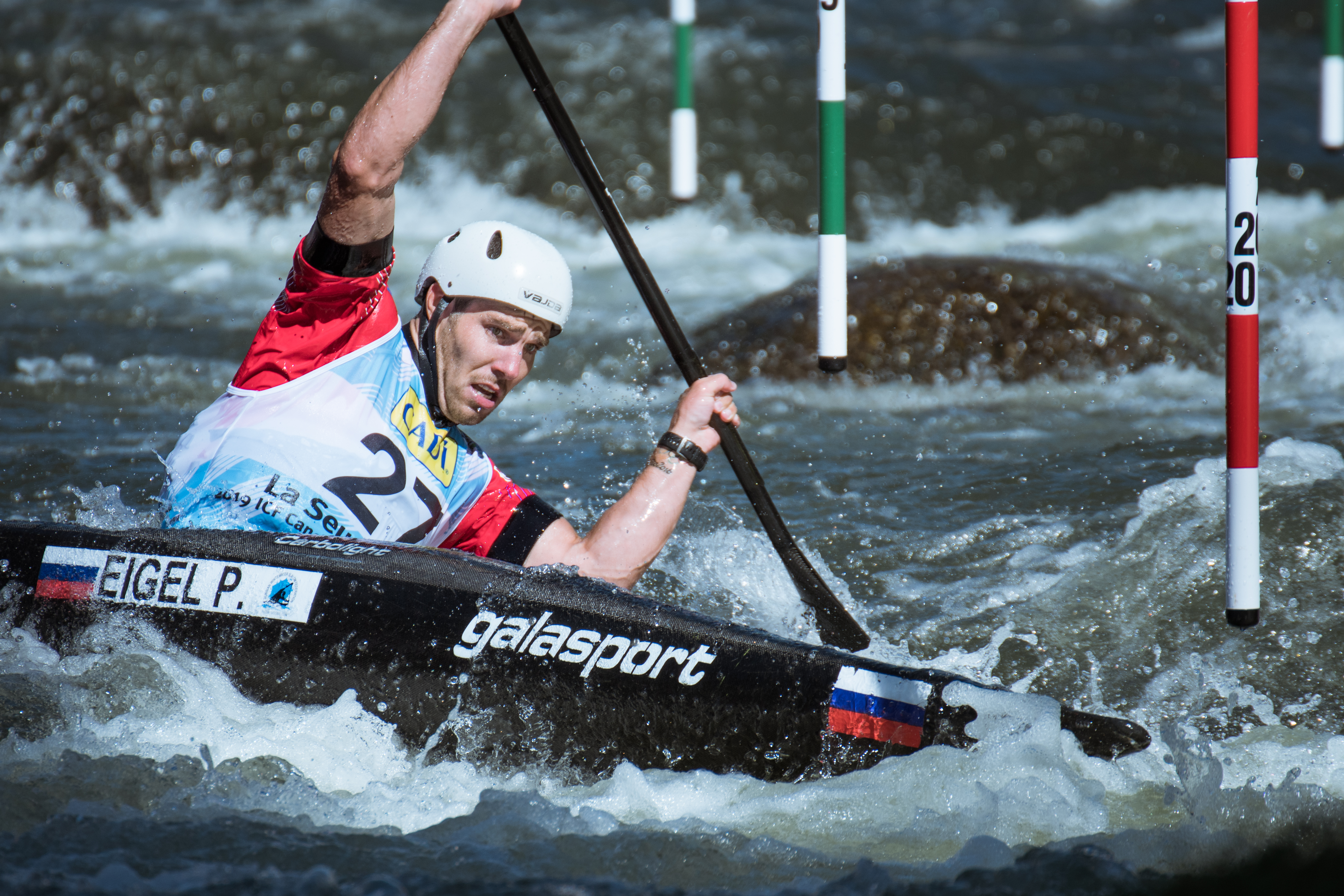

Personal information
- Full name: Pavel Pavlovich Eigel
- Nationality: Russian
- Born: 1 March 1990 (age 36) Moscow, Soviet Union
- Height: 1.78 m (5 ft 10 in)
- Weight: 81 kg (179 lb)

Sport
- Country: Russia / Uzbekistan
- Sport: Canoe slalom
- Event(s): K1, Kayak cross, C1, C2
- Club: Khlebnikovo Centre of Sports Preparation
Medal record
Men's canoe slalom
Representing Russia
World Championships
Bronze medal – third place	2018 Rio de Janeiro	K1
U23 European Championships
Silver medal – second place	2011 Banja Luka	K1 team
Silver medal – second place	2013 Bourg-Saint-Maurice	C2 team
Junior European Championships
Gold medal – first place	2008 Solkan	K1
Silver medal – second place	2007 Kraków	K1

Pavel Pavlovich Eigel (Russian: Павел Павлович Эйгель; born 1 March 1990) is a Russian-Uzbek slalom canoeist who has competed at the international level since 2005. He has represented Uzbekistan since 2025.

Eigel won a bronze medal in the K1 event at the 2018 ICF Canoe Slalom World Championships in Rio de Janeiro. He also won the overall World Cup title in the Kayak cross in 2018, the first season when this event counted for world cup points.

He finished 9th in the K1 event at the 2016 Summer Olympics in Rio de Janeiro. At the 2020 Summer Olympics in Tokyo he participated in both the C1 and the K1 events, even though he does not normally compete in C1. He finished in the last 18th position in the C1 event after only starting in the first heat. He then finished 20th in the K1 event after being eliminated in the semifinal.

== World Cup individual podiums ==
Season	Date	Venue	Position	Event
2018	24 June 2018	Liptovský Mikuláš	1st	Kayak cross
2018	8 July 2018	Augsburg	1st	Kayak cross
2020	7 November 2020	Pau	1st	Kayak cross
