= Peter Kauzer =

Slovenian slalom kayaker (born 1983)

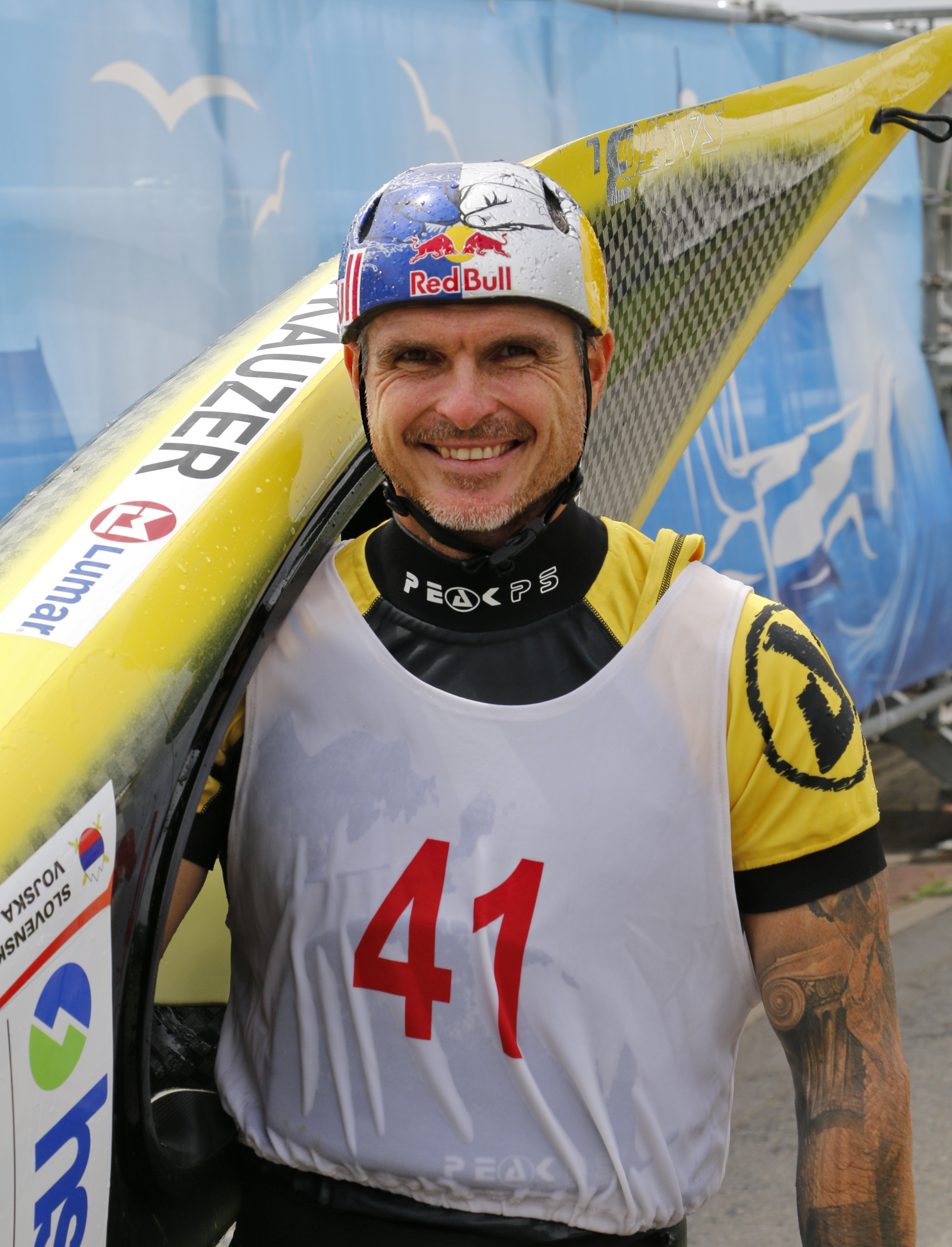
- Kauzer in 2024

Personal information
- Nationality: Slovenian
- Born: 8 September 1983 (age 42) Trbovlje, Slovenia
- Home town: Hrastnik, Slovenia
- Height: 177 cm (5 ft 10 in)
- Weight: 70 kg (154 lb)

Sport
- Country: Slovenia
- Sport: Canoe slalom
- Event: K1
- Club: BD Steklarna Hrastnik

Achievements and titles
- Highest world ranking: No. 1 (2009)
Medal record
Representing Slovenia
Olympic Games
Silver medal – second place	2016 Rio de Janeiro	K1
World Championships
Gold medal – first place	2009 La Seu d'Urgell	K1
Gold medal – first place	2011 Bratislava	K1
Gold medal – first place	2026 Oklahoma City	K1 team
Bronze medal – third place	2005 Penrith	K1 team
Bronze medal – third place	2017 Pau	K1
Bronze medal – third place	2017 Pau	K1 team
Bronze medal – third place	2021 Bratislava	K1 team
European Championships
Gold medal – first place	2005 Tacen	K1 team
Gold medal – first place	2006 L'Argentière	K1 team
Gold medal – first place	2007 Liptovský Mikuláš	K1 team
Gold medal – first place	2010 Bratislava	K1
Gold medal – first place	2011 La Seu d'Urgell	K1 team
Gold medal – first place	2018 Prague	K1
Silver medal – second place	2005 Tacen	K1
Silver medal – second place	2007 Liptovský Mikuláš	K1
Silver medal – second place	2019 Pau	K1 team
Silver medal – second place	2020 Prague	K1
Bronze medal – third place	2010 Bratislava	K1 team
Bronze medal – third place	2018 Prague	K1 team
Bronze medal – third place	2021 Ivrea	K1
U23 European Championships
Gold medal – first place	2006 Nottingham	K1
Silver medal – second place	2004 Kraków	K1 team
Junior World Championships
Gold medal – first place	2000 Bratislava	K1 team

Peter Kauzer (born 8 September 1983) is a Slovenian slalom canoeist who has competed at the international level since 1999. specializing in the K1 evemt. With an Olympic silver medal, two individual world titles and three overall World Cup titles, he is one of the most successful K1 paddlers of all time.

== Career ==
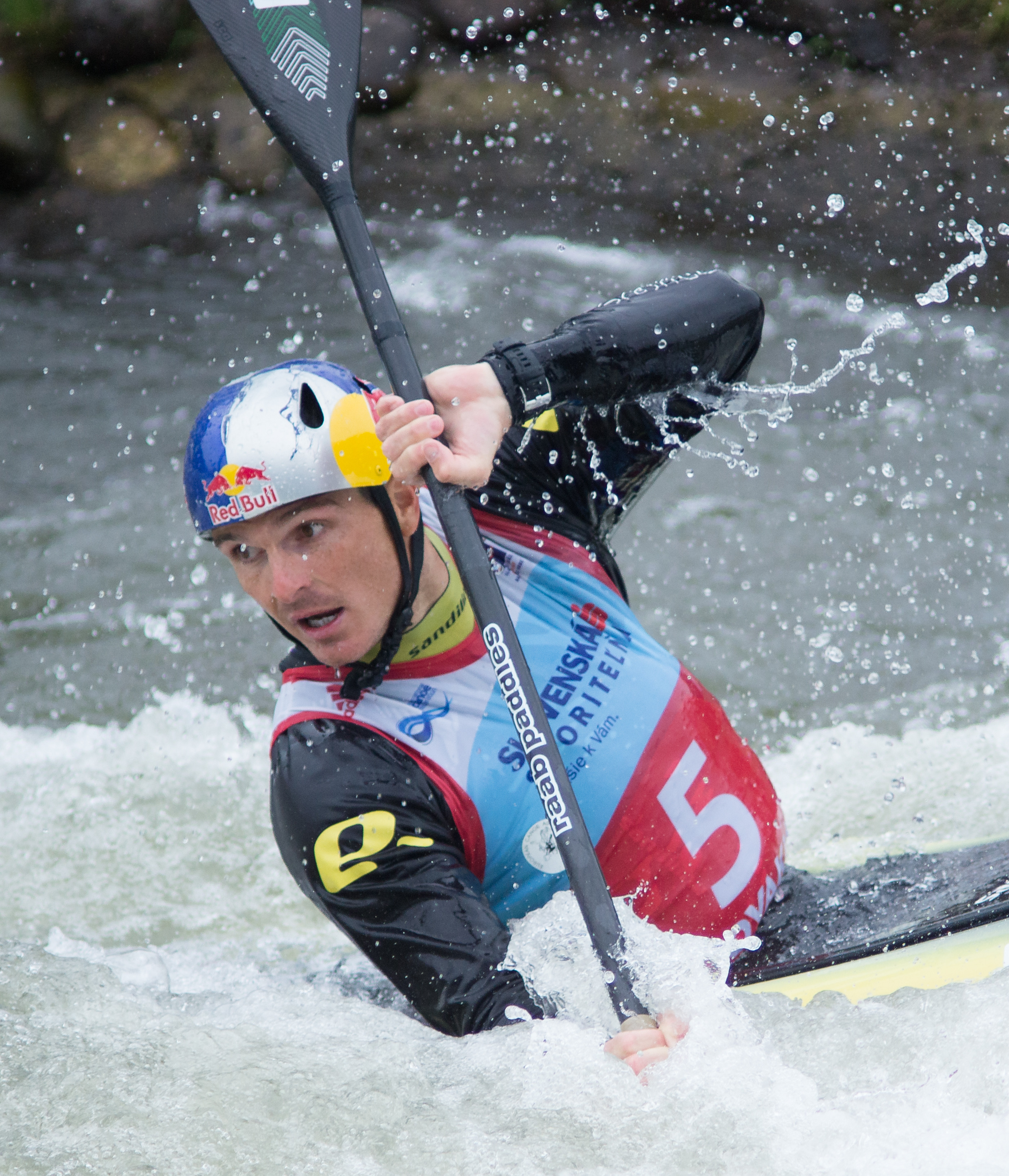
Kauzer at the 2016 European Canoe Slalom Championships

Kauzer has competed at five Summer Olympics. He finished 13th in the K1 event at the 2008 Summer Olympics in Beijing after being eliminated in the semi-finals. Four years later at the London games he was one of the top favorites for gold in the K1 event. He made the final after recording the fastest time in the semi-final, but after a disappointing run in the final he could only finish in sixth place. He was also the Slovenian flag-bearer at the London games. He won his first Olympic medal, a silver in the K1 event, at the 2016 Summer Olympics in Rio de Janeiro. He then finished 12th in the K1 event at the 2020 Summer Olympics in Tokyo after being eliminated in the semi-final. He also competed at the 2024 Summer Olympics in Paris, finishing 18th in the K1 event and 24th in kayak cross.

He won seven medals at the ICF Canoe Slalom World Championships with three golds (K1: 2009, 2011; K1 team: 2026) and four bronzes (K1: 2017; K1 team: 2005, 2017, 2021).

Kauzer won the overall World Cup title in 2009, 2011 and 2015 in K1.

At the European Championships he has won a total of 13 medals (6 golds, 4 silvers and 3 bronzes). Kauzer finished the 2009 season as the World No. 1 in the K1 event.

== World Cup individual podiums ==
	1st place, gold medalist(s)	2nd place, silver medalist(s)	3rd place, bronze medalist(s)	Total
K1	13	7	9	29

Season	Date	Venue	Position	Event
2005	26 June 2005	Tacen	2nd	K1^{1}
2005	10 July 2005	Athens	3rd	K1
2006	11 June 2006	La Seu d'Urgell	1st	K1
2008	29 June 2008	Tacen	1st	K1
2009	28 June 2009	Pau	1st	K1
2009	11 July 2009	Augsburg	1st	K1
2009	3 August 2009	Kananaskis	2nd	K1^{2}
2010	27 June 2010	La Seu d'Urgell	3rd	K1
2011	25 June 2011	Tacen	1st	K1
2011	2 July 2011	L'Argentière-la-Bessée	1st	K1
2011	13 August 2011	Prague	3rd	K1
2013	17 August 2013	Tacen	1st	K1
2013	24 August 2013	Bratislava	2nd	K1
2015	4 July 2015	Liptovský Mikuláš	3rd	K1
2015	15 August 2015	Pau	1st	K1
2016	11 June 2016	La Seu d'Urgell	3rd	K1
2016	10 September 2016	Tacen	1st	K1
2017	2 September 2017	Ivrea	3rd	K1
2017	9 September 2017	La Seu d'Urgell	1st	K1
2018	1 July 2018	Kraków	2nd	K1
2018	8 July 2018	Augsburg	1st	K1
2019	30 June 2019	Tacen	2nd	K1
2020	17 October 2020	Tacen	2nd	K1
2021	4 September 2021	La Seu d'Urgell	3rd	K1
2021	11 September 2021	Pau	2nd	K1
2022	11 June 2022	Prague	1st	K1
2023	2 September 2023	La Seu d'Urgell	1st	K1
2024	31 May 2024	Augsburg	3rd	K1
2024	14 September 2024	Ivrea	3rd	K1

^{1} European Championship counting for World Cup points
^{2} Pan American Championship counting for World Cup points

Olympic Games
Preceded by Urška Žolnir	Flagbearer for Slovenia; London 2012	Succeeded by Vasilij Žbogar
