= Margaux Henry =

French canoeist

Personal information
- Nationality: French
- Born: 14 June 1997 (age 29)

Sport
- Country: France
- Sport: Canoe slalom
- Event: C1, K1, Mixed C2
Medal record
Women's canoe slalom
Representing France
World Championships
Gold medal – first place	2017 Pau	Mixed C2
Silver medal – second place	2018 Rio de Janeiro	Mixed C2
U23 World Championships
Silver medal – second place	2019 Kraków	C1 team
U23 European Championships
Gold medal – first place	2019 Liptovský Mikuláš	C1 team
Silver medal – second place	2018 Bratislava	C1 team
Bronze medal – third place	2018 Bratislava	C1
Junior World Championships
Bronze medal – third place	2014 Penrith	K1 team

Margaux Henry (born 14 June 1997) is a French slalom canoeist who has competed at the international level since 2014.

She won two medals in the Mixed C2 event at the ICF Canoe Slalom World Championships with a gold in 2017 and a silver in 2018. Both with Yves Prigent.

== World Cup individual podiums ==
Season	Date	Venue	Position	Event
2018	23 June 2018	Liptovský Mikuláš	3rd	Mixed C2
2018	1 September 2018	Tacen	2nd	Mixed C2
2018	8 September 2018	La Seu d'Urgell	2nd	Mixed C2
