= 2020 Canoe Slalom World Cup =

The 2020 Canoe Slalom World Cup was a series of multiple races in several canoeing and kayaking categories organized by the International Canoe Federation (ICF). It was the 33rd edition.

Only 2 out of the 5 rounds were held due to the COVID-19 pandemic and no overall winners were declared by the ICF.

== Calendar ==
The series was originally scheduled to start in Ivrea, Italy, but all of the races were either canceled or postponed.

Label	Venue	Original date	New date
World Cup Race 1	(Italy) Ivrea	5-7 June	Canceled
World Cup Race 1	(Slovenia) Tacen	None, replaces Markkleeberg	16-18 October
World Cup Race 2	(France) Pau	12-14 June	6-8 November
World Cup Race 3	(Slovakia) Liptovský Mikuláš	21-23 August	Canceled
World Cup Race 4	(Czech Republic) Prague	18-20 September	Canceled
World Cup Final & Non-Olympic World Championships	(Germany) Markkleeberg	24-27 September	Canceled

== Results ==
=== World Cup Race 1 ===
16-18 October in Tacen, Slovenia. The races were contested by a depleted start list with several of the leading nations not participating.

Event	Gold	Score	Silver	Score	Bronze	Score
C1 men	Luka Božič (SLO)	78.17	Nicolas Gestin (FRA)	79.81	Jules Bernardet (FRA)	80.24
C1 women	Ana Sátila (BRA)	93.64	Lucie Prioux (FRA)	95.37	Evy Leibfarth (USA)	96.76
K1 men	Isak Öhrström (SWE)	73.39	Peter Kauzer (SLO)	73.89	Pedro Gonçalves (BRA)	74.32
K1 women	Romane Prigent (FRA)	83.98	Camille Prigent (FRA)	85.86	Evy Leibfarth (USA)	85.99
Extreme K1 men	Pedro Gonçalves (BRA)		Martin Stanovský (KAZ)		Tren Long (USA)	
Extreme K1 women	Alsu Minazova (RUS)		Daria Kuznetsova (RUS)		Ria Sribar (USA)	

=== World Cup Race 2 ===
6-8 November in Pau, France. Once again the races were contested by a depleted start list with several of the leading nations not participating.

Event	Gold	Score	Silver	Score	Bronze	Score
C1 men	Liam Jegou (IRL)	100.35	Václav Chaloupka (CZE)	101.08	Thomas Koechlin (SUI)	101.96
C1 women	Ana Sátila (BRA)	115.39	Viktoriia Us (UKR)	121.64	Tereza Kneblová (CZE)	122.15
K1 men	Martin Dougoud (SUI)	95.11	Tomáš Zima (CZE)	95.85	Thomas Bersinger (ARG)	98.77
K1 women	Marie-Zélia Lafont (FRA)	106.57	Romane Prigent (FRA)	110.55	Viktoriia Us (UKR)	111.92
Extreme K1 men	Pavel Eigel (RUS)		Benjamin Renia (FRA)		Dario Cuesta (ESP)	
Extreme K1 women	Veronika Vojtová (CZE)		Léa Baldoni (CAN)		Sofía Reinoso (MEX)	
