= Yves Prigent =

French slalom canoeist (born 1993)

Personal information
- Nationality: French
- Born: 30 August 1993 (age 32)
- Height: 1.82 m (6 ft 0 in)
- Weight: 67 kg (148 lb)

Sport
- Country: France
- Sport: Canoe slalom
- Event: C2, Mixed C2
- Club: Cesson Rennes Canoe Kayak
Medal record
Men's canoe slalom
Representing France
World Championships
Gold medal – first place	2015 London	C2 team
Gold medal – first place	2017 Pau	Mixed C2
Silver medal – second place	2018 Rio de Janeiro	Mixed C2
U23 World Championships
Bronze medal – third place	2013 Liptovský Mikuláš	C2 team
Bronze medal – third place	2016 Kraków	C2
U23 European Championships
Gold medal – first place	2014 Skopje	C2 team
Junior European Championships
Silver medal – second place	2011 Banja Luka	C2

Yves Prigent (born 30 August 1993) is a retired French slalom canoeist who competed at the international level from 2011 to 2018, specializing in the C2 event.

He won three medals at the ICF Canoe Slalom World Championships with two golds (Mixed C2: 2017, C2 team: 2015) and a silver (Mixed C2: 2018).

His partner in the men's C2 boat was Loïc Kervella. His partner in the mixed C2 boat is Margaux Henry.

His father Jean-Yves is a former slalom canoeist and medalist from World Championships. His younger sister Camille is also a slalom canoeist. His cousin Lily Ramonatxo is a successful rhythmic gymnast.

== World Cup individual podiums ==
Season	Date	Venue	Position	Event
2015	16 August 2015	Pau	3rd	C2
2018	23 June 2018	Liptovský Mikuláš	3rd	Mixed C2
2018	1 September 2018	Tacen	2nd	Mixed C2
2018	8 September 2018	La Seu d'Urgell	2nd	Mixed C2
