= Jiří Prskavec (canoeist, born 1993) =

Czech slalom canoeist (born 1993)

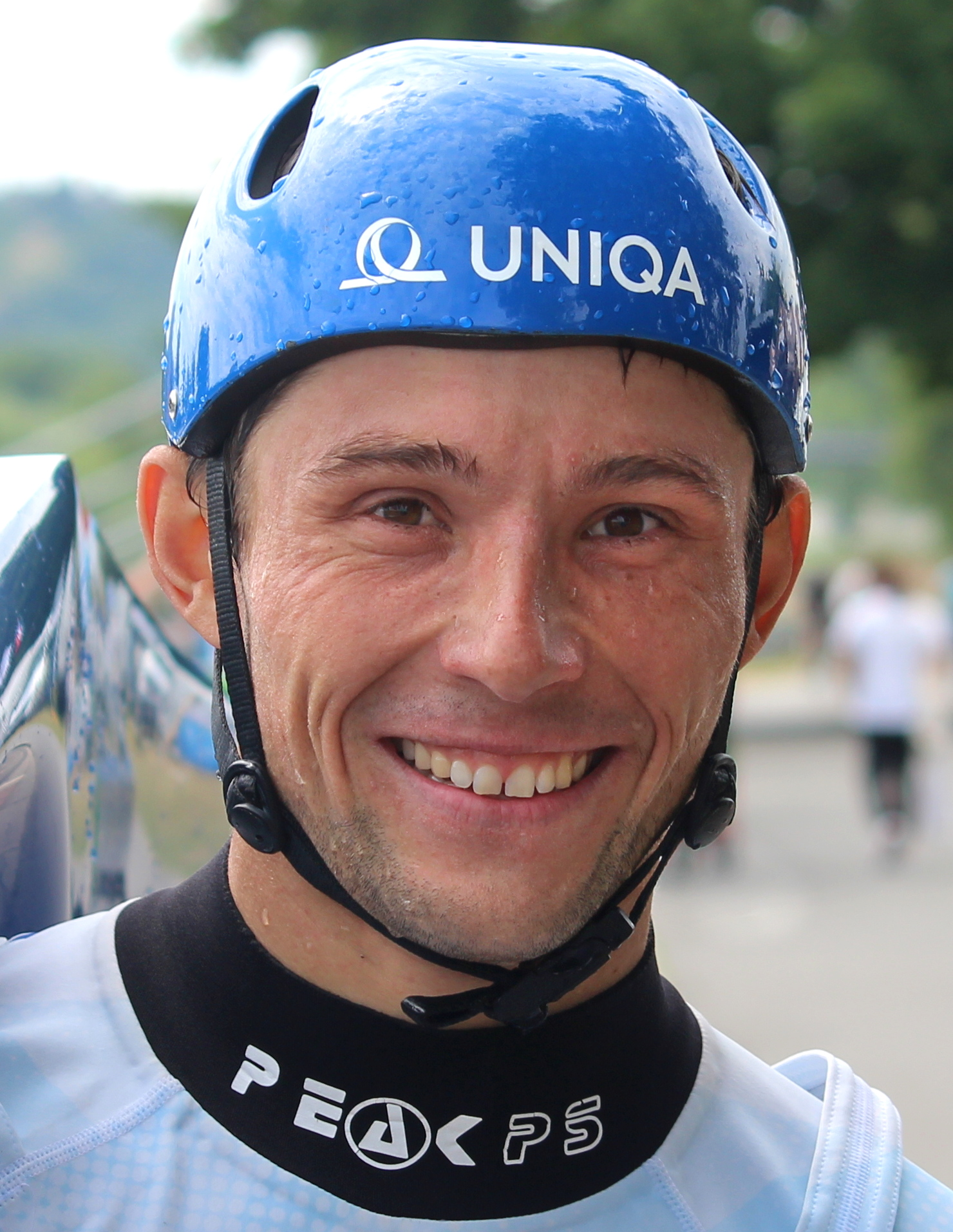
- Prskavec in 2023

Personal information
- Nationality: Czech
- Born: 18 May 1993 (age 33) Mělník, Czech Republic
- Height: 173 cm (5 ft 8 in)
- Weight: 69 kg (152 lb)

Sport
- Country: Czech Republic
- Sport: Canoe slalom
- Event: K1, C1, Kayak cross
- Club: USK Praha

Achievements and titles
- Highest world ranking: No. 1 (2016)
Medal record
Representing the Czech Republic
Event	1st	2nd	3rd
Olympic Games	1	0	1
World Championships	5	5	2
European Championships	15	3	3
Youth Olympic Games	0	0	1
U23 World Championships	3	1	2
U23 European Championships	1	1	1
Junior World Championships	0	0	1
Junior European Championships	2	1	0
Total	27	11	11
Olympic Games
Gold medal – first place	2020 Tokyo	K1
Bronze medal – third place	2016 Rio de Janeiro	K1
World Championships
Gold medal – first place	2015 London	K1
Gold medal – first place	2015 London	K1 team
Gold medal – first place	2017 Pau	K1 team
Gold medal – first place	2019 La Seu d'Urgell	K1
Gold medal – first place	2023 London	K1 team
Silver medal – second place	2013 Prague	K1
Silver medal – second place	2014 Deep Creek Lake	K1 team
Silver medal – second place	2018 Rio de Janeiro	K1
Silver medal – second place	2019 La Seu d'Urgell	K1 team
Silver medal – second place	2023 London	K1
Bronze medal – third place	2018 Rio de Janeiro	K1 team
Bronze medal – third place	2025 Penrith	K1
European Games
Gold medal – first place	2023 Kraków	K1
European Championships
Gold medal – first place	2013 Kraków	K1
Gold medal – first place	2013 Kraków	K1 team
Gold medal – first place	2014 Vienna	K1
Gold medal – first place	2016 Liptovský Mikuláš	K1
Gold medal – first place	2016 Liptovský Mikuláš	K1 team
Gold medal – first place	2017 Tacen	K1 team
Gold medal – first place	2018 Prague	K1 team
Gold medal – first place	2019 Pau	K1 team
Gold medal – first place	2020 Prague	K1
Gold medal – first place	2021 Ivrea	K1 team
Gold medal – first place	2022 Liptovský Mikuláš	K1
Gold medal – first place	2022 Liptovský Mikuláš	K1 team
Gold medal – first place	2024 Tacen	K1 team
Gold medal – first place	2025 Vaires-sur-Marne	K1
Silver medal – second place	2020 Prague	K1 team
Silver medal – second place	2024 Tacen	C1 team
Silver medal – second place	2026 Ivrea	K1 team
Bronze medal – third place	2011 La Seu d'Urgell	K1
Bronze medal – third place	2017 Tacen	K1
Bronze medal – third place	2018 Prague	K1
Youth Olympic Games
Bronze medal – third place	2010 Singapore	K1
U23 World Championships
Gold medal – first place	2012 Wausau	K1
Gold medal – first place	2015 Foz do Iguaçu	K1
Gold medal – first place	2015 Foz do Iguaçu	K1 team
Silver medal – second place	2013 Liptovský Mikuláš	K1
Bronze medal – third place	2012 Wausau	K1 team
Bronze medal – third place	2014 Penrith	K1
U23 European Championships
Gold medal – first place	2015 Kraków	K1
Silver medal – second place	2012 Solkan	K1 team
Bronze medal – third place	2014 Skopje	K1
Junior World Championships
Bronze medal – third place	2010 Foix	K1 team
Junior European Championships
Gold medal – first place	2010 Markkleeberg	K1
Gold medal – first place	2010 Markkleeberg	K1 team
Silver medal – second place	2011 Banja Luka	K1

Jiří Prskavec (Czech pronunciation: [ˈjɪr̝iː ˈpr̩skavɛts]; born 18 May 1993) is a Czech slalom canoeist who has competed at the international level since 2008, specializing in the K1 discipline. In 2023 he also started competing in C1. He also occasionally appears in kayak cross. With an Olympic gold and a bronze, 2 individual world titles and 5 individual European titles, he is one of the most successful K1 paddlers of his generation.

== Career ==
Prskavec competed at three Olympic games. In his first appearance he won a bronze medal in the K1 event at the 2016 Summer Olympics in Rio de Janeiro after touching one gate in the final. He then won gold in the K1 event at the delayed 2020 Summer Olympics in Tokyo. He also competed at the 2024 Summer Olympics in Paris, finishing 8th in the K1 event and 11th in kayak cross.

Prskavec won 12 medals at the ICF Canoe Slalom World Championships including six individual medals. He won gold in the K1 event in 2015 in London and then again in 2019 in La Seu d'Urgell. He also has three silvers (2013, 2018 and 2023) and one bronze (2025) in the K1 event. The other six medals came from the K1 team events as part of the Czech team. These include three golds (2015, 2017, 2023), two silvers (2014, 2019) and a bronze (2018)

Prskavec also won 21 medals (15 golds, 3 silver and 3 bronzes) at the European Championships. Ten of these medals are individual (7 golds and 3 bronzes), including a gold medal in the K1 event at the 2023 European Games in Kraków.

Prskavec won the overall World Cup title in the K1 class a total of three times (2018, 2019 and 2022). He finished the 2016, 2019-2021 and 2023 seasons as the World No. 1.

Prskavec started competing in the C1 discipline in 2023 and had immediate success. Just qualifying for the strong Czech national team was already considered an achievement. He then shocked the canoeing world by winning bronze in his first ever international C1 appearance at a World Cup in Augsburg.

Prskavec competed at the 2010 Summer Youth Olympics where he won bronze in the K1 slalom event.

== Personal life ==
His father Jiří is a former slalom canoeist and a medalist from World and European Championships.

== Career statistics ==
=== Major championships results timeline ===
Event		2011	2012	2013	2014	2015	2016	2017	2018	2019	2020	2021	2022	2023	2024	2025	2026
Olympic Games	K1	Not held	—	Not held			3	Not held				1	Not held		8	Not held	
Olympic Games	Kayak cross	Not held													11	Not held	
World Championships	C1	—	Not held	—	—	—	Not held	—	—	—	Not held	—	—	31	Not held	19	—
World Championships	K1	10	Not held	2	18	1	Not held	19	2	1	Not held	11	5	2	Not held	3	14
World Championships	Kayak cross	Not held						—	—	—	Not held	42	87	—	Not held	—	—
World Championships	C1 team	—	Not held	—	—	—	Not held	—	—	—	Not held	—	—	7	Not held	8	—
World Championships	K1 team	5	Not held	4	2	1	Not held	1	3	2	Not held	4	4	1	Not held	7	6
European Championships	C1	—	—	—	—	—	—	—	—	—	—	—	—	4 (Note: 2023 European Games)	6	13	—
European Championships	K1	3	—	1	1	6	1	3	3	8	1	7	1	1	9	1	4
European Championships	C1 team	—	—	—	—	—	—	—	—	—	—	—	—	6	2	8	—
European Championships	K1 team	5	—	1	4	9	1	1	1	1	2	1	1	14	1	8	2

=== World Cup individual podiums ===
	1st place, gold medalist(s)	2nd place, silver medalist(s)	3rd place, bronze medalist(s)	Total
C1	1	0	1	2
K1	9	5	7	21
Total	10	5	8	23

Season	Date	Venue	Position	Event
2014	21 June 2014	Prague	2nd	K1
2015	20 June 2015	Prague	1st	K1
2016	3 September 2016	Prague	1st	K1
2017	17 June 2017	Prague	2nd	K1
2017	24 June 2017	Augsburg	3rd	K1
2017	9 September 2017	La Seu d'Urgell	3rd	K1
2018	1 July 2018	Kraków	3rd	K1
2018	8 July 2018	Augsburg	2nd	K1
2018	31 August 2018	Tacen	2nd	K1
2018	9 September 2018	La Seu d'Urgell	3rd	K1
2019	16 June 2019	Lee Valley	2nd	K1
2019	30 June 2019	Tacen	3rd	K1
2019	1 September 2019	Markkleeberg	3rd	K1
2019	8 September 2019	Prague	1st	K1
2021	12 June 2021	Prague	1st	K1
2022	18 June 2022	Kraków	3rd	K1
2022	25 June 2022	Tacen	1st	K1
2022	3 September 2022	La Seu d'Urgell	1st	K1
2023	3 June 2023	Augsburg	3rd	C1
2023	9 June 2023	Prague	1st	K1
2023	17 June 2023	Tacen	1st	K1
2024	8 June 2024	Prague	1st	C1
2024	20 September 2024	La Seu d'Urgell	1st	K1

=== Complete World Cup results ===
Year	WC1	WC2	WC3	WC4	WC5	Points	Position
2008	Continent (Australia); 19	Prague (Czech Republic)	Tacen (Slovenia)	Augsburg (Germany)		24	93rd
2010	Continent (Australia); 23	Prague (Czech Republic)	La Seu (Spain)	Augsburg (Germany)		20	81st
2011	Tacen (Slovenia); 14	L'Argentière (France); 6	Markkleeberg (Germany)	Prague (Czech Republic); 6		115	8th
2012	Cardiff (United Kingdom)	Pau (France)	La Seu (Spain)	Prague (Czech Republic)	Bratislava (Slovakia); 55	2	100th
2013	Cardiff (United Kingdom); 5	Augsburg (Germany); 6	La Seu (Spain); 37	Tacen (Slovenia)	Bratislava (Slovakia)	93	17th
2014	Lee Valley (United Kingdom); 13	Tacen (Slovenia); 32	Prague (Czech Republic); 2	La Seu (Spain); 11	Augsburg (Germany); 19	186	6th
2015	Prague (Czech Republic); 1	Kraków (Poland); 15	Liptovský Mikuláš (Slovakia); 15	La Seu (Spain)	Pau (France)	120	22nd
2016	Ivrea (Italy)	La Seu (Spain)	Pau (France)	Prague (Czech Republic); 1	Tacen (Slovenia)	60	42nd
2017	Prague (Czech Republic); 2	Augsburg (Germany); 3	Markkleeberg (Germany); 6	Ivrea (Italy)	La Seu (Spain); 3	247	4th
2018	Liptovský Mikuláš (Slovakia); 4	Kraków (Poland); 3	Augsburg (Germany); 2	Tacen (Slovenia); 2	La Seu (Spain); 3	304	1st
2019	Lee Valley (United Kingdom); 2	Bratislava (Slovakia); 4	Tacen (Slovenia); 3	Markkleeberg (Germany); 3	Prague (Czech Republic); 1	319	1st
2021	Prague (Czech Republic); 1	Markkleeberg (Germany)	La Seu (Spain)	Pau (France)	–	60	34th
2022	Prague (Czech Republic); 4	Kraków (Poland); 3	Tacen (Slovenia); 1	Pau (France); 5	La Seu (Spain); 1	317	1st
2023 K1	Augsburg (Germany); 5	Prague (Czech Republic); 1	Tacen (Slovenia); 1	La Seu (Spain); 28	Paris (France); 7	252	3rd
C1	3	9	17	17	5	222	5th
