= Alexander Slafkovský =

Slovak slalom canoeist (born 1983)

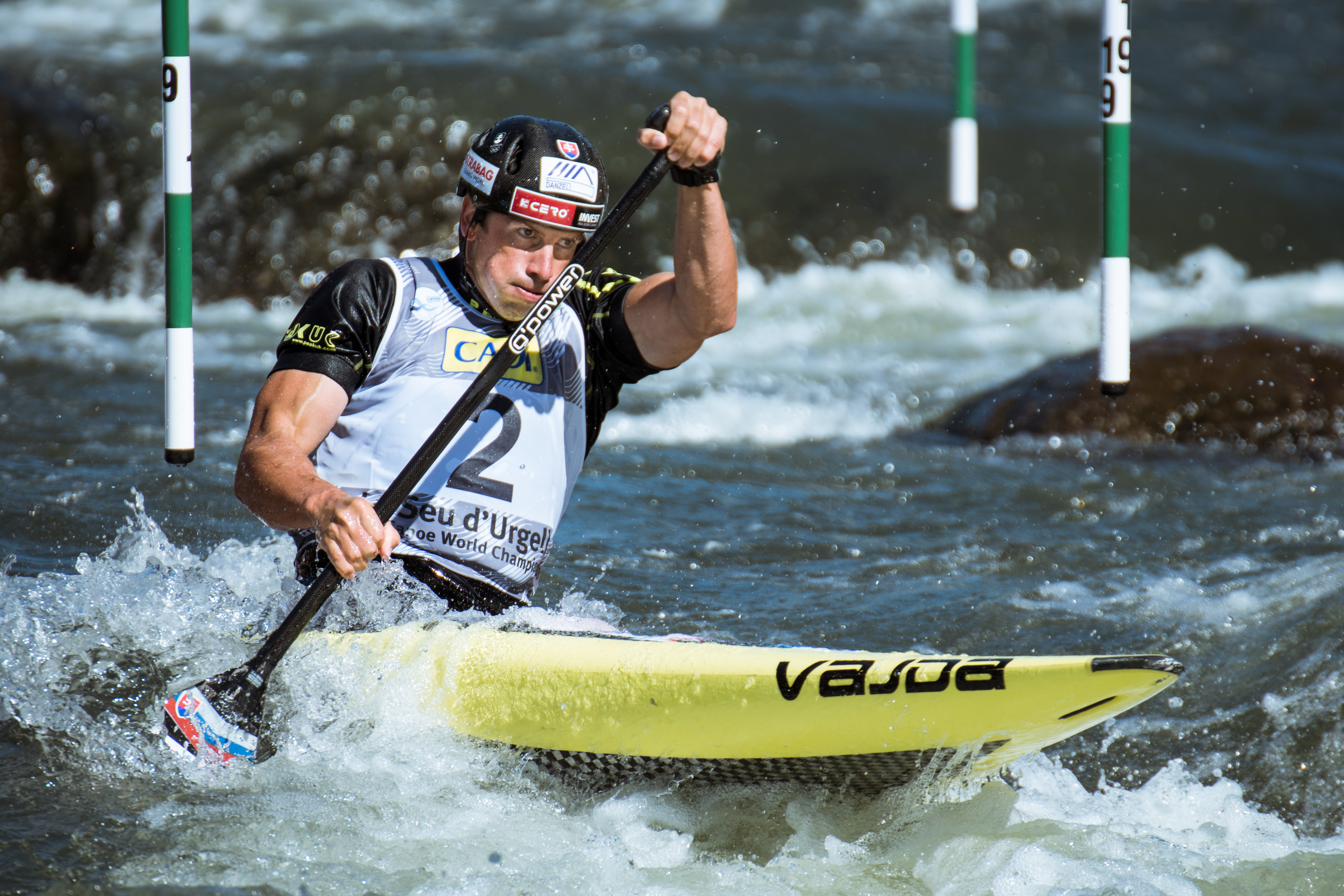
- Slafkovský in 2019

Personal information
- Nationality: Slovak
- Born: 11 March 1983 (age 43) Liptovský Mikuláš, Slovakia
- Years active: 1998 - 2023
- Height: 1.84 m (6 ft 0 in)
- Weight: 80 kg (176 lb)

Sport
- Country: Slovakia
- Sport: Canoe slalom
- Event: C1
- Club: Kanoe Tatra Klub/ASC Dukla
Medal record
Men's canoe slalom
Representing Slovakia
Event	1st	2nd	3rd
World Championships	10	5	1
European Championships	12	7	3
U23 European Championships	1	1	1
Junior World Championships	1	1	0
Junior European Championships	1	1	1
Total	25	15	6
World Championships
Gold medal – first place	2003 Augsburg	C1 team
Gold medal – first place	2009 La Seu d'Urgell	C1 team
Gold medal – first place	2010 Tacen	C1 team
Gold medal – first place	2011 Bratislava	C1 team
Gold medal – first place	2013 Prague	C1 team
Gold medal – first place	2014 Deep Creek Lake	C1 team
Gold medal – first place	2015 London	C1 team
Gold medal – first place	2017 Pau	C1 team
Gold medal – first place	2018 Rio de Janeiro	C1 team
Gold medal – first place	2019 La Seu d'Urgell	C1 team
Silver medal – second place	2013 Prague	C1
Silver medal – second place	2017 Pau	C1
Silver medal – second place	2021 Bratislava	C1
Silver medal – second place	2022 Augsburg	C1
Silver medal – second place	2022 Augsburg	C1 team
Bronze medal – third place	2021 Bratislava	C1 team
European Games
Silver medal – second place	2023 Kraków	C1 team
European Championships
Gold medal – first place	2002 Bratislava	C1 team
Gold medal – first place	2005 Tacen	C1 team
Gold medal – first place	2008 Kraków	C1 team
Gold medal – first place	2010 Bratislava	C1 team
Gold medal – first place	2012 Augsburg	C1 team
Gold medal – first place	2013 Kraków	C1 team
Gold medal – first place	2014 Vienna	C1
Gold medal – first place	2015 Markkleeberg	C1 team
Gold medal – first place	2016 Liptovský Mikuláš	C1
Gold medal – first place	2016 Liptovský Mikuláš	C1 team
Gold medal – first place	2017 Tacen	C1
Gold medal – first place	2021 Ivrea	C1 team
Silver medal – second place	2004 Skopje	C1 team
Silver medal – second place	2005 Tacen	C1
Silver medal – second place	2006 L'Argentière	C1 team
Silver medal – second place	2009 Nottingham	C1
Silver medal – second place	2011 La Seu d'Urgell	C1
Silver medal – second place	2018 Prague	C1 team
Bronze medal – third place	2008 Kraków	C1
Bronze medal – third place	2010 Bratislava	C1
Bronze medal – third place	2014 Vienna	C1 team
U23 European Championships
Gold medal – first place	2006 Nottingham	C1
Silver medal – second place	2002 Bratislava	C1
Bronze medal – third place	2005 Kraków	C1
Junior World Championships
Gold medal – first place	2000 Bratislava	C1
Silver medal – second place	1998 Lofer	C1
Junior European Championships
Gold medal – first place	2001 Bratislava	C1
Silver medal – second place	1999 Solkan	C1
Bronze medal – third place	2001 Bratislava	C1 team

Alexander Slafkovský (born 11 March 1983) is a former Slovak slalom canoeist who competed at the international level from 1998 to 2023, specializing in the C1 event.

Slafkovský won 15 medals at the ICF Canoe Slalom World Championships with ten golds (C1 team: 2003, 2009, 2010, 2011, 2013, 2014, 2015, 2017, 2018, 2019), five silvers (C1: 2013, 2017, 2021, 2022, C1 team: 2022) and one bronze (C1 team: 2021).

At the European Championships he won a total of 22 medals (12 golds, 7 silvers and 3 bronzes), including a silver in the C1 team event at the 2023 European Games in Kraków. Slafkovský also won the overall World Cup title in the C1 class in 2012, 2016 and 2018. He finished the 2017 season as the World No. 1 in the C1 event.

In spite of being one of the top C1 paddlers of his generation, he has never competed at the Olympic Games, where during his career only one boat per country has been allowed to race in each discipline. First he was denied qualification by Michal Martikán in 2004. Due to an injury sustained while skiing, he missed most of the 2007 season, which prevented him from competing for a spot at the 2008 Games. He lost to Martikán again in the internal fight for the 2012 games and then to Matej Beňuš in the three subsequent cycles (2016, 2020 and 2024).

Slafkovský announced his retirement from the sport in 2024.

== Personal life ==
His father, who is also named Alexander, is a former mayor of Liptovský Mikuláš and his second cousin Juraj Slafkovský is an ice hockey player.

== Career statistics ==
=== Major championships results timeline ===
Event		1999	2000	2001	2002	2003	2004	2005	2006	2007	2008	2009	2010	2011
World Championships	C1	35	Not held		39	25	Not held	12	16	—	Not held	10	5	12
World Championships	C1 team	—	Not held		4	1	Not held	—	4	—	Not held	1	1	1
European Championships	C1	Not held	14	Not held	—	Not held	14	2	9	—	3	2	3	2
European Championships	C1 team	Not held	—	Not held	1	Not held	2	1	2	—	1	8	1	4

Event		2012	2013	2014	2015	2016	2017	2018	2019	2020	2021	2022	2023
World Championships	C1	Not held	2	7	5	Not held	2	5	4	Not held	2	2	12
World Championships	C1 team	Not held	1	1	1	Not held	1	1	1	Not held	3	2	5
European Championships	C1	4	20	1	6	1	1	4	—	—	16	13	20 (Note: 2023 European Games)
European Championships	C1 team	1	1	3	1	1	6	2	—	—	1	4	2

=== World Cup individual podiums ===
	1st place, gold medalist(s)	2nd place, silver medalist(s)	3rd place, bronze medalist(s)	Total
C1	8	13	7	28

Season	Date	Venue	Position	Event
2004	23 May 2004	La Seu d'Urgell	3rd	C1
2005	26 June 2005	Tacen	2nd	C1^{1}
2008	16 March 2008	Penrith	3rd	C1^{2}
2008	29 June 2008	Tacen	2nd	C1
2009	28 June 2009	Pau	2nd	C1
2009	5 July 2009	Bratislava	2nd	C1
2010	19 June 2010	Prague	3rd	C1
2011	25 June 2011	Tacen	3rd	C1
2011	13 August 2011	Prague	1st	C1
2012	9 June 2012	Cardiff	3rd	C1
2012	16 June 2012	Pau	3rd	C1
2012	25 August 2012	Prague	2nd	C1
2012	1 September 2012	Bratislava	1st	C1
2013	29 June 2013	Augsburg	1st	C1
2014	2 August 2014	La Seu d'Urgell	1st	C1
2015	4 July 2015	Liptovský Mikuláš	2nd	C1
2016	11 June 2016	La Seu d'Urgell	1st	C1
2016	18 June 2016	Pau	1st	C1
2016	10 September 2016	Tacen	2nd	C1
2017	3 September 2017	Ivrea	2nd	C1
2017	10 September 2017	La Seu d'Urgell	2nd	C1
2018	23 June 2018	Liptovský Mikuláš	2nd	C1
2018	30 June 2018	Kraków	2nd	C1
2018	7 July 2018	Augsburg	2nd	C1
2018	1 September 2018	Tacen	2nd	C1
2019	29 June 2019	Tacen	3rd	C1
2019	31 August 2019	Markkleeberg	1st	C1
2022	26 June 2022	Tacen	1st	C1

^{1} European Championship counting for World Cup points
^{2} Oceania Championship counting for World Cup points
