= 2017 ICF Canoe Slalom World Championships =

ICF Canoe world Championships

The 2017 ICF Canoe Slalom World Championships was the 38th edition of the ICF Canoe Slalom World Championships. The event took place from 22 September to 1 October 2017 in Pau, France under the auspices of International Canoe Federation (ICF) at the Pau-Pyrénées Whitewater Stadium. Pau was also hosting the Wildwater Canoeing World Championships as part of the same event.

The Mixed C2 event returned to the world's program for the first time since 1981. The men's C2 team event was not a world championship event due to only 4 countries participating. A non-olympic event must have participants from at least 6 countries to be counted as a world championship.

A brand new medal event was the Extreme K1 which has been part of the World Cup program since 2016.

== Schedule ==
13 events were held.

All times listed are UTC+2.

| Date | Starting Time | Events |
|---|---|---|
| 26 September | 09:00 | C1M, K1W, K1M, C1W, C2M teams |
| 27 September | 09:15 | C2M, C1W, K1M heats – 1st run |
| 27 September | 12:50 | C2M, C1W, K1M heats – 2nd run |
| 28 September | 09:15 | K1W, C1M heats – 1st run |
| 28 September | 12:00 | C2Mx semifinal |
| 28 September | 12:15 | K1W, C1M heats – 2nd run |
| 28 September | 14:25 | C2Mx final |
| 29 September | 12:05 | C2M, C1W, K1M semifinals |
| 29 September | 16:35 | C2M, C1W, K1M finals |
| 30 September | 10:30 | K1W, C1M semifinals |
| 30 September | 15:10 | K1W, C1M finals |
| 1 October | 10:30 | Extreme K1M, Extreme K1W time trials |
| 1 October | 12:45 | Extreme K1M, Extreme K1W 1/8 finals |
| 1 October | 15:35 | Extreme K1M, Extreme K1W 1/4 finals, 1/2 finals and finals |

== Medal summary ==
=== Medal table ===
| Rank | Nation | Gold | Silver | Bronze | Total |
|---|---|---|---|---|---|
| 1 | Czech Republic (CZE) | 3 | 2 | 3 | 8 |
| 2 | France (FRA) | 2 | 2 | 1 | 5 |
| 3 | Great Britain (GBR) | 2 | 1 | 0 | 3 |
| 4 | Germany (GER) | 2 | 0 | 2 | 4 |
| 5 | Slovakia (SVK) | 1 | 3 | 1 | 5 |
| 6 | Australia (AUS) | 1 | 1 | 1 | 3 |
| 7 | Slovenia (SLO) | 1 | 0 | 2 | 3 |
| 8 | Brazil (BRA) | 0 | 1 | 1 | 2 |
| 9 | Austria (AUT) | 0 | 1 | 0 | 1 |
| 9 | Italy (ITA) | 0 | 1 | 0 | 1 |
| 11 | New Zealand (NZL) | 0 | 0 | 1 | 1 |
| Totals (11 entries) | | 12 | 12 | 12 | 36 |

=== Men ===
==== Canoe ====
| Event | Gold | | Silver | | Bronze | |
|---|---|---|---|---|---|---|
| C1 | Benjamin Savšek; Slovenia | 94.81 | Alexander Slafkovský; Slovakia | 96.29 | Michal Martikán; Slovakia | 98.23 |
| C1 team | Slovakia; Matej Beňuš; Alexander Slafkovský; Michal Martikán | 95.44 | Great Britain; Ryan Westley; David Florence; Adam Burgess | 98.44 | France; Denis Gargaud Chanut; Martin Thomas; Edern Le Ruyet | 98.72 |
| C2 | France; Gauthier Klauss; Matthieu Péché | 105.30 | Slovakia; Ladislav Škantár; Peter Škantár | 105.37 | Germany; Robert Behling; Thomas Becker | 106.15 |
| C2 team (non-medal event) | France; Gauthier Klauss/Matthieu Péché; Nicolas Scianimanico/Hugo Cailhol; Pierre Picco/Hugo Biso | 104.99 | Germany; Robert Behling/Thomas Becker; Kai Müller/Kevin Müller; Franz Anton/Jan Benzien | 106.80 | Slovakia; Ladislav Škantár/Peter Škantár; Tomáš Kučera/Ján Bátik; Pavol Hochschorner/Peter Hochschorner | 108.16 |

==== Kayak ====
| Event | Gold | | Silver | | Bronze | |
|---|---|---|---|---|---|---|
| K1 | Ondřej Tunka; Czech Republic | 91.84 | Vít Přindiš; Czech Republic | 91.86 | Peter Kauzer; Slovenia | 92.13 |
| K1 team | Czech Republic; Jiří Prskavec; Ondřej Tunka; Vít Přindiš | 93.06 | France; Boris Neveu; Mathieu Biazizzo; Sébastien Combot | 94.07 | Slovenia; Peter Kauzer; Martin Srabotnik; Žan Jakše | 94.41 |
| Extreme K1 | Vavřinec Hradilek; Czech Republic | | Boris Neveu; France | | Mike Dawson; New Zealand | |

=== Women ===
==== Canoe ====
| Event | Gold | | Silver | | Bronze | |
|---|---|---|---|---|---|---|
| C1 | Mallory Franklin; Great Britain | 109.09 | Tereza Fišerová; Czech Republic | 113.21 | Ana Sátila; Brazil | 114.29 |
| C1 team | Great Britain; Mallory Franklin; Kimberley Woods; Eilidh Gibson | 117.63 | Australia; Jessica Fox; Noemie Fox; Rosalyn Lawrence | 119.28 | Czech Republic; Tereza Fišerová; Monika Jančová; Eva Říhová | 122.75 |

==== Kayak ====
| Event | Gold | | Silver | | Bronze | |
|---|---|---|---|---|---|---|
| K1 | Jessica Fox; Australia | 97.14 | Jana Dukátová; Slovakia | 101.76 | Ricarda Funk; Germany | 102.62 |
| K1 team | Germany; Jasmin Schornberg; Ricarda Funk; Lisa Fritsche | 103.60 | Austria; Corinna Kuhnle; Lisa Leitner; Viktoria Wolffhardt | 103.80 | Australia; Jessica Fox; Rosalyn Lawrence; Kate Eckhardt | 108.44 |
| Extreme K1 | Caroline Trompeter; Germany | | Ana Sátila; Brazil | | Amálie Hilgertová; Czech Republic | |

=== Mixed ===
==== Canoe ====
The Mixed C2 event returned to the world championships after a 36-year absence. 11 crews signed up for the event. There were no heats. Top 10 from the semifinal advanced to the final. The gate setup was the same as for the heats of the other individual events, but different from the setup used for the semifinals and finals of those events.

| Event | Gold | | Silver | | Bronze | |
|---|---|---|---|---|---|---|
| C2 | France; Margaux Henry; Yves Prigent | 105.37 | Italy; Niccolò Ferrari; Stefanie Horn | 106.09 | Czech Republic; Veronika Vojtová; Jan Mašek | 109.06 |

== See also ==
- 2017 Canoe Slalom World Cup
- 2017 Wildwater Canoeing World Championships
