= Thomas Bersinger =

French-born Argentine slalom canoeist

Personal information
- Nationality: Argentine
- Born: 4 December 1985 (age 40) Pau
- Height: 1.70 m (5 ft 7 in)

Sport
- Country: Argentina
- Sport: Canoe slalom
- Event: K1, Extreme K1
- Club: Club Universitaire Pau Canoe Kayak
Medal record
World Championships
Bronze medal – third place	2018 Rio de Janeiro	Extreme K1

Thomas Bersinger (born 4 December 1985 in Pau) is a French-born Argentine slalom canoeist who has competed at the international level since 2013.

He won a bronze medal in the Extreme K1 event at the 2018 ICF Canoe Slalom World Championships in Rio de Janeiro.

== World Cup individual podiums ==
Season	Date	Venue	Position	Event
2018	30 September 2018	Rio de Janeiro	3rd	Extreme K1^{1}
2020	7 November 2020	Pau	3rd	K1

^{1} World Championship counting for World Cup points
