= 2019 ICF Canoe Slalom World Championships =

Canoe slalom event in La Seu d'Urgell, Catalonia, Spain

- Venue: Segre Olympic Park
- Location: La Seu d'Urgell, Catalonia Spain
- Dates: 24–29 September

The 2019 ICF Canoe Slalom World Championships were the 40th edition of the ICF Canoe Slalom World Championships. The event took place from 24 to 29 September 2019 in La Seu d'Urgell, Catalonia, Spain under the auspices of International Canoe Federation (ICF). The events took place at the Segre Olympic Park which also hosted the canoe slalom events at the 1992 Summer Olympics. La Seu d'Urgell hosted the championships for the third time after previously hosting the event in 1999 and 2009.

As is traditional in a pre-Olympic year, the Championships also doubled as the primary qualification event for the 2020 Summer Olympics. The top placed boats (subject to a limit of one per nation) earned their NOCs a qualification quota. 18 qualification spots were available in the K1 events, and eleven in the C1.

Seu also hosted the Wildwater Canoeing World Championships as part of the same event.

== Schedule ==
Nine medal events were contested.

All times listed are UTC+2.

Date	Starting Time	Events
25 September	09:00	C1M, K1W, K1M, C1W teams
26 September	09:00	C1M, K1W heats – 1st run
26 September	12:30	C1M, K1W heats – 2nd run
27 September	09:00	C1W, K1M heats – 1st run
27 September	12:25	C1W, K1M heats – 2nd run
28 September	09:03	C1M, K1W semifinals
28 September	12:03	C1M, K1W finals
29 September	08:33	C1W, K1M semifinals
29 September	12:03	C1W, K1M finals
29 September	15:00	C2Mx semifinal
29 September	16:10	C2Mx final

== Medal summary ==
=== Medal table ===
* Host nation (Spain)

Rank	Nation	Gold	Silver	Bronze	Total
1	Czech Republic (CZE)	2	2	2	6
2	Spain (ESP)*	1	4	1	6
3	Australia (AUS)	1	2	0	3
4	Slovenia (SLO)	1	0	1	2
5	France (FRA)	1	0	0	1
5	Germany (GER)	1	0	0	1
5	Great Britain (GBR)	1	0	0	1
5	Slovakia (SVK)	1	0	0	1
9	Poland (POL)	0	1	1	2
10	Russia (RUS)	0	0	2	2
11	Austria (AUT)	0	0	1	1
11	New Zealand (NZL)	0	0	1	1
Totals (12 entries)		9	9	9	27

=== Men ===
==== Canoe ====
Event	Gold		Silver		Bronze	
C1	Cédric Joly; France	90.84	Ander Elosegi; Spain	91.35	Luka Božič; Slovenia	91.92
C1 team	Slovakia; Alexander Slafkovský; Michal Martikán; Matej Beňuš	94.38	Spain; Ander Elosegi; Miquel Travé; Luis Fernández	97.43	Russia; Kirill Setkin; Dmitrii Khramtsov; Pavel Kotov	98.62

==== Kayak ====
Event	Gold		Silver		Bronze	
K1	Jiří Prskavec; Czech Republic	84.26	David Llorente; Spain	85.96	Joan Crespo; Spain	87.22
K1 team	Spain; David Llorente; Samuel Hernanz; Joan Crespo	89.87	Czech Republic; Jiří Prskavec; Vít Přindiš; Vavřinec Hradilek	90.86	Poland; Dariusz Popiela; Michał Pasiut; Krzysztof Majerczak	93.69

=== Women ===
==== Canoe ====
Event	Gold		Silver		Bronze	
C1	Andrea Herzog; Germany	100.52	Jessica Fox; Australia	101.46	Nadine Weratschnig; Austria	106.45
C1 team	Australia; Jessica Fox; Noemie Fox; Rosalyn Lawrence	117.97	Spain; Núria Vilarrubla; Klara Olazabal; Ainhoa Lameiro	121.72	Czech Republic; Tereza Fišerová; Eva Říhová; Kateřina Havlíčková	124.48

==== Kayak ====
Event	Gold		Silver		Bronze	
K1	Eva Terčelj; Slovenia	94.27	Jessica Fox; Australia	94.69	Luuka Jones; New Zealand	94.77
K1 team	Great Britain; Mallory Franklin; Fiona Pennie; Kimberley Woods	103.96	Czech Republic; Kateřina Kudějová; Veronika Vojtová; Amálie Hilgertová	104.16	Russia; Ekaterina Perova; Marta Kharitonova; Alsu Minazova	104.19

=== Mixed ===
==== Canoe ====
Event	Gold		Silver		Bronze	
C2	Tereza Fišerová; Jakub Jáně; Czech Republic	109.65	Aleksandra Stach; Marcin Pochwała; Poland	113.36	Jan Mašek; Veronika Vojtová; Czech Republic	114.57

== Olympic qualification ==
The 2019 World Championships also served as a main qualification event in each of the individual boat classes. The following nations each qualified a boat in the stated event:

Qualified boats for Tokyo 2020 from the 2019 ICF Canoe Slalom World Championships
Men's K-1 (18)	Men's C-1 (11)	Women's K-1 (18)	Women's C-1 (11)
Czech Republic; Great Britain; Portugal; ROC; Australia; Spain; Slovakia; France; Germany; Canada; Italy; Austria; Switzerland; Slovenia; United States; Brazil; Sweden; New Zealand	France; Poland; Slovenia; Slovakia; Switzerland; Ireland; Spain; Canada; Croatia; Czech Republic; Great Britain	Czech Republic; Slovakia; Austria; Ukraine; France; Great Britain; New Zealand; Poland; United States; Netherlands; Germany; Andorra; Brazil; Spain; Slovenia; Australia; Italy; ROC	Spain; Australia; Andorra; Germany; New Zealand; Czech Republic; Austria; Brazil; United States; Great Britain; Italy

Great Britain, the Czech Republic and Spain achieved qualification in all four classes, and thus joined host Japan in completing their qualification pathway for Canoe slalom at the 2020 Games. Further events providing opportunities to qualify for other nations will take place throughout 2020.
