= Canoeing at the 2016 Summer Olympics – Men's slalom K-1 =

Men's canoe slalom K-1 at the Games of the XXXI Olympiad
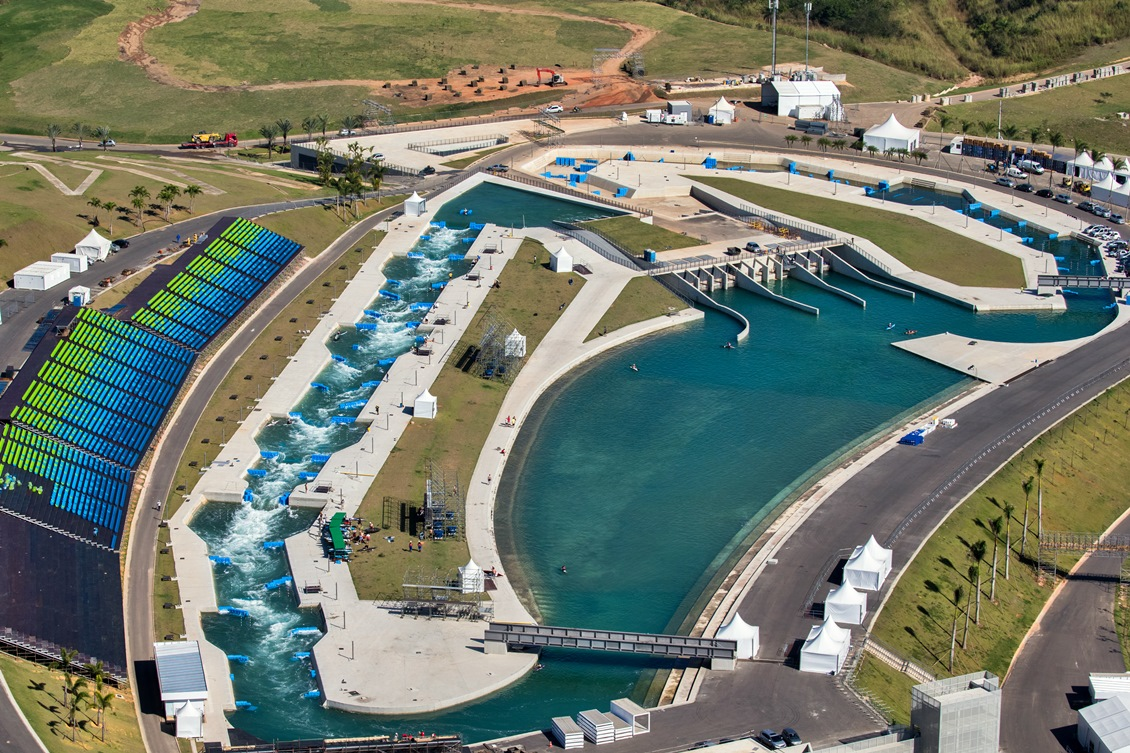
- Aerial view of the Olympic Whitewater Stadium, where the Men's canoe slalom K-1 took place.
- Venue: Olympic Whitewater Stadium
- Date: 7–10 August 2016
- Competitors: 21 from 21 nations
- Winning time: 88.53 s

Medalists
1st place, gold medalist(s)		Joe Clarke	Great Britain
2nd place, silver medalist(s)		Peter Kauzer	Slovenia
3rd place, bronze medalist(s)		Jiří Prskavec	Czech Republic

The men's canoe slalom K-1 event at the 2016 Summer Olympics in Rio de Janeiro took place from 7 - 10 August at the Olympic Whitewater Stadium. Joe Clarke won the gold medal for Great Britain.

== Schedule ==
All times are Brasília Time (UTC−3).

Date	Time	Round
Sunday, 7 August 2016		Heats
Wednesday, 10 August 2016		Semi-final
Wednesday, 10 August 2016		Final

Slalom gate positions for Heats, 7-8 August.

Slalom gate positions for Semi-Finals and Finals, 9-11 August.

== K-1 slalom men ==
Order	Name	Preliminary Heats						Semifinal			Final		
Order	Name	1st Ride	Pen.	2nd Ride	Pen.	Best	Order	Time	Pen.	Order	Time	Pen.	Order
1st place, gold medalist(s)	Joe Clarke (GBR)	135.89	50	86.95	0	86.95	2	90.67	0	3	88.53	0	
2nd place, silver medalist(s)	Peter Kauzer (SLO)	91.11	2	96.88	2	91.11	12	91.01	0	4	88.70	0	
3rd place, bronze medalist(s)	Jiří Prskavec (CZE)	88.71	2	101.18	1	88.71	7	90.62	0	2	88.99	2	
4	Hannes Aigner (GER)	90.33	2	87.31	0	87.31	3	91.87	0	6	89.02	0	
5	Jakub Grigar (SVK)	89.16	0	87.85	2	87.85	4	88.84	0	1	89.43	0	
6	Pedro da Silva (BRA)	88.48	2	90.61	2	88.48	5	95.68	2	10	91.54	0	
7	Giovanni De Gennaro (ITA)	86.85	0	90.74	2	86.85	1	95.59	2	9	91.77	0	
8	Sébastien Combot (FRA)	89.13	0	88.94	0	88.94	9	94.59	0	8	92.55	2	
9	Pavel Eigel (RUS)	96.72	0	88.57	0	88.57	6	92.43	0	7	92.62	2	
10	Michael Dawson (NZL)	88.91	0	90.86	0	88.91	8	91.47	0	5	93.07	0	
11	Kazuki Yazawa (JPN)	92.23	2	98.08	6	92.23	14	97.19	0	11	did not advance		
12	Michal Smolen (USA)	92.96	0	90.13	0	90.13	10	97.87	2	12	did not advance		
13	Mario Leitner (AUT)	93.29	2	93.89	2	93.29	15	100.25	4	13	did not advance		
14	Jure Meglič (AZE)	95.12	2	90.70	0	90.70	11	145.00	52	14	did not advance		
15	Isak Öhrström (SWE)	92.37	2	91.43	0	91.43	13	156.77	54	15	did not advance		
16	Michael Tayler (CAN)	105.66	6	93.47	0	93.47	16	did not advance					
17	Lucien Delfour (AUS)	94.30	2	138.72	50	94.30	17	did not advance					
18	Maciej Okręglak (POL)	96.73	6	94.44	2	94.44	18	did not advance					
19	Tan Ya (CHN)	100.62	2	101.34	4	100.62	19	did not advance					
20	Jonathan Akinyemi (NGR)	107.49	2	104.59	2	104.59	20	did not advance					
21	Bryden Nicholas (COK)	105.18	6	125.64	2	105.18	21	did not advance					
