= Michael Dawson (canoeist) =

New Zealand canoeist

Personal information
- Born: 15 October 1986 (age 39) Tauranga, New Zealand
Medal record
Men's canoe slalom
Representing New Zealand
World Championships
Bronze medal – third place	2017 Pau	Extreme K1

Michael Dawson (born 15 October 1986 in Tauranga) is a New Zealand slalom canoeist who has competed at the international level since 2004.

He won a bronze medal in the inaugural Extreme K1 event at the 2017 ICF Canoe Slalom World Championships in Pau. At the 2012 Summer Olympics in London he competed in the K1 event finishing in 15th place after being eliminated in the semifinals. Four years later in Rio de Janeiro he made the final and finished in 10th place in the K1 event.

In 2010, and again in 2012, he won first place in the extreme-whitewater Green River Narrows Race in North Carolina, US.

== World Cup individual podiums ==
Season	Date	Venue	Position	Event
2009	1 Feb 2009	Mangahao	3rd	K1^{1}
2018	24 Jun 2018	Liptovský Mikuláš	2nd	Extreme K1
2018	1 Jul 2018	Kraków	2nd	Extreme K1

^{1} Oceania Championship counting for World Cup points
