= Thomas Becker (canoeist, born 1990) =

German slalom canoeist (born 1990)

Medal record

Men's canoe slalom

Representing Germany

World Championships
Silver medal – second place	2009 La Seu d'Urgell	C2 team
Silver medal – second place	2015 London	C2 team
Bronze medal – third place	2010 Tacen	C2 team
Bronze medal – third place	2017 Pau	C2

European Championships
Gold medal – first place	2015 Markkleeberg	C2
Gold medal – first place	2018 Prague	C2 team
Silver medal – second place	2018 Prague	C2
Bronze medal – third place	2012 Augsburg	C2
Bronze medal – third place	2012 Augsburg	C2 team

U23 World Championships
Gold medal – first place	2012 Wausau	C2
Bronze medal – third place	2012 Wausau	C2 team

U23 European Championships
Gold medal – first place	2010 Markkleeberg	C2 team
Silver medal – second place	2011 Banja Luka	C2 team
Bronze medal – third place	2011 Banja Luka	C2

Junior World Championships
Silver medal – second place	2008 Roudnice nad Labem	C2 team
Bronze medal – third place	2006 Solkan	C2

Junior European Championships
Gold medal – first place	2007 Kraków	C2
Silver medal – second place	2008 Solkan	C2 team

Thomas Becker (born 3 March 1990) is a retired German slalom canoeist who competed at the international level from 2006 to 2018, specializing in the C2 event.

He won four medals at the ICF Canoe Slalom World Championships with two silvers (C2 team: 2009, 2015) and two bronzes (C2: 2017, C2 team: 2010). He also won five medals at the European Championships (2 golds, 1 silver and 2 bronzes).

He won the overall World Cup title in the C2 class in 2017.

His partner in the C2 boat is Robert Behling.

== World Cup individual podiums ==
Season	Date	Venue	Position	Event
2012	24 June 2012	La Seu d'Urgell	3rd	C2
2015	28 June 2015	Kraków	2nd	C2
2016	19 June 2016	Pau	2nd	C2
2016	4 September 2016	Prague	2nd	C2
2017	24 June 2017	Augsburg	1st	C2
2017	1 July 2017	Markkleeberg	3rd	C2
2017	2 September 2017	Ivrea	2nd	C2
2017	9 September 2017	La Seu d'Urgell	1st	C2
2018	7 July 2018	Augsburg	1st	Mixed C2
