= Hannes Aigner =

German slalom canoeist

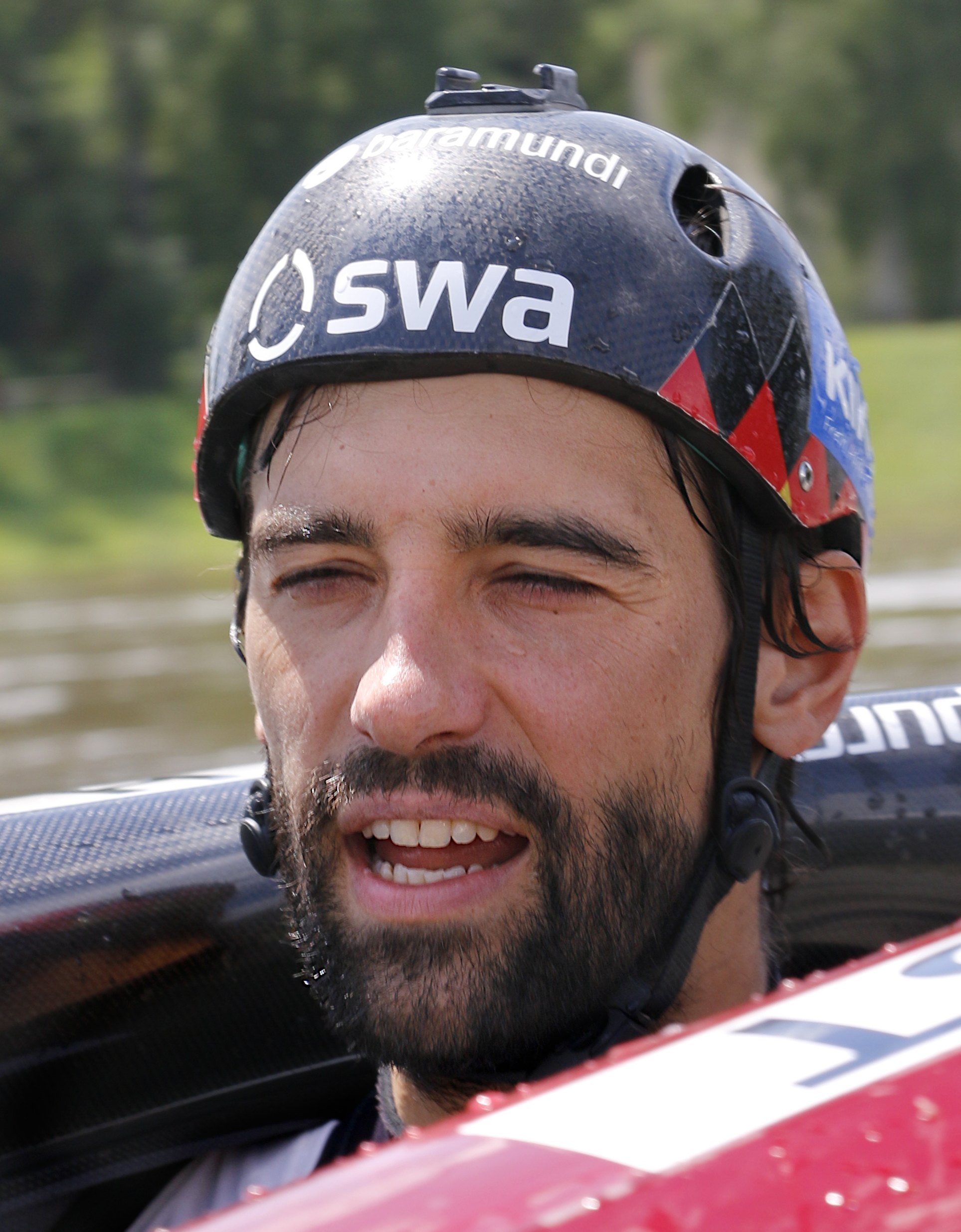
- Aigner in 2024

Personal information
- Nationality: German
- Born: 19 March 1989 (age 37) Augsburg, West Germany
- Height: 1.83 m (6 ft 0 in)
- Weight: 75 kg (165 lb)

Sport
- Country: Germany
- Sport: Canoe slalom
- Event: K1
- Club: Augsburger Kajak Verein
Medal record
Men's canoe slalom
Representing Germany
Olympic Games
Bronze medal – third place	2012 London	K1
Bronze medal – third place	2020 Tokyo	K1
World Championships
Gold medal – first place	2010 Tacen	K1 team
Gold medal – first place	2011 Bratislava	K1 team
Gold medal – first place	2018 Rio de Janeiro	K1
Gold medal – first place	2022 Augsburg	K1 team
European Championships
Gold medal – first place	2015 Markkleeberg	K1 team
Gold medal – first place	2025 Vaires-sur-Marne	K1 team
Silver medal – second place	2010 Bratislava	K1 team
Silver medal – second place	2012 Augsburg	K1 team
Silver medal – second place	2013 Kraków	K1 team
Silver medal – second place	2021 Ivrea	K1 team
Bronze medal – third place	2012 Augsburg	K1
Bronze medal – third place	2016 Liptovský Mikuláš	K1
Bronze medal – third place	2019 Pau	K1 team
Bronze medal – third place	2022 Liptovský Mikuláš	K1 team
U23 European Championships
Silver medal – second place	2009 Liptovský Mikuláš	K1 team
Silver medal – second place	2010 Markkleeberg	K1
Junior World Championships
Gold medal – first place	2006 Solkan	K1 team
Bronze medal – third place	2006 Solkan	K1
Junior European Championships
Gold medal – first place	2007 Kraków	K1
Silver medal – second place	2007 Kraków	K1 team

Hannes Aigner (born 19 March 1989 in Augsburg) is a German slalom canoeist who has competed at the international level since 2006. He is a two-time Olympic bronze medalist.

== Career ==
Aigner competed at three Olympic Games. He won a bronze medal in the K1 event at the 2012 Summer Olympics in London and again in the K1 event at the delayed 2020 Summer Olympics in Tokyo. He also finished fourth in the K1 event at the 2016 Summer Olympics in Rio de Janeiro.

Aigner won four gold medals at the ICF Canoe Slalom World Championships, one in the K1 event (2018) and three in the K1 team event (2010, 2011, 2022). He also won 10 medals at the European Championships (2 golds, 4 silvers and 4 bronzes).

In the 2026 Bavarian local elections, Aigner was a candidate for mayor of Augsburg as a member of the Free Voters. In the election he placed fifth with 7,197 votes (6.6%).

== World Cup individual podiums ==
Season	Date	Venue	Position	Event
2010	3 July 2010	Augsburg	1st	K1
2013	17 August 2013	Tacen	3rd	K1
2014	21 June 2014	Prague	1st	K1
2017	24 June 2017	Augsburg	2nd	K1
2018	8 July 2018	Augsburg	3rd	K1
2019	16 June 2019	Lee Valley	3rd	K1
2023	2 June 2023	Augsburg	3rd	K1
