= Jan Mašek =

Czech slalom canoeist (born 1978)

Personal information
- Nationality: Czech
- Born: 6 July 1978 (age 48)

Sport
- Country: Czech Republic
- Sport: Canoe slalom
- Event: C1, Mixed C2
Medal record
Men's canoe slalom
Representing Czech Republic
World Championships
Gold medal – first place	2002 Bourg St.-Maurice	C1 team
Silver medal – second place	2006 Prague	C1 team
Silver medal – second place	2014 Deep Creek Lake	C1 team
Bronze medal – third place	2003 Augsburg	C1 team
Bronze medal – third place	2005 Penrith	C1 team
Bronze medal – third place	2007 Foz do Iguaçu	C1 team
Bronze medal – third place	2010 Tacen	C1 team
Bronze medal – third place	2017 Pau	Mixed C2
Bronze medal – third place	2018 Rio de Janeiro	Mixed C2
Bronze medal – third place	2019 La Seu d'Urgell	Mixed C2
European Championships
Gold medal – first place	2004 Skopje	C1 team
Gold medal – first place	2009 Nottingham	C1 team
Silver medal – second place	2010 Bratislava	C1 team
Silver medal – second place	2014 Vienna	C1 team
Bronze medal – third place	2005 Tacen	C1 team
Bronze medal – third place	2006 L'Argentière-la-Bessée	C1 team
Junior World Championships
Gold medal – first place	1996 Lipno	C1
Gold medal – first place	1996 Lipno	C1 team

Jan Mašek (born 6 July 1978) is a retired Czech slalom canoeist who competed at the international level from 1995 to 2019, specializing in the C1 event and later on in the mixed C2 event.

Mašek won ten medals at the ICF Canoe Slalom World Championships with a gold (C1 team: 2002), two silvers (C1 team: 2006, 2014) and seven bronzes (Mixed C2: 2017, 2018, 2019, C1 team: 2003, 2005, 2007, 2010).

He also won 6 medals in the C1 team event at the European Championships (2 golds, 2 silvers and 2 bronzes).

His partner in the mixed C2 boat is Veronika Vojtová.

== World Cup individual podiums ==
Season	Date	Venue	Position	Event
2018	7 July 2018	Augsburg	3rd	Mixed C2
2018	1 September 2018	Tacen	1st	Mixed C2
2018	8 September 2018	La Seu d'Urgell	3rd	Mixed C2
