= Veronika Vojtová =

Czech slalom canoeist (born 1990)

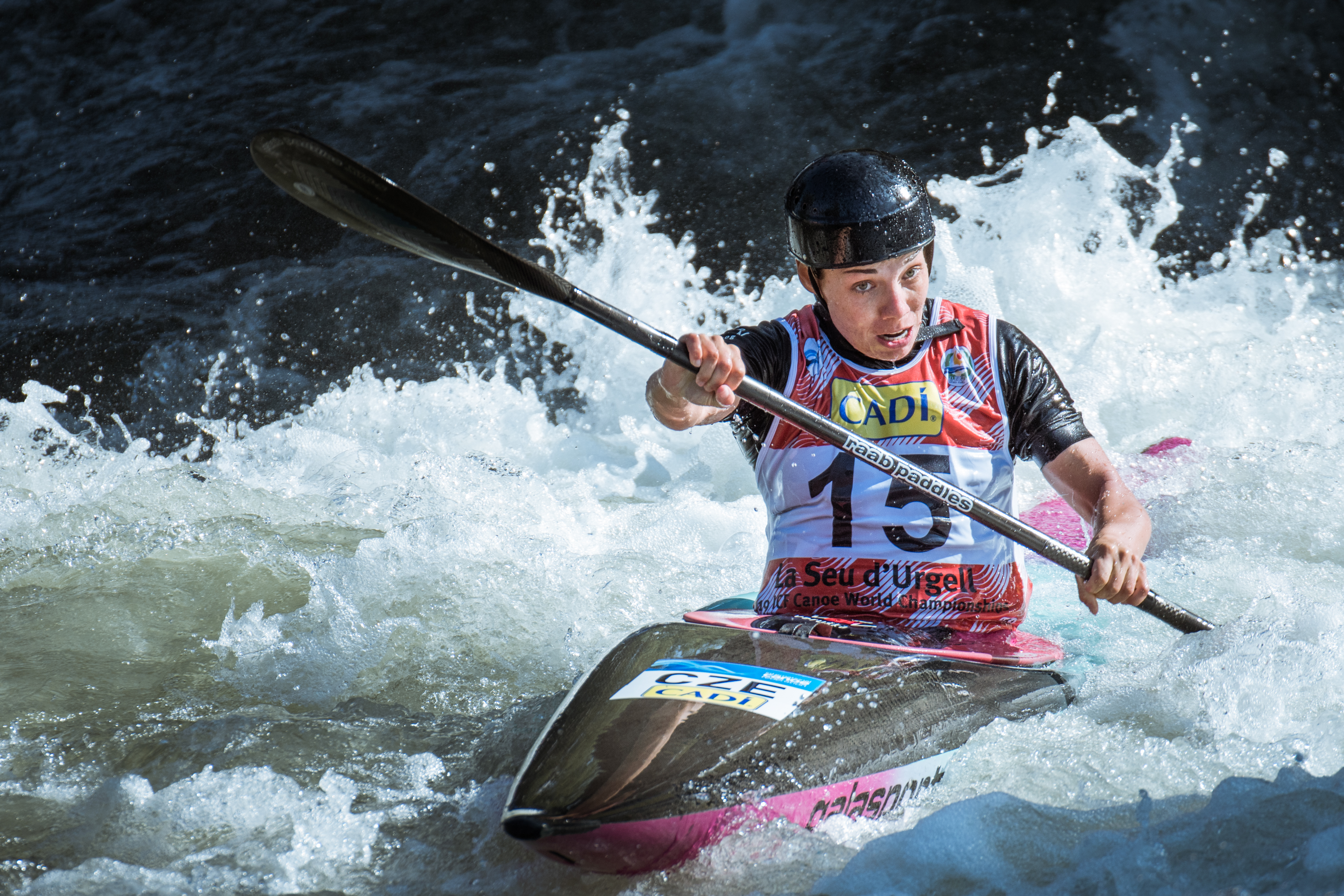
- Veronika Vojtová at the 2019 Canoe Slalom World Championships.

Personal information
- Nationality: Czech
- Born: 7 February 1990 (age 36) Prague, Czech Republic

Sport
- Country: Czech Republic
- Sport: Canoe slalom
- Event(s): K1, Kayak cross, Mixed C2
- Club: Usk Praha
Medal record
Women's canoe slalom
Representing Czech Republic
World Championships
Gold medal – first place	2015 London	K1 team
Gold medal – first place	2019 Prague	Kayak cross
Silver medal – second place	2019 La Seu d'Urgell	K1 team
Bronze medal – third place	2017 Pau	Mixed C2
Bronze medal – third place	2018 Rio de Janeiro	Mixed C2
Bronze medal – third place	2019 La Seu d'Urgell	Mixed C2
European Championships
Gold medal – first place	2014 Vienna	K1 team
Gold medal – first place	2020 Prague	K1 team
Bronze medal – third place	2018 Prague	K1 team
Bronze medal – third place	2021 Ivrea	K1 team
Bronze medal – third place	2021 Ivrea	Kayak cross
U23 World Championships
Gold medal – first place	2013 Liptovský Mikuláš	K1 team
U23 European Championships
Gold medal – first place	2011 Banja Luka	K1 team
Gold medal – first place	2013 Bourg St. Maurice	K1 team
Junior World Championships
Gold medal – first place	2008 Roudnice nad Labem	K1 team
Junior European Championships
Gold medal – first place	2007 Kraków	K1 team

Veronika Vojtová (born 7 February 1990) is a Czech slalom canoeist who has competed at the international level since 2007.

She won six medals at the ICF Canoe Slalom World Championships with two golds (Kayak cross: 2019, K1 team: 2015), one silver (K1 team: 2019) and three bronzes (Mixed C2: 2017, 2018, 2019). She also won two gold and three bronze medals at the European Championships.

Her partner in the mixed C2 boat is Jan Mašek.

== World Cup individual podiums ==
Season	Date	Venue	Position	Event
2018	7 July 2018	Augsburg	3rd	Mixed C2
2018	1 September 2018	Tacen	1st	Mixed C2
2018	8 September 2018	La Seu d'Urgell	3rd	Mixed C2
2019	8 September 2019	Prague	1st	Kayak cross^{1}
2020	7 November 2020	Pau	1st	Kayak cross
2023	18 June 2023	Tacen	1st	Kayak cross

^{1} World Championship counting for World Cup points
