= 2018 ICF Canoe Slalom World Championships =

Canoe slalom event in Rio de Janeiro, Brazil

- Venue: Deodoro Olympic Whitewater Stadium
- Location: Rio de Janeiro, Brazil
- Dates: 25–30 September

The 2018 ICF Canoe Slalom World Championships were the 39th edition of the ICF Canoe Slalom World Championships. The event took place from 25 to 30 September 2018 in Rio de Janeiro, Brazil under the auspices of International Canoe Federation (ICF). The competitions were held at the Deodoro Olympic Whitewater Stadium which had also hosted the canoe slalom events of the 2016 Summer Olympics.

Brazil hosted the event for the third time after the 1997 championships in Três Coroas and the 2007 championships in Foz do Iguaçu.

It was the first World Championships not to feature the discontinued men's C2 event.

Russia and Argentina won their first medals at the Canoe Slalom World Championships. Host nation Brazil won their first gold medal.

== Schedule ==
11 medal events were held.

All times listed are UTC-3.

Date	Starting Time	Events
25 September	11:15	K1W, C1M, C1W, K1M teams
26 September	10:15	C1M, K1W heats – 1st run
26 September	13:30	C1M, K1W heats – 2nd run
27 September	09:00	C1W, K1M heats – 1st run
27 September	12:45	C1W, K1M heats – 2nd run
27 September	15:45	Extreme K1W, Extreme K1M time trials
28 September	09:00	C2Mx semifinal
28 September	10:15	C2Mx final
28 September	14:48	C1M, K1W semifinals
29 September	09:03	C1M, K1W finals
29 September	14:03	C1W, K1M semifinals
30 September	10:03	C1W, K1M finals
30 September	15:33	Extreme K1M, Extreme K1W 1/4 finals, 1/2 finals and finals

== Medal summary ==
=== Medal table ===
* Host nation (Brazil)

Rank	Nation	Gold	Silver	Bronze	Total
1	Great Britain (GBR)	2	3	2	7
2	Germany (GER)	2	1	2	5
3	Australia (AUS)	2	0	0	2
4	France (FRA)	1	2	1	4
5	Poland (POL)	1	1	0	2
6	Brazil (BRA)*	1	0	0	1
6	Italy (ITA)	1	0	0	1
6	Slovakia (SVK)	1	0	0	1
9	Czech Republic (CZE)	0	2	3	5
10	Netherlands (NED)	0	1	0	1
10	Slovenia (SLO)	0	1	0	1
12	Russia (RUS)	0	0	2	2
13	Argentina (ARG)	0	0	1	1
Totals (13 entries)		11	11	11	33

=== Men ===
==== Canoe ====
Event	Gold		Silver		Bronze	
C1	Franz Anton; Germany	97.06	Ryan Westley; Great Britain	97.94	Sideris Tasiadis; Germany	98.87
C1 team	Slovakia; Alexander Slafkovský; Michal Martikán; Matej Beňuš	99.67	Slovenia; Benjamin Savšek; Luka Božič; Anže Berčič	99.95	Great Britain; David Florence; Ryan Westley; Adam Burgess	100.07

==== Kayak ====
Event	Gold		Silver		Bronze	
K1	Hannes Aigner; Germany	89.69	Jiří Prskavec; Czech Republic	90.65	Pavel Eigel; Russia	92.17
K1 team	Great Britain; Joe Clarke; Bradley Forbes-Cryans; Christopher Bowers	92.45	Poland; Dariusz Popiela; Mateusz Polaczyk; Michał Pasiut	93.88	Czech Republic; Ondřej Tunka; Vít Přindiš; Jiří Prskavec	94.84
Extreme K1	Christian De Dionigi; Italy		Boris Neveu; France		Thomas Bersinger; Argentina	

=== Women ===
==== Canoe ====
Event	Gold		Silver		Bronze	
C1	Jessica Fox; Australia	109.07	Mallory Franklin; Great Britain	113.85	Tereza Fišerová; Czech Republic	116.74
C1 team	Great Britain; Mallory Franklin; Kimberley Woods; Bethan Forrow	115.78	Czech Republic; Tereza Fišerová; Kateřina Havlíčková; Gabriela Satková	117.34	France; Lucie Prioux; Lucie Baudu; Claire Jacquet	121.27

==== Kayak ====
Event	Gold		Silver		Bronze	
K1	Jessica Fox; Australia	102.06	Mallory Franklin; Great Britain	104.34	Ricarda Funk; Germany	105.32
K1 team	France; Lucie Baudu; Marie-Zélia Lafont; Camille Prigent	108.37	Germany; Ricarda Funk; Jasmin Schornberg; Lisa Fritsche	109.12	Great Britain; Mallory Franklin; Fiona Pennie; Kimberley Woods	109.36
Extreme K1	Ana Sátila; Brazil		Martina Wegman; Netherlands		Polina Mukhgaleeva; Russia	

=== Mixed ===
==== Canoe ====
There were no heats for the Mixed C2 event. Only semifinal and final runs. The gate setup was the same as for the heats of the other individual events, but different from the setup used for the semifinals and finals of those events.

Event	Gold		Silver		Bronze	
C2	Poland; Marcin Pochwała; Aleksandra Stach	106.48	France; Yves Prigent; Margaux Henry	106.84	Czech Republic; Veronika Vojtová; Jan Mašek	110.25
