= Christian De Dionigi =

Italian slalom canoeist

Personal information
- Nationality: Italian
- Born: 26 December 1992 (age 33)

Sport
- Country: Italy
- Sport: Canoe slalom
- Event: K1, Extreme K1
- Club: Canoa Club Milano
Medal record
Men's canoe slalom
Representing Italy
World Championships
Gold medal – first place	2018 Rio de Janeiro	Extreme K1
U23 European Championships
Bronze medal – third place	2014 Skopje	K1 team

Christian De Dionigi is an Italian slalom canoeist who has competed at the international level since 2013.

He won a gold medal in the Extreme K1 event at the 2018 ICF Canoe Slalom World Championships in Rio de Janeiro.

== World Cup individual podiums ==
Season	Date	Venue	Position	Event
2018	30 Sep 2018	Rio de Janeiro	1st	Extreme K1^{1}
2019	15 June 2019	Lee Valley	2nd	Extreme K1
2019	30 June 2019	Tacen	3rd	Extreme K1
2021	12 September 2021	Pau	3rd	Extreme K1

^{1} World Championship counting for World Cup points
