= Martina Wegman =

Dutch slalom canoeist (born 1989)

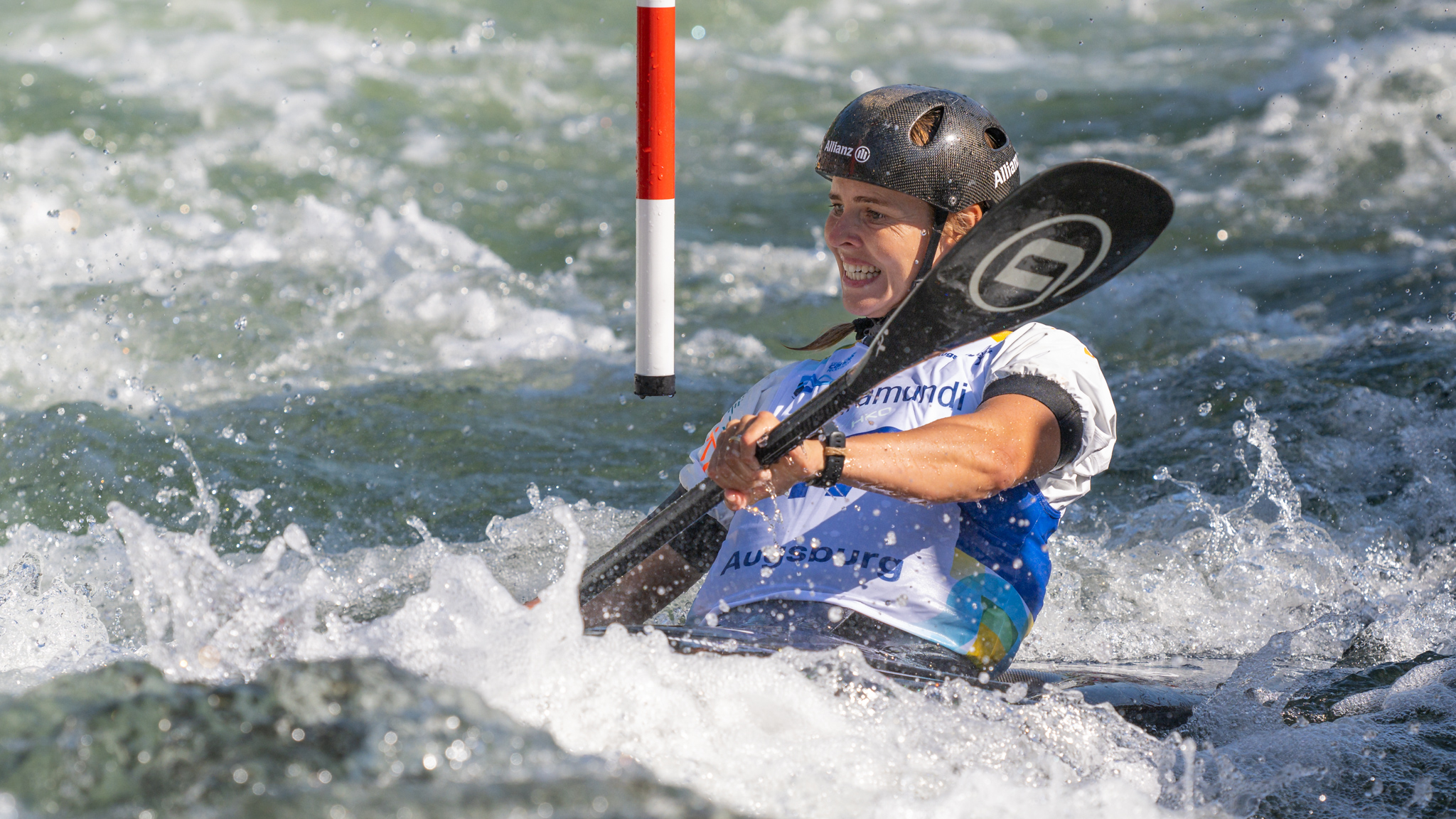

Personal information
- Nationality: Dutch
- Born: 13 June 1989 (age 37) Schoorl
- Height: 1.75 m (5 ft 9 in)

Sport
- Country: Netherlands
- Sport: Canoe slalom
- Event: K1, Kayak cross
Medal record
Women's canoe slalom
Representing Netherlands
World Championships
Silver medal – second place	2018 Rio de Janeiro	Kayak cross

Martina Wegman (born 13 June 1989) is a Dutch slalom canoeist who has competed at the international level since 2014, specializing in K1 and kayak cross.

She won a silver medal in kayak cross at the 2018 ICF Canoe Slalom World Championships in Rio de Janeiro. She also won the overall World Cup title in kayak cross in 2018, the first season when this event counted for world cup points.

Wegman competed at the 2020 Summer Olympics in Tokyo where she finished 7th in the K1 event. She also competed at the 2024 Summer Olympics, finishing 13th in the K1 event and 21st in kayak cross.

== World Cup individual podiums ==
Season	Date	Venue	Position	Event
2018	8 July 2018	Augsburg	2nd	Kayak cross
2018	30 September 2018	Rio de Janeiro	2nd	Kayak cross^{1}
2019	30 June 2019	Tacen	1st	Kayak cross
2021	12 September 2021	Pau	1st	Kayak cross
2022	19 June 2022	Kraków	1st	Kayak cross

^{1} World Championship counting for World Cup points
