= Ondrej Cibak Whitewater Slalom Course =

Artificial whitewater course in Liptovský Mikuláš, Slovakia

Coordinates: 49.0735°N 19.619°E

- Areál vodného slalomu Ondreja Cibáka

About
- Locale: Liptovský Mikuláš, Slovakia
- Managing agent: Tatra Canoe Club
- Designer: Ondrej Cibák
- Main shape: Y-shaped
- Adjustable: No
- Water source: Váh River
- Pumped: No
- Flow diversion: Yes
- Practice pool: Yes
- Grandstands: Covered Stadium
- Canoe lift: No
- Facilities: Yes
- Construction: 2002 North (Orava) reconstruction 2004 South (Váh) reconstruction 2012 Stadium
- Opening date: 1978

Stats
- Length: North (Orava): 300 metres (984 ft) South (Váh): 335 metres (1,099 ft)
- Drop: 7.5 metres (25 ft)
- Slope: North (Orava): 2.5% (132 ft/mi) South (Váh): 2.2% (118 ft/mi)
- Flowrate: 15 m^{3}/s (530 cu ft/s)

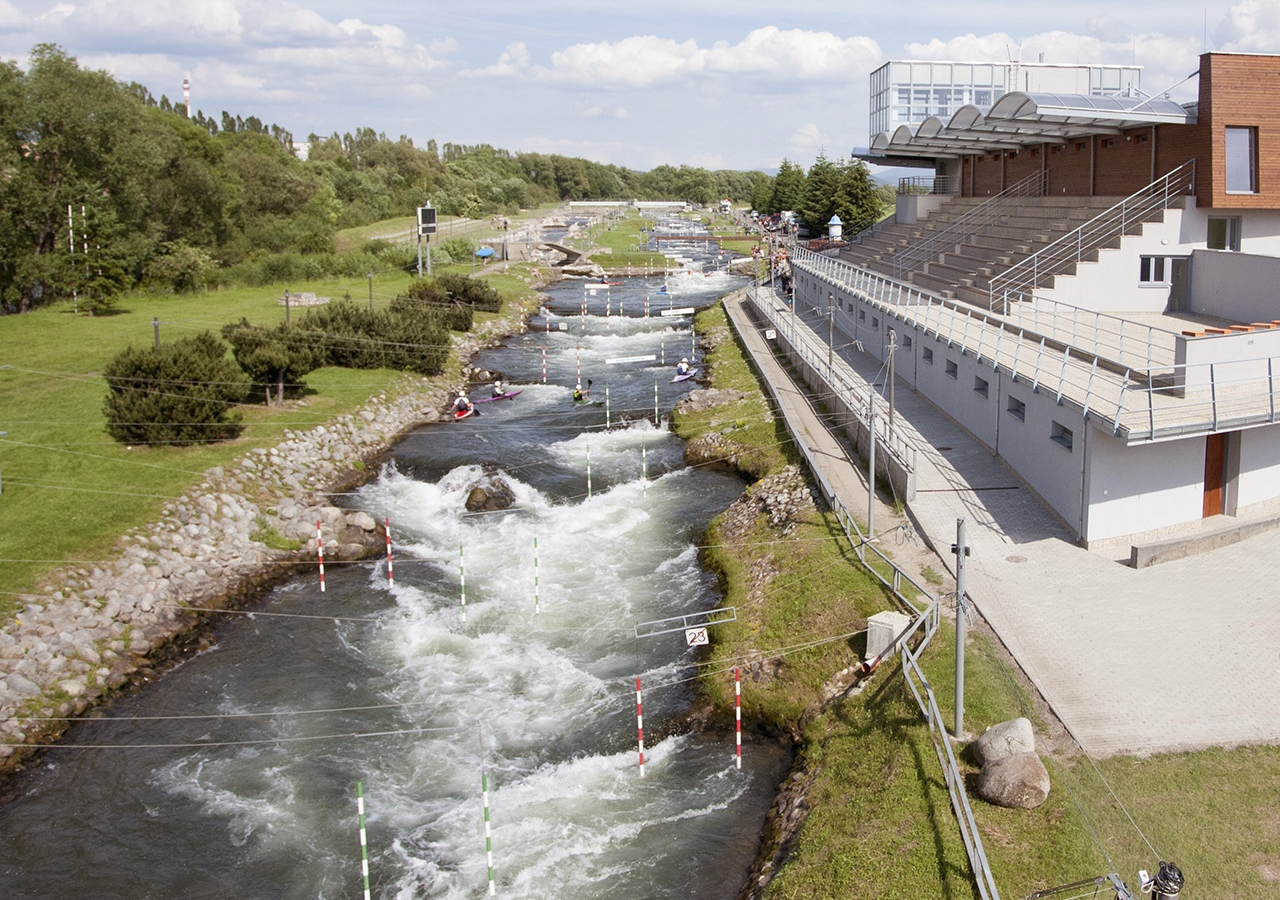
The final section of the course as it passes in front of the newly constructed stadium.

The Ondrej Cibak Whitewater Slalom Course, in Liptovský Mikuláš, Slovakia, is the world's second-oldest artificial whitewater venue for international canoe slalom competition, after the Augsburg Eiskanal. Built in 1978, it diverts water around a small dam on the Váh river. With recent upgrades, including a covered stadium for spectators, it remains a prime site for the sport.

As a training facility, it is home course for canoe slalom's most highly decorated athlete, Michal Martikán, who has five Olympic medals, two of them gold, and for Elena Kaliská, who also has two Olympic golds. Both athletes have won numerous World and European Championships.

In addition to slalom practice, experienced paddlers can train in kayaks and canoes for running narrow creeks. For the general public, it operates as a family water park with guided raft trips.

== Venue ==
Two parallel channels merge beyond the halfway point. The shorter, steeper branch, on the north side, called the Orava channel, makes a dramatic left turn and drop into the common channel. The water diverters are non-moveable boulders cemented into place.

Ondrej Cibák Whitewater Slalom Course in Liptovský Mikuláš, Slovakia

The 7.5 meter drop is the highest of any artificial whitewater course in the international competition circuit, giving Cibak the steepest overall slope, over 2% for both branches. The common channel and the south branch are rated as whitewater class II-III, with the north branch class III-IV.

It was the site for the 2013 Junior and U23 World Championships, held on 17–21 July.

The gate maps for these races are shown below, upstream gates in red. All gates are 2-pole gates; numbers with arrows are flush gates navigated in the direction of the arrow.

ICF Junior & U23 Canoe Slalom World Championships 2013 -- Gate set for Preliminary Heats.

ICF Junior & U23 Canoe Slalom World Championships 2013 -- Gate set for Semi-finals and Finals

== Gallery ==
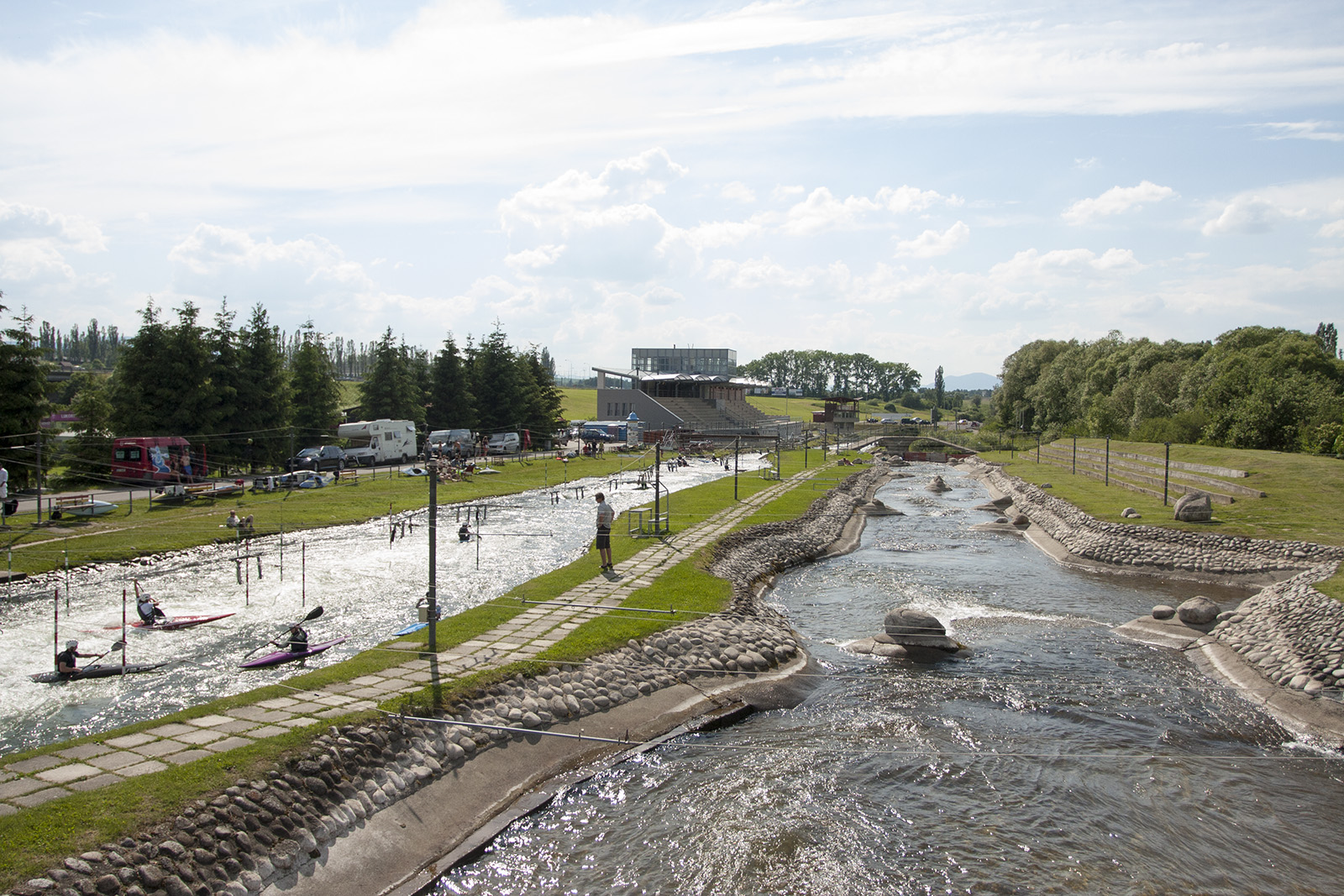
North Branch.

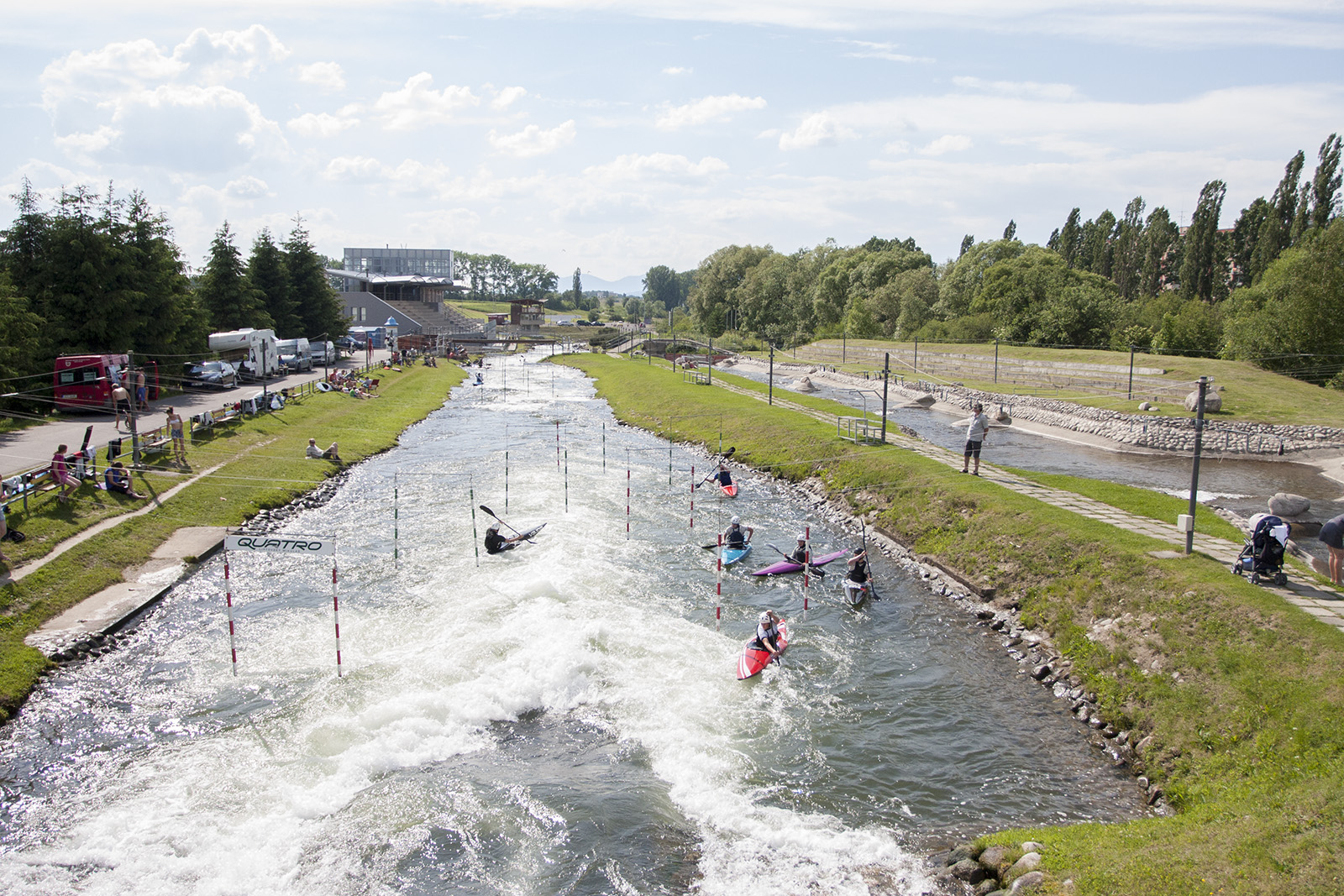
South Branch.

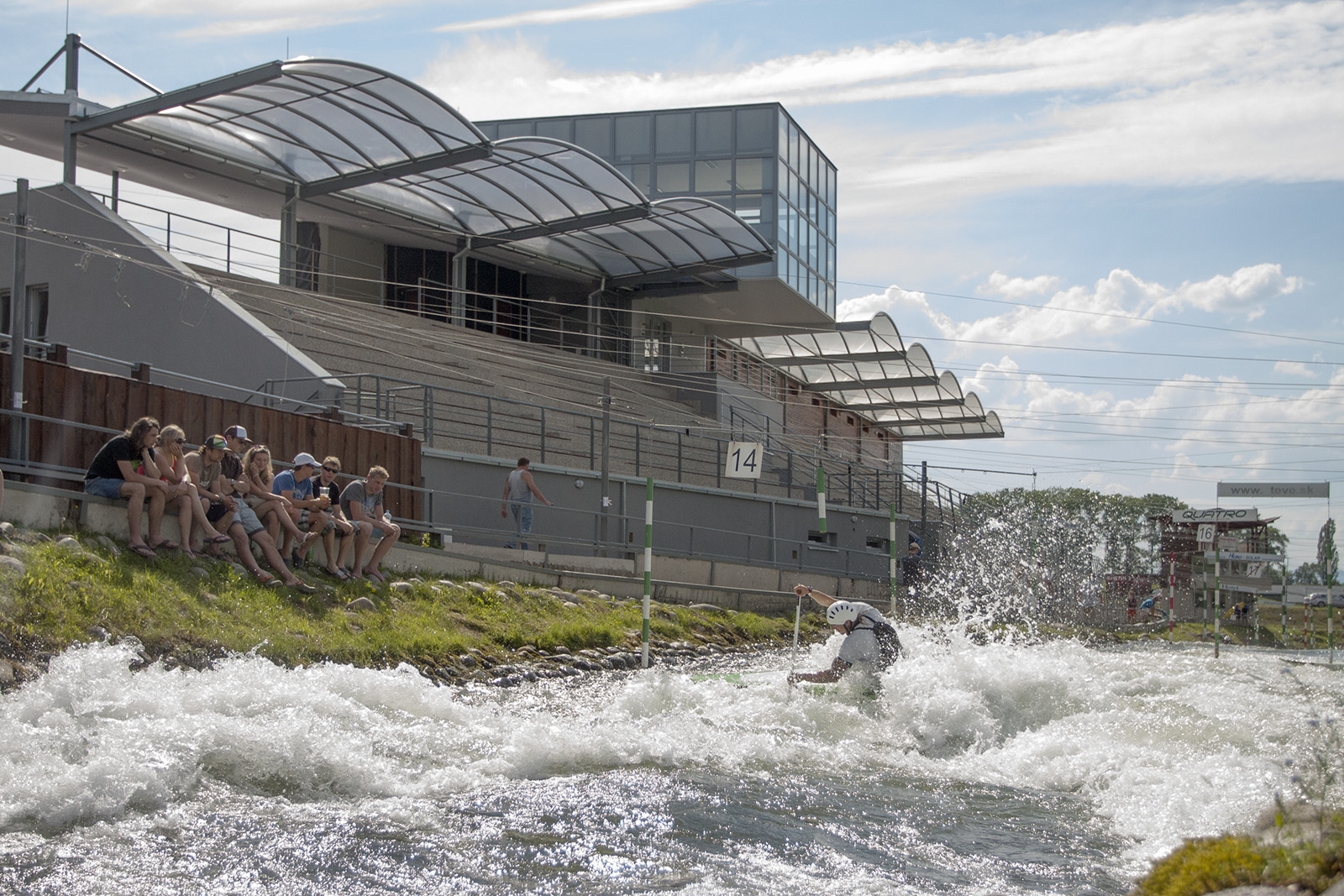
Confluence of North and South Branches.

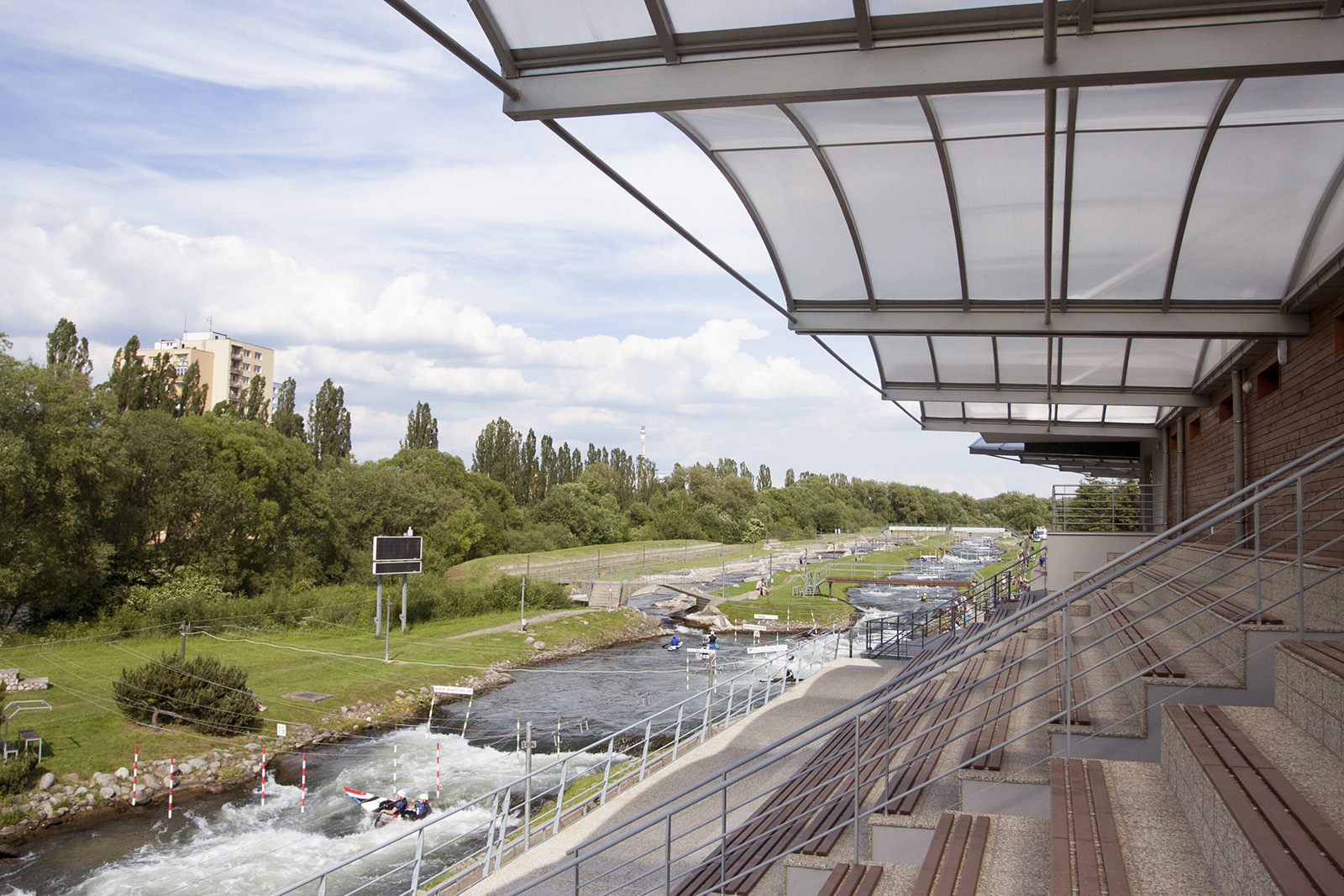
Stadium seats.

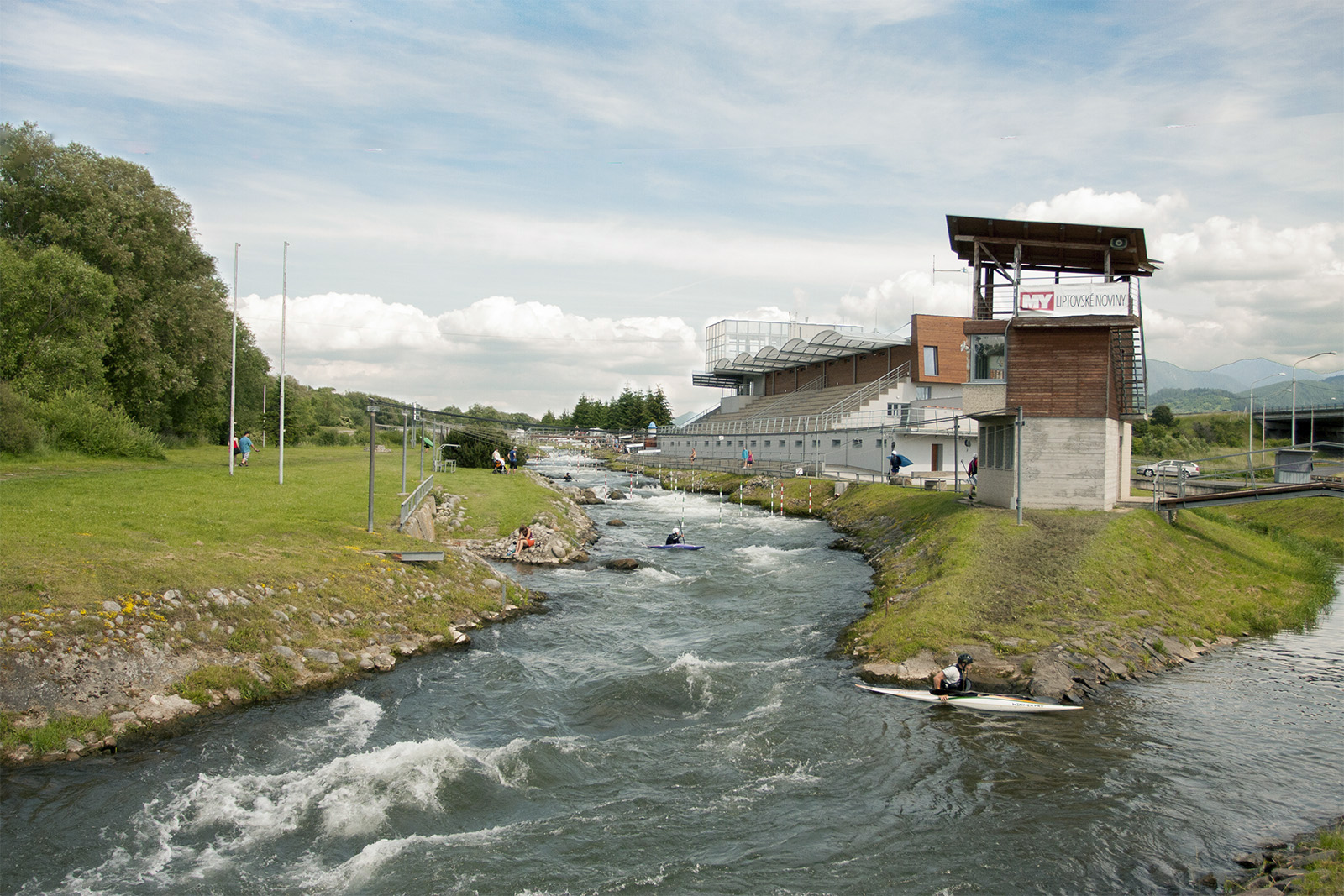
End of course.
