= List of canoeists at the 2016 Summer Olympics =

This is a list of canoeists who competed at the 2016 Summer Olympics in Rio de Janeiro, Brazil. Canoeists were competing in 16 canoeing events.

== Canoe Slalom ==
=== K-1 Men ===
Lucien Delfour (AUS)

Mario Leitner (AUT)

Jure Meglič (AZE)

Pedro da Silva (BRA)

Michael Tayler (CAN)

Tan Ya (CHN)

Bryden Nicholas (COK)

Jiří Prskavec (CZE)

Sébastien Combot (FRA)

Hannes Aigner (GER)

Joe Clarke (GBR)

Giovanni De Gennaro (ITA)

Kazuki Yazawa (JPN)

Michael Dawson (NZL)

Jonathan Akinyemi (NGR)

Maciej Okręglak (POL)

Pavel Eigel (RUS)

Peter Kauzer (SLO)

Jakub Grigar (SVK)

Isak Öhrström (SWE)

Michal Smolen (USA)

=== K-1 Women ===
Jessica Fox (AUS)

Corinna Kuhnle (AUT)

Ana Sátila (BRA)

Li Lu (CHN)

Ella Nicholas (COK)

Kateřina Kudějová (CZE)

Maialen Chourraut (ESP)

Marie-Zélia Lafont (FRA)

Melanie Pfeifer (GER)

Fiona Pennie (GBR)

Stefanie Horn (ITA)

Aki Yazawa (JPN)

Yekaterina Smirnova (KAZ)

Hind Jamili (MAR)

Luuka Jones (NZL)

Natalia Pacierpnik (POL)

Marta Kharitonova (RUS)

Urša Kragelj (SLO)

Jana Dukátová (SVK)

Viktoriia Us (UKR)

Ashley Nee (USA)

=== C-1 Men ===
Sebas Rossi (ARG)

Ian Burrows (AUS)

Felipe Borges (BRA)

Cameron Smedley (CAN)

Shu Jianming (CHN)

Vítězslav Gebas (CZE)

Ander Elosegi (ESP)

Denis Gargaud Chanut (FRA)

Sideris Tasiadis (GER)

David Florence (GBR)

Takuya Haneda (JPN)

Grzegorz Hedwig (POL)

Alexander Lipatov (RUS)

Jean Pierre Bourhis (SEN)

Benjamin Savšek (SLO)

Matej Beňuš (SVK)

Casey Eichfeld (USA)

=== C-2 Men ===
Charles Correa/Anderson Oliveria (BRA)

Jonáš Kašpar/Marek Šindler (CZE)

Gauthier Klauss/Matthieu Péché (FRA)

Franz Anton/Jan Benzien (GER)

David Florence/Richard Hounslow (GBR)

Shota Sasaki/Tsubasa Sasaki (JPN)

Piotr Szczepański/Marcin Pochwała (POL)

Mikhail Kuznetsov/Dmitry Larionov (RUS)

Luka Božič/Sašo Taljat (SLO)

Ladislav Škantár/ Peter Škantár (SVK)

Lukas Werro/Simon Werro (SUI)

Devin McEwan/Casey Eichfeld (USA)
