= 2016 Canoe Slalom World Cup =

The 2016 Canoe Slalom World Cup was a series of five races in 5 canoeing and kayaking categories organized by the International Canoe Federation (ICF). It was the 29th edition.

== Calendar ==
The series opened with World Cup Race 1 in Ivrea, Italy (June 3–5) and concluded with the World Cup Final in Tacen, Slovenia (September 9–11).

Label	Venue	Date
World Cup Race 1	(Italy) Ivrea	3–5 June
World Cup Race 2	(Spain) La Seu d'Urgell	10–12 June
World Cup Race 3	(France) Pau	17–19 June
World Cup Race 4	(Czech Republic) Prague	2–4 September
World Cup Final	(Slovenia) Tacen	9–11 September

== Standings ==
The winner of each race was awarded 60 points (double points were awarded for the World Cup Final for all the competitors who reached at least the semifinal stage). Points for lower places differed from one category to another. Every participant was guaranteed at least 2 points for participation and 5 points for qualifying for the semifinal run (10 points in the World Cup Final). If two or more athletes or boats were equal on points, the ranking was determined by their positions in the World Cup Final.

=== C1 men ===
Pos	Athlete	Points
1	Alexander Slafkovský (SVK)	290
2	Nicolas Peschier (FRA)	245
3	Adam Burgess (GBR)	241
4	Pierre-Antoine Tillard (FRA)	220
5	Anže Berčič (SLO)	205
6	Benjamin Savšek (SLO)	200
7	Matej Beňuš (SVK)	197
8	Thomas Koechlin (SUI)	189
9	Jure Lenarčič (SLO)	169
10	Lukáš Rohan (CZE)	166

=== C1 women ===
Pos	Athlete	Points
1	Mallory Franklin (GBR)	307
2	Kimberley Woods (GBR)	302
3	Jessica Fox (AUS)	285
4	Viktoria Wolffhardt (AUT)	198
5	Claire Jacquet (FRA)	198
6	Núria Vilarrubla (ESP)	195
7	Eilidh Gibson (GBR)	159
8	Jasmine Royle (GBR)	156
9	Tereza Fišerová (CZE)	124
10	Simona Glejteková (SVK)	120

=== C2 men ===
Pos	Athletes	Points
1	Pierre Picco/Hugo Biso (FRA)	253
2	Nicolas Scianimanico/Hugo Cailhol (FRA)	239
3	Pierre-Antoine Tillard/Edern Le Ruyet (FRA)	236
4	Ondřej Karlovský/Jakub Jáně (CZE)	234
5	Ladislav Škantár/Peter Škantár (SVK)	222
6	David Schröder/Nico Bettge (GER)	210
7	Robert Behling/Thomas Becker (GER)	182
8	Piotr Szczepański/Marcin Pochwała (POL)	161
9	Filip Brzeziński/Andrzej Brzeziński (POL)	148
10	Tomáš Kučera/Ján Bátik (SVK)	130

=== K1 men ===
Pos	Athlete	Points
1	Mathieu Biazizzo (FRA)	224
2	Vít Přindiš (CZE)	222
3	Bradley Forbes-Cryans (GBR)	211
4	Peter Kauzer (SLO)	210
5	Sebastian Schubert (GER)	203
6	Ondřej Tunka (CZE)	203
7	Janoš Peterlin (SLO)	192
8	Étienne Daille (FRA)	191
9	Giovanni De Gennaro (ITA)	187
10	Dariusz Popiela (POL)	183

=== K1 women ===
Pos	Athlete	Points
1	Ricarda Funk (GER)	306
2	Jessica Fox (AUS)	290
3	Jana Dukátová (SVK)	233
4	Ana Sátila (BRA)	229
5	Jasmin Schornberg (GER)	224
6	Eva Terčelj (SLO)	223
7	Lizzie Neave (GBR)	212
8	Violetta Oblinger-Peters (AUT)	191
9	Fiona Pennie (GBR)	161
10	Corinna Kuhnle (AUT)	160

== Results ==
=== World Cup Race 1 ===
Ivrea, Italy hosted the Canoe Slalom World Cup for the first time. It was also the first time that K1 slalom cross for men and women was an event at a world cup race. No world cup points were awarded for the cross event. The events took place from 3 to 5 June.

Event	Gold	Score	Silver	Score	Bronze	Score
C1 men	Michal Jáně (CZE)	93.37	Thomas Koechlin (SUI)	95.59	Kilian Foulon (FRA)	99.61
C1 women	Jessica Fox (AUS)	113.92	Mallory Franklin (GBR)	114.17	Kimberley Woods (GBR)	114.89
C2 men	France; Nicolas Scianimanico; Hugo Cailhol	107.37	Germany; David Schröder; Nico Bettge	108.48	China; Zhang Hang; Deng Xiao	110.45
K1 men	Giovanni De Gennaro (ITA)	90.13	Daniele Molmenti (ITA)	91.24	Dariusz Popiela (POL)	91.58
K1 women	Ricarda Funk (GER)	102.98	Jessica Fox (AUS)	103.33	Corinna Kuhnle (AUT)	105.66
K1 men cross	Vavřinec Hradilek (CZE)		Vít Přindiš (CZE)		Richard Powell (USA)	
K1 women cross	Ajda Novak (SLO)		Kate Eckhardt (AUS)		Amálie Hilgertová (CZE)	

=== World Cup Race 2 ===
The second race of the series took place at the Segre Olympic Park in La Seu d'Urgell, Spain from 10 to 12 June.

Event	Gold	Score	Silver	Score	Bronze	Score
C1 men	Alexander Slafkovský (SVK)	97.25	Denis Gargaud Chanut (FRA)	98.64	Vítězslav Gebas (CZE)	100.79
C1 women	Núria Vilarrubla (ESP)	113.74	Miren Lazkano (ESP)	119.00	Noemie Fox (AUS)	119.98
C2 men	France; Pierre-Antoine Tillard; Edern Le Ruyet	99.53	Spain; Daniel Marzo; Jesús Pérez	102.07	Germany; David Schröder; Nico Bettge	103.76
K1 men	Vít Přindiš (CZE)	91.85	Jakub Grigar (SVK)	92.03	Peter Kauzer (SLO)	92.18
K1 women	Maialen Chourraut (ESP)	99.61	Jessica Fox (AUS)	101.73	Ricarda Funk (GER)	103.71
K1 men cross	Vít Přindiš (CZE)		Jaxon Merritt (AUS)		Ondřej Tunka (CZE)	
K1 women cross	Martina Wegman (NED)		Georgia Rankin (AUS)		Sage Donnelly (USA)	

=== World Cup Race 3 ===
The third race of the series took place at the Pau-Pyrénées Whitewater Stadium, France from 17 to 19 June.

Event	Gold	Score	Silver	Score	Bronze	Score
C1 men	Alexander Slafkovský (SVK)	100.43	Nicolas Peschier (FRA)	101.95	Takuya Haneda (JPN)	102.37
C1 women	Mallory Franklin (GBR)	122.17	Jessica Fox (AUS)	123.18	Núria Vilarrubla (ESP)	125.44
C2 men	France; Pierre-Antoine Tillard; Edern Le Ruyet	110.12	Germany; Robert Behling; Thomas Becker	110.54	France; Nicolas Scianimanico; Hugo Cailhol	110.85
K1 men	Samuel Hernanz (ESP)	93.54	Mathieu Biazizzo (FRA)	93.71	Sébastien Combot (FRA)	94.26
K1 women	Marie-Zélia Lafont (FRA)	108.36	Jana Dukátová (SVK)	110.79	Maialen Chourraut (ESP)	113.46
K1 men cross	Vít Přindiš (CZE)		Vavřinec Hradilek (CZE)		Martin Dougoud (SUI)	
K1 women cross	Caroline Loir (FRA)		Ajda Novak (SLO)		Alixe Degremont (FRA)	

=== World Cup Race 4 ===
The penultimate race of the series took place at the Prague-Troja Canoeing Centre, Czech Republic from 2 to 4 September.

Event	Gold	Score	Silver	Score	Bronze	Score
C1 men	Matej Beňuš (SVK)	98.91	Ryan Westley (GBR)	99.16	Benjamin Savšek (SLO)	100.74
C1 women	Jessica Fox (AUS)	113.59	Kateřina Hošková (CZE)	120.52	Mallory Franklin (GBR)	120.74
C2 men	Slovakia; Ladislav Škantár; Peter Škantár	108.29	Germany; Robert Behling; Thomas Becker	110.95	Czech Republic; Ondřej Karlovský; Jakub Jáně	113.82
K1 men	Jiří Prskavec (CZE)	91.60	Ondřej Tunka (CZE)	91.61	Vavřinec Hradilek (CZE)	91.77
K1 women	Ricarda Funk (GER)	108.59	Ana Sátila (BRA)	110.75	Eva Terčelj (SLO)	111.37
K1 men cross	Hannes Aigner (GER)		Tren Long (USA)		Pedro Gonçalves (BRA)	
K1 women cross	Veronika Vojtová (CZE)		Martina Wegman (NED)		Ana Sátila (BRA)	

=== World Cup Final ===
Tacen, Slovenia hosted the World Cup Final from 9 to 11 September with double points awarded in each category. During the semifinal run of the men's C1 event a newly built concrete block near the end of the course started to crack. This forced the organizers to shorten the course for the rest of the events. The course only had 14 gates after the change. The jury also allowed the top 15 from the men's C1 semifinal to qualify for the final instead of the top 10 because the crack affected some of the later runners like Nicolas Peschier and Pierre-Antoine Tillard.

Event	Gold	Score	Silver	Score	Bronze	Score
C1 men	Benjamin Savšek (SLO)	74.45	Alexander Slafkovský (SVK)	75.09	Casey Eichfeld (USA)	76.90
C1 women	Kimberley Woods (GBR)	85.40	Jessica Fox (AUS)	86.32	Mallory Franklin (GBR)	89.46
C2 men	Slovakia; Ladislav Škantár; Peter Škantár	80.45	France; Nicolas Scianimanico; Hugo Cailhol	82.26	France; Pierre Picco; Hugo Biso	82.43
K1 men	Peter Kauzer (SLO)	69.89	Bradley Forbes-Cryans (GBR)	70.17	Kazuya Adachi (JPN)	72.38
K1 women	Jessica Fox (AUS)	77.55	Corinna Kuhnle (AUT)	79.83	Fiona Pennie (GBR)	79.94
K1 men cross	Boris Neveu (FRA)		Ondřej Tunka (CZE)		Tsubasa Sasaki (JPN)	
K1 women cross	Amálie Hilgertová (CZE)		Martina Wegman (NED)		Kate Eckhardt (AUS)	

== See also ==
- Canoeing at the 2016 Summer Olympics
