= 1999 European Junior Canoe Slalom Championships =

- Location: Solkan, Slovenia

The 1999 European Junior Canoe Slalom Championships were the 3rd edition of the European Junior Canoe Slalom Championships. The event took place in Solkan, Slovenia from 17 to 18 July 1999 under the auspices of the European Canoe Association (ECA). A total of 8 medal events took place.

== Medal summary ==
=== Men ===
==== Canoe ====
Event	Gold		Silver		Bronze	
C1	Přemysl Vlk (CZE)	269.34	Alexander Slafkovský (SVK)	273.66	Jan Benzien (GER)	274.07
C1 team	Germany; Christian Bahmann; Max Remmele; Jan Benzien	158.94	Czech Republic; Stanislav Kaděra; David Chod; Přemysl Vlk	175.19	Slovenia; Drejc Žabjek; Anže Ruden; Anže Buh	187.42
C2	Marcus Becker/Stefan Henze (GER)	282.23	Martin Braud/Cédric Forgit (FRA)	306.66	Krzysztof Bogatek/Dariusz Wrzosek (POL)	307.02
C2 team	France; Sebastien Saget/Julien Paradis; Martin Braud/Cédric Forgit; Remy Gaspard/Julien Gaspard	176.92	Poland; Adam Dudziński/Lukasz Piorkowski; Krzysztof Bogatek/Dariusz Wrzosek; Jarosław Miczek/Wojciech Sekuła	206.15	Czech Republic; Ondřej Voráč/Radek Hopjan; Lukáš Kubričan/Pavel Kubričan; Ladislav Bouška/Jan Merenus	259.07

==== Kayak ====
Event	Gold		Silver		Bronze	
K1	Fabien Lefèvre (FRA)	240.70	Andrej Nolimal (SLO)	244.60	Gregor Laznik (SLO)	248.97
K1 team	Germany; René Mühlmann; Sebastian Winter; Thilo Schmitt	140.30	France; Julien Billaut; Loris Minvielle; Fabien Lefèvre	146.95	Great Britain; Daniel Lomas; Ben Richardson; Richard Hounslow	147.21

=== Women ===
==== Kayak ====
Event	Gold		Silver		Bronze	
K1	Jennifer Bongardt (GER)	287.65	Marie Řihošková (CZE)	291.43	Petra Semerádová (CZE)	296.44
K1 team	Slovenia; Tina Sulič; Jana Mali; Nina Mozetič	170.68	Czech Republic; Michala Dandová; Petra Semerádová; Marie Řihošková	172.74	Germany; Anna Kamps; Ines Gebhard; Jennifer Bongardt	175.92

== Medal table ==
Rank	Nation	Gold	Silver	Bronze	Total
1	Germany (GER)	4	0	2	6
2	France (FRA)	2	2	0	4
3	Czech Republic (CZE)	1	3	2	6
4	Slovenia (SLO)	1	1	2	4
5	Poland (POL)	0	1	1	2
6	Slovakia (SVK)	0	1	0	1
7	Great Britain (GBR)	0	0	1	1
Totals (7 entries)		8	8	8	24
