= 2012 Canoe Slalom World Cup =

The 2012 Canoe Slalom World Cup was a series of five races in 5 canoeing and kayaking categories organized by the International Canoe Federation (ICF). It was the 25th edition.

== Calendar ==
The series opened with World Cup Race 1 in Cardiff, Wales (June 8–10) and ended with the World Cup Final in Bratislava, Slovakia (August 31 – September 2).

Label	Venue	Date
World Cup Race 1	(United Kingdom) Cardiff	8–10 June
World Cup Race 2	(France) Pau	15–17 June
World Cup Race 3	(Spain) La Seu d'Urgell	22–24 June
World Cup Race 4	(Czech Republic) Prague	24–26 August
World Cup Final	(Slovakia) Bratislava	31 August - 2 September

== Final standings ==
The winner of each race was awarded 60 points. Points for lower places differed from one category to another. Every participant was guaranteed at least 2 points for participation and 5 points for qualifying for the semifinal run. If two or more athletes or boats were equal on points, the ranking was determined by their positions in the World Cup Final.

=== C1 men ===
Pos	Athlete	Points
1	Alexander Slafkovský (SVK)	261
2	Ander Elosegi (ESP)	204
3	Matej Beňuš (SVK)	177
4	Jan Benzien (GER)	171
5	Nico Bettge (GER)	167
6	Vítězslav Gebas (CZE)	165
7	David Florence (GBR)	164
8	Benjamin Savšek (SLO)	157
9	Thibaut Vielliard (FRA)	155
10	Karol Rozmuš (SVK)	154

=== C1 women ===
Pos	Athlete	Points
1	Rosalyn Lawrence (AUS)	220
2	Kateřina Hošková (CZE)	215
3	Caroline Loir (FRA)	203
4	Oriane Rebours (FRA)	148
5	Claire Jacquet (FRA)	136
6	Viktoriia Dobrotvorska (UKR)	115
7	Núria Vilarrubla (ESP)	112
8	Anna Kašparová (CZE)	111
9	Mallory Franklin (GBR)	105
10	Monika Jančová (CZE)	103

=== C2 men ===
Pos	Athletes	Points
1	Pierre Labarelle/Nicolas Peschier (FRA)	263
2	Ladislav Škantár/Peter Škantár (SVK)	224
3	Luka Božič/Sašo Taljat (SLO)	174
4	Piotr Szczepański/Marcin Pochwała (POL)	166
5	Franz Anton/Jan Benzien (GER)	159
6	Robert Behling/Thomas Becker (GER)	126
7	Tim Baillie/Etienne Stott (GBR)	126
8	Gauthier Klauss/Matthieu Péché (FRA)	120
9	Jonáš Kašpar/Marek Šindler (CZE)	106
10	Jesús Pérez/Daniel Marzo (ESP)	102

=== K1 men ===
Pos	Athlete	Points
1	Étienne Daille (FRA)	285
2	Fabian Dörfler (GER)	210
3	Vavřinec Hradilek (CZE)	183
4	Sebastian Schubert (GER)	179
5	Paul Böckelmann (GER)	167
6	Lucien Delfour (AUS)	167
7	Jure Meglič (SLO)	157
8	Martin Halčin (SVK)	145
9	Boris Neveu (FRA)	142
10	Ciarán Heurteau (IRL)	134

=== K1 women ===
Pos	Athlete	Points
1	Urša Kragelj (SLO)	228
2	Kateřina Kudějová (CZE)	199
3	Jana Dukátová (SVK)	197
4	Cindy Pöschel (GER)	167
5	Lizzie Neave (GBR)	166
6	Melanie Pfeifer (GER)	164
7	Violetta Oblinger-Peters (AUT)	152
8	Corinna Kuhnle (AUT)	150
9	Maialen Chourraut (ESP)	150
10	Carole Bouzidi (FRA)	142

== Results ==
=== World Cup Race 1 ===
The opening race of the series took place at the Cardiff International White Water facility in Wales from 8 to 10 June. It was set to start on June 8 with heats in the men's and women's C1 and the men's K1. Rain and wind forced the organizers to cancel these heats and the competition resumed a day later with semifinals in these events. David Florence made history by becoming the first paddler to win two gold medals in one world cup meeting. He won the men's C1 and C2 events. Great Britain won the medal table with 2 golds and 1 bronze.

Event	Gold	Score	Silver	Score	Bronze	Score
C1 men	David Florence (GBR)	100.46	Alexander Lipatov (RUS)	102.08	Alexander Slafkovský (SVK)	102.57
C1 women	Rosalyn Lawrence (AUS)	133.57	Jessica Fox (AUS)	140.07	Mallory Franklin (GBR)	144.46
C2 men	United Kingdom; David Florence; Richard Hounslow	108.29	Slovenia; Sašo Taljat; Luka Božič	108.31	Slovakia; Pavol Hochschorner; Peter Hochschorner	109.04
K1 men	Sebastian Schubert (GER)	93.02	Étienne Daille (FRA)	93.24	Paul Böckelmann (GER)	93.61
K1 women	Maialen Chourraut (ESP)	104.40	Jana Dukátová (SVK)	104.70	Cindy Pöschel (GER)	106.70

=== World Cup Race 2 ===
The second world cup race of the season took place at the Pau-Pyrénées Whitewater Stadium, France from 15 to 17 June. It was dominated by the home French paddlers who won 4 golds, 1 silver and 1 bronze.

Event	Gold	Score	Silver	Score	Bronze	Score
C1 men	Tony Estanguet (FRA)	100.79	Grzegorz Kiljanek (POL)	108.61	Alexander Slafkovský (SVK)	108.70
C1 women	Caroline Loir (FRA)	140.79	Kateřina Hošková (CZE)	142.91	Claire Jacquet (FRA)	146.83
C2 men	France; Pierre Labarelle; Nicolas Peschier	109.38	Slovakia; Ladislav Škantár; Peter Škantár	111.75	China; Hu Minghai; Shu Junrong	112.02
K1 men	Étienne Daille (FRA)	100.17	Jan Vondra (CZE)	101.46	Lucien Delfour (AUS)	105.40
K1 women	Maialen Chourraut (ESP)	108.34	Carole Bouzidi (FRA)	110.20	Lizzie Neave (GBR)	112.58

=== World Cup Race 3 ===
The third round of the world cup series took place at the Segre Olympic Park in La Seu d'Urgell, Spain from 22 to 24 June. It was once again dominated by the French paddlers who took home 3 golds, 1 silver and 2 bronzes. Spain won one gold and one bronze.

Event	Gold	Score	Silver	Score	Bronze	Score
C1 men	Jordi Domenjó (ESP)	98.65	David Florence (GBR)	98.69	Tony Estanguet (FRA)	100.82
C1 women	Caroline Loir (FRA)	125.12	Kateřina Hošková (CZE)	129.02	Núria Vilarrubla (ESP)	134.11
C2 men	France; Pierre Labarelle; Nicolas Peschier	106.39	Slovakia; Ladislav Škantár; Peter Škantár	107.79	Germany; Robert Behling; Thomas Becker	108.23
K1 men	Étienne Daille (FRA)	92.50	Fabian Dörfler (GER)	93.66	Vivien Colober (FRA)	93.76
K1 women	Urša Kragelj (SLO)	104.66	Émilie Fer (FRA)	106.17	Kateřina Kudějová (CZE)	106.52

=== World Cup Race 4 ===
The penultimate round of the world cup series took place at the Prague-Troja Canoeing Centre, Czech Republic from 24 to 26 August. French paddlers continued their success by winning 3 golds and 2 silvers. The home Czech team could only manage 1 bronze medal in the men's single canoe. Étienne Daille sealed the overall world cup title before the final round thanks to his third straight win and fourth straight podium finish.

Event	Gold	Score	Silver	Score	Bronze	Score
C1 men	Benjamin Savšek (SLO)	94.07	Alexander Slafkovský (SVK)	96.45	Vítězslav Gebas (CZE)	97.42
C1 women	Caroline Loir (FRA)	117.87	Mallory Franklin (GBR)	119.50	Lena Stöcklin (GER)	123.85
C2 men	France; Pierre Labarelle; Nicolas Peschier	102.78	France; Gauthier Klauss; Matthieu Péché	103.90	Slovenia; Sašo Taljat; Luka Božič	104.17
K1 men	Étienne Daille (FRA)	89.72	Mateusz Polaczyk (POL)	90.90	Fabian Dörfler (GER)	90.95
K1 women	Jana Dukátová (SVK)	103.27	Carole Bouzidi (FRA)	104.79	Ricarda Funk (GER)	105.08

=== World Cup Final ===
The final event of the series took place in Bratislava, Slovakia from 31 August to 2 September and it was the home country that emerged at the top of the medal table thanks to 3 gold medals. The overall world cup champions were crowned at this event.

Event	Gold	Score	Silver	Score	Bronze	Score
C1 men	Alexander Slafkovský (SVK)	111.88	Anže Berčič (SLO)	112.72	Vítězslav Gebas (CZE)	112.81
C1 women	Katarína Macová (SVK)	144.06	Rosalyn Lawrence (AUS)	147.23	Oriane Rebours (FRA)	147.63
C2 men	Germany; Franz Anton; Jan Benzien	123.21	Poland; Piotr Szczepański; Marcin Pochwała	124.02	France; Pierre Labarelle; Nicolas Peschier	124.75
K1 men	Jure Meglič (SLO)	105.82	Boris Neveu (FRA)	106.03	Étienne Daille (FRA)	106.06
K1 women	Jana Dukátová (SVK)	120.99	Kateřina Kudějová (CZE)	124.60	Urša Kragelj (SLO)	124.95
