= Dariusz Wrzosek =

Polish slalom canoeist (born 1982)

Medal record

Men's canoe slalom

Representing Poland

World Championships
| Bronze medal – third place | 2002 Bourg St.-Maurice | C2 team |

European Championships
| Silver medal – second place | 2008 Kraków | C2 team |
| Bronze medal – third place | 2007 Liptovský Mikuláš | C2 team |

U23 European Championships
| Gold medal – first place | 2004 Kraków | C2 team |
| Gold medal – first place | 2005 Kraków | C2 team |

Junior European Championships
| Silver medal – second place | 1999 Solkan | C2 team |
| Bronze medal – third place | 1999 Solkan | C2 |

Dariusz Wrzosek (born 1982) is a Polish slalom canoeist who competed at the international level from 1997 to 2008.

He won a bronze medal in the C2 team event at the 2002 ICF Canoe Slalom World Championships in Bourg St.-Maurice alongside Bartłomiej Kruczek. He also won a silver and a bronze in the same event at the European Championships alongside Jarosław Miczek.
