= 1998 World Junior Canoe Slalom Championships =

The 1998 ICF World Junior Canoe Slalom Championships were the 7th edition of the ICF World Junior Canoe Slalom Championships. The event took place in Lofer, Austria from 17 to 19 July 1998 under the auspices of the International Canoe Federation (ICF).

Seven medal events took place. The C2 team event was not held at these championships.

== Medal summary ==
=== Men ===
==== Canoe ====
Event	Gold		Silver		Bronze	
C1	Lukáš Přinda (CZE)	233.16	Alexander Slafkovský (SVK)	233.62	Primož Gabrijelčič (SLO)	234.49
C1 team	Germany; Stefan Pfannmöller; Achim Heib; Nico Bettge	128.94	Slovenia; Janez Korenjak; Primož Gabrijelčič; Anže Buh	141.36	France; Nicolas Noël; Nicolas Lepretre; Jérôme Legall	143.06
C2	Marcus Becker/Stefan Henze (GER)	258.33	Roman Cebula/Maciej Danek (POL)	258.53	Martin Rasner/Jan Hošek (CZE)	259.30

==== Kayak ====
Event	Gold		Silver		Bronze	
K1	Miha Terdič (SLO)	216.20	Michael Kurt (SUI)	216.53	Peter Cibák (SVK)	218.03
K1 team	Germany; Jakobus Stenglein; Klaas Pannewig; Rene Mühlmann	116.79	Switzerland; Michael Kurt; Sami Bohnenblust; Thomas Mosimann	120.31	France; Benoît Peschier; Fabien Lefèvre; Julien Billaut	123.53

=== Women ===
==== Kayak ====
Event	Gold		Silver		Bronze	
K1	Hana Pešková (CZE)	254.94	Claudia Bär (GER)	265.28	Kimberley Walsh (GBR)	265.51
K1 team	Czech Republic; Hana Pešková; Marie Řihošková; Petra Semerádová	144.91	Germany; Jennifer Bongardt; Claudia Bär; Iris Gebhard	155.98	United States; Hannah Larsen; Aleta Miller; Anna Jorgensen	161.80

== Medal table ==
Rank	Nation	Gold	Silver	Bronze	Total
1	Germany (GER)	3	2	0	5
2	Czech Republic (CZE)	3	0	1	4
3	Slovenia (SLO)	1	1	1	3
4	Switzerland (SUI)	0	2	0	2
5	Slovakia (SVK)	0	1	1	2
6	Poland (POL)	0	1	0	1
7	France (FRA)	0	0	2	2
8	Great Britain (GBR)	0	0	1	1
8	United States (USA)	0	0	1	1
Totals (9 entries)		7	7	7	21
