= Dana Mann =

Slovak-born American slalom canoeist (born 1984)

Personal information
- Nationality: Slovak
- Born: Dana Beňušová; September 6, 1984 (age 41) Bratislava, Czechoslovakia
- Years active: 2000-2015

Sport
- Country: Slovakia, United States
- Sport: Canoe slalom
- Event: K1
Medal record
Women's canoe slalom
Representing Slovakia
World Championships
Gold medal – first place	2011 Bratislava	K1 team
European Championships
Bronze medal – third place	2010 Bratislava	K1 team
Bronze medal – third place	2011 La Seu d'Urgell	K1 team
Bronze medal – third place	2012 Augsburg	K1 team
U23 European Championships
Silver medal – second place	2005 Kraków	K1 team
Bronze medal – third place	2004 Kraków	K1
Junior World Championships
Silver medal – second place	2000 Bratislava	K1 team
Junior European Championships
Bronze medal – third place	2001 Bratislava	K1 team

Dana Mann (née Beňušová, born September 6, 1984, in Bratislava) is a Slovak-born American slalom canoeist who competed at the international level from 2000 to 2015, specializing in the K1 discipline. She represented the United States from 2013 to 2015.

She won a gold medal in the K1 team event at the 2011 ICF Canoe Slalom World Championships in Bratislava. She also won three consecutive bronze medals in the K1 team event at the European Championships from 2010 to 2012.

She finished 2nd in the overall World Cup standings in the K1 discipline in 2011. It was during that season that she earned her only World Cup medal with a second place finish in Tacen.

Dana is the older sister of Matej Beňuš, two-time Olympic medalist, multiple world medalist and world cup champion in C1. Her mother Jana Kubovčáková is also a medalist from World Championships in canoe slalom. She married the American K1 slalom paddler Scott Mann in 2010.

== Career statistics ==
=== Major championships results timeline ===
Representing Slovakia from 2002 to 2012 and United States from 2013 to 2015.

Event		2002	2003	2004	2005	2006	2007	2008	2009	2010	2011	2012	2013	2014	2015
World Championships	K1	—	—	Not held	—	—	—	Not held	—	11	8	Not held	5	23	44
World Championships	K1 team	—	—	Not held	—	—	—	Not held	—	6	1	Not held	—	10	13
European Championships	K1	—	Not held	—	—	—	—	—	—	21	18	26	Not eligible		
European Championships	K1 team	13	Not held	—	—	—	—	—	—	3	3	3	Not eligible		

=== World Cup individual podiums ===
Season	Date	Venue	Position	Event
2011	26 Jun 2011	Tacen	2nd	K1
