= Luboš Hilgert (canoeist, born 1986) =

Czech slalom canoeist (born 1986)

Medal record

Men's canoe slalom

Representing Czech Republic

World Championships
Bronze medal – third place	2007 Foz do Iguaçu	K1 team

U23 European Championships
Bronze medal – third place	2005 Kraków	K1 team
Bronze medal – third place	2007 Kraków	K1 team

Junior World Championships
Bronze medal – third place	2004 Lofer	K1 team

Junior European Championships
Silver medal – second place	2004 Kraków	K1

Luboš Hilgert (born 17 December 1986) is a Czech slalom canoeist who competed at the international level from 2004 to 2018.

He won a bronze medal in the K1 team event at the 2007 ICF Canoe Slalom World Championships in Foz do Iguaçu.

He is the son of successful canoe slalom paddlers Štěpánka Hilgertová and Luboš Hilgert. Amálie Hilgertová is his cousin.

== World Cup individual podiums ==
Season	Date	Venue	Position	Event
2010	20 Jun 2010	Prague	2nd	K1
2011	2 Jul 2011	L'Argentière-la-Bessée	3rd	K1
