= 2001 European Junior Canoe Slalom Championships =

- Location: Bratislava, Slovakia

The 2001 European Junior Canoe Slalom Championships were the 4th edition of the European Junior Canoe Slalom Championships. The event took place in Bratislava, Slovakia from 6 to 8 July 2001 under the auspices of the European Canoe Association (ECA) at the Čunovo Water Sports Centre. A total of 8 medal events took place.

== Medal summary ==
=== Men ===
==== Canoe ====
Event	Gold		Silver		Bronze	
C1	Alexander Slafkovský (SVK)	226.65	Krzysztof Supowicz (POL)	227.26	Grzegorz Kiljanek (POL)	236.64
C1 team	Poland; Krzysztof Supowicz; Grzegorz Kiljanek; Jarosław Chwastowicz	271.89	France; Nicolas Peschier; Hervé Chevrier; Mathieu Voyemant	288.49	Slovakia; Alexander Slafkovský; Milan Hrobský; Tomáš Kučera	290.62
C2	David Schröder/Philipp Bergner (GER)	253.28	Remy Gaspard/Julien Gaspard (FRA)	256.42	Martin Hammer/Ladislav Vlček (CZE)	259.30
C2 team	Germany; Felix Michel/Sebastian Piersig; Karsten Möller/Enrico Scherzer; David Schröder/Philipp Bergner	317.72	Poland; Grzegorz Kij/Marcin Kij; Michał Kozial/Jakub Sierota; Marcin Pochwała/Paweł Sarna	351.41	Czech Republic; Jan Merenus/Ladislav Bouška; Martin Hammer/Ladislav Vlček; Viktor Vácha/Štěpán Sehnal	389.50

==== Kayak ====
Event	Gold		Silver		Bronze	
K1	Daniele Molmenti (ITA)	216.16	Jens Ewald (GER)	217.48	Lukáš Kubričan (CZE)	217.65
K1 team	Germany; Jens Ewald; Erik Pfannmöller; Robert Süssenbach	256.17	Czech Republic; Lukáš Kubričan; Jindřich Beneš; Václav Kabrhel	270.90	Spain; Marc Domenjó; Ander Diez Lizarribar; Antonio Cadena Sánchez	285.03

=== Women ===
==== Kayak ====
Event	Gold		Silver		Bronze	
K1	Katharina Volke (GER)	247.39	Kateřina Hošková (CZE)	258.94	Nina Mozetič (SLO)	260.95
K1 team	Slovenia; Nina Mozetič; Tina Sulič; Petra Stojilov	344.42	Germany; Katharina Volke; Anika Kerkmann; Melanie Gelbhaar	355.48	Slovakia; Jana Dukátová; Dana Beňušová; Anna Zererová	364.94

== Medal table ==
Rank	Nation	Gold	Silver	Bronze	Total
1	Germany (GER)	4	2	0	6
2	Poland (POL)	1	2	1	4
3	Slovakia (SVK)	1	0	2	3
4	Slovenia (SLO)	1	0	1	2
5	Italy (ITA)	1	0	0	1
6	Czech Republic (CZE)	0	2	3	5
7	France (FRA)	0	2	0	2
8	Spain (ESP)	0	0	1	1
Totals (8 entries)		8	8	8	24
