= Andrea Romeo =

Italian canoeist

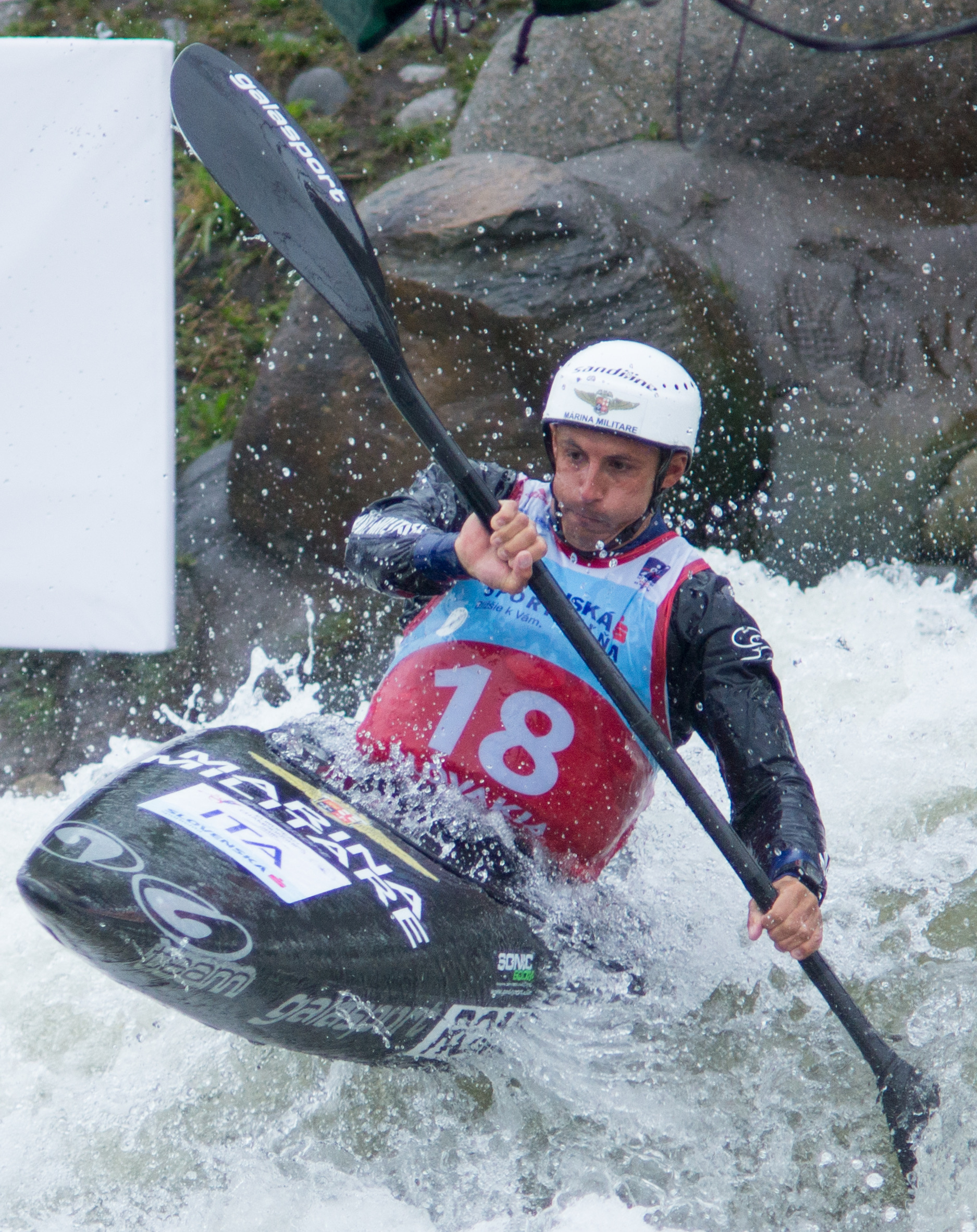
- Romeo at the 2016 European Championships

Personal information
- Born: 11 June 1985 (age 41)

Sport
- Sport: Canoe slalom
- Club: Marina Militare di Luni Sarzana
Medal record
Men's canoe slalom
Representing Italy
World Championships
Gold medal – first place	2013 Prague	K1 team
European Championships
Bronze medal – third place	2015 Markkleeberg	K1 team
U23 European Championships
Gold medal – first place	2008 Solkan	K1
Silver medal – second place	2007 Kraków	K1 team
Silver medal – second place	2008 Solkan	K1 team
Bronze medal – third place	2006 Nottingham	K1 team
Bronze medal – third place	2007 Kraków	K1

Andrea Romeo (born 11 June 1985) is an Italian slalom canoeist who competed at the international level from 2001 to 2016.

He won a gold medal in the K1 team event at the 2013 ICF Canoe Slalom World Championships in Prague. He also won a bronze medal in the same event at the 2015 European Championships in Markkleeberg.

== World Cup individual podiums ==
Season	Date	Venue	Position	Event
2014	14 Jun 2014	Tacen	2nd	K1
