= Thilo Schmitt =

German slalom canoeist (born 1982)

Medal record

Men's canoe slalom

Representing Germany

World Championships
Bronze medal – third place	2003 Augsburg	K1 team

Junior European Championships
Gold medal – first place	1999 Solkan	K1 team

Thilo Schmitt (born 1982) is a German slalom canoeist who competed at the international level from 1999 to 2003.

He won a bronze medal in the K1 team at the 2003 ICF Canoe Slalom World Championships in Augsburg.
