= 2007 European Junior and U23 Canoe Slalom Championships =

- Location: Kraków, Poland

The 2007 European Junior and U23 Canoe Slalom Championships took place in Kraków, Poland from 2 to 5 August 2007 under the auspices of the European Canoe Association (ECA) at the Kraków-Kolna Canoe Slalom Course. It was the 9th edition of the competition for Juniors (U18) and the 5th edition for the Under 23 category. A total of 15 medal events took place. The junior men's C2 team event did not take place.

== Medal summary ==
=== Men ===
==== Canoe ====
===== Junior =====
Event	Gold		Silver		Bronze	
C1	Sideris Tasiadis (GER)	212.07	Greg Pitt (GBR)	212.85	Jernej Zupan (SLO)	218.28
C1 team	Germany; Sideris Tasiadis; Franz Anton; Alexander Funk	249.64	Slovenia; Jure Lenarčič; Jernej Zupan; Blaž Cof	256.37	Czech Republic; Jan Busta; Tomáš Rak; Jiří Herink	264.44
C2	Robert Behling/Thomas Becker (GER)	233.77	Karol Kasprzak/Marcin Kasprzak (POL)	235.20	Kamil Gondek/Andrzej Poparda (POL)	236.92

===== U23 =====
Event	Gold		Silver		Bronze	
C1	Christos Tsakmakis (GRE)	206.87	Petr Karásek (CZE)	207.27	Matej Beňuš (SVK)	207.47
C1 team	Poland; Dawid Bartos; Grzegorz Hedwig; Grzegorz Kiljanek	236.20	Germany; Vitali Zirka; Martin Unger; Lukas Hoffmann	243.13	France; Denis Gargaud Chanut; Jonathan Marc; Nicolas Peschier	243.58
C2	Gauthier Klauss/Matthieu Péché (FRA)	219.95	Marcin Pochwała/Paweł Sarna (POL)	222.34	Martin Hammer/Ladislav Vlček (CZE)	224.47
C2 team	Poland; Paweł Sarna/Marcin Pochwała; Andrzej Poparda/Kamil Gondek; Dawid Dobrowolski/Dominik Węglarz	262.82	Czech Republic; Martin Hammer/Ladislav Vlček; Tomáš Koplík/Jakub Vrzáň; Petr Zdráhal/Jan Zdráhal	263.45	France; Gauthier Klauss/Matthieu Péché; Mathieu Fougere/Thomas Fougere; Hugo Biso/Pierre Picco	266.00

==== Kayak ====
===== Junior =====
Event	Gold		Silver		Bronze	
K1	Hannes Aigner (GER)	199.61	Pavel Eigel (RUS)	200.81	Étienne Daille (FRA)	203.82
K1 team	France; Vivien Colober; Paul Brier; Étienne Daille	234.70	Germany; Nils Winkler; Hannes Aigner; Sebastian Hitz	239.10	Czech Republic; Vít Přindiš; Tomáš Maslaňák; Jiří Dupal	240.87

===== U23 =====
Event	Gold		Silver		Bronze	
K1	Dariusz Popiela (POL)	196.44	Sebastian Schubert (GER)	197.29	Andrea Romeo (ITA)	198.24
K1 team	Poland; Grzegorz Polaczyk; Mateusz Polaczyk; Dariusz Popiela	224.80	Italy; Daniele Molmenti; Andrea Romeo; Riccardo De Gennaro	225.84	Czech Republic; Vavřinec Hradilek; Luboš Hilgert; Lukáš Kubričan	227.62

=== Women ===
==== Kayak ====
===== Junior =====
Event	Gold		Silver		Bronze	
K1	Cindy Pöschel (GER)	225.74	Kateřina Kudějová (CZE)	227.53	Stefanie Horn (GER)	228.54
K1 team	Czech Republic; Kateřina Kudějová; Eva Ornstová; Veronika Vojtová	271.63	Great Britain; Hannah Burgess; Alice Spencer; Claire Kimberley	289.28	Poland; Agnieszka Nosal; Anna Ingier; Oliwia Sułkowska	291.56

===== U23 =====
Event	Gold		Silver		Bronze	
K1	Melanie Pfeifer (GER)	216.40	Heike Frauenrath (GER)	220.61	Clotilde Miclo (FRA)	222.39
K1 team	Germany; Heike Frauenrath; Katja Frauenrath; Melanie Pfeifer	264.71	France; Clotilde Miclo; Carole Bouzidi; Elisa Venet	267.79	Slovenia; Urša Kragelj; Eva Terčelj; Nika Mozetič	291.49

== Medal table ==
Rank	Nation	Gold	Silver	Bronze	Total
1	Germany (GER)	7	4	1	12
2	Poland (POL)	4	2	2	8
3	France (FRA)	2	1	4	7
4	Czech Republic (CZE)	1	3	4	8
5	Greece (GRE)	1	0	0	1
6	Great Britain (GBR)	0	2	0	2
7	Slovenia (SLO)	0	1	2	3
8	Italy (ITA)	0	1	1	2
9	Russia (RUS)	0	1	0	1
10	Slovakia (SVK)	0	0	1	1
Totals (10 entries)		15	15	15	45
