= 2004 European Junior and U23 Canoe Slalom Championships =

- Location: Kraków, Poland

The 2004 European Junior and U23 Canoe Slalom Championships took place in Kraków, Poland from 10 to 12 September 2004 under the auspices of the European Canoe Association (ECA) at the Kraków-Kolna Canoe Slalom Course. It was the 6th edition of the competition for Juniors (U18) and the 2nd edition for the Under 23 category. It was also the first time that the two age categories had a joint European Championships. A total of 12 medal events took place. The team events were held as an open event for both junior and U23 athletes. Countries were allowed to enter two teams in each team event.

== Medal summary ==
=== Men ===
==== Canoe ====
===== Junior =====
| Event | Gold | | Silver | | Bronze | |
|---|---|---|---|---|---|---|
| C1 | Matej Beňuš (SVK) | 215.01 | Dawid Bartos (POL) | 218.19 | Ján Bátik (SVK) | 218.73 |
| C2 | Gauthier Klauss/Matthieu Péché (FRA) | 234.60 | Kai Müller/Kevin Müller (GER) | 234.95 | Aymeric Maynadier/Sébastien Perilhou (FRA) | 236.26 |

===== U23 =====
| Event | Gold | | Silver | | Bronze | |
|---|---|---|---|---|---|---|
| C1 | Jan Benzien (GER) | 206.73 | Lukas Hoffmann (GER) | 208.73 | Krzysztof Supowicz (POL) | 209.48 |
| C1 team | Germany; Jan Benzien; Lukas Hoffmann; Florian Beck | 219.94 | Poland; Krzysztof Supowicz; Grzegorz Kiljanek; Grzegorz Wójs | 222.00 | France; Hervé Chevrier; Eric Deguil; Pierre Labarelle | 222.48 |
| C2 | Ladislav Škantár/Peter Škantár (SVK) | 217.84 | Martin Braud/Cédric Forgit (FRA) | 220.61 | Felix Michel/Sebastian Piersig (GER) | 221.18 |
| C2 team | Poland; Marcin Pochwała/Paweł Sarna; Jarosław Miczek/Wojciech Sekuła; Bartłomiej Kruczek/Dariusz Wrzosek | 239.65 | France; Damien Troquenet/Mathieu Voyemant; Remy Gaspard/Julien Gaspard; Martin Braud/Cédric Forgit | 241.37 | Slovakia; Ladislav Škantár/Peter Škantár; Ján Šácha/Jakub Luley; Marek Marcinek/Pavol Marcinek | 250.56 |

==== Kayak ====
===== Junior =====
| Event | Gold | | Silver | | Bronze | |
|---|---|---|---|---|---|---|
| K1 | Michal Buchtel (CZE) | 201.45 | Luboš Hilgert (CZE) | 204.55 | Vavřinec Hradilek (CZE) | 205.81 |

===== U23 =====
| Event | Gold | | Silver | | Bronze | |
|---|---|---|---|---|---|---|
| K1 | Ján Šajbidor (SVK) | 197.63 | Andrej Nolimal (SLO) | 198.49 | Stefano Cipressi (ITA) | 199.94 |
| K1 team | Germany; Erik Pfannmöller; Friedemann Barthel; Fabian Dörfler | 210.21 | Slovenia; Peter Kauzer; Jure Meglič; Andrej Nolimal | 211.53 | Czech Republic; Lukáš Kubričan; Jiří Rejha; Jindřich Beneš | 213.42 |

=== Women ===
==== Kayak ====
===== Junior =====
| Event | Gold | | Silver | | Bronze | |
|---|---|---|---|---|---|---|
| K1 | Petra Slováková (CZE) | 227.90 | Corinna Kuhnle (AUT) | 231.35 | Gina Kaluza (GER) | 231.41 |

===== U23 =====
| Event | Gold | | Silver | | Bronze | |
|---|---|---|---|---|---|---|
| K1 | Jana Dukátová (SVK) | 218.55 | Maialen Chourraut (ESP) | 223.60 | Dana Beňušová (SVK) | 224.85 |
| K1 team | Czech Republic; Marie Řihošková; Kateřina Hošková; Petra Slováková | 240.07 | Germany; Gina Kaluza; Katja Frauenrath; Michaela Grimm | 241.03 | Great Britain; Michelle Patrick; Fiona Pennie; Claire Harrower | 244.67 |

== Medal table ==
| Rank | Nation | Gold | Silver | Bronze | Total |
|---|---|---|---|---|---|
| 1 | Slovakia (SVK) | 4 | 0 | 3 | 7 |
| 2 | Germany (GER) | 3 | 3 | 2 | 8 |
| 3 | Czech Republic (CZE) | 3 | 1 | 2 | 6 |
| 4 | France (FRA) | 1 | 2 | 2 | 5 |
| 5 | Poland (POL) | 1 | 2 | 1 | 4 |
| 6 | Slovenia (SLO) | 0 | 2 | 0 | 2 |
| 7 | Austria (AUT) | 0 | 1 | 0 | 1 |
| 7 | Spain (ESP) | 0 | 1 | 0 | 1 |
| 9 | Great Britain (GBR) | 0 | 0 | 1 | 1 |
| 9 | Italy (ITA) | 0 | 0 | 1 | 1 |
| Totals (10 entries) | | 12 | 12 | 12 | 36 |
