= Fabian Dörfler =

German slalom canoeist

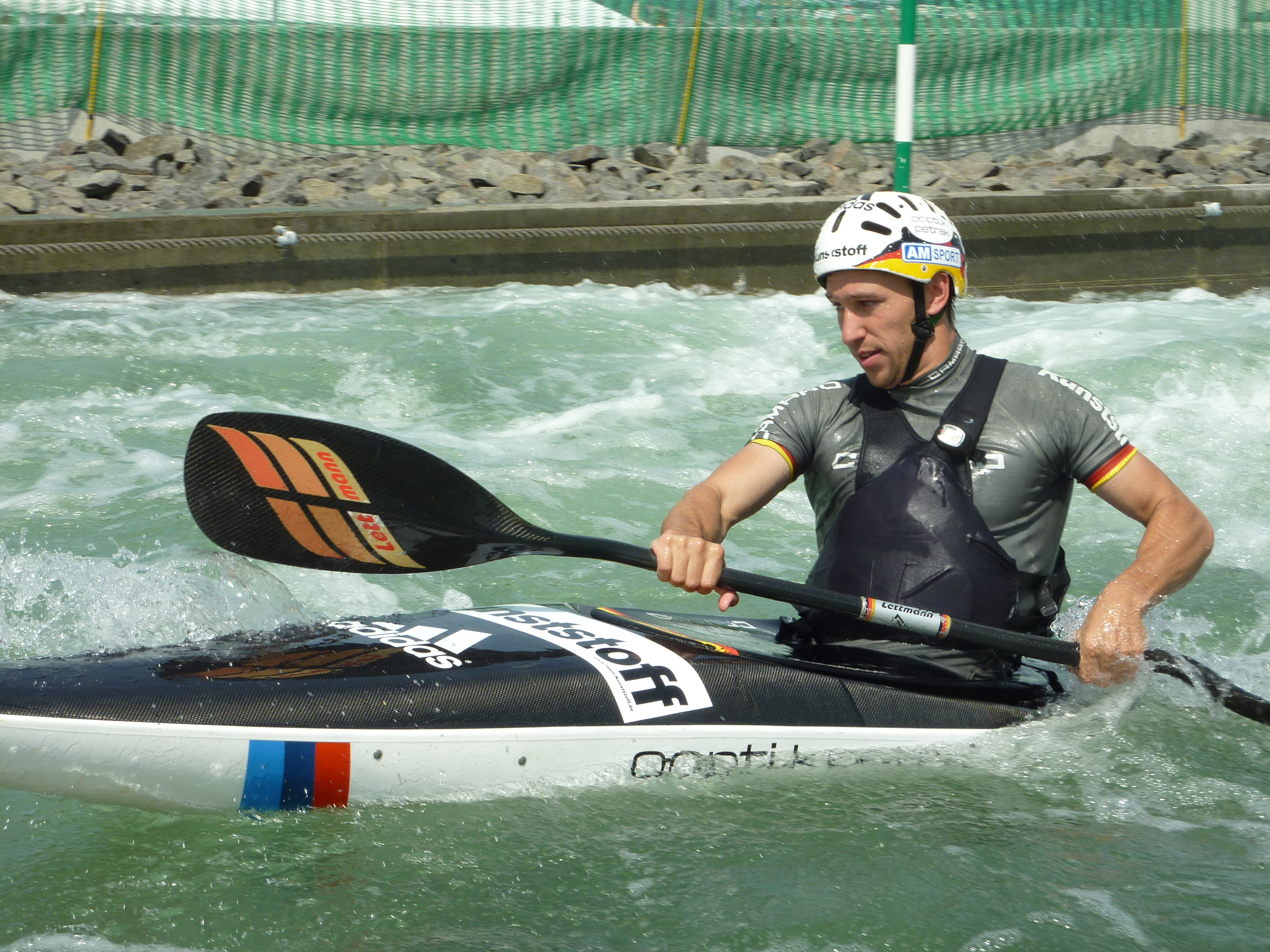

Medal record

Men's canoe slalom

Representing Germany

World Championships
Gold medal – first place	2005 Penrith	K1
Gold medal – first place	2007 Foz do Iguaçu	K1 team
Gold medal – first place	2010 Tacen	K1 team
Silver medal – second place	2007 Foz do Iguaçu	K1

European Championships
Gold medal – first place	2006 L'Argentière	K1
Gold medal – first place	2014 Vienna	K1 team
Silver medal – second place	2005 Tacen	K1 team
Silver medal – second place	2007 Liptovský	K1 team
Silver medal – second place	2013 Kraków	K1 team
Bronze medal – third place	2006 L'Argentière	K1 team
Bronze medal – third place	2008 Kraków	K1

U23 European Championships
Gold medal – first place	2004 Kraków	K1 team

Fabian Dörfler (born 8 September 1983 in Bayreuth) is a German slalom canoeist who competed at the international level from 2001 to 2014.

Dörfler won four medals at the ICF Canoe Slalom World Championships with three golds (K1: 2005; K1 team: 2007, 2010) and a silver (K1: 2007). He won the overall World Cup title in K1 in 2005 and 2007. He also won seven medals at the European Championships (2 golds, 3 silvers and 2 bronzes).

== World Cup individual podiums ==
	1st place, gold medalist(s)	2nd place, silver medalist(s)	3rd place, bronze medalist(s)	Total
K1	6	3	2	11

Season	Date	Venue	Position	Event
2005	16 July 2005	Augsburg	1st	K1
2005	2 October 2005	Penrith	1st	K1^{1}
2006	2 July 2006	L'Argentière-la-Bessée	1st	K1^{2}
2007	18 March 2007	Foz do Iguaçu	1st	K1^{3}
2007	1 July 2007	Prague	2nd	K1
2007	8 July 2007	Tacen	3rd	K1
2012	23 June 2012	La Seu d'Urgell	2nd	K1
2012	25 August 2012	Prague	3rd	K1
2013	22 June 2013	Cardiff	1st	K1
2013	17 August 2013	Tacen	2nd	K1
2014	14 June 2014	Tacen	1st	K1

^{1} World Championship counting for World Cup points
^{2} European Championship counting for World Cup points
^{3} Pan American Championship counting for World Cup points
