= Jana Kubovčáková =

Slovak slalom canoeist

Medal record

Women's canoe slalom

Representing Czechoslovakia

World Championships
Bronze medal – third place	1975 Skopje	K1 team

Jana Kubovčáková (married Beňušová; born 23 January 1955) is a Slovak retired slalom canoeist who competed for Czechoslovakia in the 1970s.

Kubovčáková participated in two World Championships, winning a bronze medal in the K1 team event at the 1975 World Championships in Skopje.

Her son Matej Beňuš is a two-time Olympic medalist in canoe slalom and her daughter Dana Mann is K1 team world champion from 2011.

== Major championships results timeline ==
Event		1975	1976	1977
World Championships	K1	18	Not held	19
World Championships	K1 team	3	Not held	5
