= Edern Le Ruyet =

French canoeist

Personal information
- Born: 14 May 1987 (age 39)
- Height: 170 cm (5 ft 7 in)
- Weight: 66 kg (146 lb)
Medal record
Men's canoe slalom
Representing France
World Championships
Bronze medal – third place	2017 Pau	C1 team
U23 European Championships
Bronze medal – third place	2008 Solkan	C1 team

Edern Le Ruyet (born 14 May 1987) is a French slalom canoeist who has competed at the international level since 2004. He competes in C1 and C2. His partner in the C2 boat is Pierre-Antoine Tillard.

He won a bronze medal in the C1 team event at the 2017 ICF Canoe Slalom World Championships in Pau.

== World Cup individual podiums ==
Season	Date	Venue	Position	Event
2010	20 Feb 2010	Penrith	1st	C1^{1}
2015	28 Jun 2015	Kraków	3rd	C2
2016	12 Jun 2016	La Seu d'Urgell	1st	C2
2016	19 Jun 2016	Pau	1st	C2

^{1} Oceania Canoe Slalom Open counting for World Cup points
