= Thomas Koechlin =

Swiss canoeist (born 1991)

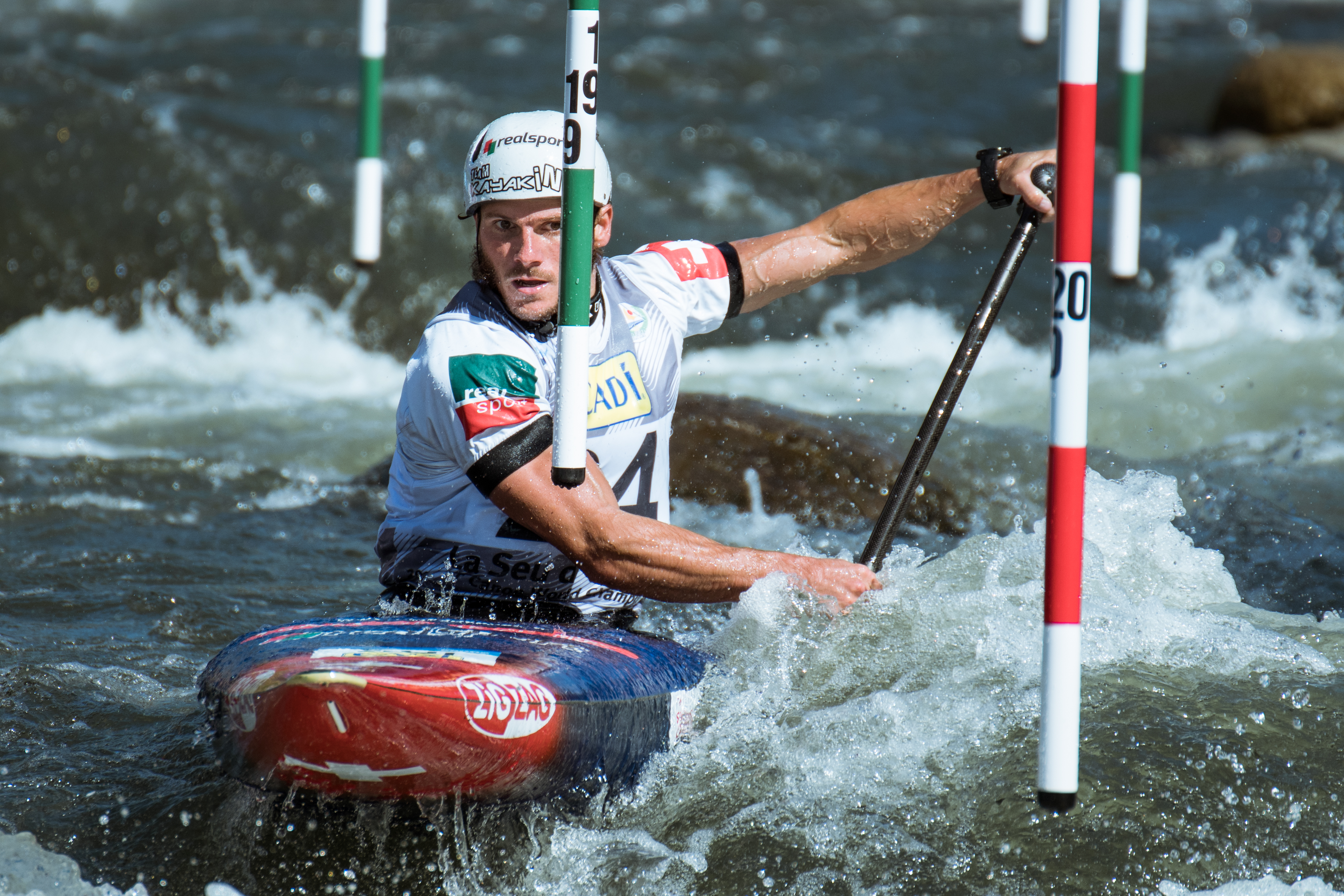
- Koechlin at the 2019 World Championships

Personal information
- Nationality: Swiss
- Born: 4 October 1991 (age 34) Singapore
- Height: 169 cm (5 ft 7 in)
- Weight: 73 kg (161 lb)

Sport
- Club: Canoe Club Genève
Medal record
Men's canoe slalom
Representing Switzerland
European Championships
Silver medal – second place	2017 Tacen	C1

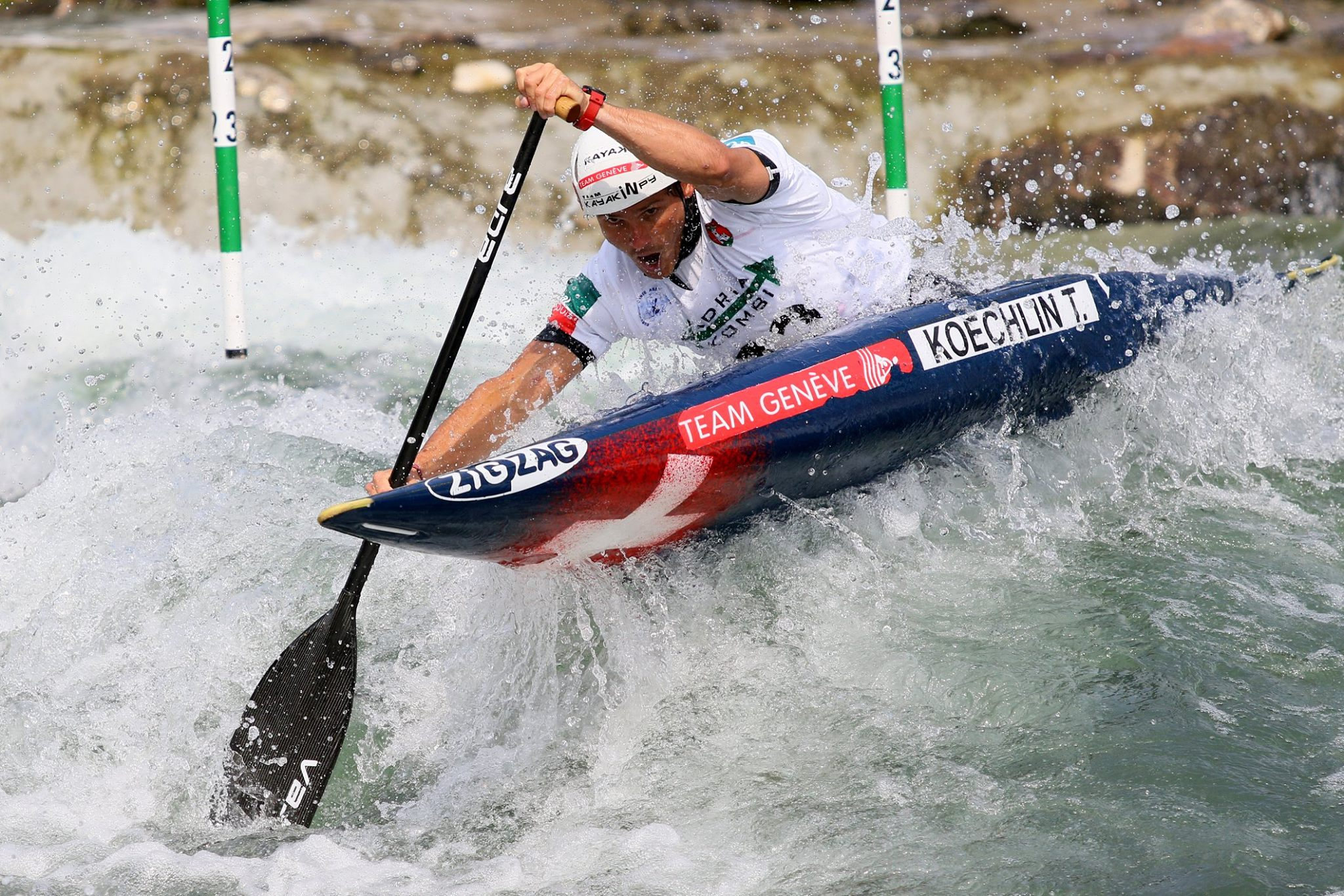
Thomas Koechlin (2017)

Thomas Koechlin (born 4 October 1991) is a Swiss slalom canoeist who has competed at the international level since 2012.

Koechlin won a silver medal in the C1 event at the 2017 European Championships in Tacen. He competed at the 2020 Summer Olympics, finishing in 13th place in the C1 event after being eliminated in the semifinal.

== World Cup individual podiums ==
Season	Date	Venue	Position	Event
2016	4 June 2016	Ivrea	2nd	C1
2020	8 November 2020	Pau	3rd	C1
