= Dejan Stevanovič =

Slovenian slalom canoeist (born 1976)

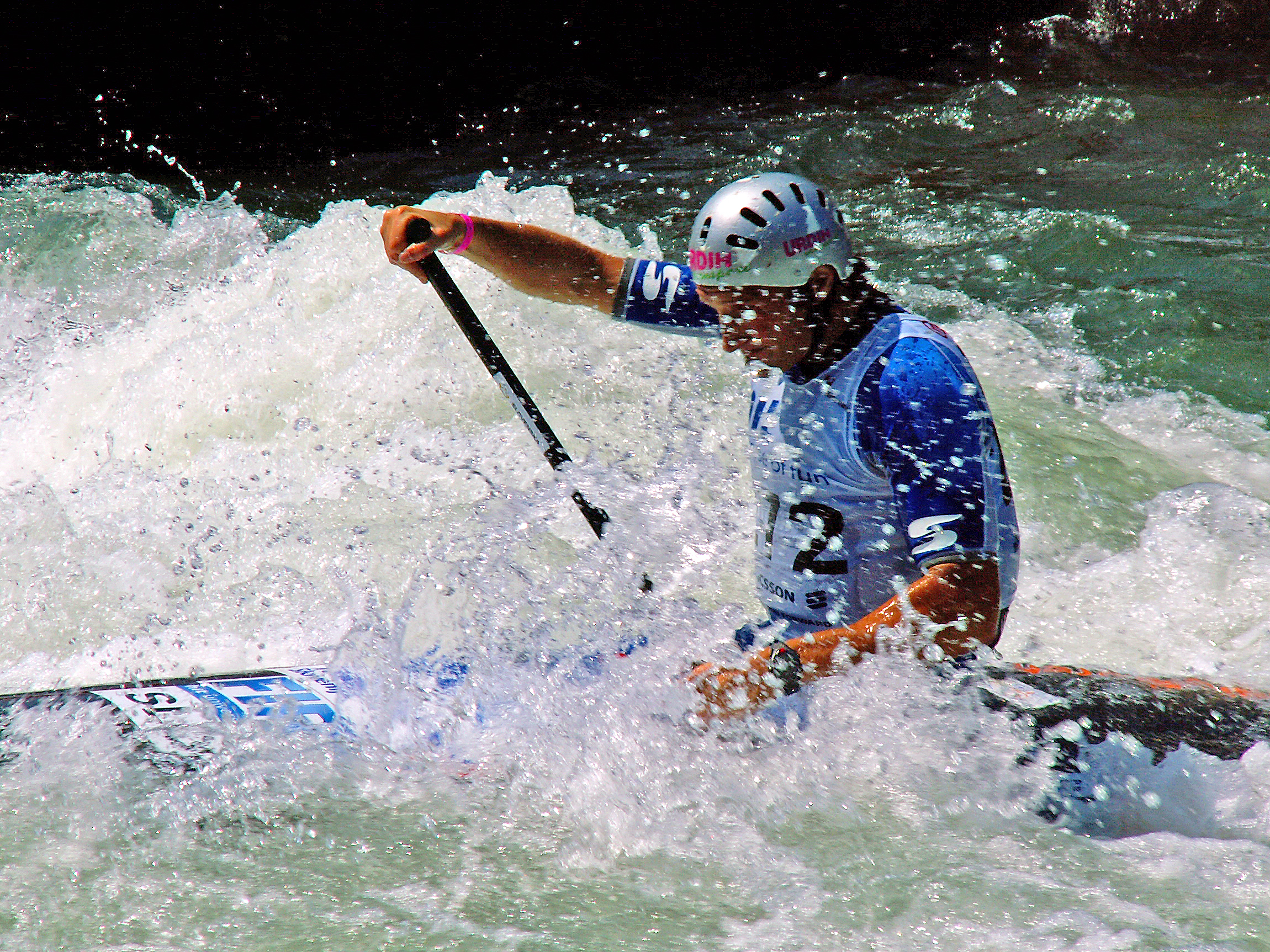

Medal record

Men's canoe slalom

Representing Slovenia

World Championships
Bronze medal – third place	2002 Bourg St.-Maurice	C1 team

European Championships
Bronze medal – third place	1996 Augsburg	C1 team
Bronze medal – third place	2004 Skopje	C1 team

Junior World Championships
Bronze medal – third place	1992 Sjoa	C1 team
Bronze medal – third place	1994 Wausau	C1

Dejan Stevanovič (born 30 November 1976) is a Slovenian slalom canoeist who competed at the international level from 1992 to 2010.

He won a bronze medal in the C1 team event at the 2002 ICF Canoe Slalom World Championships in Bourg St.-Maurice. He also won 2 bronze medals in the same event at the European Championships.

== World Cup individual podiums ==
Season	Date	Venue	Position	Event
2004	30 May 2004	Merano	2nd	C1
2007	8 Jul 2007	Tacen	2nd	C1
