= Jakobus Stenglein =

German slalom canoeist (born 1980)

Medal record

Men's canoe slalom

Representing Germany

World Championships
Gold medal – first place	1999 La Seu d'Urgell	K1 team

Junior World Championships
Gold medal – first place	1998 Lofer	K1 team

Jakobus Stenglein (born 1980) is a German slalom canoeist who competed at the international level from 1998 to 1999.

He won a gold medal in the K1 team event at the 1999 ICF Canoe Slalom World Championships in La Seu d'Urgell.
