= Martin Braud =

French slalom canoeist

Medal record

Men's canoe slalom

Representing France

World Championships
Silver medal – second place	2007 Foz do Iguaçu	C2 team

European Championships
Gold medal – first place	2006 L'Argentière-la-Bessée	C2
Silver medal – second place	2002 Bratislava	C2 team
Silver medal – second place	2004 Skopje	C2
Silver medal – second place	2006 L'Argentière-la-Bessée	C2 team
Bronze medal – third place	2005 Tacen	C2 team

U23 European Championships
Silver medal – second place	2004 Kraków	C2
Silver medal – second place	2004 Kraków	C2 team
Bronze medal – third place	2002 Bratislava	C2

Junior World Championships
Gold medal – first place	2000 Bratislava	C2
Gold medal – first place	2000 Bratislava	C2 team

Junior European Championships
Gold medal – first place	1999 Solkan	C2 team
Silver medal – second place	1999 Solkan	C2

Martin Braud (born 6 January 1982 in Angoulême) is a French slalom canoeist who competed at the international level from 1998 to 2008.

== Career ==
Braud won a silver medal in the C2 team event at the 2007 ICF Canoe Slalom World Championships. He also won five medals at the European Championships (1 gold, 3 silvers and 1 bronze).

Braud finished fourth in the C2 event at the 2008 Summer Olympics in Beijing.

His partner in the C2 boat throughout his active career was Cédric Forgit.

== World Cup individual podiums ==
Season	Date	Venue	Position	Event
2004	25 Apr 2004	Athens	2nd	C2
2006	2 Jul 2006	L'Argentière-la-Bessée	1st	C2^{1}
2007	18 Mar 2007	Foz do Iguaçu	3rd	C2^{2}
2008	22 Jun 2008	Prague	3rd	C2

^{1} European Championship counting for World Cup points
^{2} Pan American Championship counting for World Cup points
