= Jens Ewald =

German slalom canoeist (born 1983)

Medal record

Men's canoe slalom

Representing Germany

U23 European Championships
Silver medal – second place	2006 Nottingham	K1 team

Junior World Championships
Silver medal – second place	2000 Bratislava	K1

Junior European Championships
Gold medal – first place	2001 Bratislava	K1 team
Silver medal – second place	2001 Bratislava	K1

Jens Ewald (born 30 July 1983 in Schwerte) is a German slalom canoeist who competed at the international level from 2000 to 2008.

Competing at the 2004 Summer Olympics in Athens in the K1 event, he finished 25th in the qualification round, failing to progress to the semifinals.

== World Cup individual podiums ==
Season	Date	Venue	Position	Event
2008	16 Mar 2008	Penrith	1st	K1^{1}

^{1} Oceania Championship counting for World Cup points
