= Přemysl Vlk =

Medal record

Men's canoe slalom

Representing Czech Republic

World Championships
Gold medal – first place	2002 Bourg St.-Maurice	C1 team

European Championships
Silver medal – second place	2000 Mezzana	C1 team

Junior World Championships
Silver medal – second place	2000 Bratislava	C1
Bronze medal – third place	2000 Bratislava	C1 team

Junior European Championships
Gold medal – first place	1999 Solkan	C1
Silver medal – second place	1999 Solkan	C1 team

Přemysl Vlk (1982–2003) was a Czech slalom canoeist who competed at the international from 1997 until his death in 2003.

He won a gold medal in the C1 team event at the 2002 ICF Canoe Slalom World Championships in Bourg-Saint-Maurice and a silver medal in the same event at the 2000 European Championships in Mezzana.

Vlk died in a car crash on 13 July 2003 together with fellow Czech canoeist Daniel Vladař.
