= Nina Mozetič =

Slovenian canoeist

Medal record

Women's canoe slalom

Representing Slovenia

World Championships
Bronze medal – third place	2010 Tacen	K1 team

Junior World Championships
Silver medal – second place	2000 Bratislava	K1

Junior European Championships
Gold medal – first place	1999 Solkan	K1 team
Gold medal – first place	2001 Bratislava	K1 team
Bronze medal – third place	2001 Bratislava	K1

Nina Mozetič (born 1983) is a Slovenian slalom canoeist who competed at the international level from 1997 to 2012.

She won a bronze medal in the K1 team event at the 2010 ICF Canoe Slalom World Championships in Tacen.

== World Cup individual podiums ==
Season	Date	Venue	Position	Event
2009	3 Aug 2009	Kananaskis	2nd	K1^{1}

^{1} Pan American Championship counting for World Cup points
