= Paweł Sarna (canoeist) =

Polish canoeist

Medal record

Men's canoe slalom

Representing Poland

World Championships
Bronze medal – third place	2003 Augsburg	C2 team

European Championships
Silver medal – second place	2008 Kraków	C2 team
Silver medal – second place	2010 Bratislava	C2 team
Bronze medal – third place	2007 Liptovský Mikuláš	C2 team
Bronze medal – third place	2009 Nottingham	C2 team

U23 European Championships
Gold medal – first place	2004 Kraków	C2 team
Gold medal – first place	2005 Kraków	C2 team
Gold medal – first place	2007 Kraków	C2 team
Silver medal – second place	2007 Kraków	C2

Junior World Championships
Silver medal – second place	2002 Nowy Sącz	C2
Silver medal – second place	2002 Nowy Sącz	C2 team

Junior European Championships
Silver medal – second place	2001 Bratislava	C2 team

Paweł Michał Sarna (born 12 June 1984 in Nowy Sącz) is a Polish slalom canoeist who competed at the international level from 2000 to 2010, predominantly in the C2 category.

He won a bronze medal in the C2 team event at the 2003 ICF Canoe Slalom World Championships in Augsburg. He also won two silvers and two bronzes in the same event at the European Championships.

Competing in two Summer Olympics, he earned his best finish of eighth in the C2 event in Beijing in 2008.

He changed C2 partners several times during his career. He had most success competing alongside Marcin Pochwała (2001-2008), but he also raced alongside Grzegorz Wójs (2009) and Dawid Dobrowolski (2010).
