= 2005 European Junior and U23 Canoe Slalom Championships =

- Location: Kraków, Poland

The 2005 European Junior and U23 Canoe Slalom Championships took place in Kraków, Poland from 18 to 21 August 2005 under the auspices of the European Canoe Association (ECA) at the Kraków-Kolna Canoe Slalom Course. It was the 7th edition of the competition for Juniors (U18) and the 3rd edition for the Under 23 category. A total of 16 medal events took place.

== Medal summary ==
=== Men ===
==== Canoe ====
===== Junior =====
Event	Gold		Silver		Bronze	
C1	Norbert Neveu (FRA)	221.15	Christos Tsakmakis (GRE)	227.17	Denis Gargaud Chanut (FRA)	227.79
C1 team	France; Denis Gargaud Chanut; Jonathan Marc; Norbert Neveu	232.58	Poland; Dawid Bartos; Krzysztof Borzędzki; Grzegorz Hedwig	237.79	Germany; Sideris Tasiadis; Stephan Borchert; Rico Massalski	243.55
C2	Gauthier Klauss/Matthieu Péché (FRA)	255.40	Hugo Biso/Pierre Picco (FRA)	259.01	Maxime Janin/Yoann Janin (FRA)	261.14
C2 team	Germany; Kai Müller/Kevin Müller; Martin Schmidt/Paul Jork; Michael Greim/Otto-Max Klein	290.65	Poland; Dawid Dobrowolski/Piotr Szczepański; Grzegorz Kwiatek/Michał Salamon; Jacek Jancewicz/Piotr Pytel	293.74	Slovakia; Marek Vršanský/Richard Vršanský; Lukáš Gajarský/Juraj Ontko; Tomáš Hons/Tomáš Frátrik	299.74

===== U23 =====
Event	Gold		Silver		Bronze	
C1	Grzegorz Wójs (POL)	219.41	Hervé Chevrier (FRA)	219.84	Alexander Slafkovský (SVK)	221.05
C1 team	Poland; Krzysztof Supowicz; Grzegorz Wójs; Grzegorz Kiljanek	221.74	Germany; Timo Wirsching; Martin Unger; Lukas Hoffmann	229.48	Great Britain; David Florence; Adam Marshall; Daniel Goddard	232.49
C2	Ladislav Škantár/Peter Škantár (SVK)	236.78	Mathieu Voyemant/Damien Troquenet (FRA)	236.82	Jarosław Miczek/Wojciech Sekuła (POL)	237.28
C2 team	Poland; Bartłomiej Kruczek/Dariusz Wrzosek; Paweł Sarna/Marcin Pochwała; Jarosław Miczek/Wojciech Sekuła	245.94	Czech Republic; Martin Hammer/Ladislav Vlček; Tomáš Koplík/Jakub Vrzáň; Václav Hradilek/Štěpán Sehnal	252.04	Germany; Felix Michel/Sebastian Piersig; Daniel Junker/Martin Krenzer; Michael Bartsch/Michael Wiedemann	255.70

==== Kayak ====
===== Junior =====
Event	Gold		Silver		Bronze	
K1	Sebastian Schubert (GER)	216.84	Mateusz Polaczyk (POL)	217.02	Sébastien Combot (FRA)	217.70
K1 team	France; Sébastien Combot; Benoît Guillaume; Florian Berail	221.89	Czech Republic; Vavřinec Hradilek; Vít Přindiš; Jan Vondra	225.49	Germany; Sebastian Schubert; Max Pernreiter; Paul Böckelmann	225.67

===== U23 =====
Event	Gold		Silver		Bronze	
K1	Daniele Molmenti (ITA)	206.73	Grzegorz Polaczyk (POL)	208.98	Domenik Bartsch (GER)	211.30
K1 team	Poland; Grzegorz Polaczyk; Henryk Polaczyk; Dariusz Popiela	213.26	Italy; Daniele Molmenti; Stefano Cipressi; Diego Paolini	215.45	Czech Republic; Lukáš Kubričan; Luboš Hilgert; Jindřich Beneš	215.92

=== Women ===
==== Kayak ====
===== Junior =====
Event	Gold		Silver		Bronze	
K1	Michaela Grimm (GER)	242.07	Šárka Blažková (CZE)	243.57	Dorothée Utz (GER)	244.08
K1 team	Germany; Dorothée Utz; Michaela Grimm; Katja Frauenrath	246.02	Poland; Natalia Pacierpnik; Alicja Dudek; Agnieszka Nosal	263.04	France; Laura Mangin; Elisa Venet; Marie-Zélia Lafont	274.68

===== U23 =====
Event	Gold		Silver		Bronze	
K1	Jana Dukátová (SVK)	233.95	Melanie Pfeifer (GER)	237.41	Fiona Pennie (GBR)	241.88
K1 team	Germany; Jasmin Schornberg; Mira Louen; Melanie Pfeifer	251.94	Slovakia; Jana Dukátová; Katarína Macová; Dana Beňušová	255.60	France; Carole Bouzidi; Clotilde Miclo; Émilie Fer	256.56

== Medal table ==
Rank	Nation	Gold	Silver	Bronze	Total
1	Germany (GER)	5	2	5	12
2	Poland (POL)	4	5	1	10
3	France (FRA)	4	3	5	12
4	Slovakia (SVK)	2	1	2	5
5	Italy (ITA)	1	1	0	2
6	Czech Republic (CZE)	0	3	1	4
7	Greece (GRE)	0	1	0	1
8	Great Britain (GBR)	0	0	2	2
Totals (8 entries)		16	16	16	48
