= Grzegorz Kiljanek =

Polish canoeist

Personal information
- Born: 9 August 1984 (age 41) Nowe Miasto nad Pilicą, Poland
Medal record
Men's canoe slalom
Representing Poland
European Championships
Silver medal – second place	2008 Kraków	C1 team
U23 European Championships
Gold medal – first place	2005 Kraków	C1 team
Gold medal – first place	2006 Nottingham	C1 team
Gold medal – first place	2007 Kraków	C1 team
Silver medal – second place	2004 Kraków	C1 team
Junior World Championships
Gold medal – first place	2000 Bratislava	C1 team
Gold medal – first place	2002 Nowy Sącz	C1 team
Junior European Championships
Gold medal – first place	2001 Bratislava	C1 team
Bronze medal – third place	2001 Bratislava	C1

Grzegorz Kiljanek (born 9 August 1984 in Nowe Miasto nad Pilicą) is a Polish slalom canoeist who competed at the international level from 2000 to 2012.

He won a silver medal in the C1 team event at the 2008 European Championships in Kraków. At the 2012 Summer Olympics he competed in the C1 event where he finished in 9th place after being eliminated in the semifinal.

== World Cup individual podiums ==
Season	Date	Venue	Position	Event
2012	16 Jun 2012	Pau	2nd	C1
