= Marie Řihošková =

Czech slalom canoeist

Medal record

Women's canoe slalom

Representing Czech Republic

World Championships
Gold medal – first place	2010 Tacen	K1 team
Silver medal – second place	2002 Bourg St.-Maurice	K1 team
Silver medal – second place	2006 Prague	K1 team

European Championships
Gold medal – first place	2002 Bratislava	K1 team
Silver medal – second place	2006 L'Argentière-la-Bessée	K1 team
Silver medal – second place	2008 Kraków	K1

U23 European Championships
Gold medal – first place	2004 Kraków	K1 team

Junior World Championships
Gold medal – first place	1998 Lofer	K1 team

Junior European Championships
Silver medal – second place	1999 Solkan	K1
Silver medal – second place	1999 Solkan	K1 team

Marie Řihošková (born 1981) is a Czech slalom canoeist who competed at the international from 1997 to 2010.

She won three medals in the K1 team event at the ICF Canoe Slalom World Championships with a gold (2010) and two silvers (2002, 2006). She also won three medals at the European Championships (1 gold and 2 silvers).

== World Cup individual podiums ==
Season	Date	Venue	Position	Event
2003	13 Jul 2003	Tacen	2nd	K1
2007	18 Mar 2007	Foz do Iguaçu	1st	K1^{1}
2008	6 Jul 2008	Augsburg	3rd	K1

^{1} Pan American Championship counting for World Cup points
