= Pierre Labarelle =

French canoeist (born 1982)

Medal record

Men's canoe slalom

Representing France

World Championships
Gold medal – first place	2005 Penrith	C1 team
Gold medal – first place	2007 Foz do Iguaçu	C1 team
Gold medal – first place	2011 Bratislava	C2 team
Gold medal – first place	2014 Deep Creek Lake	C2 team

European Championships
Gold medal – first place	2013 Kraków	C2
Gold medal – first place	2013 Kraków	C2 team
Silver medal – second place	2007 Liptovský Mikuláš	C1
Silver medal – second place	2011 La Seu d'Urgell	C2
Silver medal – second place	2014 Vienna	C2 team
Bronze medal – third place	2007 Liptovský Mikuláš	C1 team

U23 European Championships
Bronze medal – third place	2004 Kraków	C1 team

Junior World Championships
Silver medal – second place	2000 Bratislava	C1 team

Pierre Labarelle (born 19 September 1982) is a French slalom canoeist who competed at the international level from 1999 to 2015. In the early part of his career he was specializing on the C1 class. He started competing in the C2 class in 2011 when he teamed up with Nicolas Peschier.

He won four gold medals at the ICF Canoe Slalom World Championships (C1 team: 2005, 2007; C2 team: 2011, 2014). He also won six medals at the European Championships (2 golds, 3 silvers and 1 bronze).

Labarelle won the overall World Cup title in the C2 class in 2012.

== World Cup individual podiums ==
Season	Date	Venue	Position	Event
2011	10 Jul 2011	Markkleeberg	2nd	C2
2012	17 Jun 2012	Pau	1st	C2
2012	24 Jun 2012	La Seu d'Urgell	1st	C2
2012	26 Aug 2012	Prague	1st	C2
2012	2 Sep 2012	Bratislava	3rd	C2
2013	7 Jul 2013	La Seu d'Urgell	2nd	C2
2014	3 Aug 2014	La Seu d'Urgell	2nd	C2
2015	9 Aug 2015	La Seu d'Urgell	2nd	C2
