= Pierre-Antoine Tillard =

French slalom canoeist (born 1986)

Personal information
- Born: 19 September 1986 (age 39)
Medal record
Men's canoe slalom
Representing France
European Championships
Gold medal – first place	2018 Prague	C1 team
Bronze medal – third place	2018 Prague	C2 team
U23 European Championships
Silver medal – second place	2009 Liptovský Mikuláš	C1 team

Pierre-Antoine Tillard (born 19 September 1986) is a French slalom canoeist who has competed at the international level since 2009. He competes in C1 and C2. His partner in the C2 boat is usually Edern Le Ruyet.

He won a gold and a bronze medal at the 2018 European Championships in Prague. He finished third in the overall World Cup rankings in the C2 class in 2016. He was the Olympic substitute for the C1 event at the 2016 Summer Olympics in Rio de Janeiro.

== World Cup individual podiums ==
Season	Date	Venue	Position	Event
2015	28 Jun 2015	Kraków	3rd	C2
2015	15 Aug 2015	Pau	1st	C1
2016	12 Jun 2016	La Seu d'Urgell	1st	C2
2016	19 Jun 2016	Pau	1st	C2
