= David Schröder =

German canoeist

Personal information
- Born: 28 April 1985 (age 41) Leipzig, East Germany
- Height: 180 cm (5 ft 11 in)
- Weight: 70 kg (154 lb)

Sport
- Sport: Canoe slalom
Medal record
Men's canoe slalom
Representing Germany
World Championships
Silver medal – second place	2009 La Seu d'Urgell	C2 team
Bronze medal – third place	2010 Tacen	C2 team
European Championships
Gold medal – first place	2006 L'Argentière-la-Bessée	C2 team
Gold medal – first place	2007 Liptovský Mikuláš	C2 team
Gold medal – first place	2008 Kraków	C2 team
Gold medal – first place	2018 Prague	C2 team
Silver medal – second place	2011 La Seu d'Urgell	C2 team
Bronze medal – third place	2012 Augsburg	C2 team
Bronze medal – third place	2016 Liptovský Mikuláš	C2
Bronze medal – third place	2016 Liptovský Mikuláš	C2 team
Junior World Championships
Gold medal – first place	2002 Nowy Sącz	C2 team
Silver medal – second place	2000 Bratislava	C2 team
Junior European Championships
Gold medal – first place	2001 Bratislava	C2
Gold medal – first place	2001 Bratislava	C2 team

David Schröder (also spelled Schroeder, born 28 April 1985 in Leipzig) is a German slalom canoeist who has competed at the international level since 2000.

He won two medals in the C2 team event at the ICF Canoe Slalom World Championships with a silver in 2009 and a bronze in 2010. He also won 8 medals at the European Championships (4 golds, 1 silver and 3 bronzes).

At the 2012 Summer Olympics he competed in the C2 event. He did not advance to the semifinals after finishing 11th in the qualifying round.

His partner from 2005 to 2013 was Frank Henze. Since 2014 he has been paddling with Nico Bettge.

== World Cup individual podiums ==
Season	Date	Venue	Position	Event
2010	3 Jul 2010	Augsburg	1st	C2
2016	5 Jun 2016	Ivrea	2nd	C2
2016	12 Jun 2016	La Seu d'Urgell	3rd	C2
2017	9 Sep 2017	La Seu d'Urgell	2nd	C2
