= Nicolas Peschier =

French slalom canoeist (born 1984)

Personal information
- Born: 16 May 1984 (age 42) Guilherand-Granges, France
- Height: 170 cm (5 ft 7 in)
- Weight: 78 kg (172 lb)

Sport
- Club: Vallon Pont d'Arc
- Coached by: Yann Le Pennec
Medal record
Men's canoe slalom
Representing France
World Championships
Gold medal – first place	2007 Foz do Iguaçu	C1 team
Gold medal – first place	2011 Bratislava	C2 team
Gold medal – first place	2014 Deep Creek Lake	C2 team
Silver medal – second place	2009 La Seu d'Urgell	C1 team
Bronze medal – third place	2013 Prague	C1 team
European Championships
Gold medal – first place	2011 La Seu d'Urgell	C1 team
Gold medal – first place	2013 Kraków	C2
Gold medal – first place	2013 Kraków	C2 team
Silver medal – second place	2009 Nottingham	C1 team
Silver medal – second place	2011 La Seu d'Urgell	C2
Silver medal – second place	2014 Vienna	C2 team
Bronze medal – third place	2007 Liptovský Mikuláš	C1 team
Bronze medal – third place	2010 Bratislava	C1 team
U23 European Championships
Silver medal – second place	2006 Nottingham	C1
Bronze medal – third place	2007 Kraków	C1 team
Junior World Championships
Silver medal – second place	2000 Bratislava	C1 team
Junior European Championships
Silver medal – second place	2001 Bratislava	C1 team

Nicolas Peschier (born 16 May 1984 in Guilherand-Granges) is a French slalom canoeist who competed at the international level from 1999 to 2016. In the early part of his career he was specializing on the C1 class. He also competed in the C2 class from 2011 to 2015 together with Pierre Labarelle.

He won five medals at the ICF Canoe Slalom World Championships with three golds (C1 team: 2007; C2 team: 2011, 2014), a silver (C1 team: 2009) and a bronze (C1 team: 2013). He also won eight medals at the European Championships (3 golds, 3 silvers and 2 bronzes).

Peschier won the overall World Cup title in the C2 class in 2012.

Peschier competed in the C1 event at the 2004 Summer Olympics in Athens, but was eliminated in the qualifying rounds, finishing in 14th place.

His older brother Benoît is Olympic champion from the K1 event at the 2004 Summer Olympics in Athens. Their father Claude is world champion in the K1 event from 1969.

== World Cup individual podiums ==
Season	Date	Venue	Position	Event
2011	10 Jul 2011	Markkleeberg	2nd	C2
2012	17 Jun 2012	Pau	1st	C2
2012	24 Jun 2012	La Seu d'Urgell	1st	C2
2012	26 Aug 2012	Prague	1st	C2
2012	2 Sep 2012	Bratislava	3rd	C2
2013	7 Jul 2013	La Seu d'Urgell	2nd	C2
2014	3 Aug 2014	La Seu d'Urgell	2nd	C2
2015	9 Aug 2015	La Seu d'Urgell	2nd	C2
2016	18 Jun 2016	Pau	2nd	C1
