= Krzysztof Supowicz =

Polish canoeist

Medal record

Men's canoe slalom

Representing Poland

U23 European Championships
Gold medal – first place	2005 Kraków	C1 team
Gold medal – first place	2006 Nottingham	C1 team
Silver medal – second place	2004 Kraków	C1 team
Bronze medal – third place	2004 Kraków	C1

Junior World Championships
Gold medal – first place	2000 Bratislava	C1 team
Gold medal – first place	2002 Nowy Sącz	C1 team

Junior European Championships
Gold medal – first place	2001 Bratislava	C1 team
Silver medal – second place	2001 Bratislava	C1

Krzysztof Supowicz (born 13 February 1984 in Warsaw) is a Polish slalom canoeist who competed at the international level from 2000 to 2006.

At the 2004 Summer Olympics in Athens, he was eliminated in the qualifying round of the C1 event, finishing in 13th place.
