= 2000 World Junior Canoe Slalom Championships =

The 2000 ICF World Junior Canoe Slalom Championships were the 8th edition of the ICF World Junior Canoe Slalom Championships. The event took place in Bratislava, Slovakia from 13 to 16 July 2000 under the auspices of the International Canoe Federation (ICF) at the Čunovo Water Sports Centre.

== Medal summary ==
=== Men ===
==== Canoe ====
Event	Gold		Silver		Bronze	
C1	Alexander Slafkovský (SVK)	243.69	Přemysl Vlk (CZE)	243.74	Jan Benzien (GER)	256.52
C1 team	Poland; Grzegorz Wójs; Krzysztof Supowicz; Grzegorz Kiljanek	155.01	France; Pierre Labarelle; Hervé Chevrier; Nicolas Peschier	159.10	Czech Republic; Přemysl Vlk; David Chod; Václav Hradilek	163.47
C2	Martin Braud/Cédric Forgit (FRA)	274.08	Ladislav Škantár/Peter Škantár (SVK)	276.71	Julien Gaspard/Remy Gaspard (FRA)	279.53
C2 team	France; Martin Braud/Cédric Forgit; Julien Gaspard/Remy Gaspard; Guillaume Brahic/Christian Brunel	177.49	Germany; Felix Michel/Sebastian Piersig; Karsten Möller/Enrico Scherzer; Philipp Bergner/David Schröder	180.72	Czech Republic; Jan Merenus/Ladislav Bouška; Martin Hammer/Ladislav Vlček; Zdeněk Pivoňka/Pavel Arnošt	182.63

==== Kayak ====
Event	Gold		Silver		Bronze	
K1	Ján Šajbidor (SVK)	231.74	Jens Ewald (GER)	236.34	Przemysław Popis (POL)	239.16
K1 team	Slovenia; Gregor Laznik; Peter Kauzer; Žiga Ovčak	140.28	Poland; Piotr Mędoń; Jakub Małecki; Przemysław Popis	143.48	Czech Republic; Jindřich Beneš; Vladimír Pour; Lukáš Kubričan	144.60

=== Women ===
==== Kayak ====
Event	Gold		Silver		Bronze	
K1	Jennifer Bongardt (GER)	270.27	Nina Mozetič (SLO)	277.90	Fiona Pennie (GBR)	286.78
K1 team	Germany; Jennifer Bongardt; Melanie Gelbhaar; Anna Kamps	181.73	Slovakia; Janka Ovčariková; Jana Dukátová; Dana Beňušová	197.57	Great Britain; Fiona Pennie; Sarah Kinder; Debbie Lomas	198.58

== Medal table ==
Rank	Nation	Gold	Silver	Bronze	Total
1	Germany (GER)	2	2	1	5
2	Slovakia (SVK)	2	2	0	4
3	France (FRA)	2	1	1	4
4	Poland (POL)	1	1	1	3
5	Slovenia (SLO)	1	1	0	2
6	Czech Republic (CZE)	0	1	3	4
7	Great Britain (GBR)	0	0	2	2
Totals (7 entries)		8	8	8	24
