= Andrej Nolimal =

Slovenian slalom canoeist (born 1981)

Medal record

Men's canoe slalom

Representing Slovenia

World Championships
Bronze medal – third place	2005 Penrith	K1 team

European Championships
Gold medal – first place	2005 Tacen	K1 team

U23 European Championships
Silver medal – second place	2004 Kraków	K1
Silver medal – second place	2004 Kraków	K1 team

Junior European Championships
Silver medal – second place	1999 Solkan	K1

Andrej Nolimal (born 1981) is a Slovenian slalom canoeist who competed at the international level from 1998 to 2005.

He won a bronze medal in the K1 team event at the 2005 ICF Canoe Slalom World Championships in Penrith and a gold medal in the same event at the 2005 European Championships in Tacen.

== World Cup individual podiums ==
Season	Date	Venue	Position	Event
2003	13 Jul 2003	Tacen	1st	K1
2003	3 Aug 2003	Bratislava	2nd	K1
