= Robert Behling =

German slalom canoeist

Personal information
- Born: 28 March 1991 (age 35)
Medal record
Men's canoe slalom
Representing Germany
World Championships
Silver medal – second place	2009 La Seu d'Urgell	C2 team
Silver medal – second place	2015 London	C2 team
Bronze medal – third place	2010 Tacen	C2 team
Bronze medal – third place	2017 Pau	C2
European Championships
Gold medal – first place	2015 Markkleeberg	C2
Gold medal – first place	2018 Prague	C2 team
Silver medal – second place	2018 Prague	C2
Bronze medal – third place	2012 Augsburg	C2
Bronze medal – third place	2012 Augsburg	C2 team
U23 World Championships
Gold medal – first place	2012 Wausau	C2
Bronze medal – third place	2012 Wausau	C2 team
U23 European Championships
Gold medal – first place	2010 Markkleeberg	C2 team
Silver medal – second place	2011 Banja Luka	C2 team
Bronze medal – third place	2011 Banja Luka	C2
Junior World Championships
Silver medal – second place	2008 Roudnice nad Labem	C2 team
Bronze medal – third place	2006 Solkan	C2
Junior European Championships
Gold medal – first place	2007 Kraków	C2
Silver medal – second place	2008 Solkan	C2 team

Robert Behling (born 28 March 1991) is a German slalom canoeist who has competed at the international level since 2006.

He won four medals at the ICF Canoe Slalom World Championships with two silvers (C2 team: 2009, 2015) and two bronzes (C2: 2017, C2 team: 2010). He also won five medals at the European Championships (2 golds, 1 silver and 2 bronzes).

He won the overall World Cup title in the C2 class in 2017.

His partner in the C2 boat is Thomas Becker.

== World Cup individual podiums ==
Season	Date	Venue	Position	Event
2012	24 Jun 2012	La Seu d'Urgell	3rd	C2
2015	28 Jun 2015	Kraków	2nd	C2
2016	19 Jun 2016	Pau	2nd	C2
2016	4 Sep 2016	Prague	2nd	C2
2017	24 Jun 2017	Augsburg	1st	C2
2017	1 Jul 2017	Markkleeberg	3rd	C2
2017	2 Sep 2017	Ivrea	2nd	C2
2017	9 Sep 2017	La Seu d'Urgell	1st	C2
