= Wojciech Sekuła =

Polish canoeist

Medal record

Men's canoe slalom

Representing Poland

World Championships
Bronze medal – third place	2002 Bourg St.-Maurice	C2 team
Bronze medal – third place	2003 Augsburg	C2 team

U23 European Championships
Gold medal – first place	2004 Kraków	C2 team
Gold medal – first place	2005 Kraków	C2 team
Bronze medal – third place	2005 Kraków	C2

Junior European Championships
Silver medal – second place	1999 Solkan	C2 team

Wojciech Sekuła (born 1982) is a Polish slalom canoeist who competed at the international level from 1999 to 2006 in the C2 class together with Jarosław Miczek.

Sekuła won two bronze medals in the C2 team event at the ICF Canoe Slalom World Championships (2002, 2003).
