= Nicolas Noël =

French surgeon (1746–1832)

Nicolas Nöel (27 May 1746 – 11 May 1832) was a French surgeon.

He studied medicine in Paris until 1776, when he joined George Washington in the United States’ fight for independence, performing surgery for the Continental Army. Working as surgeon of the ship on the Boston in 1778, Nöel found himself sailing alongside John Adams and John Quincy Adams. While aboard, he taught the two Bostonians, bound for a diplomatic mission at Versailles, some much-needed French skills. Nöel continued to serve the United States until 1784. Thereafter, he returned to his homeland and began working as chief surgeon at the Hôtel-Dieu in Reims (1785).

In 1786, he was elected as a member of the American Philosophical Society. The same year, he married Jeanne Françoise Angélique Caqué. He supported the French Revolution and in 1792 joined the Army of the North, occupied a seat on the Army’s Health Council (1793), and then as Inspector General he visited hospitals in Belgium, England, and Vendée in Western France. In 1795, he founded and personally funded a free medical school and a botanical garden which lasted until 1808. Finally, at the age of sixty, he received a medical doctorate in Paris (1805), and earned the title of Chevalier de la Légion d’Honneur (1831). He died a year later in Reims.
