= Alexander Lipatov =

Russian canoeist

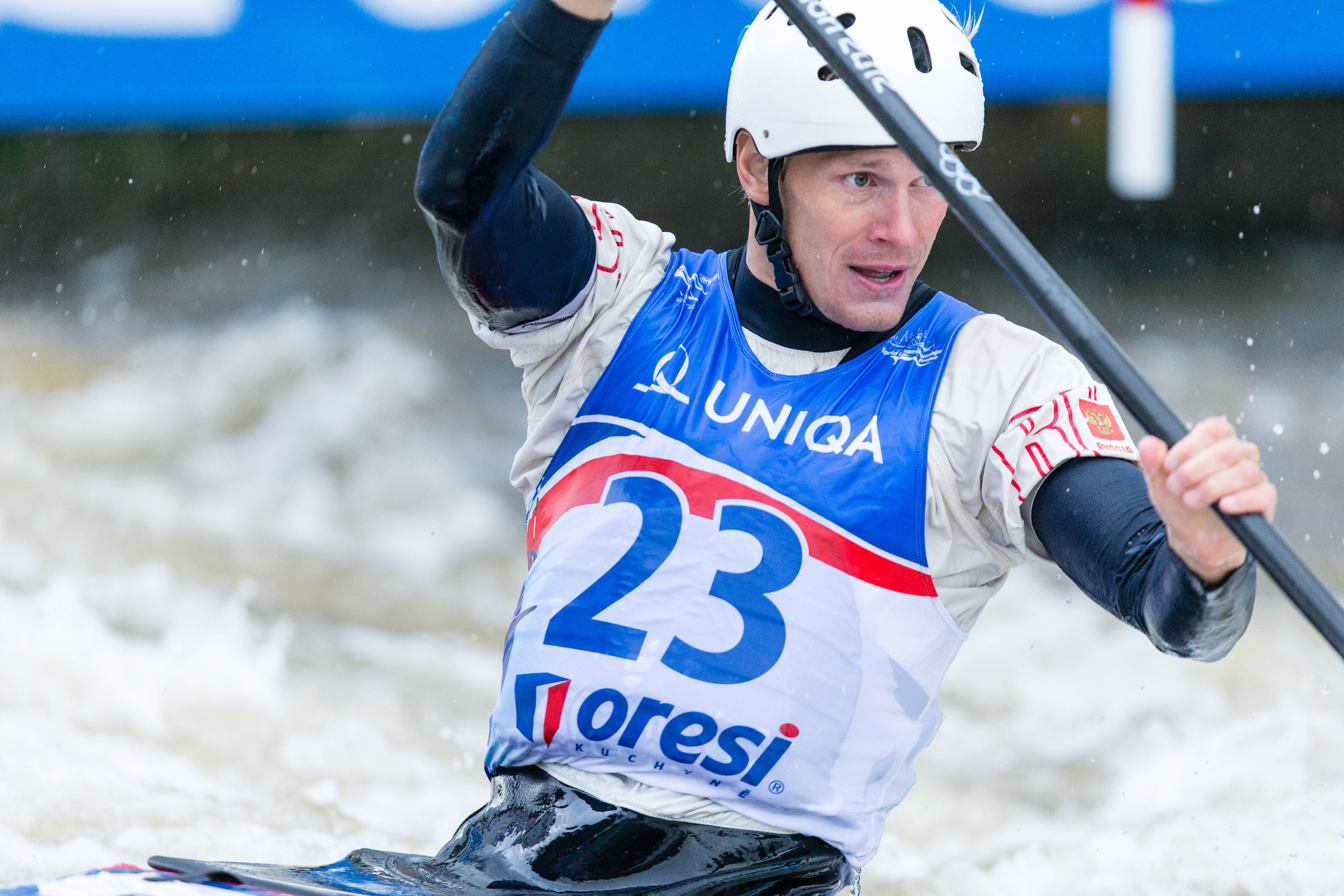
- Lipatov at the 2013 World Championships

Personal information
- Full name: Alexander Yevgenyevich Lipatov
- Born: 10 June 1981 (age 45) Leningrad, Soviet Union
- Height: 184 cm (6 ft 0 in)
- Weight: 75 kg (165 lb)

Sport
- Country: Russia
- Sport: Canoe slalom

Alexander Yevgenyevich Lipatov (Russian: Александр Евгеньевич Липатов; born 10 June 1981 in Leningrad, Soviet Union) is a Russian slalom canoeist who has competed at the international level since 1998.

At the 2008 Summer Olympics in Beijing, he was eliminated in the semifinals of the C1 event finishing 10th overall. Four years later at the 2012 Summer Olympics in London he finished 11th in the C1 event after being eliminated in the semifinals. He finished 13th in the C1 event at the 2016 Summer Olympics in Rio de Janeiro.

== World Cup individual podiums ==
Season	Date	Venue	Position	Event
2012	9 Jun 2012	Cardiff	2nd	C1
