= Adam Dudziński =

Polish footballer and bridge player

Personal information
- Full name: Adam Dudziński
- Date of birth: 30 May 1935
- Place of birth: Ostrołęka, Poland
- Date of death: 26 July 2000 (aged 65)
- Place of death: Gdańsk, Poland
- Height: 1.75 m (5 ft 9 in)
- Position: Forward

Senior career*
Years	Team	Apps	(Gls)
1951–1954	Lechia Gdańsk	1	(0)
1956	Zawisza Bydgoszcz		
1957	Brda Bydgoszcz		
1957	Stoczniowiec Gdańsk		
- * Club domestic league appearances and goals

Adam Dudziński (30 May 1935 – 26 July 2000) was a former professional footballer and a bridge player.

== Football ==
Dudziński began his playing career with Lechia Gdańsk. He made his Lechia debut on 30 May 1953 in a league match against Wisła Kraków in the I liga (Poland's highest division at the time), playing the full 90 minutes. Dudziński made a further two appearances for Lechia, both coming in the Polish Cup, before injury left him unable to play for two years.

After recovering from his injury, Dudziński was called up for his mandatory military service, during which time he played for Zawisza Bydgoszcz, Zawisza being a military funded sports club during this period. After his mandatory service had finished, he had short spells playing with Brda Bydgoszcz and Stoczniowiec Gdańsk. He was never able to reach the heights of football he experienced on his professional debut, and retired from football aged 23, most likely as a result of the serious injury he sustained at Lechia.

== Bridge ==
After football it is known that Dudziński began to play bridge at a competitive level. He represented his nation on at least one occasion, finishing 3rd in the European Championships. In the Polish Team National Championships, Dudziński and the team he played with finished in the top three on five occasions, the highlight being a second-place finish in 1973. In the Patton version of Bridge, Dudziński and his team won the national championships in 1996. The final tournament he entered was the 10th European Open Pairs, which was being held in Warsaw, Poland. He and his partner, Mieczysław Goczewski, finished the seniors category in 36th. At some point during his playing career, the PZBS (The Polish Bridge Union) awarded him with the title of "International Grandmaster".

=== Results ===
European Team Open Championship

- Poland
  - Third place: 1973

Polish National Championships (Team):

- Ster Gdańsk
  - Third place: 1968
- Neptun Gdańsk
  - Runners-up: 1973
  - Third place: 1974, 1975
- Spółnia Gdańsk
  - Third place: 1983–84

Polish National Championships (Team - Patton):

- Winners: 1996

Polish National Championships (Pairs):

- Senior category
  - Runners-up: 1991 (with Janusz Nowak), 1993 (with Henryk Bobrowski)
