= Nico Bettge =

German slalom canoeist (born 1980)

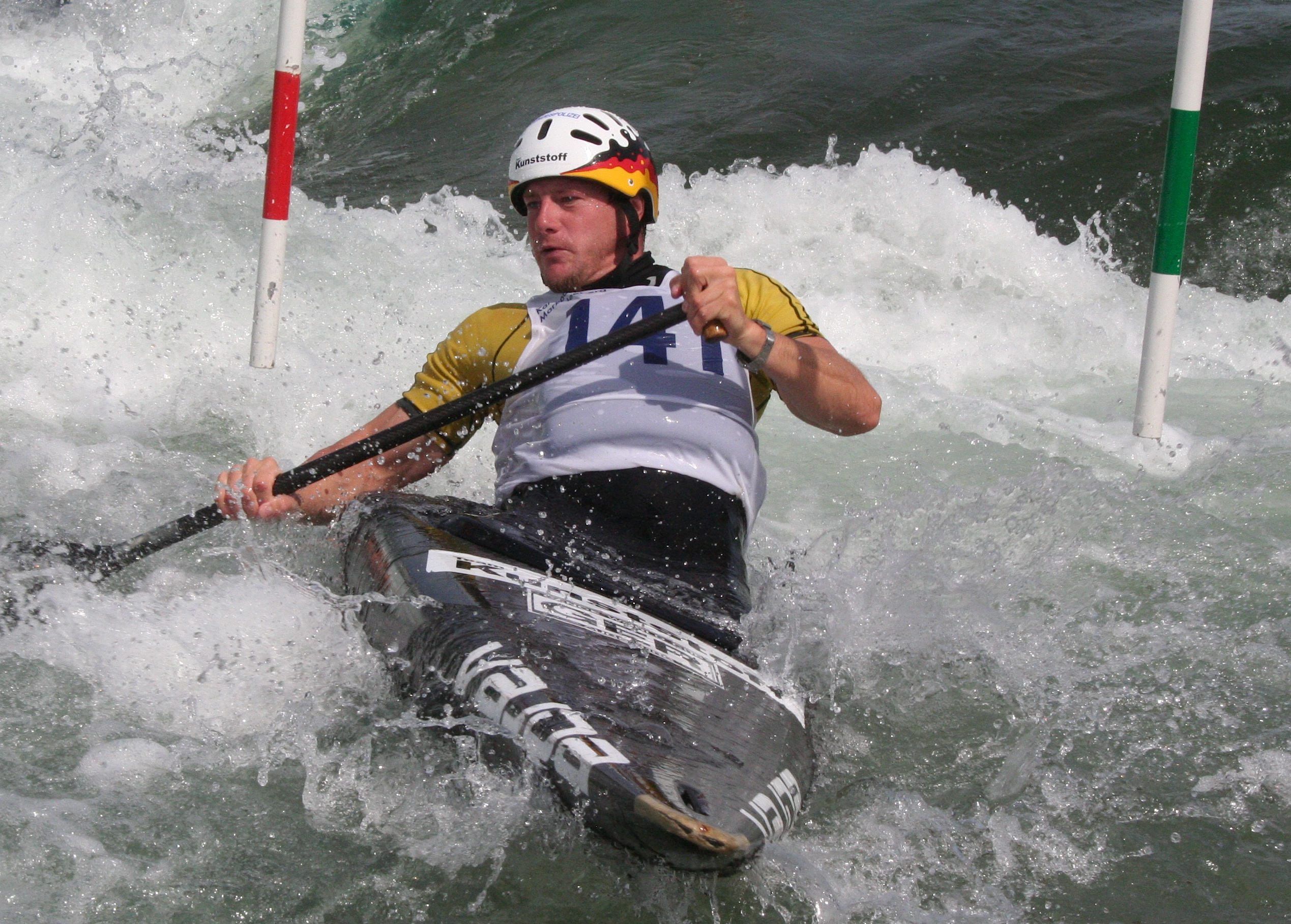

Medal record

Men's canoe slalom

Representing Germany

World Championships
| Gold medal – first place | 2006 Prague | C1 team |
| Silver medal – second place | 1999 La Seu d'Urgell | C1 team |
| Silver medal – second place | 2005 Penrith | C1 team |
| Silver medal – second place | 2007 Foz do Iguaçu | C1 team |
| Silver medal – second place | 2011 Bratislava | C1 |
| Silver medal – second place | 2011 Bratislava | C1 team |
| Silver medal – second place | 2015 London | C1 team |

European Championships
| Gold medal – first place | 2006 L'Argentière-la-Bessée | C1 team |
| Gold medal – first place | 2017 Tacen | C1 team |
| Gold medal – first place | 2018 Prague | C2 team |
| Silver medal – second place | 1998 Roudnice nad Labem | C1 team |
| Silver medal – second place | 2005 Tacen | C1 team |
| Silver medal – second place | 2007 Liptovský Mikuláš | C1 team |
| Silver medal – second place | 2011 La Seu d'Urgell | C1 team |
| Silver medal – second place | 2012 Augsburg | C1 team |
| Bronze medal – third place | 2004 Skopje | C1 |
| Bronze medal – third place | 2008 Kraków | C1 team |
| Bronze medal – third place | 2009 Nottingham | C1 team |
| Bronze medal – third place | 2016 Liptovský Mikuláš | C2 |
| Bronze medal – third place | 2016 Liptovský Mikuláš | C2 team |

Junior World Championships
| Gold medal – first place | 1998 Lofer | C1 team |

Nico Bettge (born 15 May 1980) is a German slalom canoeist who has competed in C1 since the 1997. Since 2014 he has also competed in C2 together with David Schröder.

Bettge won seven medals at the ICF Canoe Slalom World Championships with a gold (C1 team: 2006) and six silvers (C1: 2011; C1 team: 1999, 2005, 2007, 2011, 2015).

He is the overall World Cup champion in the C1 class from 2007. He also won 13 medals at the European Championships (3 golds, 5 silvers and 5 bronzes).

== World Cup individual podiums ==
| | 1st place, gold medalist(s) | 2nd place, silver medalist(s) | 3rd place, bronze medalist(s) | Total |
| C1 | 5 | 2 | 2 | 9 |
| C2 | 0 | 2 | 1 | 3 |
| Total | 5 | 4 | 3 | 12 |

| Season | Date | Venue | Position | Event |
|---|---|---|---|---|
| 2000 | 30 July 2000 | Augsburg | 3rd | C1 |
| 2002 | 21 July 2002 | Augsburg | 1st | C1 |
| 2004 | 18 July 2004 | Augsburg | 2nd | C1 |
| 2006 | 11 June 2006 | La Seu d'Urgell | 1st | C1 |
| 2007 | 18 March 2007 | Foz do Iguaçu | 2nd | C1^{1} |
| 2007 | 8 July 2007 | Tacen | 3rd | C1 |
| 2007 | 15 July 2007 | Augsburg | 1st | C1 |
| 2008 | 29 June 2008 | Tacen | 1st | C1 |
| 2010 | 4 July 2010 | Augsburg | 1st | C1 |
| 2016 | 5 June 2016 | Ivrea | 2nd | C2 |
| 2016 | 12 June 2016 | La Seu d'Urgell | 3rd | C2 |
| 2017 | 9 September 2017 | La Seu d'Urgell | 2nd | C2 |

^{1} Pan American Championship counting for World Cup points
