= Marcin Pochwała =

Polish slalom canoeist

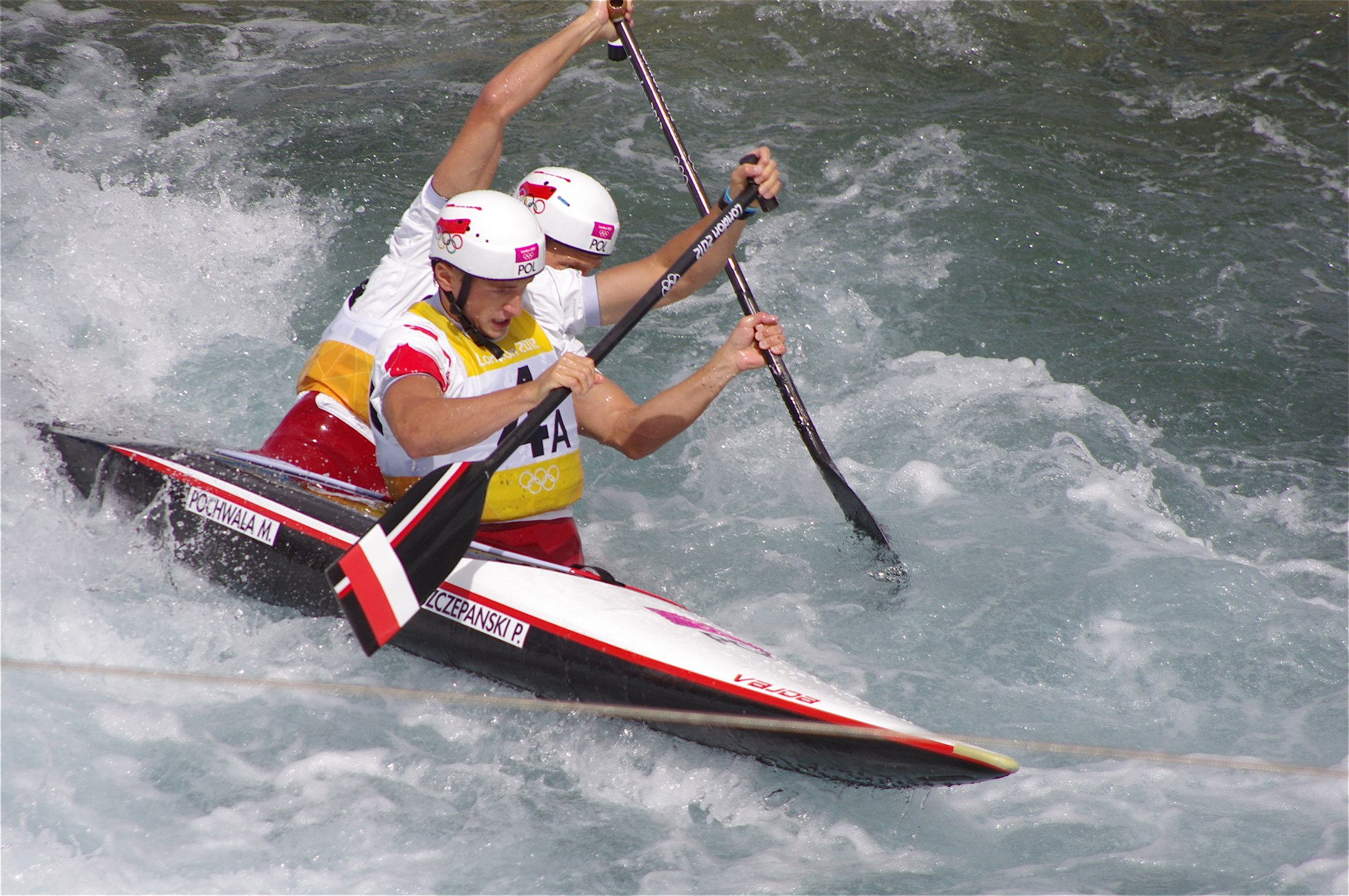
- Pochwała and Szczepański in 2012

Personal information
- Full name: Marcin Krzysztof Pochwała
- Nationality: Polish
- Born: 14 February 1984 (age 42) Nowy Sącz, Poland
- Height: 1.82 m (6 ft 0 in)
- Weight: 80 kg (176 lb)

Sport
- Country: Poland
- Sport: Canoe slalom
- Event: C2, Mixed C2
- Club: KKK Krakow
Medal record
Men's canoe slalom
Representing Poland
World Championships
Gold medal – first place	2018 Rio de Janeiro	Mixed C2
Silver medal – second place	2019 La Seu d'Urgell	Mixed C2
Bronze medal – third place	2003 Augsburg	C2 team
European Championships
Silver medal – second place	2008 Kraków	C2 team
Silver medal – second place	2010 Bratislava	C2 team
Silver medal – second place	2013 Kraków	C2
Silver medal – second place	2013 Kraków	C2 team
Silver medal – second place	2014 Vienna	C2
Silver medal – second place	2016 Liptovský Mikuláš	C2 team
Silver medal – second place	2017 Tacen	C2 team
Bronze medal – third place	2007 Liptovský Mikuláš	C2 team
Bronze medal – third place	2009 Nottingham	C2 team
U23 European Championships
Gold medal – first place	2004 Kraków	C2 team
Gold medal – first place	2005 Kraków	C2 team
Gold medal – first place	2007 Kraków	C2 team
Silver medal – second place	2007 Kraków	C2
Junior World Championships
Silver medal – second place	2002 Nowy Sącz	C2
Silver medal – second place	2002 Nowy Sącz	C2 team
Junior European Championships
Silver medal – second place	2001 Bratislava	C2 team

Marcin Krzysztof Pochwała (born 14 February 1984) is a Polish slalom canoeist who has competed at the international level since 2001.

== Career ==
He won three medals at the ICF Canoe Slalom World Championships with a gold (Mixed C2: 2018), a silver (Mixed C2: 2019) and a bronze (C2 team: 2003). He also won seven silvers and two bronzes at the European Championships.

Competing in four Summer Olympics in the C2 event, he earned his best finish of fifth in 2012 in London and again in 2016 in Rio de Janeiro (both with Piotr Szczepański). He was 8th in 2008 and 10th in 2004 (both with Paweł Sarna).

He has changed C2 partners several times during his career. He's had most success competing alongside Paweł Sarna (2001–2008) and Piotr Szczepański (since 2009). He was also partnered occasionally by Jarosław Miczek (2005) and Sławomir Mordarski (2006).

His partner in the mixed C2 boat is Aleksandra Stach.

Ski jumper Tomasz Pochwała is his cousin.

== World Cup individual podiums ==
Season	Date	Venue	Position	Event
2010	19 June 2010	Prague	3rd	C2
2011	10 July 2011	Markkleeberg	3rd	C2
2012	2 September 2012	Bratislava	2nd	C2
2013	30 June 2013	Augsburg	3rd	C2
2014	22 June 2014	Prague	2nd	C2
2015	5 July 2015	Liptovský Mikuláš	3rd	C2
2018	30 June 2018	Kraków	3rd	Mixed C2
