= Étienne Daille =

French slalom canoeist

Personal information
- Full name: Étienne Daille
- Born: 19 September 1989 (age 36) Prague, Czechoslovakia
- Height: 1.77 m (5 ft 10 in)

Sport
- Country: France
- Sport: Canoe slalom
- Event: K1

Achievements and titles
- Highest world ranking: No. 1 (2012-13)
Medal record
World Championships
Bronze medal – third place	2013 Prague	K1 team
European Championships
Gold medal – first place	2012 Augsburg	K1 team
Silver medal – second place	2016 Liptovský Mikuláš	K1 team
U23 European Championships
Gold medal – first place	2010 Markkleeberg	K1 team
Gold medal – first place	2012 Solkan	K1 team
Junior European Championships
Gold medal – first place	2007 Kraków	K1 team
Bronze medal – third place	2007 Kraków	K1

Étienne Daille (born 19 September 1989 in Prague, Czechoslovakia) is a French slalom canoeist who has competed at the international level since 2007.

Daille won the overall World Cup title in the K1 class in 2012 by 75 points after finishing on the podium at every round. He won a bronze medal in the K1 team event at the 2013 ICF Canoe Slalom World Championships in Prague. He also won two medals (1 gold and 1 silver) in the K1 team event at the European Championships. Daille finished as the World No. 1 in the K1 event in 2012 and 2013.

At the 2012 Summer Olympics he competed in the K1 event, finishing 13th in the heats and qualifying for the semifinals. He qualified for the final with the 10th fastest time. In the final he ranked 7th, with a gap of +8.44 behind the winner.

Son of a French father and Czech mother, both athletes, Daille grew up in Pays du Bugey.

== World Cup individual podiums ==
Season	Date	Venue	Position	Event
2012	9 Jun 2012	Cardiff	2nd	K1
2012	16 Jun 2012	Pau	1st	K1
2012	23 Jun 2012	La Seu d'Urgell	1st	K1
2012	25 Aug 2012	Prague	1st	K1
2012	1 Sep 2012	Bratislava	3rd	K1
