= Fiona Pennie =

British slalom canoeist

Fiona Pennie-Douglas
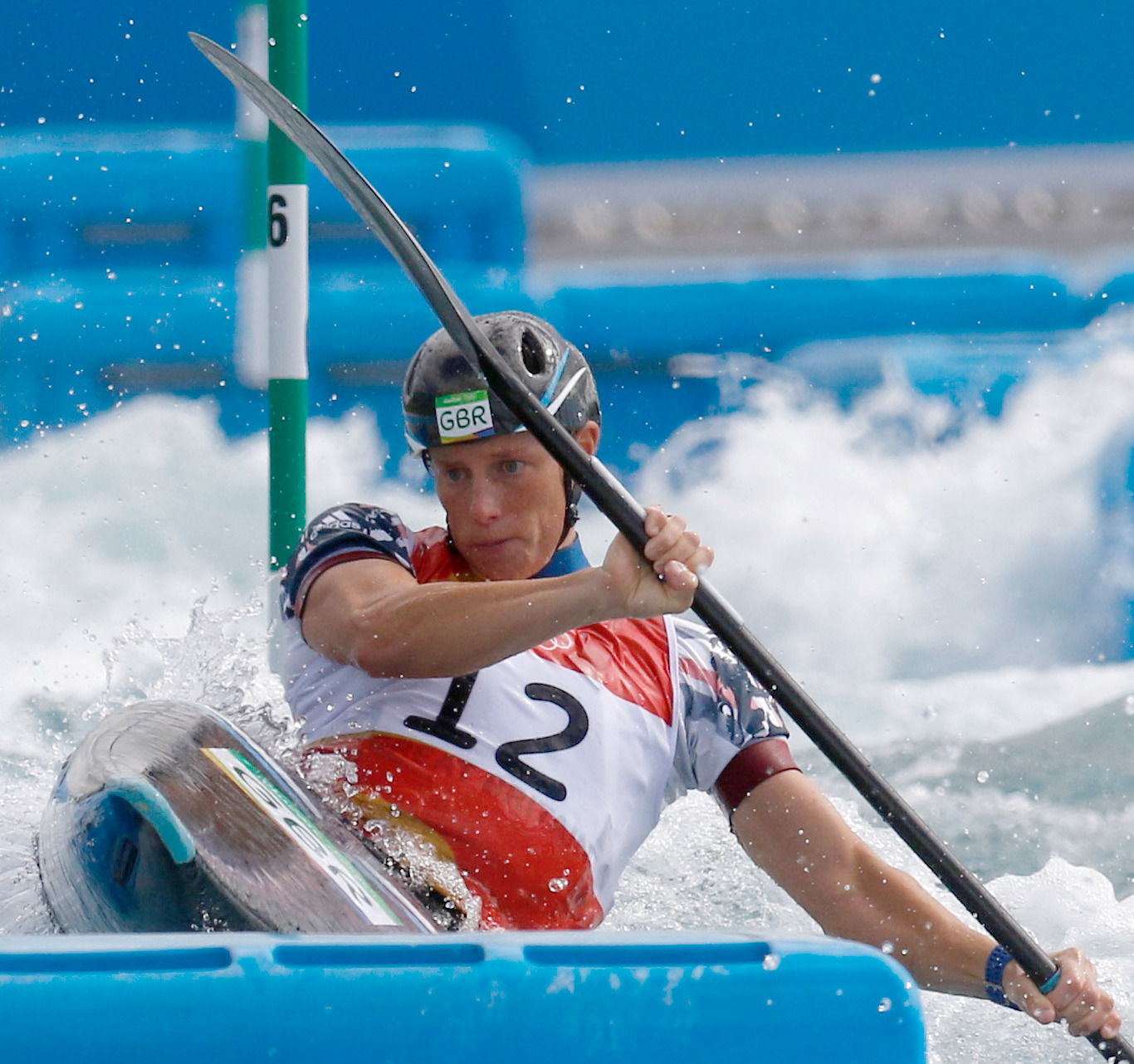
- Pennie at the 2016 Olympics

Personal information
- Full name: Fiona Elizabeth Maureen Pennie-Douglas
- Nationality: British
- Born: 9 November 1982 (age 43) Alexandria, West Dunbartonshire, Scotland
- Height: 1.69 m (5 ft 7 in)
- Weight: 72 kg (159 lb)
- Spouse: Lynsey Pennie-Douglas

Sport
- Country: Great Britain
- Sport: Canoe slalom
- Event: K1, extreme slalom
- Club: C.R. CATS

Achievements and titles
- Highest world ranking: No. 5 (July 2011)
Medal record
Representing Great Britain
Event	1st	2nd	3rd
Olympic Games	0	0	0
World Championships	2	3	2
European Championships	3	1	4
U23 European Championships	0	0	2
Junior World Championships	0	0	2
Total	5	4	10
World Championships
Gold medal – first place	2019 La Seu d'Urgell	K1 team
Gold medal – first place	2021 Bratislava	K1 team
Silver medal – second place	2006 Prague	K1
Silver medal – second place	2014 Deep Creek Lake	K1
Silver medal – second place	2015 London	K1 team
Bronze medal – third place	2007 Foz do Iguaçu	K1 team
Bronze medal – third place	2018 Rio de Janeiro	K1 team
European Championships
Gold medal – first place	2013 Kraków	K1
Gold medal – first place	2016 Liptovský Mikuláš	K1 team
Gold medal – first place	2021 Ivrea	K1 team
Silver medal – second place	2013 Kraków	K1 team
Bronze medal – third place	2007 Liptovský Mikuláš	K1 team
Bronze medal – third place	2008 Kraków	K1 team
Bronze medal – third place	2012 Augsburg	K1
Bronze medal – third place	2018 Prague	K1
U23 European Championships
Bronze medal – third place	2004 Kraków	K1 team
Bronze medal – third place	2005 Kraków	K1
Junior World Championships
Bronze medal – third place	2000 Bratislava	K1
Bronze medal – third place	2000 Bratislava	K1 team

Fiona Pennie-Douglas (née Pennie; born 9 November 1982) is a former British slalom canoeist who competed internationally from 1997 until 2021. She lives in Hemingford Grey in Cambridgeshire.

== Career ==
Pennie won a bronze medal at the Junior World Championships in 2000 and won the overall Junior World Cup Series in the same year. As an Under 23 athlete, she won a team bronze medal in 2004 and an individual bronze medal in 2005, both at the European Under 23 Championships. She competed in the K1 event at the 2008 and 2016 Olympics and placed 17th and 6th, respectively.

She won seven medals at the ICF Canoe Slalom World Championships with two golds (K1 team: 2019, 2021), three silvers (K1: 2006, 2014; K1 team: 2015) and two bronzes (K1 team: 2007, 2018). She became European Champion in the K1 (solo kayak class) event in 2013. She won a total of 8 medals (3 golds, 1 silver and 4 bronzes) at the European Championships.

== World Cup individual podiums ==
Season	Date	Venue	Position	Event
2006	6 August 2006	Prague	2nd	K1^{1}
2007	30 June 2007	Prague	3rd	K1
2010	20 June 2010	Prague	2nd	K1
2010	27 June 2010	La Seu d'Urgell	3rd	K1
2016	11 September 2016	Tacen	3rd	K1
2021	13 June 2021	Prague	2nd	Extreme K1

^{1} World Championship counting for World Cup points
