= Jure Meglič =

Slovenian slalom canoeist (born 1984)

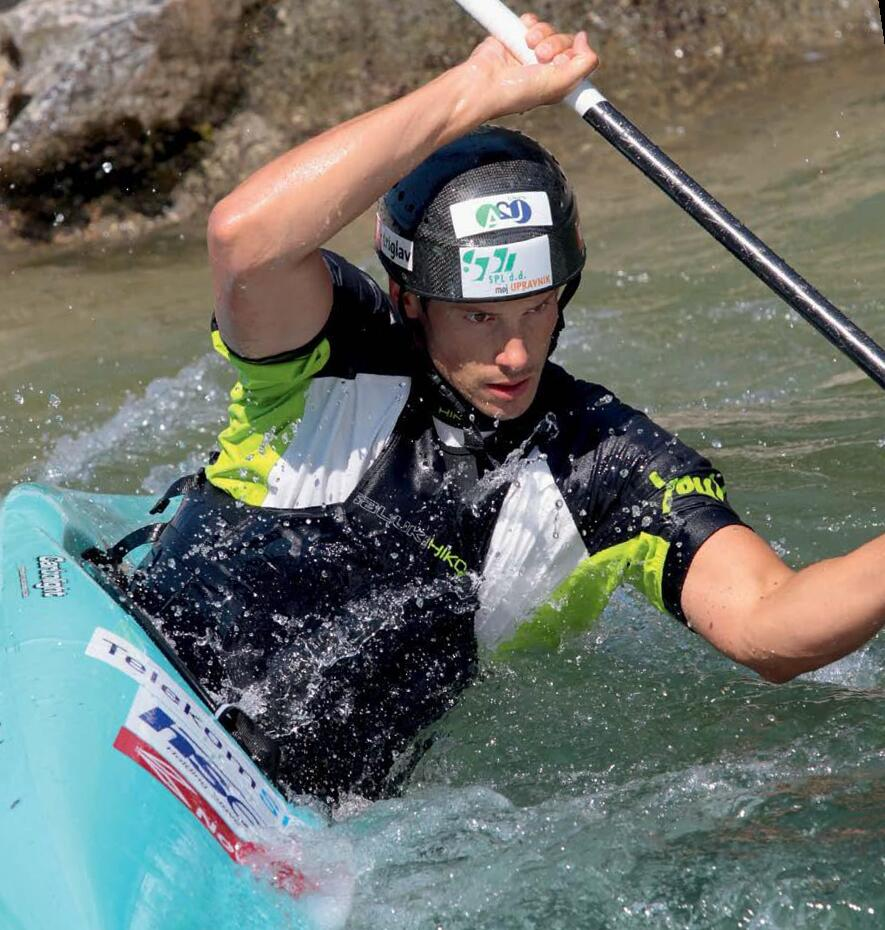
- Meglič in 2013

Personal information
- Born: 18 October 1984 (age 41) Kranj, Yugoslavia
- Height: 182 cm (6 ft 0 in)
- Weight: 80 kg (176 lb)

Sport
- Country: Slovenia / Azerbaijan
- Sport: Canoe slalom
- Coached by: Jean Jerome Perrine
Medal record
Men's canoe slalom
Representing Slovenia
World Championships
Bronze medal – third place	2010 Tacen	K1
European Championships
Gold medal – first place	2006 L'Argentière-la-Bessée	K1 team
Gold medal – first place	2007 Liptovský Mikuláš	K1 team
Gold medal – first place	2011 La Seu d'Urgell	K1 team
Silver medal – second place	2010 Bratislava	K1
Bronze medal – third place	2010 Bratislava	K1 team
U23 European Championships
Silver medal – second place	2004 Kraków	K1 team

Jure Meglič (Azerbaijani: Yure Meqliç, born 18 October 1984 in Kranj) is a Slovenian slalom canoeist who started competing at the international level in 2001. He represented Azerbaijan from 2014 until his retirement in 2016.

He won a bronze medal in the K1 event at the 2010 ICF Canoe Slalom World Championships in Tacen. He also won five medals at the European Championships (3 golds, 1 silver and 1 bronze).

Meglič finished 14th in the K1 event at the 2016 Summer Olympics in Rio de Janeiro.

== World Cup individual podiums ==
Season	Date	Venue	Position	Event
2007	8 Jul 2007	Tacen	1st	K1
2011	25 Jun 2011	Tacen	2nd	K1
2012	1 Sep 2012	Bratislava	1st	K1
