= Bartłomiej Kruczek =

Polish canoeist

Medal record

Men's canoe slalom

Representing Poland

World Championships
Bronze medal – third place	2002 Bourg-Saint-Maurice	C2 team

U23 European Championships
Gold medal – first place	2004 Kraków	C2 team
Gold medal – first place	2005 Kraków	C2 team

Bartłomiej Kruczek is a Polish slalom canoeist who competed at the international level from 2002 to 2006.

He won a bronze medal in the C2 team event at the 2002 ICF Canoe Slalom World Championships in Bourg-Saint-Maurice.
