= Urša Kragelj =

Slovenian slalom canoeist

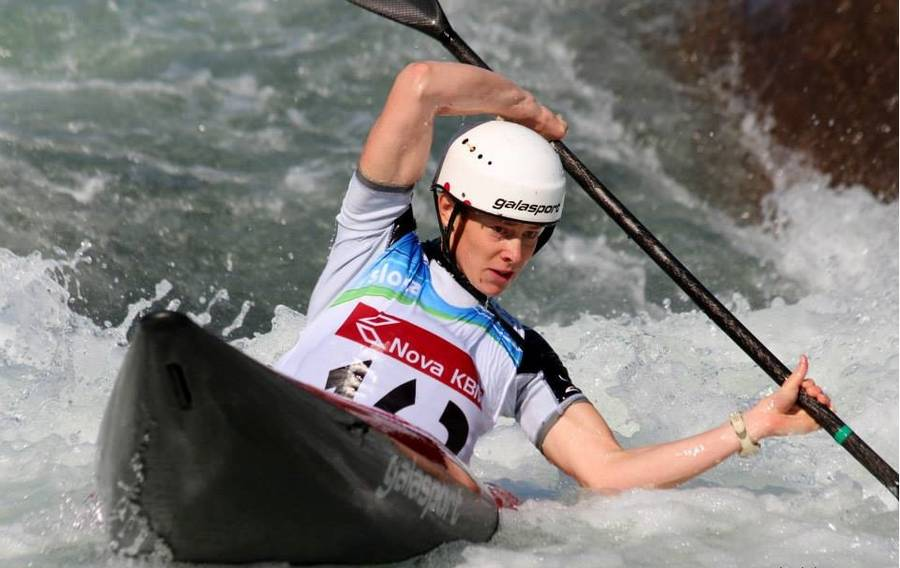

Personal information
- Nationality: Slovenian
- Born: 2 July 1988 (age 37) Šempeter pri Gorici

Sport
- Country: Slovenia
- Sport: Canoe slalom
- Event: K1
Medal record
Women's canoe slalom
Representing Slovenia
World Championships
Bronze medal – third place	2010 Tacen	K1 team
Bronze medal – third place	2013 Prague	K1 team
European Championships
Gold medal – first place	2017 Tacen	K1 team
Silver medal – second place	2016 Liptovský Mikuláš	K1
Bronze medal – third place	2010 Bratislava	K1
U23 European Championships
Gold medal – first place	2010 Markkleeberg	K1 team
Silver medal – second place	2008 Solkan	K1
Bronze medal – third place	2007 Kraków	K1 team
Junior World Championships
Gold medal – first place	2006 Solkan	K1
Junior European Championships
Bronze medal – third place	2006 Nottingham	K1

Urša Kragelj (born 2 July 1988 in Šempeter pri Gorici) is a Slovenian slalom canoeist who has competed at the international level since 2003.

She won two bronze medals in the K1 team event at the ICF Canoe Slalom World Championships, earning them in 2010 and 2013. She also won a gold, a silver and a bronze medal at the European Championships.

Kragelj won the overall World Cup title in the K1 class in 2012.

She finished in 9th place in the K1 event at the 2016 Summer Olympics in Rio de Janeiro.

== World Cup individual podiums ==
Season	Date	Venue	Position	Event
2011	26 June 2011	Tacen	3rd	K1
2012	24 June 2012	La Seu d'Urgell	1st	K1
2012	2 September 2012	Bratislava	3rd	K1
2017	25 June 2017	Augsburg	3rd	K1
2021	11 September 2021	Pau	3rd	K1
