= Piotr Szczepański =

Polish slalom canoeist

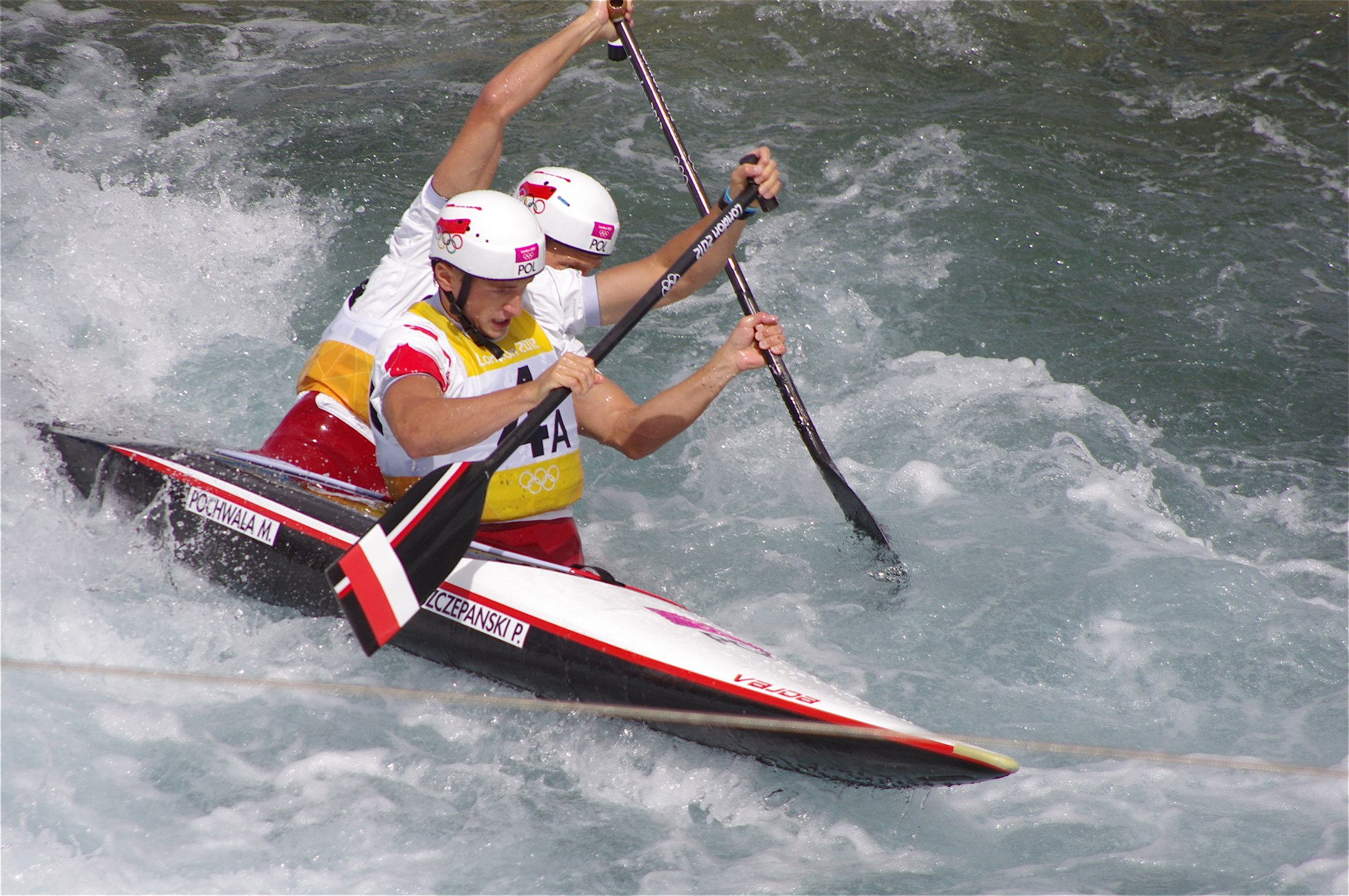
- Szczepański (front) with Marcin Pochwała at the 2012 Summer Olympics

Personal information
- Born: 31 July 1988 (age 38) Nowe Miasto nad Pilicą, Poland
- Height: 180 cm (5 ft 11 in)
- Weight: 76 kg (168 lb)
Medal record
Men's canoe slalom
Representing Poland
European Championships
Silver medal – second place	2010 Bratislava	C2 team
Silver medal – second place	2013 Kraków	C2
Silver medal – second place	2013 Kraków	C2 team
Silver medal – second place	2014 Vienna	C2
Silver medal – second place	2016 Liptovský Mikuláš	C2 team
Silver medal – second place	2017 Tacen	C2 team
Bronze medal – third place	2009 Nottingham	C2 team
U23 European Championships
Gold medal – first place	2008 Solkan	C1 team
Junior World Championships
Silver medal – second place	2006 Solkan	C1 team
Junior European Championships
Gold medal – first place	2006 Nottingham	C1 team
Silver medal – second place	2005 Kraków	C2 team

Piotr Szczepański (born 31 July 1988 in Nowe Miasto nad Pilicą) is a Polish slalom canoeist who has competed at the international level since 2004. He has competed in C1 and C2. His partner in the C2 boat since 2009 has been Marcin Pochwała.

He won seven medals at the European Championships with six silvers and one bronze.

At the 2012 Summer Olympics in London he competed in the C2 event together with Marcin Pochwała where they finished in 5th place in the final. They also finished 5th at the 2016 Summer Olympics in Rio de Janeiro.

== World Cup individual podiums ==
Season	Date	Venue	Position	Event
2010	19 June 2010	Prague	3rd	C2
2011	10 July 2011	Markkleeberg	3rd	C2
2012	2 September 2012	Bratislava	2nd	C2
2013	30 June 2013	Augsburg	3rd	C2
2014	22 June 2014	Prague	2nd	C2
2015	5 July 2015	Liptovský Mikuláš	3rd	C2
