= List of European Canoe Slalom Championships medalists =

This is a list of medalists from the European Canoe Slalom Championships.

== Men's canoe ==
=== C1 ===
Debuted: 1996.

Championships	Gold	Silver	Bronze
1996 Augsburg	Simon Hočevar (SLO)	Sören Kaufmann (GER)	Martin Lang (GER)
1998 Roudnice nad Labem	David Jančar (CZE)	Michal Martikán (SVK)	Lukáš Pollert (CZE)
2000 Mezzana	Tony Estanguet (FRA)	Juraj Minčík (SVK)	Lukáš Pollert (CZE)
2002 Bratislava	Mariusz Wieczorek (POL)	Tony Estanguet (FRA)	Jan Benzien (GER)
2004 Skopje	Tomáš Indruch (CZE)	Krzysztof Bieryt (POL)	Nico Bettge (GER)
2005 Tacen	Stefan Pfannmöller (GER)	Alexander Slafkovský (SVK)	Stuart McIntosh (GBR)
2006 L'Argentière-la-Bessée	Tony Estanguet (FRA)	Michal Martikán (SVK)	Tomáš Indruch (CZE)
2007 Liptovský Mikuláš	Michal Martikán (SVK)	Pierre Labarelle (FRA)	Christos Tsakmakis (GRE)
2008 Kraków	Michal Martikán (SVK)	Stanislav Ježek (CZE)	Alexander Slafkovský (SVK)
2009 Nottingham	Michal Martikán (SVK)	Alexander Slafkovský (SVK)	Jan Benzien (GER)
2010 Bratislava	Michal Martikán (SVK)	Matej Beňuš (SVK)	Alexander Slafkovský (SVK)
2011 La Seu d'Urgell	Tony Estanguet (FRA)	Alexander Slafkovský (SVK)	Denis Gargaud Chanut (FRA)
2012 Augsburg	Sideris Tasiadis (GER)	Tony Estanguet (FRA)	Benjamin Savšek (SLO)
2013 Kraków	Jan Benzien (GER)	Sideris Tasiadis (GER)	Matej Beňuš (SVK)
2014 Vienna	Alexander Slafkovský (SVK)	Michal Martikán (SVK)	Jan Benzien (GER)
2015 Markkleeberg	Benjamin Savšek (SLO)	Sideris Tasiadis (GER)	Matej Beňuš (SVK)
2016 Liptovský Mikuláš	Alexander Slafkovský (SVK)	Michal Martikán (SVK)	Ander Elosegi (ESP)
2017 Tacen	Alexander Slafkovský (SVK)	Thomas Koechlin (SUI)	Michal Martikán (SVK)
2018 Prague	Ryan Westley (GBR)	Adam Burgess (GBR)	Tomáš Rak (CZE)
2019 Pau	Benjamin Savšek (SLO)	Martin Thomas (FRA)	Sideris Tasiadis (GER)
2020 Prague	Benjamin Savšek (SLO)	Lukáš Rohan (CZE)	Václav Chaloupka (CZE)
2021 Ivrea	Denis Gargaud Chanut (FRA)	Matej Beňuš (SVK)	Sideris Tasiadis (GER)
2022 Liptovský Mikuláš	Benjamin Savšek (SLO)	Sideris Tasiadis (GER)	Miquel Travé (ESP)
2023 Kraków	Ryan Westley (GBR)	Miquel Travé (ESP)	Václav Chaloupka (CZE)
2024 Tacen	Žiga Lin Hočevar (SLO)	Luka Božič (SLO)	Benjamin Savšek (SLO)
2025 Vaires-sur-Marne	Miquel Travé (ESP)	Nicolas Gestin (FRA)	Žiga Lin Hočevar (SLO)
2026 Ivrea	Yohann Senechault (FRA)	Lukáš Kratochvíl (CZE)	Elio Maiutto (ITA)

=== C1 team ===
Debuted: 1996.

Championships	Gold	Silver	Bronze
1996 Augsburg	Germany; Sören Kaufmann; Martin Lang; Vitus Husek	Czech Republic; Pavel Janda; David Jančar; Lukáš Pollert	Slovenia; Dejan Stevanovič; Simon Hočevar; Sebastjan Linke
1998 Roudnice nad Labem	Slovakia; Michal Martikán; Juraj Ontko; Juraj Minčík	Germany; Stefan Pfannmöller; Nico Bettge; Martin Lang	Great Britain; Stuart McIntosh; Mark Delaney; Robert Turner
2000 Mezzana	Slovakia; Michal Martikán; Dušan Ovčarík; Juraj Minčík	Czech Republic; Přemysl Vlk; Lukáš Pollert; Tomáš Indruch	Spain; Jordi Sangrá Gibert; Jon Ergüín; Jordi Domenjó
2002 Bratislava	Slovakia; Michal Martikán; Juraj Minčík; Alexander Slafkovský	Germany; Stefan Pfannmöller; Jan Benzien; Sören Kaufmann	Poland; Mariusz Wieczorek; Krzysztof Bieryt; Grzegorz Wójs
2004 Skopje	Czech Republic; Tomáš Indruch; Jan Mašek; Ondřej Pinkava	Slovakia; Alexander Slafkovský; Dušan Ovčarík; Juraj Minčík	Slovenia; Simon Hočevar; Dejan Stevanovič; Jošt Zakrajšek
2005 Tacen	Slovakia; Juraj Minčík; Michal Martikán; Alexander Slafkovský	Germany; Nico Bettge; Jan Benzien; Stefan Pfannmöller	Czech Republic; Jan Mašek; Stanislav Ježek; Tomáš Indruch
2006 L'Argentière-la-Bessée	Germany; Stefan Pfannmöller; Nico Bettge; Jan Benzien	Slovakia; Michal Martikán; Juraj Minčík; Alexander Slafkovský	Czech Republic; Tomáš Indruch; Jan Mašek; Stanislav Ježek
2007 Liptovský Mikuláš	Slovakia; Michal Martikán; Juraj Minčík; Matej Beňuš	Germany; Stefan Pfannmöller; Nico Bettge; Jan Benzien	France; Tony Estanguet; Pierre Labarelle; Nicolas Peschier
2008 Kraków	Slovakia; Michal Martikán; Alexander Slafkovský; Matej Beňuš	Poland; Krzysztof Bieryt; Grzegorz Kiljanek; Dawid Bartos	Germany; Christian Bahmann; Nico Bettge; Lukas Hoffmann
2009 Nottingham	Czech Republic; Stanislav Ježek; Tomáš Indruch; Jan Mašek	France; Tony Estanguet; Denis Gargaud Chanut; Nicolas Peschier	Germany; Sideris Tasiadis; Jan Benzien; Nico Bettge
2010 Bratislava	Slovakia; Michal Martikán; Alexander Slafkovský; Matej Beňuš	Czech Republic; Jan Mašek; Michal Jáně; Stanislav Ježek	France; Tony Estanguet; Denis Gargaud Chanut; Nicolas Peschier
2011 La Seu d'Urgell	France; Tony Estanguet; Denis Gargaud Chanut; Nicolas Peschier	Germany; Nico Bettge; Jan Benzien; Sideris Tasiadis	Czech Republic; Stanislav Ježek; Vítězslav Gebas; Tomáš Indruch
2012 Augsburg	Slovakia; Michal Martikán; Matej Beňuš; Alexander Slafkovský	Germany; Nico Bettge; Jan Benzien; Sideris Tasiadis	France; Tony Estanguet; Denis Gargaud Chanut; Thibaut Vielliard
2013 Kraków	Slovakia; Alexander Slafkovský; Matej Beňuš; Jerguš Baďura	Germany; Franz Anton; Jan Benzien; Sideris Tasiadis	Slovenia; Benjamin Savšek; Anže Berčič; Luka Božič
2014 Vienna	Slovenia; Benjamin Savšek; Anže Berčič; Luka Božič	Czech Republic; Lukáš Rohan; Vítězslav Gebas; Jan Mašek	Slovakia; Michal Martikán; Alexander Slafkovský; Karol Rozmuš
2015 Markkleeberg	Slovakia; Michal Martikán; Alexander Slafkovský; Matej Beňuš	Czech Republic; Michal Jáně; Stanislav Ježek; Tomáš Rak	Great Britain; David Florence; Ryan Westley; Adam Burgess
2016 Liptovský Mikuláš	Slovakia; Michal Martikán; Alexander Slafkovský; Matej Beňuš	Poland; Grzegorz Hedwig; Przemysław Plewa; Igor Sztuba	Great Britain; David Florence; Ryan Westley; Adam Burgess
2017 Tacen	Germany; Sideris Tasiadis; Nico Bettge; Franz Anton	Slovenia; Benjamin Savšek; Luka Božič; Anže Berčič	Italy; Raffaello Ivaldi; Roberto Colazingari; Stefano Cipressi
2018 Prague	France; Denis Gargaud Chanut; Pierre-Antoine Tillard; Cédric Joly	Slovakia; Alexander Slafkovský; Michal Martikán; Marko Mirgorodský	Czech Republic; Vítězslav Gebas; Lukáš Rohan; Tomáš Rak
2019 Pau	Slovenia; Benjamin Savšek; Luka Božič; Anže Berčič	France; Denis Gargaud Chanut; Martin Thomas; Cédric Joly	Russia; Dmitrii Khramtsov; Kirill Setkin; Pavel Kotov
2020 Prague	Slovenia; Benjamin Savšek; Luka Božič; Jure Lenarčič	Ireland; Liam Jegou; Robert Hendrick; Jake Cochrane	Poland; Grzegorz Hedwig; Kacper Sztuba; Szymon Zawadzki
2021 Ivrea	Slovakia; Alexander Slafkovský; Michal Martikán; Matej Beňuš	Italy; Roberto Colazingari; Raffaello Ivaldi; Flavio Micozzi	Slovenia; Benjamin Savšek; Luka Božič; Nejc Polenčič
2022 Liptovský Mikuláš	Germany; Sideris Tasiadis; Franz Anton; Timo Trummer	Poland; Grzegorz Hedwig; Kacper Sztuba; Michał Wiercioch	Spain; Luis Fernández; Miquel Travé; Ander Elosegi
2023 Kraków	Germany; Sideris Tasiadis; Franz Anton; Timo Trummer	Slovakia; Matej Beňuš; Marko Mirgorodský; Alexander Slafkovský	Great Britain; Ryan Westley; Adam Burgess; James Kettle
2024 Tacen	Slovenia; Benjamin Savšek; Luka Božič; Žiga Lin Hočevar	Czech Republic; Jiří Prskavec; Lukáš Rohan; Václav Chaloupka	Slovakia; Matej Beňuš; Michal Martikán; Marko Mirgorodský
2025 Vaires-sur-Marne	Great Britain; Adam Burgess; Ryan Westley; Luc Royle	Slovenia; Luka Božič; Žiga Lin Hočevar; Benjamin Savšek	Slovakia; Matej Beňuš; Marko Mirgorodský; Michal Martikán
2026 Ivrea	France; Nicolas Gestin; Yohann Senechault; Jules Bernardet	Czech Republic; Václav Chaloupka; Lukáš Kratochvíl; Lukáš Rohan	Italy; Raffaello Ivaldi; Flavio Micozzi; Elio Maiutto

=== C2 ===
Debuted: 1996. Discontinued: 2018.

Championships	Gold	Silver	Bronze
1996 Augsburg	Switzerland; Peter Matti; Ueli Matti	Czech Republic; Miroslav Šimek; Jiří Rohan	Poland; Krzysztof Kołomański; Michał Staniszewski
1998 Roudnice nad Labem	Slovakia; Pavol Hochschorner; Peter Hochschorner	Czech Republic; Jaroslav Volf; Ondřej Štěpánek	Slovakia; Milan Kubáň; Marián Olejník
2000 Mezzana	Slovakia; Pavol Hochschorner; Peter Hochschorner	France; Frank Adisson; Wilfrid Forgues	Poland; Krzysztof Kołomański; Michał Staniszewski
2002 Bratislava	Slovakia; Pavol Hochschorner; Peter Hochschorner	Czech Republic; Marek Jiras; Tomáš Máder	Czech Republic; Jaroslav Volf; Ondřej Štěpánek
2004 Skopje	Czech Republic; Jaroslav Volf; Ondřej Štěpánek	France; Martin Braud; Cédric Forgit	Slovakia; Ladislav Škantár; Peter Škantár
2005 Tacen	Czech Republic; Jaroslav Volf; Ondřej Štěpánek	Czech Republic; Marek Jiras; Tomáš Máder	Slovakia; Ladislav Škantár; Peter Škantár
2006 L'Argentière-la-Bessée	France; Martin Braud; Cédric Forgit	Slovakia; Pavol Hochschorner; Peter Hochschorner	Germany; Kay Simon; Robby Simon
2007 Liptovský Mikuláš	Slovakia; Ladislav Škantár; Peter Škantár	Czech Republic; Jaroslav Volf; Ondřej Štěpánek	Slovakia; Pavol Hochschorner; Peter Hochschorner
2008 Kraków	Slovakia; Pavol Hochschorner; Peter Hochschorner	Slovakia; Ladislav Škantár; Peter Škantár	Italy; Andrea Benetti; Erik Masoero
2009 Nottingham	Slovakia; Pavol Hochschorner; Peter Hochschorner	France; Damien Troquenet; Mathieu Voyemant	Great Britain; Tim Baillie; Etienne Stott
2010 Bratislava	Slovakia; Ladislav Škantár; Peter Škantár	Czech Republic; Jaroslav Volf; Ondřej Štěpánek	Great Britain; David Florence; Richard Hounslow
2011 La Seu d'Urgell	Slovakia; Pavol Hochschorner; Peter Hochschorner	France; Pierre Labarelle; Nicolas Peschier	Slovakia; Ladislav Škantár; Peter Škantár
2012 Augsburg	Czech Republic; Jaroslav Volf; Ondřej Štěpánek	Slovakia; Pavol Hochschorner; Peter Hochschorner	Germany; Robert Behling; Thomas Becker
2013 Kraków	France; Pierre Labarelle; Nicolas Peschier	Poland; Marcin Pochwała; Piotr Szczepański	Czech Republic; Ondřej Karlovský; Jakub Jáně
2014 Vienna	Slovakia; Ladislav Škantár; Peter Škantár	Poland; Piotr Szczepański; Marcin Pochwała	Slovenia; Luka Božič; Sašo Taljat
2015 Markkleeberg	Germany; Robert Behling; Thomas Becker	Germany; Franz Anton; Jan Benzien	Great Britain; David Florence; Richard Hounslow
2016 Liptovský Mikuláš	Slovakia; Tomáš Kučera; Ján Bátik	Slovenia; Luka Božič; Sašo Taljat	Germany; David Schröder; Nico Bettge
2017 Tacen	France; Pierre Picco; Hugo Biso	Poland; Andrzej Brzeziński; Filip Brzeziński	Czech Republic; Jonáš Kašpar; Marek Šindler
2018 Prague	Czech Republic; Jonáš Kašpar; Marek Šindler	Germany; Robert Behling; Thomas Becker	Czech Republic; Ondřej Karlovský; Jakub Jáně

=== C2 team ===
Debuted: 1996. Discontinued: 2018.

Championships	Gold	Silver	Bronze
1996 Augsburg	Germany; André Ehrenberg & Michael Senft; Rüdiger Hübbers & Udo Raumann; Manfred Berro & Michael Trummer	Poland; Jarosław Nawrocki & Konrad Korzeniewski; Andrzej Wójs & Sławomir Mordarski; Krzysztof Kołomański & Michał Staniszewski	Slovakia; Ľuboš Šoška & Peter Šoška; Milan Kubáň & Marián Olejník; Roman Štrba & Roman Vajs
1998 Roudnice nad Labem	Czech Republic; Petr Štercl & Pavel Štercl; Jaroslav Pospíšil & Jaroslav Pollert; Jaroslav Volf & Ondřej Štěpánek	Slovakia; Milan Kubáň & Marián Olejník; Roman Štrba & Roman Vajs; Pavol Hochschorner & Peter Hochschorner	France; Éric Biau & Bertrand Daille; Philippe Quémerais & Yann Le Pennec; Alexandre Lauvergne & Nathanael Fouquet
2000 Mezzana (non-medal event)	Germany; Kai Walter & Frank Henze; Kay Simon & Robby Simon; André Ehrenberg & Michael Senft	Slovakia; Pavol Hochschorner & Peter Hochschorner; Roman Štrba & Roman Vajs; Ľuboš Šoška & Peter Šoška	Czech Republic; Jaroslav Volf & Ondřej Štěpánek; Jaroslav Pospíšil & Jaroslav Pollert; Marek Jiras & Tomáš Máder
2002 Bratislava	Slovakia; Pavol Hochschorner & Peter Hochschorner; Milan Kubáň & Marián Olejník; Pavol Hric & Roman Vajs	France; Philippe Quémerais & Yann Le Pennec; Martin Braud & Cédric Forgit; Alexandre Lauvergne & Nathanael Fouquet	Germany; Kai Walter & Frank Henze; Kay Simon & Robby Simon; André Ehrenberg & Michael Senft
2004 Skopje (non-medal event)	Czech Republic; Jaroslav Volf & Ondřej Štěpánek; Marek Jiras & Tomáš Máder; Jaroslav Pospíšil & Jaroslav Pollert	Slovakia; Ľuboš Šoška & Peter Šoška; Ladislav Škantár & Peter Škantár; Milan Kubáň & Marián Olejník	Poland; Andrzej Wójs & Sławomir Mordarski; Jarosław Miczek & Wojciech Sekuła; Marcin Pochwała & Paweł Sarna
2005 Tacen	Slovakia; Pavol Hochschorner & Peter Hochschorner; Milan Kubáň & Marián Olejník; Ladislav Škantár & Peter Škantár	Germany; Kay Simon & Robby Simon; Marcus Becker & Stefan Henze; Christian Bahmann & Michael Senft	France; Philippe Quémerais & Yann Le Pennec; Christophe Luquet & Pierre Luquet; Martin Braud & Cédric Forgit
2006 L'Argentière-la-Bessée	Germany; Felix Michel & Sebastian Piersig; David Schröder & Frank Henze; Kay Simon & Robby Simon	France; Philippe Quémerais & Yann Le Pennec; Martin Braud & Cédric Forgit; Christophe Luquet & Pierre Luquet	Czech Republic; Marek Jiras & Tomáš Máder; Jaroslav Volf & Ondřej Štěpánek; Jaroslav Pospíšil & Jaroslav Pollert
2007 Liptovský Mikuláš	Germany; Felix Michel & Sebastian Piersig; Kay Simon & Robby Simon; David Schröder & Frank Henze	Czech Republic; Jaroslav Volf & Ondřej Štěpánek; Marek Jiras & Tomáš Máder; Jaroslav Pospíšil & David Mrůzek	Poland; Marcin Pochwała & Paweł Sarna; Dariusz Wrzosek & Jarosław Miczek; Kamil Gondek & Andrzej Poparda
2008 Kraków	Germany; Marcus Becker & Stefan Henze; Kay Simon & Robby Simon; David Schröder & Frank Henze	Poland; Marcin Pochwała & Paweł Sarna; Dominik Węglarz & Dawid Dobrowolski; Dariusz Wrzosek & Jarosław Miczek	Slovakia; Pavol Hochschorner & Peter Hochschorner; Ladislav Škantár & Peter Škantár; Tomáš Kučera & Ján Bátik
2009 Nottingham	Czech Republic; Jaroslav Volf & Ondřej Štěpánek; Marek Jiras & Tomáš Máder; Jaroslav Pospíšil & David Mrůzek	Great Britain; Tim Baillie & Etienne Stott; David Florence & Richard Hounslow; Daniel Goddard & Colin Radmore	Poland; Marcin Pochwała & Piotr Szczepański; Patryk Brzeziński & Dariusz Chlebek; Grzegorz Wójs & Paweł Sarna
2010 Bratislava	Czech Republic; Tomáš Koplík & Jakub Vrzáň; Lukáš Přinda & Jan Havlíček; Jaroslav Volf & Ondřej Štěpánek	Poland; Paweł Sarna & Dawid Dobrowolski; Patryk Brzeziński & Dariusz Chlebek; Marcin Pochwała & Piotr Szczepański	Great Britain; Tim Baillie & Etienne Stott; David Florence & Richard Hounslow; Daniel Goddard & Colin Radmore
2011 La Seu d'Urgell	Czech Republic; Lukáš Přinda & Jan Havlíček; Tomáš Koplík & Jakub Vrzáň; Václav Hradilek & Štěpán Sehnal	Germany; Marcus Becker & Stefan Henze; David Schröder & Frank Henze; Kai Müller & Kevin Müller	Slovakia; Pavol Hochschorner & Peter Hochschorner; Tomáš Kučera & Ján Bátik; Ladislav Škantár & Peter Škantár
2012 Augsburg	Great Britain; David Florence & Richard Hounslow; Tim Baillie & Etienne Stott; Adam Burgess & Greg Pitt	Czech Republic; Jaroslav Volf & Ondřej Štěpánek; Ondřej Karlovský & Jakub Jáně; Jonáš Kašpar & Marek Šindler	Germany; David Schröder & Frank Henze; Kai Müller & Kevin Müller; Robert Behling & Thomas Becker
2013 Kraków	France; Gauthier Klauss & Matthieu Péché; Pierre Labarelle & Nicolas Peschier; Hugo Biso & Pierre Picco	Poland; Marcin Pochwała & Piotr Szczepański; Filip Brzeziński & Andrzej Brzeziński; Dominik Węglarz & Dariusz Chlebek	Germany; Franz Anton & Jan Benzien; Kai Müller & Kevin Müller; Eric Mendel & Alexander Funk
2014 Vienna	Slovakia; Pavol Hochschorner & Peter Hochschorner; Ladislav Škantár & Peter Škantár; Tomáš Kučera & Ján Bátik	France; Nicolas Peschier & Pierre Labarelle; Gauthier Klauss & Matthieu Péché; Pierre Picco & Hugo Biso	Czech Republic; Ondřej Karlovský & Jakub Jáně; Tomáš Koplík & Jakub Vrzáň; Jonáš Kašpar & Marek Šindler
2015 Markkleeberg	Slovakia; Pavol Hochschorner & Peter Hochschorner; Ladislav Škantár & Peter Škantár; Tomáš Kučera & Ján Bátik	Czech Republic; Ondřej Karlovský & Jakub Jáně; Jonáš Kašpar & Marek Šindler; Tomáš Koplík & Jakub Vrzáň	Russia; Dmitry Larionov & Mikhail Kuznetsov; Maxim Obraztsov & Alexei Suslov; Alexander Ovchinikov & Aleksei Popov
2016 Liptovský Mikuláš	Slovakia; Pavol Hochschorner & Peter Hochschorner; Ladislav Škantár & Peter Škantár; Tomáš Kučera & Ján Bátik	Poland; Piotr Szczepański & Marcin Pochwała; Filip Brzeziński & Andrzej Brzeziński; Michał Wiercioch & Grzegorz Majerczak	Germany; Franz Anton & Jan Benzien; David Schröder & Nico Bettge; Kai Müller & Kevin Müller
2017 Tacen	France; Gauthier Klauss & Matthieu Péché; Pierre Picco & Hugo Biso; Nicolas Scianimanico & Hugo Cailhol	Poland; Marcin Pochwała & Piotr Szczepański; Andrzej Brzeziński & Filip Brzeziński; Michał Wiercioch & Grzegorz Majerczak	Czech Republic; Ondřej Karlovský & Jakub Jáně; Jonáš Kašpar & Marek Šindler; Tomáš Koplík & Jakub Vrzáň
2018 Prague	Germany; Robert Behling & Thomas Becker; Franz Anton & Jan Benzien; David Schröder & Nico Bettge	Czech Republic; Ondřej Karlovský & Jakub Jáně; Tomáš Koplík & Jakub Vrzáň; Jonáš Kašpar & Marek Šindler	France; Gauthier Klauss & Matthieu Péché; Nicolas Scianimanico & Hugo Cailhol; Pierre-Antoine Tillard & Denis Gargaud Chanut

== Men's kayak ==
=== K1 ===
Debuted: 1996.

Championships	Gold	Silver	Bronze
1996 Augsburg	Ian Wiley (IRL)	Miroslav Stanovský (SVK)	Jochen Lettmann (GER)
1998 Roudnice nad Labem	Paul Ratcliffe (GBR)	Thomas Becker (GER)	Andrew Raspin (GBR)
2000 Mezzana	Pierpaolo Ferrazzi (ITA)	Thomas Becker (GER)	Laurent Burtz (FRA)
2002 Bratislava	Paul Ratcliffe (GBR)	Helmut Oblinger (AUT)	Peter Cibák (SVK)
2004 Skopje	Julien Billaut (FRA)	Mathias Röthenmund (SUI)	Daniele Molmenti (ITA)
2005 Tacen	Helmut Oblinger (AUT)	Peter Kauzer (SLO)	Erik Pfannmöller (GER)
2006 L'Argentière-la-Bessée	Fabian Dörfler (GER)	Erik Pfannmöller (GER)	Diego Paolini (ITA)
2007 Liptovský Mikuláš	Ján Šajbidor (SVK)	Peter Kauzer (SLO)	Campbell Walsh (GBR)
2008 Kraków	Campbell Walsh (GBR)	Daniele Molmenti (ITA)	Fabian Dörfler (GER)
2009 Nottingham	Daniele Molmenti (ITA)	Boris Neveu (FRA)	Julien Billaut (FRA)
2010 Bratislava	Peter Kauzer (SLO)	Jure Meglič (SLO)	Vavřinec Hradilek (CZE)
2011 La Seu d'Urgell	Daniele Molmenti (ITA)	Samuel Hernanz (ESP)	Jiří Prskavec (CZE)
2012 Augsburg	Daniele Molmenti (ITA)	Paul Böckelmann (GER)	Hannes Aigner (GER)
2013 Kraków	Jiří Prskavec (CZE)	Michael Kurt (SUI)	Sebastian Schubert (GER)
2014 Vienna	Jiří Prskavec (CZE)	Vít Přindiš (CZE)	Samuel Hernanz (ESP)
2015 Markkleeberg	Boris Neveu (FRA)	Alexander Grimm (GER)	Andrej Málek (SVK)
2016 Liptovský Mikuláš	Jiří Prskavec (CZE)	Vavřinec Hradilek (CZE)	Hannes Aigner (GER)
2017 Tacen	Mateusz Polaczyk (POL)	Dariusz Popiela (POL)	Jiří Prskavec (CZE)
2018 Prague	Peter Kauzer (SLO)	Vít Přindiš (CZE)	Jiří Prskavec (CZE)
2019 Pau	Vít Přindiš (CZE)	Dariusz Popiela (POL)	Quentin Burgi (FRA)
2020 Prague	Jiří Prskavec (CZE)	Peter Kauzer (SLO)	Mateusz Polaczyk (POL)
2021 Ivrea	Vít Přindiš (CZE)	Giovanni De Gennaro (ITA)	Peter Kauzer (SLO)
2022 Liptovský Mikuláš	Jiří Prskavec (CZE)	Giovanni De Gennaro (ITA)	Felix Oschmautz (AUT)
2023 Kraków	Jiří Prskavec (CZE)	Martin Dougoud (SUI)	Joseph Clarke (GBR)
2024 Tacen	Giovanni De Gennaro (ITA)	Mario Leitner (AUT)	Gelindo Chiarello (SUI)
2025 Vaires-sur-Marne	Jiří Prskavec (CZE)	Titouan Castryck (FRA)	Martin Srabotnik (SLO)
2026 Ivrea	Jakub Krejčí (CZE)	Xabier Ferrazzi (ITA)	Giovanni De Gennaro (ITA)

=== K1 team ===
Debuted: 1996.

Championships	Gold	Silver	Bronze
1996 Augsburg	Germany; Jochen Lettmann; Thomas Becker; Thomas Schmidt	Slovenia; Miha Štricelj; Andraž Vehovar; Jure Pelegrini	Austria; Günter Martinsich; Manuel Köhler; Helmut Oblinger
1998 Roudnice nad Labem	Germany; Thomas Becker; Ralf Schaberg; Thomas Schmidt	Czech Republic; Ondřej Raab; Jiří Prskavec; Vojtěch Bareš	Slovenia; Andraž Vehovar; Fedja Marušič; Uroš Kodelja
2000 Mezzana	Italy; Pierpaolo Ferrazzi; Enrico Lazzarotto; Matteo Pontarollo	Slovenia; Miha Terdič; Dejan Kralj; Fedja Marušič	Switzerland; Mathias Röthenmund; Michael Kurt; Beat Mosimann
2002 Bratislava	Germany; Thomas Becker; Thomas Schmidt; Claus Suchanek	Czech Republic; Ondřej Raab; Ivan Pišvejc; Tomáš Kobes	Slovakia; Peter Cibák; Ján Šajbidor; Tomáš Mráz
2004 Skopje	Switzerland; Mathias Röthenmund; Thomas Mosimann; Michael Kurt	Great Britain; Anthony Brown; Campbell Walsh; Huw Swetnam	Czech Republic; Ivan Pišvejc; Lukáš Kubričan; Tomáš Kobes
2005 Tacen	Slovenia; Andrej Nolimal; Peter Kauzer; Dejan Kralj	Germany; Erik Pfannmöller; Fabian Dörfler; Alexander Grimm	Italy; Pierpaolo Ferrazzi; Stefano Cipressi; Daniele Molmenti
2006 L'Argentière-la-Bessée	Slovenia; Peter Kauzer; Dejan Kralj; Jure Meglič	Poland; Grzegorz Polaczyk; Henryk Polaczyk; Dariusz Popiela	Germany; Fabian Dörfler; Alexander Grimm; Erik Pfannmöller
2007 Liptovský Mikuláš	Slovenia; Peter Kauzer; Dejan Kralj; Jure Meglič	Germany; Erik Pfannmöller; Alexander Grimm; Fabian Dörfler	Great Britain; Campbell Walsh; Richard Hounslow; Huw Swetnam
2008 Kraków	Poland; Dariusz Popiela; Grzegorz Polaczyk; Mateusz Polaczyk	Italy; Diego Paolini; Daniele Molmenti; Luca Costa	Switzerland; Michael Kurt; Mathias Röthenmund; Moritz Lüscher
2009 Nottingham	Great Britain; Campbell Walsh; Richard Hounslow; Huw Swetnam	Germany; Alexander Grimm; Tim Maxeiner; Sebastian Schubert	France; Fabien Lefèvre; Boris Neveu; Julien Billaut
2010 Bratislava	Poland; Dariusz Popiela; Mateusz Polaczyk; Grzegorz Polaczyk	Germany; Hannes Aigner; Alexander Grimm; Sebastian Schubert	Slovenia; Peter Kauzer; Dejan Kralj; Jure Meglič
2011 La Seu d'Urgell	Slovenia; Peter Kauzer; Jure Meglič; Simon Brus	Poland; Mateusz Polaczyk; Grzegorz Polaczyk; Dariusz Popiela	France; Fabien Lefèvre; Boris Neveu; Vivien Colober
2012 Augsburg	France; Étienne Daille; Boris Neveu; Bastien Damiens	Germany; Hannes Aigner; Paul Böckelmann; Sebastian Schubert	Austria; Helmut Oblinger; Herwig Natmessnig; Andreas Langer
2013 Kraków	Czech Republic; Vavřinec Hradilek; Jiří Prskavec; Vít Přindiš	Germany; Hannes Aigner; Fabian Dörfler; Sebastian Schubert	Poland; Dariusz Popiela; Grzegorz Polaczyk; Rafał Polaczyk
2014 Vienna	Germany; Sebastian Schubert; Fabian Dörfler; Alexander Grimm	Great Britain; Richard Hounslow; Joseph Clarke; Thomas Brady	Poland; Mateusz Polaczyk; Rafał Polaczyk; Dariusz Popiela
2015 Markkleeberg	Germany; Sebastian Schubert; Hannes Aigner; Alexander Grimm	Great Britain; Richard Hounslow; Joseph Clarke; Bradley Forbes-Cryans	Italy; Daniele Molmenti; Andrea Romeo; Giovanni De Gennaro
2016 Liptovský Mikuláš	Czech Republic; Jiří Prskavec; Vavřinec Hradilek; Vít Přindiš	France; Boris Neveu; Sébastien Combot; Étienne Daille	Spain; Samuel Hernanz; Joan Crespo; Unai Nabaskues
2017 Tacen	Czech Republic; Jiří Prskavec; Ondřej Tunka; Vít Přindiš	France; Mathieu Biazizzo; Sébastien Combot; Boris Neveu	Poland; Mateusz Polaczyk; Maciej Okręglak; Dariusz Popiela
2018 Prague	Czech Republic; Ondřej Tunka; Vít Přindiš; Jiří Prskavec	Poland; Mateusz Polaczyk; Dariusz Popiela; Michał Pasiut	Slovenia; Peter Kauzer; Martin Srabotnik; Niko Testen
2019 Pau	Czech Republic; Jiří Prskavec; Vít Přindiš; Vavřinec Hradilek	Slovenia; Peter Kauzer; Niko Testen; Martin Srabotnik	Germany; Hannes Aigner; Sebastian Schubert; Stefan Hengst
2020 Prague	France; Boris Neveu; Quentin Burgi; Mathurin Madoré	Czech Republic; Jiří Prskavec; Vít Přindiš; Vavřinec Hradilek	Switzerland; Martin Dougoud; Lukas Werro; Dimitri Marx
2021 Ivrea	Czech Republic; Jiří Prskavec; Vavřinec Hradilek; Vít Přindiš	Germany; Hannes Aigner; Tim Maxeiner; Stefan Hengst	Great Britain; Bradley Forbes-Cryans; Joseph Clarke; Christopher Bowers
2022 Liptovský Mikuláš	Czech Republic; Jiří Prskavec; Ondřej Tunka; Vít Přindiš	Poland; Michał Pasiut; Jakub Brzeziński; Dariusz Popiela	Germany; Hannes Aigner; Noah Hegge; Stefan Hengst
2023 Kraków	Spain; Pau Echaniz; David Llorente; Miquel Travé	Poland; Dariusz Popiela; Mateusz Polaczyk; Michał Pasiut	France; Titouan Castryck; Boris Neveu; Benjamin Renia
2024 Tacen	Czech Republic; Jiří Prskavec; Vít Přindiš; Jakub Krejčí	Austria; Felix Oschmautz; Mario Leitner; Moritz Kremslehner	France; Titouan Castryck; Anatole Delassus; Vincent Delahaye
2025 Vaires-sur-Marne	Germany; Noah Hegge; Stefan Hengst; Hannes Aigner	France; Titouan Castryck; Benjamin Renia; Anatole Delassus	Spain; Pau Echaniz; Miquel Travé; David Llorente
2026 Ivrea	France; Titouan Castryck; Anatole Delassus; Martin Cornu	Czech Republic; Jakub Krejčí; Jiří Prskavec; Matyáš Novák	Great Britain; Joseph Clarke; Sam Leaver; Ben Haylett

=== Kayak Cross ===
Debuted: 2021 (as Extreme K1)

Championships	Gold	Silver	Bronze
2021 Ivrea	Vít Přindiš (CZE)	Dimitri Marx (SUI)	Joseph Clarke (GBR)
2022 Liptovský Mikuláš	Jan Rohrer (SUI)	Mario Leitner (AUT)	Felix Oschmautz (AUT)
2023 Kraków	Ondřej Tunka (CZE)	Felix Oschmautz (AUT)	Vít Přindiš (CZE)
2024 Tacen	Joseph Clarke (GBR)	Jan Rohrer (SUI)	David Llorente (ESP)
2025 Vaires-sur-Marne	Jakub Krejčí (CZE)	Benjamin Renia (FRA)	Sam Leaver (GBR)
2026 Ivrea	Matyáš Novák (CZE)	Mathurin Madoré (FRA)	Ianis Triomphe (FRA)

=== Kayak Cross Individual ===
Debuted: 2024

Championships	Gold	Silver	Bronze
2024 Tacen	Vít Přindiš (CZE)	Jonny Dickson (GBR)	Martin Dougoud (SUI)
2025 Vaires-sur-Marne	Gabriel De Coster (BEL)	Mathurin Madoré (FRA)	Benjamin Renia (FRA)
2026 Ivrea	Giovanni De Gennaro (ITA)	Mathurin Madoré (FRA)	Manuel Ochoa (ESP)

== Women's canoe ==
=== C1 ===
Debuted: 2010.

Championships	Gold	Silver	Bronze
2010 Bratislava	Katarína Macová (SVK)	Jana Dukátová (SVK)	Caroline Loir (FRA)
2011 La Seu d'Urgell	Caroline Loir (FRA)	Mira Louen (GER)	Lena Stöcklin (GER)
2012 Augsburg	Mira Louen (GER)	Mallory Franklin (GBR)	Michaela Grimm (GER)
2013 Kraków	Caroline Loir (FRA)	Julia Schmid (AUT)	Núria Vilarrubla (ESP)
2014 Vienna	Caroline Loir (FRA)	Julia Schmid (AUT)	Kateřina Hošková (CZE)
2015 Markkleeberg	Kimberley Woods (GBR)	Mallory Franklin (GBR)	Núria Vilarrubla (ESP)
2016 Liptovský Mikuláš	Núria Vilarrubla (ESP)	Kateřina Hošková (CZE)	Mallory Franklin (GBR)
2017 Tacen	Kimberley Woods (GBR)	Tereza Fišerová (CZE)	Nadine Weratschnig (AUT)
2018 Prague	Viktoria Wolffhardt (AUT)	Mallory Franklin (GBR)	Elena Apel (GER)
2019 Pau	Mallory Franklin (GBR)	Núria Vilarrubla (ESP)	Kimberley Woods (GBR)
2020 Prague	Gabriela Satková (CZE)	Tereza Fišerová (CZE)	Lucie Prioux (FRA)
2021 Ivrea	Miren Lazkano (ESP)	Tereza Fišerová (CZE)	Elena Apel (GER)
2022 Liptovský Mikuláš	Mallory Franklin (GBR)	Marjorie Delassus (FRA)	Tereza Fišerová (CZE)
2023 Kraków	Elena Lilik (GER)	Klaudia Zwolińska (POL)	Mallory Franklin (GBR)
2024 Tacen	Andrea Herzog (GER)	Gabriela Satková (CZE)	Marjorie Delassus (FRA)
2025 Vaires-sur-Marne	Mònica Dòria (AND)	Laurène Roisin (FRA)	Doriane Delassus (FRA)
2026 Ivrea	Mallory Franklin (GBR)	Doriane Delassus (FRA)	Tereza Kneblová (CZE)

=== C1 team ===
Debuted: 2012.

Championships	Gold	Silver	Bronze
2012 Augsburg (non-medal event)	Germany; Michaela Grimm; Mira Louen; Lena Stöcklin	France; Caroline Loir; Claire Jacquet; Oriane Rebours	Great Britain; Mallory Franklin; Kimberley Woods; Alice Spencer
2014 Vienna (non-medal event)	Great Britain; Mallory Franklin; Jasmine Royle; Eilidh Gibson	Spain; Núria Vilarrubla; Miren Lazkano; Klara Olazabal	Czech Republic; Kateřina Hošková; Monika Jančová; Jana Matulková
2015 Markkleeberg	Spain; Núria Vilarrubla; Klara Olazabal; Annebel van der Knijff	Czech Republic; Kateřina Hošková; Monika Jančová; Tereza Fišerová	Great Britain; Kimberley Woods; Mallory Franklin; Eilidh Gibson
2016 Liptovský Mikuláš	Great Britain; Kimberley Woods; Mallory Franklin; Eilidh Gibson	Czech Republic; Kateřina Hošková; Monika Jančová; Martina Satková	Germany; Andrea Herzog; Lena Stöcklin; Birgit Ohmayer
2017 Tacen	Great Britain; Kimberley Woods; Mallory Franklin; Eilidh Gibson	Germany; Andrea Herzog; Lena Stöcklin; Birgit Ohmayer	Czech Republic; Tereza Fišerová; Monika Jančová; Eva Říhová
2018 Prague	Great Britain; Mallory Franklin; Kimberley Woods; Bethan Forrow	France; Lucie Prioux; Lucie Baudu; Claire Jacquet	Spain; Núria Vilarrubla; Miren Lazkano; Klara Olazabal
2019 Pau	Great Britain; Mallory Franklin; Kimberley Woods; Sophie Ogilvie	Germany; Elena Apel; Andrea Herzog; Jasmin Schornberg	Czech Republic; Tereza Fišerová; Eva Říhová; Kateřina Havlíčková
2020 Prague	Czech Republic; Tereza Fišerová; Gabriela Satková; Tereza Kneblová	Slovenia; Alja Kozorog; Eva Alina Hočevar; Lea Novak	France; Lucie Baudu; Claire Jacquet; Lucie Prioux
2021 Ivrea	Slovakia; Simona Glejteková; Zuzana Paňková; Monika Škáchová	Great Britain; Kimberley Woods; Mallory Franklin; Sophie Ogilvie	France; Marjorie Delassus; Lucie Prioux; Angèle Hug
2022 Liptovský Mikuláš	Slovakia; Emanuela Luknárová; Zuzana Paňková; Soňa Stanovská	France; Laurène Roisin; Marjorie Delassus; Lucie Baudu	Czech Republic; Gabriela Satková; Tereza Fišerová; Martina Satková
2023 Kraków	Czech Republic; Gabriela Satková; Tereza Fišerová; Tereza Kneblová	Great Britain; Mallory Franklin; Kimberley Woods; Sophie Ogilvie	Germany; Andrea Herzog; Nele Bayn; Elena Lilik
2024 Tacen	Czech Republic; Tereza Kneblová; Gabriela Satková; Martina Satková	Slovenia; Eva Alina Hočevar; Lea Novak; Alja Kozorog	Great Britain; Mallory Franklin; Kimberley Woods; Ellis Miller
2025 Vaires-sur-Marne	Czech Republic; Gabriela Satková; Martina Satková; Adriana Morenová	France; Angèle Hug; Laurène Roisin; Doriane Delassus	Italy; Elena Borghi; Marta Bertoncelli; Elena Micozzi
2026 Ivrea	Italy; Marta Bertoncelli; Elena Borghi; Elena Micozzi	France; Angèle Hug; Doriane Delassus; Marjorie Delassus	Great Britain; Kimberley Woods; Mallory Franklin; Ellis Miller

== Women's kayak ==
=== K1 ===
Debuted: 1996.

Championships	Gold	Silver	Bronze
1996 Augsburg	Marcela Sadilová (CZE)	Štěpánka Hilgertová (CZE)	Elena Kaliská (SVK)
1998 Roudnice nad Labem	Elena Kaliská (SVK)	Štěpánka Hilgertová (CZE)	Sandra Friedli (SUI)
2000 Mezzana	Štěpánka Hilgertová (CZE)	Brigitte Guibal (FRA)	Irena Pavelková (CZE)
2002 Bratislava	Elena Kaliská (SVK)	Irena Pavelková (CZE)	Štěpánka Hilgertová (CZE)
2004 Skopje	Elena Kaliská (SVK)	Jenny Apel (GER)	Irena Pavelková (CZE)
2005 Tacen	Mandy Planert (GER)	Štěpánka Hilgertová (CZE)	Irena Pavelková (CZE)
2006 L'Argentière-la-Bessée	Elena Kaliská (SVK)	Jennifer Bongardt (GER)	Mathilde Pichery (FRA)
2007 Liptovský Mikuláš	Violetta Oblinger-Peters (AUT)	Mandy Planert (GER)	Štěpánka Hilgertová (CZE)
2008 Kraków	Štěpánka Hilgertová (CZE)	Marie Řihošková (CZE)	Irena Pavelková (CZE)
2009 Nottingham	Elena Kaliská (SVK)	Émilie Fer (FRA)	Mathilde Pichery (FRA)
2010 Bratislava	Jana Dukátová (SVK)	Corinna Kuhnle (AUT)	Urša Kragelj (SLO)
2011 La Seu d'Urgell	Claudia Bär (GER)	Jana Dukátová (SVK)	Lizzie Neave (GBR)
2012 Augsburg	Carole Bouzidi (FRA)	Melanie Pfeifer (GER)	Fiona Pennie (GBR)
2013 Kraków	Fiona Pennie (GBR)	Stefanie Horn (ITA)	Viktoria Wolffhardt (AUT)
2014 Vienna	Ricarda Funk (GER)	Melanie Pfeifer (GER)	Émilie Fer (FRA)
2015 Markkleeberg	Maialen Chourraut (ESP)	Ricarda Funk (GER)	Kateřina Kudějová (CZE)
2016 Liptovský Mikuláš	Melanie Pfeifer (GER)	Urša Kragelj (SLO)	Jana Dukátová (SVK)
2017 Tacen	Corinna Kuhnle (AUT)	Stefanie Horn (ITA)	Marie-Zélia Lafont (FRA)
2018 Prague	Ricarda Funk (GER)	Corinna Kuhnle (AUT)	Fiona Pennie (GBR)
2019 Pau	Amálie Hilgertová (CZE)	Mallory Franklin (GBR)	Jasmin Schornberg (GER)
2020 Prague	Kateřina Kudějová (CZE)	Camille Prigent (FRA)	Amálie Hilgertová (CZE)
2021 Ivrea	Corinna Kuhnle (AUT)	Eva Terčelj (SLO)	Ricarda Funk (GER)
2022 Liptovský Mikuláš	Stefanie Horn (ITA); Eliška Mintálová (SVK)	-	Mallory Franklin (GBR)
2023 Kraków	Ricarda Funk (GER)	Klaudia Zwolińska (POL)	Tereza Fišerová (CZE)
2024 Tacen	Klaudia Zwolińska (POL)	Zuzana Paňková (SVK)	Mallory Franklin (GBR)
2025 Vaires-sur-Marne	Ricarda Funk (GER)	Gabriela Satková (CZE)	Zuzana Paňková (SVK)
2026 Ivrea	Klaudia Zwolińska (POL)	Lucia Pistoni (ITA)	Emily Apel (GER)

=== K1 team ===
Debuted: 1996.

Championships	Gold	Silver	Bronze
1996 Augsburg	Czech Republic; Marcela Sadilová; Štěpánka Hilgertová; Irena Pavelková	Germany; Kordula Striepecke; Evi Huss; Elisabeth Micheler-Jones	Italy; Cristina Giai Pron; Barbara Nadalin; Lorenza Lazzarotto
1998 Roudnice nad Labem	Czech Republic; Štěpánka Hilgertová; Irena Pavelková; Marcela Sadilová	Great Britain; Rachel Crosbee; Laura Blakeman; Heather Corrie	Germany; Kordula Striepecke; Evi Huss; Mandy Planert
2000 Mezzana	Slovakia; Elena Kaliská; Gabriela Stacherová; Gabriela Brosková	Czech Republic; Marcela Sadilová; Štěpánka Hilgertová; Irena Pavelková	Germany; Mandy Planert; Evi Huss; Susanne Hirt
2002 Bratislava	Czech Republic; Marie Řihošková; Irena Pavelková; Štěpánka Hilgertová	Slovakia; Elena Kaliská; Gabriela Stacherová; Gabriela Zamišková	France; Anne-Lise Bardet; Anne-Line Poncet; Mathilde Pichery
2004 Skopje (non-medal event)	Czech Republic; Irena Pavelková; Marcela Sadilová; Marie Řihošková	Slovakia; Elena Kaliská; Gabriela Stacherová; Jana Dukátová	Great Britain; Laura Blakeman; Heather Corrie; Kimberley Walsh
2005 Tacen	Slovakia; Gabriela Zamišková; Jana Dukátová; Elena Kaliská	Germany; Claudia Bär; Mandy Planert; Heike Frauenrath	Austria; Julia Schmid; Violetta Oblinger-Peters; Corinna Kuhnle
2006 L'Argentière-la-Bessée	Slovakia; Elena Kaliská; Jana Dukátová; Gabriela Stacherová	Czech Republic; Štěpánka Hilgertová; Irena Pavelková; Marie Řihošková	France; Mathilde Pichery; Aline Tornare; Marie Gaspard
2007 Liptovský Mikuláš	Germany; Jennifer Bongardt; Mandy Planert; Jasmin Schornberg	Slovakia; Elena Kaliská; Jana Dukátová; Gabriela Stacherová	Great Britain; Fiona Pennie; Laura Blakeman; Lizzie Neave
2008 Kraków	Germany; Claudia Bär; Mandy Planert; Jasmin Schornberg	Slovakia; Jana Dukátová; Elena Kaliská; Gabriela Stacherová	Great Britain; Fiona Pennie; Louise Donington; Laura Blakeman
2009 Nottingham	Great Britain; Lizzie Neave; Louise Donington; Laura Blakeman	Slovakia; Elena Kaliská; Jana Dukátová; Gabriela Stacherová	Germany; Jennifer Bongardt; Melanie Pfeifer; Jasmin Schornberg
2010 Bratislava	Germany; Melanie Pfeifer; Jasmin Schornberg; Jennifer Bongardt	Poland; Joanna Mędoń; Małgorzata Milczarek; Natalia Pacierpnik	Slovakia; Jana Dukátová; Dana Beňušová; Gabriela Stacherová
2011 La Seu d'Urgell	Czech Republic; Kateřina Kudějová; Štěpánka Hilgertová; Irena Pavelková	Austria; Corinna Kuhnle; Violetta Oblinger-Peters; Viktoria Wolffhardt	Slovakia; Jana Dukátová; Elena Kaliská; Dana Mann
2012 Augsburg	Germany; Cindy Pöschel; Melanie Pfeifer; Jasmin Schornberg	France; Émilie Fer; Carole Bouzidi; Caroline Loir	Slovakia; Jana Dukátová; Elena Kaliská; Dana Mann
2013 Kraków	France; Émilie Fer; Marie-Zélia Lafont; Carole Bouzidi	Great Britain; Lizzie Neave; Fiona Pennie; Bethan Latham	Czech Republic; Štěpánka Hilgertová; Kateřina Kudějová; Eva Ornstová
2014 Vienna	Czech Republic; Štěpánka Hilgertová; Kateřina Kudějová; Veronika Vojtová	Spain; Maialen Chourraut; Irati Goikoetxea; Marta Martínez	France; Carole Bouzidi; Nouria Newman; Émilie Fer
2015 Markkleeberg	Slovakia; Jana Dukátová; Kristína Nevařilová; Kristína Zárubová	Poland; Natalia Pacierpnik; Klaudia Zwolińska; Sara Ćwik	France; Carole Bouzidi; Marie-Zélia Lafont; Émilie Fer
2016 Liptovský Mikuláš	Great Britain; Fiona Pennie; Kimberley Woods; Lizzie Neave	Germany; Melanie Pfeifer; Jasmin Schornberg; Lisa Fritsche	Slovakia; Elena Kaliská; Jana Dukátová; Kristína Nevařilová
2017 Tacen	Slovenia; Urša Kragelj; Eva Terčelj; Ajda Novak	Spain; Irati Goikoetxea; Maialen Chourraut; Marta Martínez	France; Lucie Baudu; Marie-Zélia Lafont; Camille Prigent
2018 Prague	Germany; Ricarda Funk; Jasmin Schornberg; Lisa Fritsche	Austria; Corinna Kuhnle; Lisa Leitner; Viktoria Wolffhardt	Czech Republic; Kateřina Kudějová; Barbora Valíková; Veronika Vojtová
2019 Pau	France; Marie-Zélia Lafont; Lucie Baudu; Camille Prigent	Germany; Ricarda Funk; Jasmin Schornberg; Elena Apel	Austria; Corinna Kuhnle; Viktoria Wolffhardt; Nina Weratschnig
2020 Prague	Czech Republic; Kateřina Kudějová; Veronika Vojtová; Antonie Galušková	France; Camille Prigent; Lucie Baudu; Marjorie Delassus	Austria; Corinna Kuhnle; Nina Weratschnig; Antonia Oschmautz
2021 Ivrea	Great Britain; Kimberley Woods; Fiona Pennie; Mallory Franklin	Austria; Corinna Kuhnle; Antonia Oschmautz; Viktoria Wolffhardt	Czech Republic; Kateřina Minařík Kudějová; Veronika Vojtová; Antonie Galušková
2022 Liptovský Mikuláš	France; Camille Prigent; Romane Prigent; Emma Vuitton	Great Britain; Kimberley Woods; Mallory Franklin; Megan Hamer-Evans	Poland; Klaudia Zwolińska; Natalia Pacierpnik; Dominika Brzeska
2023 Kraków	France; Marjorie Delassus; Camille Prigent; Emma Vuitton	Czech Republic; Tereza Fišerová; Amálie Hilgertová; Antonie Galušková	Germany; Ricarda Funk; Elena Lilik; Emily Apel
2024 Tacen	Slovenia; Eva Terčelj; Eva Alina Hočevar; Ajda Novak	France; Camille Prigent; Emma Vuitton; Coline Charel	Czech Republic; Antonie Galušková; Kateřina Beková; Tereza Fišerová
2025 Vaires-sur-Marne	Czech Republic; Gabriela Satková; Lucie Nesnídalová; Antonie Galušková	Spain; Maialen Chourraut; Laia Sorribes; Leire Goñi	Great Britain; Kimberley Woods; Lois Leaver; Nikita Setchell
2026 Ivrea	Slovakia; Eliška Mintálová; Zuzana Paňková; Soňa Stanovská	Italy; Stefanie Horn; Agata Spagnol; Lucia Pistoni	France; Emma Vuitton; Camille Prigent; Marjorie Delassus

=== Kayak Cross ===
Debuted: 2021 (as Extreme K1)

Championships	Gold	Silver	Bronze
2021 Ivrea	Kateřina Minařík Kudějová (CZE)	Corinna Kuhnle (AUT)	Veronika Vojtová (CZE)
2022 Liptovský Mikuláš	Tereza Fišerová (CZE)	Mallory Franklin (GBR)	Ajda Novak (SLO)
2023 Kraków	Viktoriia Us (UKR)	Ricarda Funk (GER)	Stefanie Horn (ITA)
2024 Tacen	Alena Marx (SUI)	Camille Prigent (FRA)	Nikita Setchell (GBR)
2025 Vaires-sur-Marne	Camille Prigent (FRA)	Emma Vuitton (FRA)	Olga Samková (CZE)
2026 Ivrea	Tereza Kneblová (CZE)	Mallory Franklin (GBR)	Klaudia Zwolińska (POL)

=== Kayak Cross Individual ===
Debuted: 2024

Championships	Gold	Silver	Bronze
2024 Tacen	Alena Marx (SUI)	Klaudia Zwolińska (POL)	Camille Prigent (FRA)
2025 Vaires-sur-Marne	Camille Prigent (FRA)	Angèle Hug (FRA)	Kimberley Woods (GBR)
2026 Ivrea	Kimberley Woods (GBR)	Klaudia Zwolińska (POL)	Lucia Pistoni (ITA)
