= 2004 European Canoe Slalom Championships =

The 2004 European Canoe Slalom Championships took place in Skopje, Macedonia between June 4 and 6, 2004 under the auspices of the European Canoe Association (ECA). It was the 5th edition. The competitors took part in 8 events, but medals were awarded for only 6 of them. The C2 team event and the K1 women's team event only had 4 teams participating. An event must have at least 5 nations taking part in order to count as a medal event.

== Medal summary ==
=== Men's results ===
==== Canoe ====
Event	Gold	Points	Silver	Points	Bronze	Points
C1	Tomáš Indruch (CZE)	200.82	Krzysztof Bieryt (POL)	200.92	Nico Bettge (GER)	201.43
C1 team	Czech Republic; Tomáš Indruch; Jan Mašek; Ondřej Pinkava	226.77	Slovakia; Alexander Slafkovský; Dušan Ovčarík; Juraj Minčík	228.05	Slovenia; Simon Hočevar; Dejan Stevanovič; Jošt Zakrajšek	234.86
C2	Czech Republic; Jaroslav Volf; Ondřej Štěpánek	207.34	France; Martin Braud; Cédric Forgit	210.17	Slovakia; Ladislav Škantár; Peter Škantár	212.37
C2 team (non-medal event)	Czech Republic; Jaroslav Volf & Ondřej Štěpánek; Marek Jiras & Tomáš Máder; Jaroslav Pospíšil & Jaroslav Pollert	246.91	Slovakia; Ľuboš Šoška & Peter Šoška; Ladislav Škantár & Peter Škantár; Milan Kubáň & Marián Olejník	251.52	Poland; Andrzej Wójs & Sławomir Mordarski; Jarosław Miczek & Wojciech Sekuła; Marcin Pochwała & Paweł Sarna	254.45

==== Kayak ====
Event	Gold	Points	Silver	Points	Bronze	Points
K1	Julien Billaut (FRA)	190.34	Mathias Röthenmund (SUI)	191.66	Daniele Molmenti (ITA)	192.16
K1 team	Switzerland; Mathias Röthenmund; Thomas Mosimann; Michael Kurt	218.86	United Kingdom; Anthony Brown; Campbell Walsh; Huw Swetnam	220.36	Czech Republic; Ivan Pišvejc; Lukáš Kubričan; Tomáš Kobes	221.82

=== Women's results ===
==== Kayak ====
Event	Gold	Points	Silver	Points	Bronze	Points
K1	Elena Kaliská (SVK)	209.40	Jenny Apel (GER)	212.70	Irena Pavelková (CZE)	213.76
K1 team (non-medal event)	Czech Republic; Irena Pavelková; Marcela Sadilová; Marie Řihošková	246.58	Slovakia; Elena Kaliská; Gabriela Stacherová; Jana Dukátová	257.48	United Kingdom; Laura Blakeman; Heather Corrie; Kimberley Walsh	261.04

== Medal table ==
Rank	Nation	Gold	Silver	Bronze	Total
1	Czech Republic (CZE)	3	0	2	5
2	Slovakia (SVK)	1	1	1	3
3	France (FRA)	1	1	0	2
3	Switzerland (SUI)	1	1	0	2
5	Germany (GER)	0	1	1	2
6	Great Britain (GBR)	0	1	0	1
6	Poland (POL)	0	1	0	1
8	Italy (ITA)	0	0	1	1
8	Slovenia (SLO)	0	0	1	1
Totals (9 entries)		6	6	6	18
