= Ján Bátik =

Slovak slalom canoeist (born 1986)

Personal information
- Nationality: Slovak
- Born: 17 January 1986 (age 40) Liptovský Mikuláš, Czechoslovakia
- Height: 1.76 m (5 ft 9 in)
- Weight: 75 kg (165 lb)

Sport
- Country: Slovakia
- Sport: Canoe slalom
- Event: C2, Mixed C2, C1
Medal record
Men's canoe slalom
Representing Slovakia
World Championships
Gold medal – first place	2009 La Seu d'Urgell	C2 team
Silver medal – second place	2011 Bratislava	C2 team
Silver medal – second place	2013 Prague	C2 team
Silver medal – second place	2014 Deep Creek Lake	C2 team
Bronze medal – third place	2007 Foz do Iguaçu	C2 team
European Championships
Gold medal – first place	2014 Vienna	C2 team
Gold medal – first place	2015 Markkleeberg	C2 team
Gold medal – first place	2016 Liptovský Mikuláš	C2
Gold medal – first place	2016 Liptovský Mikuláš	C2 team
Bronze medal – third place	2008 Kraków	C2 team
Bronze medal – third place	2011 La Seu d'Urgell	C2 team
U23 European Championships
Gold medal – first place	2006 Nottingham	C2
Bronze medal – third place	2008 Solkan	C2
Junior World Championships
Silver medal – second place	2004 Lofer	C1 team
Bronze medal – third place	2002 Nowy Sącz	C1 team
Junior European Championships
Bronze medal – third place	2004 Kraków	C1

Ján Bátik (born 17 January 1986 in Liptovský Mikuláš) is a retired Slovak slalom canoeist who competed at the international level from 2002 to 2018.

He competed in the C1 event until 2005. He raced in the C2 event together with Tomáš Kučera from 2006 until 2018, when the discipline was discontinued. He also competed in the mixed C2 event alongside Simona Maceková in 2017 and Soňa Stanovská in 2018.

Bátik and Kučera won five medals in the C2 team event at the ICF Canoe Slalom World Championships with a gold (2009), three silvers (2011, 2013, 2014) and a bronze (2007). They also won 4 golds and 2 bronzes at the European Championships, including a gold medal in the C2 event at the 2016 European Championships on their home course in Liptovský Mikuláš.

== Career statistics ==
=== Major championships results timeline ===
Event		2007	2008	2009	2010	2011	2012	2013	2014	2015	2016	2017	2018
World Championships	C2	17	Not held	6	10	9	Not held	14	18	22	Not held	8	Not held
World Championships	Mixed C2	Not held										8	5
World Championships	C2 team	3	Not held	1	4	2	Not held	2	2	6	Not held	3 (Note: Not a medal event due to low number of participating nations)	Not held
European Championships	C2	4	11	12	6	21	10	16	21	12	1	16	6
European Championships	C2 team	6	3	6	5	3	6	4	1	1	1	4	4

=== World Cup individual podiums ===
Season	Date	Venue	Position	Event
2018	23 Jun 2018	Liptovský Mikuláš	1st	Mixed C2
2018	30 Jun 2018	Kraków	2nd	Mixed C2
