= Campbell Walsh =

Scottish slalom canoeist

Medal record

Men's canoe slalom

Representing Great Britain

Olympic Games
Silver medal – second place	2004 Athens	K1

World Championships
Silver medal – second place	2009 La Seu d'Urgell	K1 team
Bronze medal – third place	2006 Prague	K1
Bronze medal – third place	2007 Foz do Iguaçu	K1

European Championships
Gold medal – first place	2008 Kraków	K1
Gold medal – first place	2009 Nottingham	K1 team
Silver medal – second place	2004 Skopje	K1 team
Bronze medal – third place	2007 Liptovský Mikuláš	K1
Bronze medal – third place	2007 Liptovský Mikuláš	K1 team

Campbell Walsh (born 26 November 1977 in Glasgow) is a Scottish slalom canoeist who competed at the international level from 1995 to 2012. Competing in two Summer Olympics, he won a silver medal in the K1 event in Athens in 2004.

Walsh won three medals at the ICF Canoe Slalom World Championships with a silver (K1 team: 2009) and two individual bronzes (K1: 2006, 2007). He is the overall World Cup Champion in K1 from 2004. He is the 2008 individual European Champion, and the 2009 European Team Champion along with Richard Hounslow and Huw Swetnam. He also has 1 silver and 2 bronze medals from the European Championships.

== World Cup individual podiums ==
Season	Date	Venue	Position	Event
2003	11 May 2003	Penrith	2nd	K1
2004	25 Apr 2004	Athens	2nd	K1
2004	23 May 2004	La Seu d'Urgell	2nd	K1
2004	17 Jul 2004	Augsburg	3rd	K1
2005	16 Jul 2005	Augsburg	2nd	K1
2006	5 Aug 2006	Prague	3rd	K1^{1}
2009	5 Jul 2009	Bratislava	1st	K1

^{1} World Championship counting for World Cup points
