= Juraj Minčík =

Slovak slalom canoeist

Personal information
- Nationality: Slovak
- Born: 27 March 1977 (age 49) Spišská Stará Ves, Czechoslovakia
- Height: 1.81 m (5 ft 11 in)
- Weight: 76 kg (168 lb)

Sport
- Country: Slovakia
- Sport: Canoe slalom
- Event: C1
Medal record
Men's canoe slalom
Representing Slovakia
Olympic Games
Bronze medal – third place	2000 Sydney	C1
World Championships
Gold medal – first place	1997 Três Coroas	C1 team
Gold medal – first place	2003 Augsburg	C1 team
Bronze medal – third place	1995 Nottingham	C1 team
European Championships
Gold medal – first place	1998 Roudnice nad Labem	C1 team
Gold medal – first place	2000 Mezzana	C1 team
Gold medal – first place	2002 Bratislava	C1 team
Gold medal – first place	2005 Tacen	C1 team
Gold medal – first place	2007 Liptovský Mikuláš	C1 team
Silver medal – second place	2000 Mezzana	C1
Silver medal – second place	2004 Skopje	C1 team
Silver medal – second place	2006 L'Argentière-la-Bessée	C1 team
Junior European Championships
Gold medal – first place	1995 Liptovský Mikuláš	C1 team
Bronze medal – third place	1995 Liptovský Mikuláš	C1

Juraj Minčík (born 27 March 1977 in Spišská Stará Ves) is a Slovak slalom canoeist who competed at the international level from 1993 to 2008, specializing in the C1 event.

He competed at two Summer Olympics and won a bronze medal in the C1 event in Sydney in 2000, where he shared the podium with his fellow Slovak Michal Martikán. Four years earlier he finished 15th in the C1 event at the Atlanta games in Ocoee.

Minčík also won three medals in the C1 team event at the ICF Canoe Slalom World Championships with two golds (1997, 2003) and a bronze (1995). At the European Championships he won a total 8 medals (5 golds and 3 silvers).

As a coach he led Ladislav Škantár and Peter Škantár to Olympic gold and Matej Beňuš to Olympic silver at the 2016 Summer Olympics.

== Career statistics ==
=== Major championships results timeline ===
Event		1993	1994	1995	1996	1997	1998	1999	2000	2001	2002	2003	2004	2005	2006	2007
Olympic Games	C1	Not held			15	Not held			3	Not held			—	Not held		
World Championships	C1	23	Not held	32	Not held	7	Not held	9	Not held		4	15	Not held	6	15	12
World Championships	C1 team	13	Not held	3	Not held	1	Not held	6	Not held		4	1	Not held	—	4	9
European Championships	C1	Not held			8	Not held	10	Not held	2	Not held	11	Not held	6	7	19	7
European Championships	C1 team	Not held			6	Not held	1	Not held	1	Not held	1	Not held	2	1	2	1

=== World Cup individual podiums ===
	1st place, gold medalist(s)	2nd place, silver medalist(s)	3rd place, bronze medalist(s)	Total
C1	3	7	5	15

Season	Date	Venue	Position	Event
1998	21 June 1998	Tacen	3rd	C1
1998	2 August 1998	Wausau	3rd	C1
1999	24 June 1999	Tacen	3rd	C1
1999	22 August 1999	Augsburg	2nd	C1
2000	30 April 2000	Penrith	2nd	C1
2000	23 July 2000	Prague	2nd	C1
2000	30 July 2000	Augsburg	1st	C1
2001	27 May 2001	Goumois	1st	C1
2001	3 June 2001	Merano	2nd	C1
2001	29 July 2001	Augsburg	1st	C1
2002	28 July 2002	Tacen	3rd	C1
2003	31 July 2003	Bratislava	3rd	C1
2005	17 July 2005	Augsburg	2nd	C1
2006	4 June 2006	Augsburg	2nd	C1
2006	11 June 2006	La Seu d'Urgell	2nd	C1
