= Vrzáň =

Vrzáň (feminine: Vrzáňová) is a Czech surname. Notable people with the surname include:

- Alena Vrzáňová (1931–2015), Czech figure skater
- Jakub Vrzáň (born 1987), Czech slalom canoeist
