= Tomáš Indruch =

Czech slalom canoeist (born 1976)

Medal record

Men's canoe slalom

Representing Czech Republic

World Championships
Silver medal – second place	2006 Prague	C1 team
Bronze medal – third place	2003 Augsburg	C1 team
Bronze medal – third place	2005 Penrith	C1 team
Bronze medal – third place	2007 Foz do Iguaçu	C1 team
Bronze medal – third place	2011 Bratislava	C1 team

European Championships
Gold medal – first place	2004 Skopje	C1
Gold medal – first place	2004 Skopje	C1 team
Gold medal – first place	2009 Nottingham	C1 team
Silver medal – second place	2000 Mezzana	C1 team
Bronze medal – third place	2005 Tacen	C1 team
Bronze medal – third place	2006 L'Argentière-la-Bessée	C1
Bronze medal – third place	2006 L'Argentière-la-Bessée	C1 team
Bronze medal – third place	2011 La Seu d'Urgell	C1 team

Junior World Championships
Gold medal – first place	1994 Wausau	C1 team

Tomáš Indruch (born 10 May 1976 in Hradec Králové) is a Czech slalom canoeist who competed at the international level from 1994 to 2012.

He won five medals in the C1 team event at the ICF Canoe Slalom World Championships with a silver (2006) and four bronzes (2003, 2005, 2007, 2011). He also won eight medals at the European Championships (3 golds, 1 silver and 4 bronzes).

Indruch also competed in two Summer Olympics, earning his best finish of fifth in the C1 event in Athens in 2004.

== World Cup individual podiums ==
Season	Date	Venue	Position	Event
2003	13 Jul 2003	Tacen	1st	C1
2004	11 Jul 2004	Prague	2nd	C1
2006	2 Jul 2006	L'Argentière-la-Bessée	3rd	C1^{1}
2008	6 Jul 2008	Augsburg	2nd	C1

^{1} European Championship counting for World Cup points
