= Luca Costa =

Italian slalom canoeist

Medal record

Men's canoe slalom

Representing Italy

World Championships
Silver medal – second place	2002 Bourg St.-Maurice	K-1 team

European Championships
Silver medal – second place	2008 Kraków	K-1 team

Luca Costa is an Italian slalom canoeist who has competed since the early 2000s.

He won a silver medal in the K-1 team event at the 2002 ICF Canoe Slalom World Championships in Bourg St.-Maurice and again at the 2008 European Championships in Kraków.
