= Julia Schmid =

Austrian canoeist (born 1988)

Medal record

Women's canoe slalom

Representing Austria

World Championships
Bronze medal – third place	2005 Penrith	K1 team
Bronze medal – third place	2015 London	C1 team

European Championships
Silver medal – second place	2013 Kraków	C1
Silver medal – second place	2014 Vienna	C1
Bronze medal – third place	2005 Tacen	K1 team

U23 European Championships
Silver medal – second place	2011 Banja Luka	K1 team

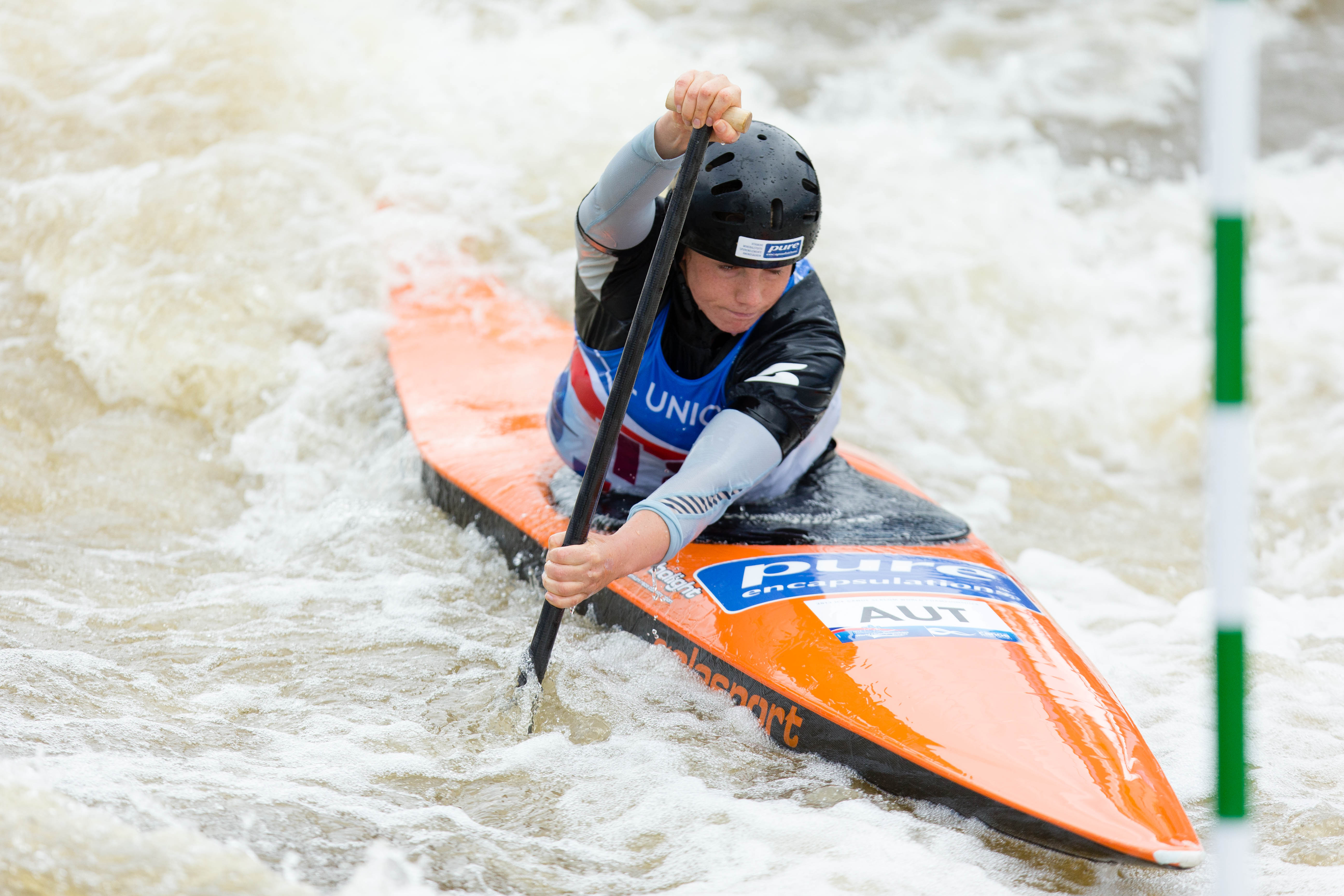

Julia Schmid (born 2 July 1988) is an Austrian slalom canoeist who has competed at the international level since 2004. Schmid has represented Hungary since 2019.

She won two bronze medals at the ICF Canoe Slalom World Championships, earning them in 2005 (K1 team) and 2015 (C1 team). She also won two silvers and a bronze at the European Championships.

Schmid was selected to represent Hungary in the Women's C1 Event at the 2020 Summer Olympics after Hungary earned the quota place on reallocation, which would've marked Hungary's Olympic canoe slalom debut. She withdrew on 19 July 2021 following the Hungarian Olympic Committee's decision to only send athletes vaccinated against COVID-19 to the Games.
