= Tomáš Koplík =

Czech slalom canoeist (born 1986)

Medal record

Men's canoe slalom

Representing Czech Republic

World Championships
Silver medal – second place	2010 Tacen	C2 team
Bronze medal – third place	2014 Deep Creek Lake	C2 team

European Championships
Gold medal – first place	2010 Bratislava	C2 team
Gold medal – first place	2011 La Seu d'Urgell	C2 team
Silver medal – second place	2015 Markkleeberg	C2 team
Silver medal – second place	2018 Prague	C2 team
Bronze medal – third place	2014 Vienna	C2 team
Bronze medal – third place	2017 Tacen	C2 team

U23 European Championships
Silver medal – second place	2005 Kraków	C2 team
Silver medal – second place	2007 Kraków	C2 team
Bronze medal – third place	2009 Liptovský Mikuláš	C2 team

Tomáš Koplík (born 21 July 1986) is a Czech slalom canoeist who has competed at the international level since 2004, together with his C2 partner Jakub Vrzáň.

He won two medals in the C2 team event at the ICF Canoe Slalom World Championships with a silver in 2010 and a bronze in 2014. He also won six medals in the same event at the European Championships (2 golds, 2 silvers and 2 bronzes).

== World Cup individual podiums ==
Season	Date	Venue	Position	Event
2011	14 Aug 2011	Prague	2nd	C2
