= Louise Donington =

British slalom canoeist

Medal record

Women's canoe slalom

Representing Great Britain

World Championships
Gold medal – first place	2009 La Seu d'Urgell	K1 team

European Championships
Gold medal – first place	2009 Nottingham	K1 team
Bronze medal – third place	2008 Kraków	K1 team

U23 European Championships
Silver medal – second place	2006 Nottingham	K1 team

Louise Donington (born 1984) is a British slalom canoeist who competed at the international level from 2001 to 2013.

She won a gold medal in the K1 team event at the 2009 ICF Canoe Slalom World Championships in La Seu d'Urgell. She also won a gold and a bronze in the same event at the European Championships.
