= Jaroslav Pospíšil (canoeist) =

Czech canoeist

Medal record

Men's canoe slalom

Representing Czech Republic

World Championships
Gold medal – first place	1995 Nottingham	C2 team
Gold medal – first place	1999 La Seu d'Urgell	C2 team
Gold medal – first place	2003 Augsburg	C2 team
Gold medal – first place	2006 Prague	C2 team
Gold medal – first place	2007 Foz do Iguaçu	C2 team

European Championships
Gold medal – first place	1998 Roudnice nad Labem	C2 team
Gold medal – first place	2009 Nottingham	C2 team
Silver medal – second place	2007 Liptovský Mikuláš	C2 team
Bronze medal – third place	2006 L'Argentière-la-Bessée	C2 team

Jaroslav Pospíšil (born 1973) is a former Czech slalom canoeist who competed from the mid-1990s to the early 2010s.

He won five gold medals in the C2 team event at the ICF Canoe Slalom World Championships (1995, 1999, 2003, 2006, 2007). He also won four medals in the same event at the European Championships (2 golds, 1 silver and 1 bronze).

His partner in the boat until 2006 was Jaroslav Pollert. From 2007 to 2009 it was David Mrůzek.

== World Cup individual podiums ==
Season	Date	Venue	Position	Event
1998	14 Jun 1998	Liptovský Mikuláš	3rd	C2
2001	27 May 2001	Goumois	2nd	C2
2001	10 Jun 2001	Tacen	2nd	C2
2001	5 Aug 2001	Prague	2nd	C2
2002	4 Aug 2002	Prague	2nd	C2
2003	13 Jul 2003	Tacen	3rd	C2
2003	31 Jul 2003	Bratislava	3rd	C2
2003	3 Aug 2003	Bratislava	3rd	C2
2004	25 Jul 2004	Bourg St.-Maurice	3rd	C2
