= Jan Benzien =

German canoeist

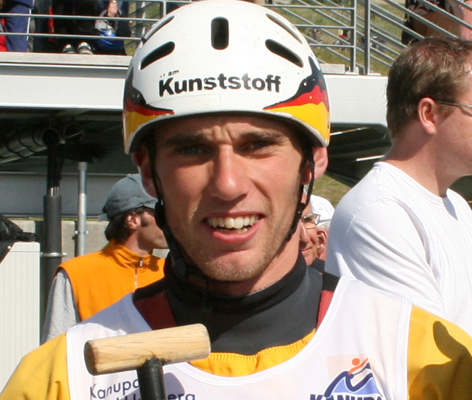
- Benzien in 2008

Personal information
- Born: 22 July 1982 (age 44) Giessen, West Germany
- Height: 180 cm (5 ft 11 in)
- Weight: 75 kg (165 lb)

Sport
- Sport: Canoe slalom
- Club: Leipziger Kanu Club
- Coached by: Michael Trummer (national); Frithjof Bergner (club)
Medal record
Representing Germany
World Championships
| Gold medal – first place | 2006 Prague | C1 team |
| Gold medal – first place | 2015 London | C2 |
| Silver medal – second place | 2002 B.St.-Maurice | C1 |
| Silver medal – second place | 2002 B.St.-Maurice | C1 team |
| Silver medal – second place | 2005 Penrith | C1 team |
| Silver medal – second place | 2007 Foz do Iguaçu | C1 team |
| Silver medal – second place | 2010 Tacen | C1 team |
| Silver medal – second place | 2011 Bratislava | C1 team |
| Silver medal – second place | 2013 Prague | C1 team |
| Silver medal – second place | 2015 London | C2 team |
| Bronze medal – third place | 2009 Seu d'Urgell | C1 |
European Championships
| Gold medal – first place | 2006 L'Argentière | C1 team |
| Gold medal – first place | 2013 Kraków | C1 |
| Gold medal – first place | 2018 Prague | C2 team |
| Silver medal – second place | 2002 Bratislava | C1 team |
| Silver medal – second place | 2005 Tacen | C1 team |
| Silver medal – second place | 2007 Liptovský | C1 team |
| Silver medal – second place | 2011 Seu d'Urgel | C1 team |
| Silver medal – second place | 2012 Augsburg | C1 team |
| Silver medal – second place | 2013 Kraków | C1 team |
| Silver medal – second place | 2015 Markkleeberg | C2 |
| Bronze medal – third place | 2002 Bratislava | C1 |
| Bronze medal – third place | 2009 Nottingham | C1 |
| Bronze medal – third place | 2009 Nottingham | C1 team |
| Bronze medal – third place | 2013 Kraków | C2 team |
| Bronze medal – third place | 2014 Vienna | C1 |
| Bronze medal – third place | 2016 Liptovský Mikuláš | C2 team |
U23 European Championships
| Gold medal – first place | 2004 Kraków | C1 |
| Gold medal – first place | 2004 Kraków | C1 team |
Junior World Championships
| Bronze medal – third place | 2000 Bratislava | C1 |
Junior European Championships
| Gold medal – first place | 1999 Solkan | C1 team |
| Bronze medal – third place | 1999 Solkan | C1 |

Jan Benzien (born 22 July 1982) is a German slalom canoeist who has competed at the international level since 1999. Benzien started out as a C1 paddler. Since 2012 he has also been competing in C2, teaming up with Franz Anton.

He won eleven medals at the ICF Canoe Slalom World Championships with two golds (C1 team: 2006, C2: 2015), eight silvers (C1: 2002; C1 team: 2002, 2005, 2007, 2010, 2011, 2013; C2 team: 2015), and a bronze (C1: 2009). He won additional 16 medals at the European Championships (3 golds, 7 silvers, and 6 bronzes).

Benzien competed at the 2008 Summer Olympics in Beijing. In the C1 event, he finished second in the qualification round, thus progressing to the semifinals. In the semifinals, Benzien finished twelfth, failing to reach the top eight and the final round. At the 2016 Summer Olympics, he placed fourth in the C2 event, together with teammate Franz Anton.

Benzien serves with the German Army and has a degree in sport management from the Vocational Academy of Riesa. He is active as an entrepreneur since 2014 and, together with a co-partner, he was constructing several buildings for gastronomy and boat rental at the Leipzig City Harbour, which he has leased from the city for this purpose. The city built the harbour facilities with access to the Elstermühlgraben. The ceremonial opening of the Leipzig City Harbour took place on 5 June 2026.

He is married to the Olympic canoeist Mandy Planert; they have children, Justus Jonas and Mika.

== World Cup individual podiums ==
| | 1st place, gold medalist(s) | 2nd place, silver medalist(s) | 3rd place, bronze medalist(s) | Total |
| C1 | 2 | 1 | 4 | 7 |
| C2 | 1 | 2 | 0 | 3 |
| Total | 3 | 3 | 4 | 10 |

| Season | Date | Venue | Position | Event |
|---|---|---|---|---|
| 2003 | 6 July 2003 | La Seu d'Urgell | 3rd | C1 |
| 2004 | 30 May 2004 | Merano | 3rd | C1 |
| 2005 | 17 July 2005 | Augsburg | 1st | C1 |
| 2006 | 28 May 2006 | Athens | 3rd | C1 |
| 2009 | 28 June 2009 | Pau | 1st | C1 |
| 2009 | 12 July 2009 | Augsburg | 3rd | C1 |
| 2011 | 9 July 2011 | Markkleeberg | 2nd | C1 |
| 2012 | 2 September 2012 | Bratislava | 1st | C2 |
| 2014 | 8 June 2014 | Lee Valley | 2nd | C2 |
| 2014 | 17 August 2014 | Augsburg | 2nd | C2 |
