= Alexandre Lauvergne =

French slalom canoeist

Medal record

Men's canoe slalom

Representing France

World Championships
Gold medal – first place	2002 Bourg St.-Maurice	C2 team

European Championships
Silver medal – second place	2002 Bratislava	C2 team
Bronze medal – third place	1998 Roudnice nad Labem	C2 team

Junior World Championships
Silver medal – second place	1990 Tavanasa	C2

Alexandre Lauvergne (born 1972) is a French slalom canoeist who competed at the international level from 1988 to 2002.

He won a gold medal in the C2 team event at the 2002 ICF Canoe Slalom World Championships in Bourg St.-Maurice. He also won a silver and a bronze in the same event at the European Championships.

His partner in the C2 boat throughout his active career was Nathanael Fouquet.

== World Cup individual podiums ==
Season	Date	Venue	Position	Event
1998	2 Aug 1998	Wausau	2nd	C2
