= Lukáš Přinda =

Czech slalom canoeist (born 1980)

Medal record

Men's canoe slalom

Representing Czech Republic

World Championships
Silver medal – second place	2010 Tacen	C2 team

European Championships
Gold medal – first place	2010 Bratislava	C2 team
Gold medal – first place	2011 La Seu d'Urgell	C2 team

Junior World Championships
Gold medal – first place	1998 Lofer	C1

Junior European Championships
Bronze medal – third place	1995 Liptovský Mikuláš	C2 team

Lukáš Přinda (born 1980) is a Czech slalom canoeist who competed at the international level from 1995 to 2012.

He won a silver medal in the C2 team event at the 2010 ICF Canoe Slalom World Championships in Tacen. He also won two gold medals in the same event at the European Championships.

His partner in the C2 boat from 2010 to 2012 was Jan Havlíček.
