= Daniele Molmenti =

Italian slalom canoeist (born 1984)

Personal information
- Full name: Daniele Cristoforo Molmenti
- Nickname: Cali
- Born: 1 August 1984 (age 42) Pordenone, Italy
- Height: 1.71 m (5 ft 7 in)
- Weight: 69 kg (152 lb)

Sport
- Country: Italy
- Sport: Canoe slalom
- Event: K1
- Club: G.S. Forestale

Achievements and titles
- Highest world ranking: No. 1 (2010-11, K1)
Medal record
Olympic Games
Gold medal – first place	2012 London	K1
World Championships
Gold medal – first place	2010 Tacen	K1
Gold medal – first place	2013 Prague	K1 team
Silver medal – second place	2005 Penrith	K1 team
Silver medal – second place	2006 Prague	K1 team
Bronze medal – third place	2010 Tacen	K1 team
Bronze medal – third place	2011 Bratislava	K1 team
European Championships
Gold medal – first place	2009 Nottingham	K1
Gold medal – first place	2011 La Seu d'Urgell	K1
Gold medal – first place	2012 Augsburg	K1
Silver medal – second place	2008 Kraków	K1
Silver medal – second place	2008 Kraków	K1 team
Bronze medal – third place	2004 Skopje	K1
Bronze medal – third place	2005 Tacen	K1 team
Bronze medal – third place	2015 Markkleeberg	K1 team
U23 European Championships
Gold medal – first place	2005 Kraków	K1
Silver medal – second place	2005 Kraków	K1 team
Silver medal – second place	2007 Kraków	K1 team
Bronze medal – third place	2006 Nottingham	K1
Bronze medal – third place	2006 Nottingham	K1 team
Junior World Championships
Bronze medal – third place	2002 Nowy Sącz	K1
Junior European Championships
Gold medal – first place	2001 Bratislava	K1

Daniele Cristoforo Molmenti (born 1 August 1984 in Pordenone) is an Italian slalom canoeist who competed at the international level from 1999 to 2016.

== Career ==
On 1 August 2012, his 28th birthday, he won the gold medal in the K1 event at the 2012 Summer Olympics in London. Molmenti also finished tenth in the K1 event at the 2008 Summer Olympics in Beijing.

Molmenti won six medals at the ICF Canoe Slalom World Championships with two golds (K1: 2010, K1 team: 2013), two silvers (K1 team: 2005, 2006), and two bronzes (K1 team: 2010, 2011).

Molmenti is also the European Champion from 2009, 2011 and 2012. He also has 2 silver and 3 bronze medals from the European Championships. In 2010 he won the overall World Cup title in K1. Molmenti finished the 2010 and 2011 seasons as the World No. 1 in the K1 event.

He announced his retirement from the sport in 2017, when he became the technical director of the Italian national team.

== World Cup individual podiums ==
	1st place, gold medalist(s)	2nd place, silver medalist(s)	3rd place, bronze medalist(s)	Total
K1	7	5	1	13

Season	Date	Venue	Position	Event
2004	30 May 2004	Merano	1st	K1
2005	10 July 2005	Athens	2nd	K1
2005	24 July 2005	La Seu d'Urgell	1st	K1
2006	28 May 2006	Athens	1st	K1
2009	1 February 2009	Mangahao	2nd	K1^{1}
2009	5 July 2009	Bratislava	2nd	K1
2009	11 July 2009	Augsburg	3rd	K1
2009	3 August 2009	Kananaskis	1st	K1^{2}
2010	21 February 2010	Penrith	1st	K1^{3}
2010	20 June 2010	Prague	1st	K1
2010	27 June 2010	La Seu d'Urgell	1st	K1
2011	13 August 2011	Prague	2nd	K1
2016	4 June 2016	Ivrea	2nd	K1

^{1} Oceania Championship counting for World Cup points
^{2} Pan American Championship counting for World Cup points
^{3} Oceania Canoe Slalom Open counting for World Cup points

== Other activities ==
In 2016, he was one of the Italian celebrities lending their support to the Green Cross campaign for World Water Day.
