= Jan Havlíček =

Czech slalom canoeist

Medal record

Men's slalom canoeing

Representing Czech Republic

World Championships
Silver medal – second place	2010 Tacen	C-2 team

European Championships
Gold medal – first place	2010 Bratislava	C-2 team
Gold medal – first place	2011 La Seu d'Urgell	C-2 team

Jan Havlíček is a Czech slalom canoeist who has competed since the mid-2000s. Since 2010 he has been competing in C-2 together with Lukáš Přinda.

He won a silver medal in the C-2 team event at the 2010 ICF Canoe Slalom World Championships in Tacen. He also won two gold medals in the same event at the European Championships.
