= Diego Paolini =

Italian canoeist

Medal record

Men's canoe slalom

Representing Italy

World Championships
Silver medal – second place	2006 Prague	K1 team
Bronze medal – third place	2010 Tacen	K1 team

European Championships
Silver medal – second place	2008 Kraków	K1 team
Bronze medal – third place	2006 L'Argentière	K1

U23 European Championships
Silver medal – second place	2005 Kraków	K1 team

Diego Paolini is an Italian slalom canoeist who competed at the international level from 1999 to 2013.

He won two medals in the K1 team event at the ICF Canoe Slalom World Championships with a silver in 2006 and a bronze in 2010. He also won a silver and a bronze medal at the European Championships.

== World Cup individual podiums ==
Season	Date	Venue	Position	Event
2006	2 Jul 2006	L'Argentière-la-Bessée	3rd	K1^{1}

^{1} European Championship counting for World Cup points

== Bibliography ==
- - accessed 12 September 2010.
