= 2015 European Canoe Slalom Championships =

The 2015 European Canoe Slalom Championships took place in Markkleeberg, Germany under the auspices of the European Canoe Association (ECA). It was the 16th edition of the competition and took place at the Kanupark Markkleeberg artificial course from 28th-31 May 2015.

== Medal summary ==
=== Men's results ===
==== Canoe ====
Event	Gold	Points	Silver	Points	Bronze	Points
C1	Benjamin Savšek (SLO)	97.70	Sideris Tasiadis (GER)	98.15	Matej Beňuš (SVK)	100.18
C1 team	Slovakia; Michal Martikán; Alexander Slafkovský; Matej Beňuš	115.03	Czech Republic; Michal Jáně; Stanislav Ježek; Tomáš Rak	117.70	Great Britain; David Florence; Ryan Westley; Adam Burgess	119.24
C2	Germany; Robert Behling; Thomas Becker	104.46	Germany; Franz Anton; Jan Benzien	104.72	Great Britain; David Florence; Richard Hounslow	106.06
C2 team	Slovakia; Pavol Hochschorner & Peter Hochschorner; Ladislav Škantár & Peter Škantár; Tomáš Kučera & Ján Bátik	131.24	Czech Republic; Ondřej Karlovský & Jakub Jáně; Jonáš Kašpar & Marek Šindler; Tomáš Koplík & Jakub Vrzáň	131.93	Russia; Dmitry Larionov & Mikhail Kuznetsov; Maxim Obraztsov & Alexei Suslov; Alexander Ovchinikov & Aleksei Popov	140.46

==== Kayak ====
Event	Gold	Points	Silver	Points	Bronze	Points
K1	Boris Neveu (FRA)	90.80	Alexander Grimm (GER)	92.07	Andrej Málek (SVK)	94.02
K1 team	Germany; Sebastian Schubert; Hannes Aigner; Alexander Grimm	105.76	Great Britain; Richard Hounslow; Joe Clarke; Bradley Forbes-Cryans	108.01	Italy; Daniele Molmenti; Andrea Romeo; Giovanni De Gennaro	109.81

=== Women's results ===
==== Canoe ====
Event	Gold	Points	Silver	Points	Bronze	Points
C1	Kimberley Woods (GBR)	123.13	Mallory Franklin (GBR)	125.85	Núria Vilarrubla (ESP)	127.89
C1 team	Spain; Núria Vilarrubla; Klara Olazabal; Annebel van der Knijff	158.72	Czech Republic; Kateřina Hošková; Monika Jančová; Tereza Fišerová	160.41	Great Britain; Kimberley Woods; Mallory Franklin; Eilidh Gibson	161.19

==== Kayak ====
Event	Gold	Points	Silver	Points	Bronze	Points
K1	Maialen Chourraut (ESP)	108.09	Ricarda Funk (GER)	108.52	Kateřina Kudějová (CZE)	109.30
K1 team	Slovakia; Jana Dukátová; Kristína Nevařilová; Kristína Zárubová	133.95	Poland; Natalia Pacierpnik; Klaudia Zwolińska; Sara Ćwik	136.50	France; Carole Bouzidi; Marie-Zélia Lafont; Émilie Fer	141.90

== Medal table ==
Rank	Nation	Gold	Silver	Bronze	Total
1	Slovakia (SVK)	3	0	2	5
2	Germany (GER)	2	4	0	6
3	Spain (ESP)	2	0	1	3
4	Great Britain (GBR)	1	2	3	6
5	France (FRA)	1	0	1	2
6	Slovenia (SLO)	1	0	0	1
7	Czech Republic (CZE)	0	3	1	4
8	Poland (POL)	0	1	0	1
9	Italy (ITA)	0	0	1	1
9	Russia (RUS)	0	0	1	1
Totals (10 entries)		10	10	10	30
