= 2009 European Canoe Slalom Championships =

The 2009 European Canoe Slalom Championships took place at the Holme Pierrepont National Watersports Centre in Nottingham, United Kingdom between May 28 and 31, 2009 under the auspices of the European Canoe Association (ECA). It was the 10th edition.

== Medal summary ==
=== Men's results ===
==== Canoe ====
Event	Gold	Points	Silver	Points	Bronze	Points
C1	Michal Martikán (SVK)	95.66	Alexander Slafkovský (SVK)	96.26	Jan Benzien (GER)	97.51
C1 team	Czech Republic; Stanislav Ježek; Tomáš Indruch; Jan Mašek	98.11	France; Tony Estanguet; Denis Gargaud Chanut; Nicolas Peschier	98.52	Germany; Sideris Tasiadis; Jan Benzien; Nico Bettge	99.10
C2	Slovakia; Pavol Hochschorner; Peter Hochschorner	101.20	France; Damien Troquenet; Mathieu Voyemant	103.52	Great Britain; Tim Baillie; Etienne Stott	104.37
C2 team	Czech Republic; Jaroslav Volf & Ondřej Štěpánek; Marek Jiras & Tomáš Máder; Jaroslav Pospíšil & David Mrůzek	111.22	Great Britain; Tim Baillie & Etienne Stott; David Florence & Richard Hounslow; Daniel Goddard & Colin Radmore	112.17	Poland; Marcin Pochwała & Piotr Szczepański; Patryk Brzeziński & Dariusz Chlebek; Grzegorz Wójs & Paweł Sarna	118.30

==== Kayak ====
Event	Gold	Points	Silver	Points	Bronze	Points
K1	Daniele Molmenti (ITA)	92.49	Boris Neveu (FRA)	92.93	Julien Billaut (FRA)	93.43
K1 team	Great Britain; Campbell Walsh; Richard Hounslow; Huw Swetnam	94.62	Germany; Alexander Grimm; Tim Maxeiner; Sebastian Schubert	94.70	France; Fabien Lefèvre; Boris Neveu; Julien Billaut	94.80

=== Women's results ===
==== Kayak ====
Event	Gold	Points	Silver	Points	Bronze	Points
K1	Elena Kaliská (SVK)	104.24	Émilie Fer (FRA)	105.60	Mathilde Pichery (FRA)	107.56
K1 team	Great Britain; Lizzie Neave; Louise Donington; Laura Blakeman	108.63	Slovakia; Elena Kaliská; Jana Dukátová; Gabriela Stacherová	110.46	Germany; Jennifer Bongardt; Melanie Pfeifer; Jasmin Schornberg	113.43

== Medal table ==
Rank	Nation	Gold	Silver	Bronze	Total
1	Slovakia (SVK)	3	2	0	5
2	Great Britain (GBR)	2	1	1	4
3	Czech Republic (CZE)	2	0	0	2
4	Italy (ITA)	1	0	0	1
5	France (FRA)	0	4	3	7
6	Germany (GER)	0	1	3	4
7	Poland (POL)	0	0	1	1
Totals (7 entries)		8	8	8	24
