= Laura Blakeman =

British slalom canoeist

Medal record

Women's canoe slalom

Representing Great Britain

World Championships
| Gold medal – first place | 2009 La Seu d'Urgell | K1 team |
| Silver medal – second place | 2005 Penrith | K1 team |
| Bronze medal – third place | 2002 Bourg St.-Maurice | K1 team |
| Bronze medal – third place | 2003 Augsburg | K1 team |
| Bronze medal – third place | 2007 Foz do Igauçu | K1 team |

European Championships
| Gold medal – first place | 2009 Nottingham | K1 team |
| Silver medal – second place | 1998 Roudnice nad Labem | K1 team |
| Bronze medal – third place | 2007 Liptovský Mikuláš | K1 team |
| Bronze medal – third place | 2008 Kraków | K1 team |

U23 European Championships
| Silver medal – second place | 2002 Bratislava | K1 |

Junior European Championships
| Gold medal – first place | 1997 Nowy Sącz | K1 |

Laura Kate Blakeman (born 25 April 1979 in Stoke-on-Trent) is a British slalom canoeist who competed at the international level from 1995 to 2011.

She won five medals in the K1 team event at the ICF Canoe Slalom World Championships with a gold (2009), a silver (2005) and three bronzes (2002, 2003, 2007). She won another four medals in the same event at the European Championships (1 gold, 1 silver and 2 bronzes).

Blakeman finished 12th in the K1 event at the 2000 Summer Olympics in Sydney.
