= 2010 European Canoe Slalom Championships =

The 2010 European Canoe Slalom Championships took place in Bratislava, Slovakia between August 13 and 15, 2010 under the auspices of the European Canoe Association (ECA). It was the 11th edition. The Championships were originally scheduled to take place in early June, but the high water level of the Danube River, which feeds the Čunovo Water Sports Centre, forced the organizers to cancel the event after some heat runs. It was later rescheduled for mid-August.

== Medal summary ==
=== Men's results ===
==== Canoe ====
Event	Gold	Points	Silver	Points	Bronze	Points
C1	Michal Martikán (SVK)	90.06	Matej Beňuš (SVK)	92.10	Alexander Slafkovský (SVK)	93.89
C1 team	Slovakia; Michal Martikán; Alexander Slafkovský; Matej Beňuš	112.73	Czech Republic; Jan Mašek; Michal Jáně; Stanislav Ježek	116.94	France; Tony Estanguet; Denis Gargaud Chanut; Nicolas Peschier	119.63
C2	Slovakia; Ladislav Škantár; Peter Škantár	101.21	Czech Republic; Jaroslav Volf; Ondřej Štěpánek	102.38	Great Britain; David Florence; Richard Hounslow	103.38
C2 team	Czech Republic; Tomáš Koplík & Jakub Vrzáň; Lukáš Přinda & Jan Havlíček; Jaroslav Volf & Ondřej Štěpánek	124.67	Poland; Paweł Sarna & Dawid Dobrowolski; Patryk Brzeziński & Dariusz Chlebek; Marcin Pochwała & Piotr Szczepański	128.34	Great Britain; Tim Baillie & Etienne Stott; David Florence & Richard Hounslow; Daniel Goddard & Colin Radmore	133.13

==== Kayak ====
Event	Gold	Points	Silver	Points	Bronze	Points
K1	Peter Kauzer (SLO)	87.82	Jure Meglič (SLO)	87.97	Vavřinec Hradilek (CZE)	89.85
K1 team	Poland; Dariusz Popiela; Mateusz Polaczyk; Grzegorz Polaczyk	108.49	Germany; Hannes Aigner; Alexander Grimm; Sebastian Schubert	108.98	Slovenia; Peter Kauzer; Dejan Kralj; Jure Meglič	110.86

=== Women's results ===
==== Canoe ====
Event	Gold	Points	Silver	Points	Bronze	Points
C1	Katarína Macová (SVK)	160.13	Jana Dukátová (SVK)	170.05	Caroline Loir (FRA)	183.29

==== Kayak ====
Event	Gold	Points	Silver	Points	Bronze	Points
K1	Jana Dukátová (SVK)	97.59	Corinna Kuhnle (AUT)	101.68	Urša Kragelj (SLO)	101.99
K1 team	Germany; Melanie Pfeifer; Jasmin Schornberg; Jennifer Bongardt	136.20	Poland; Joanna Mędoń; Małgorzata Milczarek; Natalia Pacierpnik	137.38	Slovakia; Jana Dukátová; Dana Beňušová; Gabriela Stacherová	140.02

== Medal table ==
Rank	Nation	Gold	Silver	Bronze	Total
1	Slovakia (SVK)	5	2	2	9
2	Czech Republic (CZE)	1	2	1	4
3	Poland (POL)	1	2	0	3
4	Slovenia (SLO)	1	1	2	4
5	Germany (GER)	1	1	0	2
6	Austria (AUT)	0	1	0	1
7	France (FRA)	0	0	2	2
7	Great Britain (GBR)	0	0	2	2
Totals (8 entries)		9	9	9	27
