= 2008 European Canoe Slalom Championships =

The 2008 European Canoe Slalom Championships took place at the Kraków-Kolna Canoe Slalom Course in Kraków, Poland between May 8 and 11, 2008 under the auspices of the European Canoe Association (ECA). It was the 9th edition. These championships also served as the Olympic qualification for the 2008 Summer Olympics.

== Medal summary ==
=== Men's results ===
==== Canoe ====
Event	Gold	Points	Silver	Points	Bronze	Points
C1	Michal Martikán (SVK)	186.91	Stanislav Ježek (CZE)	187.89	Alexander Slafkovský (SVK)	189.73
C1 team	Slovakia; Michal Martikán; Alexander Slafkovský; Matej Beňuš	214.81	Poland; Krzysztof Bieryt; Grzegorz Kiljanek; Dawid Bartos	218.56	Germany; Christian Bahmann; Nico Bettge; Lukas Hoffmann	222.78
C2	Slovakia; Pavol Hochschorner; Peter Hochschorner	198.76	Slovakia; Ladislav Škantár; Peter Škantár	207.00	Italy; Andrea Benetti; Erik Masoero	207.23
C2 team	Germany; Marcus Becker & Stefan Henze; Kay Simon & Robby Simon; David Schröder & Frank Henze	251.09	Poland; Marcin Pochwała & Paweł Sarna; Dominik Węglarz & Dawid Dobrowolski; Dariusz Wrzosek & Jarosław Miczek	254.95	Slovakia; Pavol Hochschorner & Peter Hochschorner; Ladislav Škantár & Peter Škantár; Tomáš Kučera & Ján Bátik	257.75

==== Kayak ====
Event	Gold	Points	Silver	Points	Bronze	Points
K1	Campbell Walsh (GBR)	181.63	Daniele Molmenti (ITA)	181.76	Fabian Dörfler (GER)	182.41
K1 team	Poland; Dariusz Popiela; Grzegorz Polaczyk; Mateusz Polaczyk	204.76	Italy; Diego Paolini; Daniele Molmenti; Luca Costa	207.28	Switzerland; Michael Kurt; Mathias Röthenmund; Moritz Lüscher	209.11

=== Women's results ===
==== Kayak ====
Event	Gold	Points	Silver	Points	Bronze	Points
K1	Štěpánka Hilgertová (CZE)	200.89	Marie Řihošková (CZE)	201.50	Irena Pavelková (CZE)	203.97
K1 team	Germany; Claudia Bär; Mandy Planert; Jasmin Schornberg	230.62	Slovakia; Jana Dukátová; Elena Kaliská; Gabriela Stacherová	236.59	United Kingdom; Fiona Pennie; Louise Donington; Laura Blakeman	253.44

== Medal table ==
Rank	Nation	Gold	Silver	Bronze	Total
1	Slovakia (SVK)	3	2	2	7
2	Germany (GER)	2	0	2	4
3	Czech Republic (CZE)	1	2	1	4
4	Poland (POL)	1	2	0	3
5	Great Britain (GBR)	1	0	1	2
6	Italy (ITA)	0	2	1	3
7	Switzerland (SUI)	0	0	1	1
Totals (7 entries)		8	8	8	24
