= Huw Swetnam =

British slalom canoeist

Medal record

Men's canoe slalom

Representing Great Britain

World Championships
Silver medal – second place	2009 La Seu d'Urgell	K-1 team

European Championships
Gold medal – first place	2009 Nottingham	K-1 team
Silver medal – second place	2004 Skopje	K-1 team
Bronze medal – third place	2007 Liptovský Mikuláš	K-1 team

Huw Swetnam is a British slalom canoeist who has competed since the mid-2000s. He won a silver medal in the K-1 team event at the 2009 ICF Canoe Slalom World Championships in La Seu d'Urgell. He also won three medals in the same event at the European Championships (1 gold, 1 silver and 1 bronze).

He was born in Bramcote. He attended Bramcote hills Primary school and later the comprehensive.
