= Andreas Langer =

German Nordic combined skier

Personal information
- Nationality: German
- Born: 13 October 1956 (age 68); Mildenau, East Germany

Sport
- Sport: Nordic combined

Andreas Langer (born 13 October 1956) is a German former skier. He competed in the Nordic combined event at the 1984 Winter Olympics.
