= Richard Hounslow =

British slalom canoeist (born 1981)

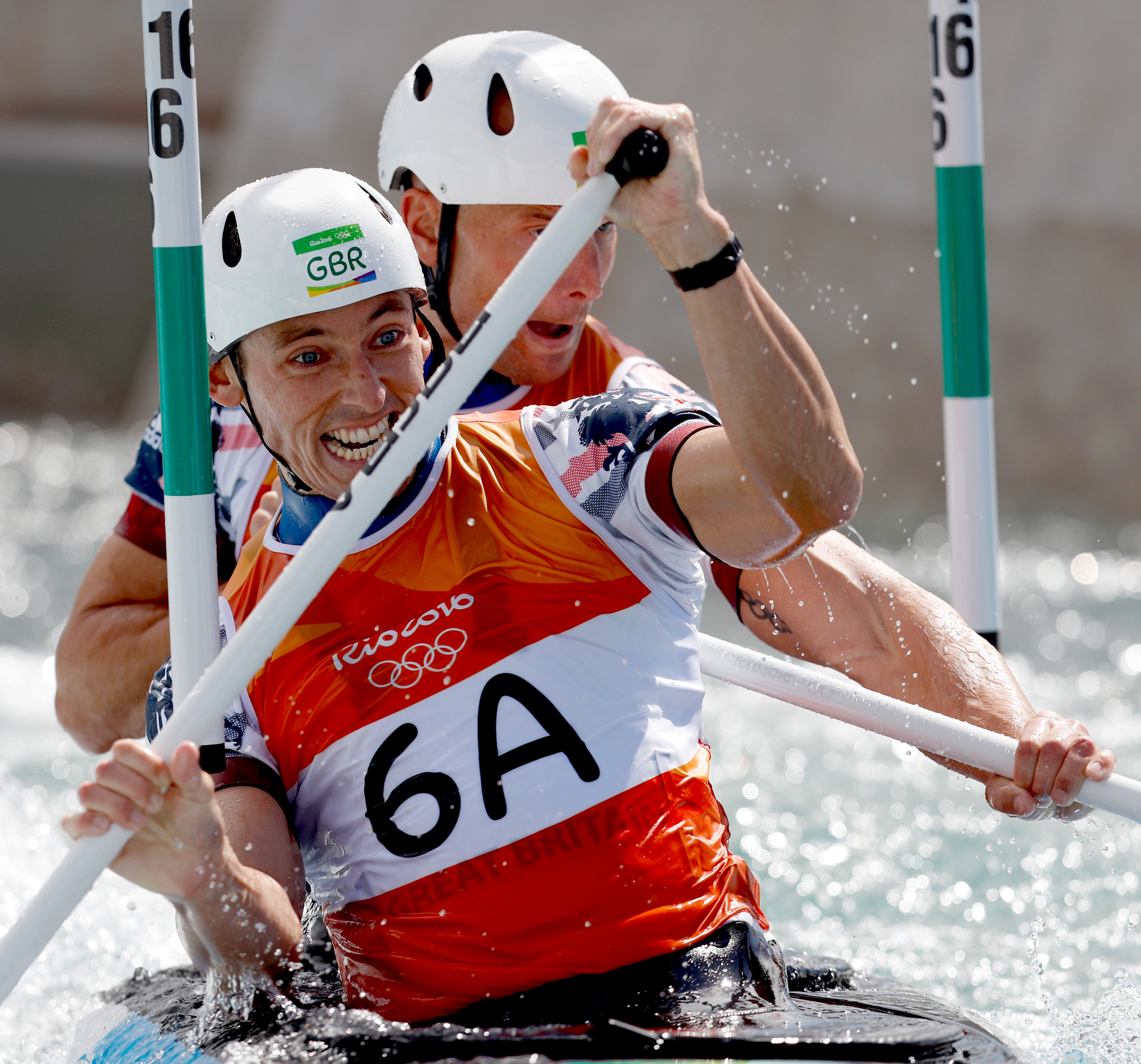
- Florence and Hounslow (right) at the 2016 Summer Olympics

Personal information
- Born: 19 December 1981 (age 44) Harrow, London, United Kingdom
- Height: 183 cm (6 ft 0 in)
- Weight: 76 kg (168 lb)

Sport
- Sport: Canoe slalom
- Club: Peak UK
Medal record
Representing Great Britain
Olympic Games
Silver medal – second place	2012 London	C2
Silver medal – second place	2016 Rio de Janeiro	C2
World Championships
Gold medal – first place	2013 Prague	C2
Silver medal – second place	2009 La Seu d'Urgell	K1 team
Bronze medal – third place	2009 La Seu d'Urgell	C2 team
Bronze medal – third place	2010 Tacen	C2
Bronze medal – third place	2011 Bratislava	C2 team
Bronze medal – third place	2013 Prague	C2 team
Bronze medal – third place	2014 Deep Creek Lake	K1 team
Bronze medal – third place	2015 London	C2 team
Bronze medal – third place	2015 London	K1 team
European Championships
Gold medal – first place	2009 Nottingham	K1 team
Gold medal – first place	2012 Augsburg	C2 team
Silver medal – second place	2009 Nottingham	C2 team
Silver medal – second place	2014 Vienna	K1 team
Silver medal – second place	2015 Markkleeberg	K1 team
Bronze medal – third place	2007 Liptovský Mikuláš	K1 team
Bronze medal – third place	2010 Bratislava	C2
Bronze medal – third place	2010 Bratislava	C2 team
Bronze medal – third place	2015 Markkleeberg	C2
Junior European Championships
Bronze medal – third place	1999 Solkan	K1 team

Richard John Hounslow (born 19 December 1981) is a British slalom canoeist who competed at the international level from 1999 until his retirement in 2016. He started out as a specialist in the kayak (K1) category, but in 2009 he also started competing in canoe doubles (C2) alongside David Florence. In his last season (2016) he concentrated on the C2 class exclusively.

== Personal and early life ==
Hounslow was born in the London Borough of Harrow, which he represented in the London Youth Games. He attended Harrow College. He was inducted into the London Youth Games Hall of Fame in 2012. Outside of canoeing, Hounslow is a Tottenham Hotspur supporter.

== Career ==
At the 2012 Summer Olympics in London he won a silver medal in the C2 event and placed 12th in the K1 event. He won another silver medal in the C2 event at the 2016 Summer Olympics in Rio de Janeiro.

Hounslow won nine medals at the ICF Canoe Slalom World Championships with a gold (C2: 2013), a silver (K1 team: 2009) and seven bronzes (C2: 2010; C2 team: 2009, 2011, 2013, 2015; K1 team: 2014, 2015). He also won 9 medals at the European Championships (2 golds, 3 silvers and 4 bronzes).

In 2012, Hounslow won the C2 gold at the World Cup race in Cardiff along with David Florence.

== World Cup individual podiums ==
Season	Date	Venue	Position	Event
2008	29 Jun 2008	Tacen	3rd	K1
2009	28 Jun 2009	Pau	3rd	C2
2011	14 Aug 2011	Prague	3rd	C2
2012	10 Jun 2012	Cardiff	1st	C2
2013	23 Jun 2013	Cardiff	2nd	C2
2014	17 Aug 2014	Augsburg	3rd	C2
2015	9 Aug 2015	La Seu d'Urgell	3rd	C2
