= 2007 ICF Canoe Slalom World Championships =

Canoe slalom event in Foz do Iguaçu, Brazil

The 2007 ICF Canoe Slalom World Championships were held in Foz do Iguaçu, Brazil under the auspices of International Canoe Federation. It was the 31st edition.

== Medal summary ==
=== Men's ===
==== Canoe ====
Event	Gold	Points	Silver	Points	Bronze	Points
C1	Michal Martikán (SVK)	192.87	Tony Estanguet (FRA)	194.23	Robin Bell (AUS)	195.70
C1 team	France; Tony Estanguet; Pierre Labarelle; Nicolas Peschier	212.16	Germany; Jan Benzien; Nico Bettge; Lukas Hoffmann	214.40	Czech Republic; Stanislav Ježek; Tomáš Indruch; Jan Mašek	217.87
C2	Slovakia; Pavol Hochschorner; Peter Hochschorner	206.81	France; Pierre Luquet; Christophe Luquet	214.83	Italy; Andrea Benetti; Erik Masoero	215.34
C2 team	Czech Republic; Jaroslav Volf & Ondřej Štěpánek; Marek Jiras & Tomáš Máder; Jaroslav Pospíšil & David Mrůzek	235.48	France; Cédric Forgit & Martin Braud; Pierre Luquet & Christophe Luquet; Damien Troquenet & Mathieu Voyemant	237.22	Slovakia; Pavol Hochschorner & Peter Hochschorner; Ladislav Škantár & Peter Škantár; Tomáš Kučera & Ján Bátik	239.37

==== Kayak ====
Event	Gold	Points	Silver	Points	Bronze	Points
K1	Sébastien Combot (FRA)	186.25	Fabian Dörfler (GER)	187.90	Campbell Walsh (GBR)	189.34
K1 team	Germany; Fabian Dörfler; Alexander Grimm; Erik Pfannmöller	204.96	France; Julien Billaut; Pierre Bourliaud; Sébastien Combot	205.28	Czech Republic; Ivan Pišvejc; Vavřinec Hradilek; Luboš Hilgert	205.91

=== Women's ===
==== Kayak ====
Event	Gold	Points	Silver	Points	Bronze	Points
K1	Jennifer Bongardt (GER)	210.05	Elena Kaliská (SVK)	210.99	Štěpánka Hilgertová (CZE)	211.55
K1 team	Germany; Jennifer Bongardt; Mandy Planert; Jasmin Schornberg	238.76	Czech Republic; Štěpánka Hilgertová; Irena Pavelková; Marcela Sadilová	240.49	Great Britain; Fiona Pennie; Laura Blakeman; Lizzie Neave	241.42

== Medal table ==
Rank	Nation	Gold	Silver	Bronze	Total
1	Germany (GER)	3	2	0	5
2	France (FRA)	2	4	0	6
3	Slovakia (SVK)	2	1	1	4
4	Czech Republic (CZE)	1	1	3	5
5	Great Britain (GBR)	0	0	2	2
6	Australia (AUS)	0	0	1	1
6	Italy (ITA)	0	0	1	1
Totals (7 entries)		8	8	8	24
