= 2014 European Canoe Slalom Championships =

The 2014 European Canoe Slalom Championships took place in Vienna, Austria between May 29 and June 1, 2014 under the auspices of the European Canoe Association (ECA). It was the 15th edition of the competition.

The competitions were held on the first Austrian artificial slalom course opened in August 2013.

The women's C1 team event did not count as a medal event due to insufficient number of participating countries. An event must have at least 5 nations taking part in order to count as a medal event.

== Medal summary ==
=== Men's results ===
==== Canoe ====
Event	Gold	Points	Silver	Points	Bronze	Points
C1	Alexander Slafkovský (SVK)	88.49	Michal Martikán (SVK)	89.76	Jan Benzien (GER)	90.05
C1 team	Slovenia; Benjamin Savšek; Anže Berčič; Luka Božič	98.48	Czech Republic; Lukáš Rohan; Vítězslav Gebas; Jan Mašek	101.18	Slovakia; Michal Martikán; Alexander Slafkovský; Karol Rozmuš	102.16
C2	Slovakia; Ladislav Škantár; Peter Škantár	95.20	Poland; Piotr Szczepański; Marcin Pochwała	95.41	Slovenia; Luka Božič; Sašo Taljat	96.93
C2 team	Slovakia; Pavol Hochschorner & Peter Hochschorner; Ladislav Škantár & Peter Škantár; Tomáš Kučera & Ján Bátik	112.39	France; Nicolas Peschier & Pierre Labarelle; Gauthier Klauss & Matthieu Péché; Pierre Picco & Hugo Biso	112.85	Czech Republic; Ondřej Karlovský & Jakub Jáně; Tomáš Koplík & Jakub Vrzáň; Jonáš Kašpar & Marek Šindler	115.08

==== Kayak ====
Event	Gold	Points	Silver	Points	Bronze	Points
K1	Jiří Prskavec (CZE)	83.94	Vít Přindiš (CZE)	84.82	Samuel Hernanz (ESP)	86.32
K1 team	Germany; Sebastian Schubert; Fabian Dörfler; Alexander Grimm	96.27	Great Britain; Richard Hounslow; Joe Clarke; Thomas Brady	98.75	Poland; Mateusz Polaczyk; Rafał Polaczyk; Dariusz Popiela	98.90

=== Women's results ===
==== Canoe ====
Event	Gold	Points	Silver	Points	Bronze	Points
C1	Caroline Loir (FRA)	105.21	Julia Schmid (AUT)	106.32	Kateřina Hošková (CZE)	107.05
C1 team (non-medal event)	Great Britain; Mallory Franklin; Jasmine Royle; Eilidh Gibson	140.28	Spain; Núria Vilarrubla; Miren Lazkano; Klara Olazabal	149.56	Czech Republic; Kateřina Hošková; Monika Jančová; Jana Matulková	161.67

==== Kayak ====
Event	Gold	Points	Silver	Points	Bronze	Points
K1	Ricarda Funk (GER)	96.11	Melanie Pfeifer (GER)	96.37	Émilie Fer (FRA)	96.65
K1 team	Czech Republic; Štěpánka Hilgertová; Kateřina Kudějová; Veronika Vojtová	108.65	Spain; Maialen Chourraut; Irati Goikoetxea; Marta Martínez	110.17	France; Carole Bouzidi; Nouria Newman; Émilie Fer	110.36

== Medal table ==
Rank	Nation	Gold	Silver	Bronze	Total
1	Slovakia (SVK)	3	1	1	5
2	Czech Republic (CZE)	2	2	2	6
3	Germany (GER)	2	1	1	4
4	France (FRA)	1	1	2	4
5	Slovenia (SLO)	1	0	1	2
6	Poland (POL)	0	1	1	2
6	Spain (ESP)	0	1	1	2
8	Austria (AUT)	0	1	0	1
8	Great Britain (GBR)	0	1	0	1
Totals (9 entries)		9	9	9	27
