= David Mrůzek =

Czech slalom canoeist

Medal record

Men's canoe slalom

Representing Czech Republic

World Championships
Gold medal – first place	2007 Foz do Iguaçu	C-2 team

European Championships
Gold medal – first place	2009 Nottingham	C-2 team
Silver medal – second place	2007 Liptovský Mikuláš	C-2 team

David Mrůzek (born 1976) is a Czech slalom canoeist who competed in the 1990s and 2000s.

He won a gold medal in the C-2 team event at the 2007 ICF Canoe Slalom World Championships in Foz do Iguaçu. He also won a gold and a silver in the same event at the European Championships.
