= 2006 European Canoe Slalom Championships =

The 2006 European Canoe Slalom Championships took place in L'Argentière-la-Bessée, France between June 30 and July 2, 2006 under the auspices of the European Canoe Association (ECA). It was the 7th edition.

== Medal summary ==
=== Men's results ===
==== Canoe ====
Event	Gold	Points	Silver	Points	Bronze	Points
C1	Tony Estanguet (FRA)	221.24	Michal Martikán (SVK)	224.82	Tomáš Indruch (CZE)	225.96
C1 team	Germany; Stefan Pfannmöller; Nico Bettge; Jan Benzien	252.06	Slovakia; Michal Martikán; Juraj Minčík; Alexander Slafkovský	256.09	Czech Republic; Tomáš Indruch; Jan Mašek; Stanislav Ježek	257.23
C2	France; Martin Braud; Cédric Forgit	237.51	Slovakia; Pavol Hochschorner; Peter Hochschorner	237.91	Germany; Kay Simon; Robby Simon	238.73
C2 team	Germany; Felix Michel & Sebastian Piersig; David Schröder & Frank Henze; Kay Simon & Robby Simon	265.50	France; Philippe Quémerais & Yann Le Pennec; Martin Braud & Cédric Forgit; Christophe Luquet & Pierre Luquet	269.69	Czech Republic; Marek Jiras & Tomáš Máder; Jaroslav Volf & Ondřej Štěpánek; Jaroslav Pospíšil & Jaroslav Pollert	271.50

==== Kayak ====
Event	Gold	Points	Silver	Points	Bronze	Points
K1	Fabian Dörfler (GER)	211.61	Erik Pfannmöller (GER)	212.09	Diego Paolini (ITA)	212.73
K1 team	Slovenia; Peter Kauzer; Dejan Kralj; Jure Meglič	241.14	Poland; Grzegorz Polaczyk; Henryk Polaczyk; Dariusz Popiela	242.41	Germany; Fabian Dörfler; Alexander Grimm; Erik Pfannmöller	242.85

=== Women's results ===
==== Kayak ====
Event	Gold	Points	Silver	Points	Bronze	Points
K1	Elena Kaliská (SVK)	237.11	Jennifer Bongardt (GER)	238.34	Mathilde Pichery (FRA)	238.86
K1 team	Slovakia; Elena Kaliská; Jana Dukátová; Gabriela Stacherová	277.24	Czech Republic; Štěpánka Hilgertová; Irena Pavelková; Marie Řihošková	281.31	France; Mathilde Pichery; Aline Tornare; Marie Gaspard	283.26

== Medal table ==
Rank	Nation	Gold	Silver	Bronze	Total
1	Germany (GER)	3	2	2	7
2	Slovakia (SVK)	2	3	0	5
3	France (FRA)	2	1	2	5
4	Slovenia (SLO)	1	0	0	1
5	Czech Republic (CZE)	0	1	3	4
6	Poland (POL)	0	1	0	1
7	Italy (ITA)	0	0	1	1
Totals (7 entries)		8	8	8	24
