= 2006 ICF Canoe Slalom World Championships =

Canoe slalom event in Prague, Czech Republic

The 2006 ICF Canoe Slalom World Championships were held in Prague, Czech Republic between 2-6 August 2006 under the auspices of International Canoe Federation at the Prague-Troja Canoeing Centre. It was the 30th edition. Prague became the second city to host both the slalom and sprint world championships, having hosted the latter in 1958 when Prague was part of Czechoslovakia. Nottingham, Great Britain was the first, hosting the slalom world championships in 1995 and the sprint world championships in 1981.

== Medal summary ==
=== Men's ===
==== Canoe ====
Event	Gold	Points	Silver	Points	Bronze	Points
C1	Tony Estanguet (FRA)	207.69	Michal Martikán (SVK)	209.00	Stanislav Ježek (CZE)	211.01
C1 team	Germany; Stefan Pfannmöller; Nico Bettge; Jan Benzien	233.24	Czech Republic; Tomáš Indruch; Jan Mašek; Stanislav Ježek	237.68	Great Britain; David Florence; Stuart McIntosh; Daniel Goddard	245.51
C2	Czech Republic; Jaroslav Volf; Ondřej Štěpánek	224.67	Germany; Marcus Becker; Stefan Henze	226.86	Slovakia; Pavol Hochschorner; Peter Hochschorner	229.84
C2 team	Czech Republic; Marek Jiras & Tomáš Máder; Jaroslav Volf & Ondřej Štěpánek; Jaroslav Pospíšil & Jaroslav Pollert	253.90	Germany; Marcus Becker & Stefan Henze; Felix Michel & Sebastian Piersig; Kay Simon & Robby Simon	261.90	Slovakia; Pavol Hochschorner & Peter Hochschorner; Milan Kubáň & Marián Olejník; Ľuboš Šoška & Peter Šoška	269.93

==== Kayak ====
Event	Gold	Points	Silver	Points	Bronze	Points
K1	Stefano Cipressi (ITA); Julien Billaut (FRA)	202.02; 204.49	-		Campbell Walsh (GBR)	204.78
K1 team	France; Fabien Lefèvre; Julien Billaut; Boris Neveu	223.51	Italy; Daniele Molmenti; Stefano Cipressi; Diego Paolini	229.52	Poland; Grzegorz Polaczyk; Mateusz Polaczyk; Dariusz Popiela	230.72

=== Women's ===
==== Kayak ====
Event	Gold	Points	Silver	Points	Bronze	Points
K1	Jana Dukátová (SVK)	224.09	Fiona Pennie (GBR)	227.41	Jennifer Bongardt (GER)	229.29
K1 team	France; Mathilde Pichery; Émilie Fer; Marie Gaspard	264.87	Czech Republic; Štěpánka Hilgertová; Irena Pavelková; Marie Řihošková	265.88	Germany; Jennifer Bongardt; Claudia Bär; Jasmin Schornberg	268.85

== Medal table ==
Rank	Nation	Gold	Silver	Bronze	Total
1	France (FRA)	4	0	0	4
2	Czech Republic (CZE)	2	2	1	5
3	Germany (GER)	1	2	2	5
4	Slovakia (SVK)	1	1	2	4
5	Italy (ITA)	1	1	0	2
6	Great Britain (GBR)	0	1	2	3
7	Poland (POL)	0	0	1	1
Totals (7 entries)		9	7	8	24
