= Kimberley Walsh (canoeist) =

British canoeist

Medal record

Women's canoe slalom

Representing Great Britain

World Championships
Silver medal – second place	2005 Penrith	K1 team

Junior World Championships
Bronze medal – third place	1998 Lofer	K1

Kimberley Walsh (born 1980) is a British slalom canoeist who competed at the international level from 1997 to 2006.

She won a silver medal in the K1 team event at the 2005 ICF Canoe Slalom World Championships in Penrith, west of Sydney.
