= 2007 European Canoe Slalom Championships =

The 2007 European Canoe Slalom Championships took place at the Ondrej Cibak Whitewater Slalom Course in Liptovský Mikuláš, Slovakia between June 11 and 17, 2007 under the auspices of the European Canoe Association (ECA). It was the 8th edition.

== Medal summary ==
=== Men's results ===
==== Canoe ====
Event	Gold	Points	Silver	Points	Bronze	Points
C1	Michal Martikán (SVK)	211.87	Pierre Labarelle (FRA)	215.21	Christos Tsakmakis (GRE)	216.08
C1 team	Slovakia; Michal Martikán; Juraj Minčík; Matej Beňuš	209.48	Germany; Stefan Pfannmöller; Nico Bettge; Jan Benzien	215.57	France; Tony Estanguet; Pierre Labarelle; Nicolas Peschier	220.25
C2	Slovakia; Ladislav Škantár; Peter Škantár	221.48	Czech Republic; Jaroslav Volf; Ondřej Štěpánek	221.83	Slovakia; Pavol Hochschorner; Peter Hochschorner	224.21
C2 team	Germany; Felix Michel & Sebastian Piersig; Kay Simon & Robby Simon; David Schröder & Frank Henze	243.67	Czech Republic; Jaroslav Volf & Ondřej Štěpánek; Marek Jiras & Tomáš Máder; Jaroslav Pospíšil & David Mrůzek	247.10	Poland; Marcin Pochwała & Paweł Sarna; Dariusz Wrzosek & Jarosław Miczek; Kamil Gondek & Andrzej Poparda	252.31

==== Kayak ====
Event	Gold	Points	Silver	Points	Bronze	Points
K1	Ján Šajbidor (SVK)	202.77	Peter Kauzer (SLO)	203.06	Campbell Walsh (GBR)	205.81
K1 team	Slovenia; Peter Kauzer; Dejan Kralj; Jure Meglič	205.76	Germany; Erik Pfannmöller; Alexander Grimm; Fabian Dörfler	208.63	United Kingdom; Campbell Walsh; Richard Hounslow; Huw Swetnam	211.91

=== Women's results ===
==== Kayak ====
Event	Gold	Points	Silver	Points	Bronze	Points
K1	Violetta Oblinger-Peters (AUT)	229.02	Mandy Planert (GER)	230.44	Štěpánka Hilgertová (CZE)	231.99
K1 team	Germany; Jennifer Bongardt; Mandy Planert; Jasmin Schornberg	235.70	Slovakia; Elena Kaliská; Jana Dukátová; Gabriela Stacherová	241.02	United Kingdom; Fiona Pennie; Laura Blakeman; Lizzie Neave	248.39

== Medal table ==
Rank	Nation	Gold	Silver	Bronze	Total
1	Slovakia (SVK)	4	1	1	6
2	Germany (GER)	2	3	0	5
3	Slovenia (SLO)	1	1	0	2
4	Austria (AUT)	1	0	0	1
5	Czech Republic (CZE)	0	2	1	3
6	France (FRA)	0	1	1	2
7	Great Britain (GBR)	0	0	3	3
8	Greece (GRE)	0	0	1	1
8	Poland (POL)	0	0	1	1
Totals (9 entries)		8	8	8	24
