= Patryk Brzeziński =

Polish rower

Personal information
- Nationality: Polish
- Born: 30 October 1984 (age 40); Poznań, Poland

Sport
- Sport: Rowing

Patryk Brzeziński (born 30 October 1984) is a Polish rower. He competed in the men's eight event at the 2008 Summer Olympics.
