= European Canoe Slalom Championships =

Annual international canoeing and kayaking event

- Status: Active
- Genre: Sporting Event
- Date: Mid-year
- Frequency: Annual
- Country: Varying
- Inaugurated: 1996 Augsburg
- Previous event: 2025 Vaires-sur-Marne
- Next event: 2026 Ivrea
- Organiser: Paddle Europe

The Paddle Europe Slalom Championships, known until 2025 as the European Canoe Slalom Championships is an annual international canoeing and kayaking event organized by Paddle Europe (previously known as the European Canoe Association) since 1996. Until 2004 it was held every two years.

== Editions ==
| # | Year | Host City | Host Country | Events |
|---|---|---|---|---|
Biannual
| 1 | 1996 | Augsburg | Germany | 8 |
| 2 | 1998 | Roudnice nad Labem | Czech Republic | 8 |
| 3 | 2000 | Mezzana | Italy | 7 |
| 4 | 2002 | Bratislava | Slovakia | 8 |
Annual
| 5 | 2004 | Skopje | North Macedonia | 6 |
| 6 | 2005 | Tacen | Slovenia | 8 |
| 7 | 2006 | L'Argentière-la-Bessée | France | 8 |
| 8 | 2007 | Liptovský Mikuláš | Slovakia | 8 |
| 9 | 2008 | Kraków | Poland | 8 |
| 10 | 2009 | Nottingham | United Kingdom | 8 |
| 11 | 2010 | Bratislava | Slovakia | 9 |
| 12 | 2011 | La Seu d'Urgell | Spain | 9 |
| 13 | 2012 | Augsburg | Germany | 9 |
| 14 | 2013 | Kraków | Poland | 9 |
| 15 | 2014 | Vienna | Austria | 9 |
| 16 | 2015 | Markkleeberg | Germany | 10 |
| 17 | 2016 | Liptovský Mikuláš | Slovakia | 10 |
| 18 | 2017 | Tacen | Slovenia | 10 |
| 19 | 2018 | Prague | Czech Republic | 10 |
| 20 | 2019 | Pau | France | 8 |
| 21 | 2020 | Prague | Czech Republic | 8 |
| 22 | 2021 | Ivrea | Italy | 10 |
| 23 | 2022 | Liptovský Mikuláš | Slovakia | 10 |
| 24 | 2023 | Kraków | Poland | 10 |
| 25 | 2024 | Tacen | Slovenia | 12 |
| 26 | 2025 | Vaires-sur-Marne | France | 12 |
| 27 | 2026 | Ivrea | Italy | 12 |
| 28 | 2027 | Kraków | Poland | |
| Total | | | | 244 |

== Medals Table ==
As of the 2026 Championships.

| Rank | Nation | Gold | Silver | Bronze | Total |
|---|---|---|---|---|---|
| 1 | Czech Republic | 55 | 43 | 44 | 142 |
| 2 | Slovakia | 50 | 26 | 26 | 102 |
| 3 | Germany | 36 | 41 | 38 | 115 |
| 4 | France | 28 | 39 | 33 | 100 |
| 5 | Great Britain | 23 | 17 | 33 | 73 |
| 6 | Slovenia | 18 | 15 | 15 | 48 |
| 7 | Italy | 9 | 10 | 13 | 32 |
| 8 | Poland | 6 | 26 | 12 | 44 |
| 9 | Spain | 6 | 6 | 12 | 24 |
| 10 | Austria | 5 | 13 | 9 | 27 |
| 11 | Switzerland | 5 | 6 | 6 | 17 |
| 12 | Ireland | 1 | 1 | 0 | 2 |
| 13 | Andorra | 1 | 0 | 0 | 1 |
| 13 | Belgium | 1 | 0 | 0 | 1 |
| 13 | Ukraine | 1 | 0 | 0 | 1 |
| 16 | Russia | 0 | 0 | 2 | 2 |
| 17 | Greece | 0 | 0 | 1 | 1 |
| Totals (17 entries) | | 245 | 243 | 244 | 732 |

Note: One shared gold at the 2022 European Canoe Slalom Championships.

== List of medalists ==
- List of European Canoe Slalom Championships medalists

== See also ==
- European Junior and U23 Canoe Slalom Championships
- ICF Canoe Slalom World Championships
- ICF World Junior and U23 Canoe Slalom Championships
- Canoe Slalom World Cup
- Canoeing and kayaking at the Summer Olympics
- Asian Canoe Slalom Championships
- Ocean Canoe Slalom Championships
- African Canoe Slalom Championships
- Pan American Canoe Slalom Championships
- Canoe slalom
