= 2025 ICF Canoe Slalom World Championships – Men's kayak cross individual =

Men's kayak cross individual at the 2025 ICF Canoe Slalom World Championships
- Venue: Penrith Whitewater Stadium
- Location: Penrith, Australia
- Dates: 29 September 2025
- Competitors: 73 from 34 nations

Medalists
gold medal	David Llorente	Spain
silver medal	Joseph Clarke	Great Britain
bronze medal	Jakub Krejčí	Czech Republic

The men's kayak cross individual event at the 2025 ICF Canoe Slalom World Championships took place on 29 September 2025 at the Penrith Whitewater Stadium in Penrith. It was the first time that medals were awarded for the time trial part of a kayak cross event at the World Championships.

== Competition format ==
The kayak cross individual time trial event is a single run competition which also serves as the qualification for the kayak cross event where 4 paddlers race each other head-to-head. Top 42 paddlers from the kayak cross individual time trial advanced to the knockout phase at these championships.

Paddlers start their run by sliding off the starting platform several meters above the water. Then they must navigate the downstream and upstream gates. Unlike in classic slalom, paddlers are allowed to touch the gates and even intentionally move them with their paddle, but not with a free hand. There is also a designated zone where paddlers must perform an Eskimo roll.

Athletes can be penalized by receiving a fault (FLT). Faults are incurred for false starts, missing gates or failing to correctly perform the Eskimo roll. Athletes are ranked according to the time they achieve, with those incurring faults ranked at the bottom.

== Results ==
Top 42 qualified for the kayak cross event.

Rank	Bib	Athlete	Nation	Time	Notes
1st place, gold medalist(s)	4	David Llorente	Spain	55.21	Q
2nd place, silver medalist(s)	1	Joseph Clarke	Great Britain	56.33	Q
3rd place, bronze medalist(s)	19	Jakub Krejčí	Czech Republic	56.89	Q
4	37	Jakub Grigar	Slovakia	57.13	Q
5	22	Matyáš Novák	Czech Republic	57.17	Q
6	8	Jonny Dickson	Great Britain	57.27	Q
7	5	Manuel Ochoa	Spain	57.48	Q
8	7	Mathurin Madoré	France	57.49	Q
9	2	Finn Butcher	New Zealand	57.93	Q
10	26	Timothy Anderson	Australia	58.09	Q
11	28	Titouan Castryck	France	58.15	Q
12	9	Benjamin Renia	France	58.27	Q
13	13	Jan Rohrer	Switzerland	58.49	Q
14	17	Alex Baldoni	Canada	58.52	Q
15	15	Žiga Lin Hočevar	Slovenia	58.78	Q
16	16	Sam Leaver	Great Britain	58.99	Q
17	11	Giovanni De Gennaro	Italy	59.09	Q
18	10	Pedro Gonçalves	Brazil	59.17	Q
19	38	Martin Rudorfer	Czech Republic	59.29	Q
20	14	Noah Hegge	Germany	59.30	Q
21	50	Jakub Brzeziński	Poland	59.53	Q
22	58	Ivan Kozlov	Individual Neutral Athletes	59.66	Q
23	31	Nicholas Collier	New Zealand	59.70	Q
24	25	Stefan Hengst	Germany	59.89	Q
25	33	Xabier Ferrazzi	Italy	59.93	Q
26	29	Maxime Aubertin	Belgium	59.95	Q
27	32	Artem Ivchenko	Ukraine	59.98	Q
28	34	Martin Halčin	Slovakia	60.01	Q
29	6	Mateusz Polaczyk	Poland	60.02	Q
30	59	Pavel Eigel	Uzbekistan	60.04	Q
31	18	Gabriel De Coster	Belgium	60.13	Q
32	3	Martin Dougoud	Switzerland	60.17	Q
33	27	Benjamin Pope	Australia	60.19	Q
34	51	Serhii Sovko	Ukraine	60.24	Q
35	68	Lyu Luhui	China	60.25	Q
36	40	Alistair McCreery	Ireland	60.26	Q
37	43	Mario Leitner	Austria	60.35	Q
38	21	Tillmann Röller	Germany	61.02	Q
39	24	Tadeusz Kuchno	Poland	61.12	Q
40	23	Gelindo Chiariello	Switzerland	61.52	Q
41	20	Lucien Delfour	Australia	61.57	Q
42	12	Andraz Echeverría Olguín	Chile	61.65	Q
43	66	Nikita Gubenko	Individual Neutral Athletes	62.30	
44	41	Pau Echaniz	Spain	62.48	
45	47	Trevor Boyd	Canada	62.66	
46	48	Moritz Kremslehner	Austria	62.83	
47	62	Zhang Jiahao	China	63.41	
48	52	Thomas Ukalovic	Croatia	63.43	
49	44	Jan Ločnikar	Slovenia	63.90	
50	67	Wu Shao-hsuan	Chinese Taipei	64.16	
51	35	Frederico Alvarenga	Portugal	64.43	
52	53	Guilherme Mapelli	Brazil	64.63	
53	57	Yuuki Tanaka	Japan	64.85	
54	49	João Cunha	Portugal	65.01	
55	42	Mark Zielonka	Canada	66.02	
56	46	Kaelin Friedenson	United States	66.10	
57	36	Kyler James Long	United States	67.24	
58	60	Mārtiņš Plaudis	Latvia	67.42	
59	45	Manuel Trípano	Argentina	68.54	
60	54	Antonio Reinoso	Mexico	70.70	
61	61	Adam Gonšenica	Slovakia	71.04	
62	39	Huang Liman	China	59.53	FLT (7)
63	65	Egor Smirnov	Individual Neutral Athletes	69.87	FLT (6)
64	55	Yusuke Muto	Japan	70.25	FLT (6)
65	72	Liao Li-hong	Chinese Taipei	74.06	FLT (6)
66	30	Mathieu Desnos	Brazil	63.16	FLT (2)
67	56	Lucas Jacob	Portugal	70.68	FLT (2)
68	63	Nikhil Nijhawan	United States	71.68	FLT (2)
69	73	Ng Wee Meng	Singapore	DNF	
70	64	George Snook	New Zealand	DSQ	
	70	Samuel Muchiri	Kenya	DNS	
	71	Mustafa Parlak	Turkey	DNS	
	69	Angel Petrushev	North Macedonia	DNS	
