= 2025 ICF Canoe Slalom World Championships – Men's K1 =

Men's kayak at the 2025 ICF Canoe Slalom World Championships
- Venue: Penrith Whitewater Stadium
- Location: Penrith, Australia
- Dates: 1–3 October 2025
- Competitors: 75 from 32 nations

Medalists
gold medal	Titouan Castryck	France
silver medal	Jakub Krejčí	Czech Republic
bronze medal	Jiří Prskavec	Czech Republic

The men's kayak event at the 2025 ICF Canoe Slalom World Championships took place on 3 October 2025 at the Penrith Whitewater Stadium in Penrith, with the qualification heats on 1 October 2025.

== Competition format ==
The event uses a three-round format with qualification heats, semifinal and final. The top 30 paddlers from the single qualification run qualify for the semifinal. Paddlers start in the reverse order of their qualification position in the semifinal and complete a single run, with the top 12 advancing to the final. The start list for the final is once again in reverse order of the semifinal results. The athlete with the best time in the single-run final is awarded gold.

A penalty of 2 seconds is awarded for touching a gate and a 50-second penalty is awarded for missing a gate or negotiating it in the opposite direction.

The qualification course had 22 gates including 6 upstream gates (2-7-10-11-15-21). The semifinal and final course had 25 gates with 6 upstream gates (4-5-11-12-20-24).

== Schedule ==
All times listed are UTC+10.

Date	Time	Round
1 October 2025
1 October 2025	10:40	Heats
3 October 2025
3 October 2025	11:38	Semifinal
3 October 2025	15:17	Final

== Results ==
Penalties are included in the time shown. The fastest time in each round is shown in bold.

Rank	Bib	Canoeist	Nation	Heats			Semifinal			Final		
Rank	Bib	Canoeist	Nation	Time	Pen	Rank	Time	Pen	Rank	Time	Pen	Rank
1	1	Titouan Castryck	France	88.89	0	12	**91.51**	0	1	**90.81**	0	1
2	8	Jakub Krejčí	Czech Republic	**86.94**	0	1	92.83	2	3	92.27	0	2
3	4	Jiří Prskavec	Czech Republic	89.78	0	20	95.44	0	9	92.34	0	3
4	15	Finn Butcher	New Zealand	91.21	2	28	96.21	2	12	92.47	0	4
5	7	Lucien Delfour	Australia	88.05	0	3	93.74	0	4	92.96	2	5
6	5	Peter Kauzer	Slovenia	88.18	0	6	94.73	2	7	93.26	0	6
7	2	Anatole Delassus	France	88.29	0	9	95.85	2	10	93.34	0	7
8	22	Gabriel De Coster	Belgium	88.15	0	5	94.63	2	5	94.25	0	8
9	24	Mario Leitner	Austria	90.14	0	23	96.20	0	11	94.37	0	9
10	13	Timothy Anderson	Australia	88.43	0	11	94.71	2	6	94.46	0	10
11	64	Egor Smirnov	Individual Neutral Athletes	89.28	0	15	91.67	0	2	95.06	2	11
12	3	Giovanni De Gennaro	Italy	89.89	0	21	94.98	0	8	95.87	2	12
13	6	Mateusz Polaczyk	Poland	90.40	4	24	96.25	2	13	did not advance		
14	14	Xabier Ferrazzi	Italy	88.24	0	8	96.27	2	14	did not advance		
15	25	Martin Halčin	Slovakia	90.72	0	27	96.49	0	15	did not advance		
16	17	Miquel Travé	Spain	88.29	0	9	96.56	2	16	did not advance		
17	30	Stefan Hengst	Germany	90.07	2	22	97.47	4	17	did not advance		
18	32	Jonny Dickson	Great Britain	88.11	0	4	97.67	2	18	did not advance		
19	31	Mathieu Desnos	Brazil	89.62	0	18	97.78	2	19	did not advance		
20	16	Pau Echaniz	Spain	89.77	0	19	99.18	2	20	did not advance		
21	11	Martin Dougoud	Switzerland	87.40	0	2	100.09	2	21	did not advance		
22	45	Noel Hendrick	Ireland	91.62	0	30	100.92	0	22	did not advance		
23	70	Kazuya Adachi	Japan	88.20	0	7	101.49	6	23	did not advance		
24	65	Ivan Kozlov	Individual Neutral Athletes	89.08	2	13	103.03	6	24	did not advance		
25	28	Jan Rohrer	Switzerland	89.42	0	16	103.85	2	25	did not advance		
26	38	Yusuke Muto	Japan	91.23	2	29	104.72	6	26	did not advance		
27	34	Benjamin Pope	Australia	89.14	0	14	145.46	52	27	did not advance		
28	27	Jakub Grigar	Slovakia	90.54	0	25	147.25	52	28	did not advance		
29	40	Yuuki Tanaka	Japan	89.44	0	17	148.51	54	29	did not advance		
30	23	Marcello Beda	Italy	90.54	0	25	151.81	52	30	did not advance		
31	35	Jakub Brzeziński	Poland	91.81	0	31	did not advance					
32	36	Maxime Aubertin	Belgium	91.81	2	31	did not advance					
33	9	Joseph Clarke	Great Britain	91.89	2	33	did not advance					
34	41	Adam Gonšenica	Slovakia	92.14	0	34	did not advance					
35	10	Žiga Lin Hočevar	Slovenia	92.23	2	35	did not advance					
36	18	Benjamin Renia	France	92.41	2	36	did not advance					
37	33	Jan Bárta	Czech Republic	92.83	2	37	did not advance					
38	74	Lyu Luhui	China	92.91	2	38	did not advance					
39	71	George Snook	New Zealand	93.10	0	39	did not advance					
40	19	Gelindo Chiariello	Switzerland	93.79	2	40	did not advance					
41	58	Huang Liman	China	93.97	0	41	did not advance					
42	57	Pavel Eigel	Uzbekistan	94.06	2	42	did not advance					
43	49	Reilly Vernon	Ireland	94.16	2	43	did not advance					
44	43	Lucas Jacob	Portugal	94.55	0	44	did not advance					
45	73	Zhang Jiahao	China	94.59	0	45	did not advance					
46	60	Wu Shao-hsuan	Chinese Taipei	94.66	2	46	did not advance					
47	44	Frederico Alvarenga	Portugal	94.83	0	47	did not advance					
48	54	João Cunha	Portugal	95.38	2	48	did not advance					
49	51	Thomas Ukalovic	Croatia	95.67	0	49	did not advance					
50	59	Alistair McCreery	Ireland	96.15	2	50	did not advance					
51	37	Pedro Gonçalves	Brazil	96.30	4	51	did not advance					
52	47	Artem Ivchenko	Ukraine	96.46	2	52	did not advance					
53	53	Manuel Trípano	Argentina	96.72	0	53	did not advance					
54	48	Moritz Kremslehner	Austria	98.50	2	54	did not advance					
55	52	Serhii Sovko	Ukraine	98.51	2	55	did not advance					
56	46	Alex Baldoni	Canada	98.71	4	56	did not advance					
57	39	Angel Petrushev	North Macedonia	99.59	4	57	did not advance					
58	66	Mark Zielonka	Canada	99.69	0	58	did not advance					
59	61	Kyler James Long	United States	100.01	4	59	did not advance					
60	68	Liao Li-hong	Chinese Taipei	104.71	4	60	did not advance					
61	72	Antonio Reinoso	Mexico	108.15	2	61	did not advance					
62	63	Andraz Echeverría Olguín	Chile	111.61	4	62	did not advance					
63	62	Trevor Boyd	Canada	112.79	4	63	did not advance					
64	67	Mārtiņš Plaudis	Latvia	122.74	6	64	did not advance					
65	20	Martin Srabotnik	Slovenia	138.50	50	65	did not advance					
66	29	Dariusz Popiela	Poland	138.77	50	66	did not advance					
67	21	Ben Haylett	Great Britain	139.96	50	67	did not advance					
68	12	Noah Hegge	Germany	140.09	50	68	did not advance					
69	26	David Llorente	Spain	140.32	52	69	did not advance					
70	55	Guilherme Mapelli	Brazil	142.35	50	70	did not advance					
71	42	Kaelin Friedenson	United States	144.17	52	71	did not advance					
72	56	Nicholas Collier	New Zealand	147.00	52	72	did not advance					
73	50	Tyler Westfall	United States	147.46	54	73	did not advance					
74	69	Nikita Gubenko	Individual Neutral Athletes	148.33	54	74	did not advance					
	75	Samuel Muchiri	Kenya	Did not start								
