= 2025 ICF Canoe Slalom World Championships – Men's kayak cross =

Men's kayak cross at the 2025 ICF Canoe Slalom World Championships
- Venue: Penrith Whitewater Stadium
- Location: Penrith, Australia
- Dates: 29 September – 4 October 2025
- Competitors: 73 from 34 nations

Medalists
gold medal	Joseph Clarke	Great Britain
silver medal	Mathurin Madoré	France
bronze medal	Matyáš Novák	Czech Republic

The men's kayak cross event at the 2025 ICF Canoe Slalom World Championships took place on 4 October 2025 at the Penrith Whitewater Stadium in Penrith, with the qualification time trial on 29 September 2025.

== Competition format ==
The kayak cross event is split into two phases – qualification time trials and knockout phase where 3 or 4 paddlers race each other head-to-head. Top 42 paddlers from the individual time trial (which is a medal event in itself) advance to the knockout phase.

Paddlers start their run by sliding off the starting platform several meters above the water. Then they must navigate the downstream and upstream gates. Unlike in classic slalom, paddlers are allowed to touch the gates and even intentionally move them with their paddle, but not with a free hand. There is also a designated zone where paddlers must perform an Eskimo roll.

Athletes can be penalized in three ways in each round, by receiving a fault (FLT) or by being ranked as lower (RAL). Faults are incurred for false starts, missing gates or failing to correctly perform the Eskimo roll. Athletes are ranked as lower (RAL) if they breach the safety requirements of the competition, such as by holding back another athlete with their hands or paddle, deliberately paddling over another athlete's boat, or by making dangerous contact with another athlete's head or body - all other non-dangerous contact is allowed. In each round athletes are ranked first by the order in which they cross the finish line, with those incurring penalties ranked in the following order: FLT, RAL, DNF, DNS.

The final classification of athletes is determined in the following manner: Athletes eliminated at any phase of the competition will be given their rank based on the comparison of the qualification times of athletes eliminated at the same phase. All 3rd ranked athletes will be ranked above all 4th ranked athletes.

== Schedule ==
All times listed are UTC+10.

Date	Time	Round
29 September 2025	13:33	Time trial
4 October 2025
4 October 2025	10:41	Round 1
4 October 2025	11:42	Repechage round
4 October 2025	13:02	Heats
4 October 2025	14:27	Quarterfinals
4 October 2025	14:58	Semifinals
4 October 2025	15:15	Small final
4 October 2025	15:32	Final

== Results ==
=== Time trial ===
- 2025 ICF Canoe Slalom World Championships – Men's kayak cross individual

=== Round 1 ===
Top 2 from each race advance to the heats. The rest go to repechage.

Proceed to heats
Proceed to repechage

Race 1
Rank	Bib	Athlete	Country	Notes
1	1	David Llorente	Spain	
2	12	Benjamin Renia	France	
3	33	Benjamin Pope	Australia	

Race 2
Rank	Bib	Athlete	Country	Notes
1	2	Joseph Clarke	Great Britain	
2	13	Jan Rohrer	Switzerland	
3	32	Martin Dougoud	Switzerland	

Race 3
Rank	Bib	Athlete	Country	Notes
1	3	Jakub Krejčí	Czech Republic	
2	14	Alex Baldoni	Canada	
3	42	Andraz Echeverría Olguín	Chile	
4	31	Gabriel De Coster	Belgium	FLT (5)

Race 4
Rank	Bib	Athlete	Country	Notes
1	15	Žiga Lin Hočevar	Slovenia	
2	4	Jakub Grigar	Slovakia	
3	30	Pavel Eigel	Uzbekistan	
4	41	Lucien Delfour	Australia	FLT (8)

Race 5
Rank	Bib	Athlete	Country	Notes
1	5	Matyáš Novák	Czech Republic	
2	16	Sam Leaver	Great Britain	
3	40	Gelindo Chiariello	Switzerland	
4	29	Mateusz Polaczyk	Poland	

Race 6
Rank	Bib	Athlete	Country	Notes
1	6	Jonny Dickson	Great Britain	
2	17	Giovanni De Gennaro	Italy	
3	39	Tadeusz Kuchno	Poland	
4	28	Martin Halčin	Slovakia	

Race 7
Rank	Bib	Athlete	Country	Notes
1	7	Manuel Ochoa	Spain	
2	38	Tillmann Röller	Germany	
3	18	Pedro Gonçalves	Brazil	
4	27	Artem Ivchenko	Ukraine	

Race 8
Rank	Bib	Athlete	Country	Notes
1	26	Maxime Aubertin	Belgium	
2	8	Mathurin Madoré	France	
3	37	Mario Leitner	Austria	
4	19	Martin Rudorfer	Czech Republic	FLT (2)

Race 9
Rank	Bib	Athlete	Country	Notes
1	9	Finn Butcher	New Zealand	
2	36	Alistair McCreery	Ireland	
3	20	Noah Hegge	Germany	FLT (5)
4	25	Xabier Ferrazzi	Italy	FLT (2)

Race 10
Rank	Bib	Athlete	Country	Notes
1	10	Timothy Anderson	Australia	
2	35	Lyu Luhui	China	
3	21	Jakub Brzeziński	Poland	FLT (6)
4	24	Stefan Hengst	Germany	FLT (5)

Race 11
Rank	Bib	Athlete	Country	Notes
1	11	Titouan Castryck	France	
2	23	Nicholas Collier	New Zealand	
3	22	Ivan Kozlov	Individual Neutral Athletes	
4	34	Serhii Sovko	Ukraine	

=== Repechage ===
Top 2 from each race advance to the heats. The rest are eliminated.

Proceed to heats
Eliminated

Race 1
Rank	Bib	Athlete	Country	Notes
1	24	Stefan Hengst	Germany	
2	18	Pedro Gonçalves	Brazil	
3	34	Serhii Sovko	Ukraine	
4	42	Andraz Echeverría Olguín	Chile	

Race 2
Rank	Bib	Athlete	Country	Notes
1	19	Martin Rudorfer	Czech Republic	
2	41	Lucien Delfour	Australia	
3	33	Benjamin Pope	Australia	
4	25	Xabier Ferrazzi	Italy	FLT (5)

Race 3
Rank	Bib	Athlete	Country	Notes
1	20	Noah Hegge	Germany	
2	27	Artem Ivchenko	Ukraine	
3	32	Martin Dougoud	Switzerland	
4	40	Gelindo Chiariello	Switzerland	

Race 4
Rank	Bib	Athlete	Country	Notes
1	39	Tadeusz Kuchno	Poland	
2	28	Martin Halčin	Slovakia	
3	21	Jakub Brzeziński	Poland	
4	31	Gabriel De Coster	Belgium	FLT (5)

Race 5
Rank	Bib	Athlete	Country	Notes
1	29	Mateusz Polaczyk	Poland	
2	37	Mario Leitner	Austria	
3	30	Pavel Eigel	Uzbekistan	
4	22	Ivan Kozlov	Individual Neutral Athletes	

=== Heats ===
Top 2 from each race advance to the quarterfinals. The rest are eliminated.

Proceed to quarterfinals
Eliminated

Race 1
Rank	Bib	Athlete	Country	Notes
1	17	Sam Leaver	Great Britain	
2	32	Lucien Delfour	Australia	
3	16	Alex Baldoni	Canada	
4	1	David Llorente	Spain	FLT (5)

Race 2
Rank	Bib	Athlete	Country	Notes
1	24	Noah Hegge	Germany	
2	9	Titouan Castryck	France	
3	8	Timothy Anderson	Australia	
4	25	Stefan Hengst	Germany	FLT (5)

Race 3
Rank	Bib	Athlete	Country	Notes
1	12	Jakub Grigar	Slovakia	
2	28	Pedro Gonçalves	Brazil	
3	5	Jonny Dickson	Great Britain	
4	21	Alistair McCreery	Ireland	

Race 4
Rank	Bib	Athlete	Country	Notes
1	4	Matyáš Novák	Czech Republic	
2	13	Mathurin Madoré	France	
3	20	Lyu Luhui	China	
4	29	Artem Ivchenko	Ukraine	

Race 5
Rank	Bib	Athlete	Country	Notes
1	3	Jakub Krejčí	Czech Republic	
2	14	Benjamin Renia	France	
3	19	Nicholas Collier	New Zealand	
4	30	Martin Halčin	Slovakia	FLT (5)

Race 6
Rank	Bib	Athlete	Country	Notes
1	11	Maxime Aubertin	Belgium	
2	6	Manuel Ochoa	Spain	
3	27	Tadeusz Kuchno	Poland	
4	22	Tillmann Röller	Germany	FLT (2)

Race 7
Rank	Bib	Athlete	Country	Notes
1	7	Finn Butcher	New Zealand	
2	26	Mateusz Polaczyk	Poland	
3	10	Žiga Lin Hočevar	Slovenia	
4	23	Martin Rudorfer	Czech Republic	

Race 8
Rank	Bib	Athlete	Country	Notes
1	2	Joseph Clarke	Great Britain	
2	18	Giovanni De Gennaro	Italy	
3	31	Mario Leitner	Austria	
4	15	Jan Rohrer	Switzerland	FLT (5)

=== Quarterfinals ===
Top 2 from each race advance to the semifinals. The rest are eliminated.

Proceed to semifinals
Eliminated

Race 1
Rank	Bib	Athlete	Country	Notes
1	24	Noah Hegge	Germany	
2	9	Titouan Castryck	France	
3	17	Sam Leaver	Great Britain	
4	32	Lucien Delfour	Australia	FLT (2)

Race 2
Rank	Bib	Athlete	Country	Notes
1	4	Matyáš Novák	Czech Republic	
2	13	Mathurin Madoré	France	
3	28	Pedro Gonçalves	Brazil	
4	12	Jakub Grigar	Slovakia	

Race 3
Rank	Bib	Athlete	Country	Notes
1	3	Jakub Krejčí	Czech Republic	
2	11	Maxime Aubertin	Belgium	
3	14	Benjamin Renia	France	
4	6	Manuel Ochoa	Spain	

Race 4
Rank	Bib	Athlete	Country	Notes
1	2	Joseph Clarke	Great Britain	
2	7	Finn Butcher	New Zealand	
3	26	Mateusz Polaczyk	Poland	
4	18	Giovanni De Gennaro	Italy	FLT (5)

=== Semifinals ===
Top 2 from each race advance to the final. The rest go to the small final.

Proceed to final
Proceed to small final

Race 1
Rank	Bib	Athlete	Country	Notes
1	4	Matyáš Novák	Czech Republic	
2	13	Mathurin Madoré	France	
3	24	Noah Hegge	Germany	
4	9	Titouan Castryck	France	FLT (5)

Race 2
Rank	Bib	Athlete	Country	Notes
1	2	Joseph Clarke	Great Britain	
2	11	Maxime Aubertin	Belgium	
3	7	Finn Butcher	New Zealand	
4	3	Jakub Krejčí	Czech Republic	

=== Small final ===
Rank	Bib	Athlete	Country	Notes
1	7	Finn Butcher	New Zealand	
2	9	Titouan Castryck	France	
3	24	Noah Hegge	Germany	
4	3	Jakub Krejčí	Czech Republic	RAL

=== Final ===
Rank	Bib	Athlete	Country	Notes
1st place, gold medalist(s)	2	Joseph Clarke	Great Britain	
2nd place, silver medalist(s)	13	Mathurin Madoré	France	
3rd place, bronze medalist(s)	4	Matyáš Novák	Czech Republic	
4	11	Maxime Aubertin	Belgium	FLT (2)

=== Final ranking (Top 42) ===
The top 42 ranking determined by the knockout rounds.

Rank	Athlete	Country	Heat rank
1st place, gold medalist(s)	Joseph Clarke	Great Britain	1
2nd place, silver medalist(s)	Mathurin Madoré	France	2
3rd place, bronze medalist(s)	Matyáš Novák	Czech Republic	3
4	Maxime Aubertin	Belgium	4
5	Finn Butcher	New Zealand	1
6	Titouan Castryck	France	2
7	Noah Hegge	Germany	3
8	Jakub Krejčí	Czech Republic	4 (RAL)
9	Benjamin Renia	France	QF3 (3)
10	Sam Leaver	Great Britain	QF1 (3)
11	Mateusz Polaczyk	Poland	QF4 (3)
12	Pedro Gonçalves	Brazil	QF2 (3)
13	Manuel Ochoa	Spain	QF3 (4)
14	Jakub Grigar	Slovakia	QF2 (4)
15	Giovanni De Gennaro	Italy	QF4 (4)
16	Lucien Delfour	Australia	QF1 (4)
17	Jonny Dickson	Great Britain	H3 (3)
18	Timothy Anderson	Australia	H2 (3)
19	Žiga Lin Hočevar	Slovenia	H7 (3)
20	Alex Baldoni	Canada	H1 (3)
21	Nicholas Collier	New Zealand	H5 (3)
22	Lyu Luhui	China	H4 (3)
23	Tadeusz Kuchno	Poland	H6 (3)
24	Mario Leitner	Austria	H8 (3)
25	David Llorente	Spain	H1 (4)
26	Jan Rohrer	Switzerland	H8 (4)
27	Alistair McCreery	Ireland	H3 (4)
28	Tillmann Röller	Germany	H6 (4)
29	Martin Rudorfer	Czech Republic	H7 (4)
30	Stefan Hengst	Germany	H2 (4)
31	Artem Ivchenko	Ukraine	H4 (4)
32	Martin Halčin	Slovakia	H5 (4)
33	Jakub Brzeziński	Poland	RE (3)
34	Pavel Eigel	Uzbekistan	RE (3)
35	Martin Dougoud	Switzerland	RE (3)
36	Benjamin Pope	Australia	RE (3)
37	Serhii Sovko	Ukraine	RE (3)
38	Ivan Kozlov	Individual Neutral Athletes	RE (4)
39	Xabier Ferrazzi	Italy	RE (4)
40	Gabriel De Coster	Belgium	RE (4)
41	Gelindo Chiariello	Switzerland	RE (4)
42	Andraz Echeverría Olguín	Chile	RE (4)
