= 2025 ICF Canoe Slalom World Championships – Men's K1 team =

Men's kayak teams at the 2025 ICF Canoe Slalom World Championships
- Venue: Penrith Whitewater Stadium
- Location: Penrith, Australia
- Dates: 1 October 2025
- Competitors: 57 from 19 nations
- Teams: 19

Medalists
gold medal	Titouan Castryck; Benjamin Renia; Anatole Delassus	France
silver medal	Yusuke Muto; Yuuki Tanaka; Kazuya Adachi	Japan
bronze medal	Ben Haylett; Jonny Dickson; Joseph Clarke	Great Britain

The men's kayak team event at the 2025 ICF Canoe Slalom World Championships took place on 1 October 2025 at Lee Valley White Water Centre in Penrith.

== Competition format ==
Team events use a single run format with the team with the fastest time including penalties awarded gold. Teams consist of three paddlers from the same country.

Penalties are accumulated for each athlete, such that a team can incur a total of 150 seconds of penalties on a single gate (if all three miss it) or 6 seconds (if all three touch it). The time begins when the first paddler crosses the start beam and ends when the last one crosses the finish beam. All three paddlers must cross the finish line within 15 seconds of each other or else incur an additional 50-second penalty.

The teams had to navigate a total of 20 gates along the course, including 6 upstream gates (2-7-10-11-15-20).

== Results ==
Rank	Bib	Country	Athletes	Result		
Rank	Bib	Country	Athletes	Time	Pen	Total
1st place, gold medalist(s)	2	France	Titouan Castryck; Benjamin Renia; Anatole Delassus	95.30	0	95.30
2nd place, silver medalist(s)	16	Japan	Yusuke Muto; Yuuki Tanaka; Kazuya Adachi	95.36	0	95.36
3rd place, bronze medalist(s)	15	Great Britain	Ben Haylett; Jonny Dickson; Joseph Clarke	95.40	0	95.40
4	5	Slovakia	Jakub Grigar; Martin Halčin; Adam Gonšenica	97.35	0	97.35
5	7	Australia	Lucien Delfour; Timothy Anderson; Benjamin Pope	97.53	0	97.53
6	4	Italy	Giovanni De Gennaro; Xabier Ferrazzi; Marcello Beda	95.59	2	97.59
7	1	Czech Republic	Jiří Prskavec; Jakub Krejčí; Jan Bárta	95.91	2	97.91
8	6	Slovenia	Peter Kauzer; Martin Srabotnik; Žiga Lin Hočevar	97.14	2	99.14
9	9	Switzerland	Martin Dougoud; Gelindo Chiarello; Jan Rohrer	98.12	2	100.12
10	8	Spain	Pau Echaniz; Miquel Travé; David Llorente	97.40	4	101.40
11	14	China	Huang Liman; Lyu Luhui; Zhang Jiahao	99.60	2	101.60
12	19	New Zealand	Finn Butcher; George Snook; Nicholas Collier	100.13	2	102.13
13	3	Poland	Mateusz Polaczyk; Jakub Brzeziński; Dariusz Popiela	96.84	6	102.84
14	10	Brazil	Mathieu Desnos; Pedro Gonçalves; Guilherme Mapelli	99.27	4	103.27
15	12	Portugal	Frederico Alvarenga; João Cunha; Lucas Jacob	102.59	4	106.59
16	17	Canada	Alex Baldoni; Trevor Boyd; Mark Zielonka	106.46	2	108.46
17	13	United States	Kaelin Friedenson; Kyler James Long; Tyler Westfall	102.92	6	108.92
18	11	Ireland	Noel Hendrick; Reilly Vernon; Alistair McCreery	104.61	52	156.61
19	18	Chinese Taipei	Wu Shao-hsuan; Liao Li-hong; Wu Jung-cheng	126.79	56	182.79
