= 2026 Canoe Slalom World Cup =

Canoe Slalom World Cup

The 2026 Canoe Slalom World Cup was the highest level season-long series of competitions across eight canoe slalom disciplines organized by Paddle Worldwide (previously known as the International Canoe Federation). It was the 39th edition and featured five stops (or races) in five different venues.

Canoeists competed for the title of the overall world cup champion in each of the eight disciplines (4 for men and 4 for women), which were determined by the total number of points obtained from the five races.

== Calendar ==
The series opened with World Cup Race 1 in Tacen, Slovenia (29-31 May) and concluded with the World Cup Final in La Seu, Spain (10-13 September).

Label	Venue	Date	Note
World Cup Race 1	(Slovenia) Tacen	29-31 May	
World Cup Race 2	(Czech Republic) Prague	5-7 June	
World Cup Race 3	(Germany) Augsburg	12-14 June	
World Cup Race 4	(France) Vaires-sur-Marne	3-5 September	Olympic qualification stage 2
World Cup Final	(Spain) La Seu	10-13 September	Olympic qualification stage 3

== Standings ==
The winner of each race was awarded 60 points (with double points awarded for the World Cup Final). Points for lower places differed for kayak cross.

=== C1 men ===
Pos	Athlete	SLO (Slovenia)	CZE (Czech Republic)	GER (Germany)	FRA (France)	ESP (Spain)	Points
1	Žiga Lin Hočevar (SLO)	1	4	7	2	2	311
2	Nicolas Gestin (FRA)	5	1	59	5	3	250
3	Miquel Travé (ESP)	16	5	62	4	1	239
4	Adam Burgess (GBR)	20	3	2	23	6	231
5	Václav Chaloupka (CZE)	2	6		1	20	203
6	Liam Jegou (IRL)	8	20	14	20	7	193
7	Benjamin Savšek (SLO)	10	22	12	8	10	192
8	Matej Beňuš (SVK)	14	17	3	18	13	190
9	Luka Božič (SLO)	3	9	20	19	16	187
10	Ryan Westley (GBR)	6	54	5	3	21	182

=== C1 women ===
Pos	Athlete	SLO (Slovenia)	CZE (Czech Republic)	GER (Germany)	FRA (France)	ESP (Spain)	Points
1	Eva Alina Hočevar (SLO)	2	4	11	2	20	234
2	Jessica Fox (AUS)		1	1	11	7	232
3	Tereza Kneblová (CZE)	1	7	37	22	3	223
4	Miren Lazkano (ESP)	4	43	10	17	2	218
5	Lea Novak (SLO)	8	12	7	21	9	203
6	Ana Sátila (BRA)		8	40	7	1	200
7	Zuzana Paňková (SVK)	6	14	41	1	12	195
8	Mònica Dòria (AND)		10	9	13	4	192
9	Kimberley Woods (GBR)	13	3		5	13	184
10	Angèle Hug (FRA)	10	49	13	14	5	183
10	Martina Satková (CZE)	11	2	3	6	32	183

=== K1 men ===
Pos	Athlete	SLO (Slovenia)	CZE (Czech Republic)	GER (Germany)	FRA (France)	ESP (Spain)	Points
1	Xabier Ferrazzi (ITA)	1	3	3	11	2	302
2	Giovanni De Gennaro (ITA)	6	18	2	1	3	282
3	Jakub Krejčí (CZE)	3	1	1	78	4	264
4	Titouan Castryck (FRA)	26	6	12	2	1	261
5	Joseph Clarke (GBR)	5	2	10	4	19	227
6	Mateusz Polaczyk (POL)	14	4	6	8	22	197
7	Michał Pasiut (POL)	2	9	16	58	10	188
8	Miquel Travé (ESP)	10	14	26	55	5	166
9	Martin Cornu (FRA)	12	10	4	3	78	165
10	Pau Echaniz (ESP)	7	17	23	39	9	159
10	Finn Butcher (NZL)	11	37	14	6	16	159

=== K1 women ===
Pos	Athlete	SLO (Slovenia)	CZE (Czech Republic)	GER (Germany)	FRA (France)	ESP (Spain)	Points
1	Jessica Fox (AUS)	2	1	16	1	1	322
2	Camille Prigent (FRA)	7	9	2	18	2	266
3	Maialen Chourraut (ESP)	3	6	5	29	6	227
4	Klaudia Zwolińska (POL)	38	2	3	3	14	215
5	Ana Sátila (BRA)		13	7	8	5	196
6	Kateřina Beková (CZE)	14	14	10	10	13	126
7	Eva Alina Hočevar (SLO)	1	44	8	9	20	182
8	Emma Vuitton (FRA)	5	4	12	6	28	181
9	Soňa Stanovská (SVK)	15	12	24	21	7	178
10	Zuzana Paňková (SVK)	36	3	13	7	16	176

=== Kayak cross men ===
Pos	Athlete	SLO (Slovenia)	CZE (Czech Republic)	GER (Germany)	FRA (France)	ESP (Spain)	Points
1	Jan Rohrer (SUI)	6	7	9	5	3	224
2	Joseph Clarke (GBR)	3	14	1	1	25	187
3	Giovanni De Gennaro (ITA)	10	13	13	6	4	164
4	Mathurin Madoré (FRA)	9	3	34	3	9	159
5	Manuel Ochoa (ESP)		10	17	13	1	152
6	Joris Hello (FRA)	2	8	26	2	62	143
7	Finn Butcher (NZL)	19	12	27	17	2	135
8	David Llorente (ESP)	4	18	2	9	57	127
9	Žiga Lin Hočevar (SLO)	1	4	11	60	43	126
10	Gabriel De Coster (BEL)		20	3	14	8	113

=== Kayak cross women ===
Pos	Athlete	SLO (Slovenia)	CZE (Czech Republic)	GER (Germany)	FRA (France)	ESP (Spain)	Points
1	Camille Prigent (FRA)	25	1	9	1	4	233
2	Kimberley Woods (GBR)	4	8		5	1	230
2	Ricarda Funk (GER)		3	4	2	5	230
4	Alena Marx (SUI)	1	6	3	7	9	213
5	Evy Leibfarth (USA)	7	4	2	4	10	209
6	Tereza Kneblová (CZE)	21	10	1	14	2	200
7	Klaudia Zwolińska (POL)	26	2	5	6	13	156
8	Marjorie Delassus (FRA)	8	5	30	9	7	148
9	Lois Leaver (GBR)	30	25	6	3	12	119
10	Viktoriia Us (UKR)	2	23	49	22	8	115

=== Kayak cross individual men ===
Pos	Athlete	SLO (Slovenia)	CZE (Czech Republic)	GER (Germany)	FRA (France)	ESP (Spain)	Points
1	Joseph Clarke (GBR)	4	2	10	1	1	315
2	Sam Leaver (GBR)	1	7	12	5	6	259
3	Manuel Ochoa (ESP)		23	1	2	2	244
4	Giovanni De Gennaro (ITA)	9	1	3	15	16	228
5	Mathurin Madoré (FRA)	2	4	34	7	8	219
6	Lucien Delfour (AUS)	8	8	18	9	13	197
6	Jan Rohrer (SUI)	22	10	5	4	17	197
8	Finn Butcher (NZL)	10	27	17	12	7	182
9	Matyáš Novák (CZE)		9	52	8	3	176
10	Jakub Krejčí (CZE)	3	15	7	14	56	151

=== Kayak cross individual women ===
Pos	Athlete	SLO (Slovenia)	CZE (Czech Republic)	GER (Germany)	FRA (France)	ESP (Spain)	Points
1	Marjorie Delassus (FRA)	14	3	27	2	1	265
2	Tereza Kneblová (CZE)	27	5	2	8	2	258
3	Angèle Hug (FRA)	2	16	13	7	3	252
4	Lois Leaver (GBR)	18	6	12	1	6	242
5	Klaudia Zwolińska (POL)	5	8	10	17	4	234
6	Evy Leibfarth (USA)	9	11	3	6	10	228
7	Kateřina Beková (CZE)	4	1	5	11	24	216
8	Ricarda Funk (GER)		2	1	15	9	215
9	Camille Prigent (FRA)	1	4	4	5	29	210
10	Alena Marx (SUI)	28	25	8	10	5	184

== Points ==
- World Cup points were awarded based on the results of each race at each event as follows:

Position	1	2	3	4	5	6	7	8	9	10	11	12	13	14	15	16	17	18	19	20	21	22	23	24	25	26	27	28	29	30	31	32	33+
Slalom and KX individual	60	55	50	46	44	42	40	38	36	34	32	31	30	29	28	27	26	25	24	23	22	21	19	17	15	13	11	9	7	5	2	2	2
Kayak cross	60	55	50	45	40	35	30	25	19	17	15	13	11	9	7	5	4	4	4	4	4	4	4	4	4	4	4	4	4	4	4	4	2

== Results ==
=== World Cup Race 1 ===
29-31 May in Tacen, Slovenia

Event	Gold	Score	Silver	Score	Bronze	Score
C1 men	Žiga Lin Hočevar (SLO)	77.85	Václav Chaloupka (CZE)	80.60	Luka Božič (SLO)	80.90
C1 women	Tereza Kneblová (CZE)	84.27	Eva Alina Hočevar (SLO)	84.97	Alena Marx (SUI)	85.87
K1 men	Xabier Ferrazzi (ITA)	72.71	Michał Pasiut (POL)	75.11	Jakub Krejčí (CZE)	75.62
K1 women	Eva Alina Hočevar (SLO)	81.61	Jessica Fox (AUS)	81.74	Maialen Chourraut (ESP)	83.85
Kayak cross men	Žiga Lin Hočevar (SLO)		Joris Hello (FRA)		Joseph Clarke (GBR)	
Kayak cross women	Alena Marx (SUI)		Viktoriia Us (UKR)		Angèle Hug (FRA)	
Kayak cross individual men	Sam Leaver (GBR)	50.95	Mathurin Madoré (FRA)	51.94	Jakub Krejčí (CZE)	52.08
Kayak cross individual women	Camille Prigent (FRA)	56.06	Angèle Hug (FRA)	58.79	Kimberley Woods (GBR)	59.16

=== World Cup Race 2 ===
5-7 June in Prague, Czechia

Event	Gold	Score	Silver	Score	Bronze	Score
C1 men	Nicolas Gestin (FRA)	107.84	Marko Mirgorodský (SVK)	108.64	Adam Burgess (GBR)	109.20
C1 women	Jessica Fox (AUS)	121.01	Martina Satková (CZE)	121.28	Kimberley Woods (GBR)	123.02
K1 men	Jakub Krejčí (CZE)	98.10	Joseph Clarke (GBR)	99.87	Xabier Ferrazzi (ITA)	101.76
K1 women	Jessica Fox (AUS)	108.84	Klaudia Zwolińska (POL)	111.30	Zuzana Paňková (SVK)	112.75
Kayak cross men	Jakub Krejčí (CZE)		Vít Přindiš (CZE)		Mathurin Madoré (FRA)	
Kayak cross women	Camille Prigent (FRA)		Klaudia Zwolińska (POL)		Ricarda Funk (GER)	
Kayak cross individual men	Giovanni De Gennaro (ITA)	63.56	Joseph Clarke (GBR)	63.67	Marten Konrad (GER)	64.08
Kayak cross individual women	Kateřina Beková (CZE)	67.72	Ricarda Funk (GER)	67.79	Marjorie Delassus (FRA)	68.70

=== World Cup Race 3 ===
12-14 June in Augsburg, Germany

Event	Gold	Score	Silver	Score	Bronze	Score
C1 men	Raffaello Ivaldi (ITA)	97.51	Adam Burgess (GBR)	97.58	Matej Beňuš (SVK)	99.16
C1 women	Jessica Fox (AUS)	107.93	Núria Vilarrubla (ESP)	110.27	Martina Satková (CZE)	110.28
K1 men	Jakub Krejčí (CZE)	88.81	Giovanni De Gennaro (ITA)	90.77	Xabier Ferrazzi (ITA)	90.96
K1 women	Ricarda Funk (GER)	98.68	Camille Prigent (FRA)	99.83	Klaudia Zwolińska (POL)	101.34
Kayak cross men	Joseph Clarke (GBR)		David Llorente (ESP)		Gabriel De Coster (BEL)	
Kayak cross women	Tereza Kneblová (CZE)		Evy Leibfarth (USA)		Alena Marx (SUI)	
Kayak cross individual men	Manuel Ochoa (ESP)	65.05	Egor Smirnov (AIN)	65.09	Giovanni De Gennaro (ITA)	65.56
Kayak cross individual women	Ricarda Funk (GER)	69.70	Tereza Kneblová (CZE)	69.72	Evy Leibfarth (USA)	69.80

=== World Cup Race 4 ===
3-5 September in Vaires-sur-Marne, France

This was the second of 9 stages in the qualification for the 2028 Summer Olympics.

Event	Gold	Score	Silver	Score	Bronze	Score
C1 men	Václav Chaloupka (CZE)	94.94	Žiga Lin Hočevar (SLO)	95.10	Ryan Westley (GBR)	97.01
C1 women	Zuzana Paňková (SVK)	111.85	Eva Alina Hočevar (SLO)	113.59	Marta Bertoncelli (ITA)	114.48
K1 men	Giovanni De Gennaro (ITA)	87.95	Titouan Castryck (FRA)	90.52	Martin Cornu (FRA)	90.67
K1 women	Jessica Fox (AUS)	102.88	Eliška Mintálová (SVK)	103.61	Klaudia Zwolińska (POL)	105.20
Kayak cross men	Joseph Clarke (GBR)		Joris Hello (FRA)		Mathurin Madoré (FRA)	
Kayak cross women	Camille Prigent (FRA)		Ricarda Funk (GER)		Lois Leaver (GBR)	
Kayak cross individual men	Joseph Clarke (GBR)	55.33	Manuel Ochoa (ESP)	55.66	Gabriel De Coster (BEL)	55.87
Kayak cross individual women	Lois Leaver (GBR)	60.38	Marjorie Delassus (FRA)	60.58	Kimberley Woods (GBR)	60.98

=== World Cup Final ===
10-13 September in La Seu, Spain

A different progression system was used for the World Cup Final. In classic slalom event, top 30 from a single qualification run qualified for the semifinal and then top 12 from the semifinal advanced to the final. In kayak cross, the knockout phase featured a repechage round for those eliminated in round 1. Double points were awarded for each race.

This was the third of 9 stages in the qualification for the 2028 Summer Olympics.

Event	Gold	Score	Silver	Score	Bronze	Score
C1 men	Miquel Travé (ESP)	89.08	Žiga Lin Hočevar (SLO)	89.43	Nicolas Gestin (FRA)	91.14
C1 women	Ana Sátila (BRA)	103.85	Miren Lazkano (ESP)	104.55	Tereza Kneblová (CZE)	104.64
K1 men	Titouan Castryck (FRA)	81.80	Xabier Ferrazzi (ITA)	82.79	Giovanni De Gennaro (ITA)	84.16
K1 women	Jessica Fox (AUS)	93.77	Camille Prigent (FRA)	94.49	Mònica Dòria (AND)	96.44
Kayak cross men	Manuel Ochoa (ESP)		Finn Butcher (NZL)		Jan Rohrer (SUI)	
Kayak cross women	Kimberley Woods (GBR)		Tereza Kneblová (CZE)		Mònica Dòria (AND)	
Kayak cross individual men	Joseph Clarke (GBR)	45.91	Manuel Ochoa (ESP)	46.43	Matyáš Novák (CZE)	46.86
Kayak cross individual women	Marjorie Delassus (FRA)	50.24	Tereza Kneblová (CZE)	50.76	Angèle Hug (FRA)	51.60
