= 2026 Paddle Europe Slalom Championships =

- Venue: Ivrea Whitewater Stadium
- Location: Ivrea, Italy
- Dates: 24 to 26 September

The 2026 Paddle Europe Slalom Championships took place from 24 to 26 September in Ivrea, Italy under the auspices of Paddle Europe. It was the 27th edition of the competition formerly known as the European Canoe Slalom Championships, and the first under the new title. Ivrea hosted the event for the second time after the 2021 edition.

== Medal table ==
* Host nation (Italy)

Rank	Nation	Gold	Silver	Bronze	Total
1	France	3	4	2	9
2	Czech Republic	3	3	1	7
3	Italy*	2	3	4	9
4	Great Britain	2	1	2	5
5	Poland	1	1	1	3
6	Slovakia	1	0	0	1
7	Germany	0	0	1	1
7	Spain	0	0	1	1
Totals (8 entries)		12	12	12	36

== Medal summary ==
=== Men ===
==== Canoe ====
Event	Gold		Silver		Bronze	
C1	Yohann Senechault; France	90.26	Lukáš Kratochvíl; Czech Republic	91.70	Elio Maiutto; Italy	92.45
C1 team	France; Nicolas Gestin; Yohann Senechault; Jules Bernardet	90.64	Czech Republic; Václav Chaloupka; Lukáš Kratochvíl; Lukáš Rohan	91.29	Italy; Raffaello Ivaldi; Flavio Micozzi; Elio Maiutto	92.09

==== Kayak ====
Event	Gold		Silver		Bronze	
K1	Jakub Krejčí; Czech Republic	82.41	Xabier Ferrazzi; Italy	84.38	Giovanni De Gennaro; Italy	85.33
K1 team	France; Titouan Castryck; Anatole Delassus; Martin Cornu	86.30	Czech Republic; Jakub Krejčí; Jiří Prskavec; Matyáš Novák	86.88	Great Britain; Joseph Clarke; Sam Leaver; Ben Haylett	86.98
Kayak cross individual	Giovanni De Gennaro; Italy	43.29	Mathurin Madoré; France	43.41	Manuel Ochoa; Spain	43.90
Kayak cross	Matyáš Novák; Czech Republic		Mathurin Madoré; France		Ianis Triomphe; France	

=== Women ===
==== Canoe ====
Event	Gold		Silver		Bronze	
C1	Mallory Franklin; Great Britain	100.47	Doriane Delassus; France	100.50	Tereza Kneblová; Czech Republic	100.93
C1 team	Italy; Marta Bertoncelli; Elena Borghi; Elena Micozzi	102.54	France; Angèle Hug; Doriane Delassus; Marjorie Delassus	102.88	Great Britain; Kimberley Woods; Mallory Franklin; Ellis Miller	109.33

==== Kayak ====
Event	Gold		Silver		Bronze	
K1	Klaudia Zwolińska; Poland	94.69	Lucia Pistoni; Italy	95.68	Emily Apel; Germany	95.90
K1 team	Slovakia; Eliška Mintálová; Zuzana Paňková; Soňa Stanovská	97.06	Italy; Stefanie Horn; Agata Spagnol; Lucia Pistoni	98.34	France; Emma Vuitton; Camille Prigent; Marjorie Delassus	98.79
Kayak cross individual	Kimberley Woods; Great Britain	48.02	Klaudia Zwolińska; Poland	48.66	Lucia Pistoni; Italy	48.76
Kayak cross	Tereza Kneblová; Czech Republic		Mallory Franklin; Great Britain		Klaudia Zwolińska; Poland	
