= 2021 ICF Canoe Slalom World Championships – Men's extreme slalom =

World championship canoeing event

Men's extreme slalom at the 2021 ICF Canoe Slalom World Championships
- Venue: Čunovo Water Sports Centre
- Location: Bratislava, Slovakia
- Dates: 24–26 September 2021
- Competitors: 82 from 34 nations

Medalists
gold medal	Joe Clarke	Great Britain
silver medal	Finn Butcher	New Zealand
bronze medal	Mario Leitner	Austria

The men's extreme slalom at the 2021 ICF Canoe Slalom World Championships took place on 24 and 26 September 2021 at the Čunovo Water Sports Centre in Bratislava. It was the 4th edition of the event, after it made its debut in 2017 in Pau. 82 athletes from 34 nations competed.

The event was won by Joe Clarke of Great Britain, 2016 Olympic Champion in K1, securing his fourth medal at World Championship level and first individual gold. Finn Butcher of New Zealand won silver, his first medal at this level, while Austrian World No. 1 Mario Leitner won bronze.

== Background ==
Stefan Hengst of Germany entered the event as the reigning world champion, a title he won in 2019 in Prague. Austria's Mario Leitner entered as the World No. 1, having finished third in the 2021 World Cup standings. The winner of the standings was Czech Vít Přindiš, who also entered as a favourite.

Participation in the event was the largest in history, leading into the events Olympic debut in 2024.

== Competition format ==
The men's extreme slalom event in canoe slalom is split into two phases - time trials and knockout-style heats. On the Friday, all athletes complete a timed run of the course alone and are seeded based on their performance, with those awarded faults ranked last. 32 athletes progress to the heats, with the advancing paddlers selected first by National Federation, and then time. That is, if there are 32 or more competing federations, only the fastest athlete from each of the 32 fastest federations will advance. If there are less than 32 federations competing, the second fastest athletes from each federation will advance and so on until 32 positions are filled. A federation can enter a maximum of four boats in the time trials.

On Sunday, the advancing athletes are split into 8 heats of 4, arranged in an order specified by the rulebook (page 74). The heats and subsequent rounds involve head-to-head racing of 4 boats on the course, where paddlers must navigate 2 upstream gates, a series of downstream gates and perform a complete eskimo roll. The athletes select their positions in the start ramp, with preference given in the order which they were seeded by the time trials. The highest two ranked athletes in each heat progress to the quarter-finals, then to the semifinal and final. Whichever athlete is ranked first in the final is awarded gold. Athletes can be penalised in three ways in each round, by receiving a fault (FLT), being a ranked last finisher (RLF), or by not finishing (DNF). Faults are incurred for false starts, missing gates or failing to correctly perform a 360-degree roll. Athletes are ranked last (RLF) if they breach the safety requirements of the competition, such as by holding back another athlete with their hands or paddle, deliberately paddling over another athlete's boat, or by making dangerous contact with another athlete's head or body - all other non-dangerous contact is allowed. In each round athletes are ranked first by the order in which they cross the finish line, with those incurring penalties ranked in the following order: FLT, RLF, DNF, DNS.

The final classification of athletes is determined in the following manner: Athletes eliminated at any phase of the competition will be given their rank based on the comparison of the time trial times of athletes eliminated at the same phase. All 3rd ranked athletes will be ranked above all 4th ranked athletes. The final rank of athletes who did not progress to the heats is determined by their time trial results.

== Schedule ==
All times are Central European Summer Time (UTC+2)

Date	Time	Round
Friday, 24 September 2021
Friday, 24 September 2021	14:47	Time Trials
Sunday, 26 September 2021
Sunday, 26 September 2021	15:54	Heats
Sunday, 26 September 2021	16:51	Quarterfinal
Sunday, 26 September 2021	17:18	Semifinals
Sunday, 26 September 2021	17:35	Final

== Results ==
=== Time Trials ===
World Cup overall winner Vít Přindiš of the Czech Republic was fastest in the time trials with a time of 54.99 ahead of Italian Giovanni De Gennaro. With 32 National Federations making the start, all were permitted 1 starter only in the heats. The fastest non-qualifiers were Benjamin Renia of France (7th) and Joe Clarke of Great Britain (10th). However, the qualifying athletes from Australia and South Africa scratched from the heats, allowing both to progress - Vavřinec Hradilek of the Czech Republic in 11th was then the fastest non-qualifier. Hradilek and Clarke set identical times of 55.92, with Clarke favoured due to his higher world ranking. Hengst and De Dionigi also failed to progress, guaranteeing a first-time World Champion in this event. The top ten in the time trials were as follows:

Rank	Bib	Canoeist	Nation	Time
1	108	Vít Přindiš	Czech Republic	54.99
2	116	Giovanni De Gennaro	Italy	55.03
3	102	Boris Neveu	France	55.16
4	101	Mario Leitner	Austria	55.27
5	125	Bradley Forbes-Cryans	Great Britain	55.55
6	103	Joan Crespo	Spain	55.69
7	127	Benjamin Renia	France	55.74
8	142	Dimitri Marx	Switzerland	55.74
9	130	Pedro Gonçalves	Brazil	55.80
10	119	Joe Clarke	Great Britain	55.92

=== Knockout rounds ===
Top Half

Heats
1; 16	(Czech Republic) Vít Přindiš (Slovenia) Vid Kuder Marusic	1; 2
17; 32	(United States) Kaelin Friedenson (Greece) Grigorios Komninos	3 DNF
8; 9	(Switzerland) Dimitri Marx (Brazil) Pedro Gonçalves	1; 2
25; 24	(Morocco) Nour Ait Kaddour (Republic of Ireland) Alistair McCreery	3 FLT
5; 12	(United Kingdom) B. Forbes-Cryans (New Zealand) Finn Butcher	1; 2
28; 21	(Kenya) Samuel Muturi (Netherlands) Joris Otten	3; 4
13; 4	(Slovakia) Jakub Grigar (Austria) Mario Leitner	1; 2
20; 29	(Chile) A. Echeverria Olguin (Romania) Patrick Kozma	3; 4

Quarterfinals
8; 9	(Switzerland) Dimitri Marx (Brazil) Pedro Gonçalves	1; 2
16; 1	(Slovenia) Vid Kuder Marusic (Czech Republic) Vít Přindiš	3; 4
4; 12	(Austria) Mario Leitner (New Zealand) Finn Butcher	1; 2
13; 5	(Slovakia) Jakub Grigar (United Kingdom) B. Forbes-Cryans	3 FLT

Semifinal
4; 12	(Austria) Mario Leitner (New Zealand) Finn Butcher	1; 2
9; 8	(Brazil) Pedro Gonçalves (Switzerland) Dimitri Marx	3 RLF

Bottom Half

Heats
14; 19	(Poland) Michał Pasiut (Canada) Trevor Boyd	1; 2
3; 30	(France) Boris Neveu (Latvia) Martins Plaudis	3 FLT
6; 11	(Spain) Joan Crespo; Nikita Gubenko	1; 2
22; 27	(Kazakhstan) Martin Stanovsky (Senegal) Jean-Pierre Bourhis	3 FLT
10; 7	(United Kingdom) Joe Clarke (France) Benjamin Renia	1; 2
23; 26	(Japan) Kazuya Adachi (Uzbekistan) B. Mirzakhamdamov	FLT; FLT
15; 2	(Germany) Hannes Aigner (Italy) G. De Gennaro	1; 2
18; 31	(Sweden) Fredrik Wahlen (Singapore) Jun Yi Ong	3; 4

Quarterfinals
14; 19	(Poland) Michał Pasiut (Canada) Trevor Boyd	1; 2
11; 6	Nikita Gubenko (Spain) Joan Crespo	3 FLT
10; 7	(United Kingdom) Joe Clarke (France) Benjamin Renia	1; 2
15; 1	(Germany) Hannes Aigner (Italy) G. De Gennaro	3; 4

Semifinal
10; 14	(United Kingdom) Joe Clarke (Poland) Michał Pasiut	1; 2
19; 7	(Canada) Trevor Boyd (France) Benjamin Renia	3 FLT

=== Final ===
As the highest-seeded athlete, Mario Leitner chose the rightmost starting position. Clarke started in the leftmost position, Pasiut centre-left and Butcher centre-right. Clarke was fastest to the first set of upstreams and opted for the left one, while all other three went to the right. Butcher started slowest but successfully undercut Pasiut and Leitner in the first upstream. Clarke and Butcher opted for separate upstreams in the second set, with no change of lead. Butcher gained steadily in the final gates but could not overtake Clarke.

Joe Clarke won gold to 'resurrect' a disappointing weekend in his favoured K1 event, which saw him eliminated in the heats. Finn Butcher's silver was his first at Championship level, after he also won silver in the opening World Cup of 2021. Leitner's bronze was also his first world championship medal, while Pasiut achieved a career-best 4th. All competitors completed penalty-free runs.

10	(United Kingdom) Joe Clarke	1st place, gold medalist(s)
12	(New Zealand) Finn Butcher	2nd place, silver medalist(s)
4	(Austria) Mario Leitner	3rd place, bronze medalist(s)
14	(Poland) Michał Pasiut	4
