= Anatole Delassus =

French slalom canoeist

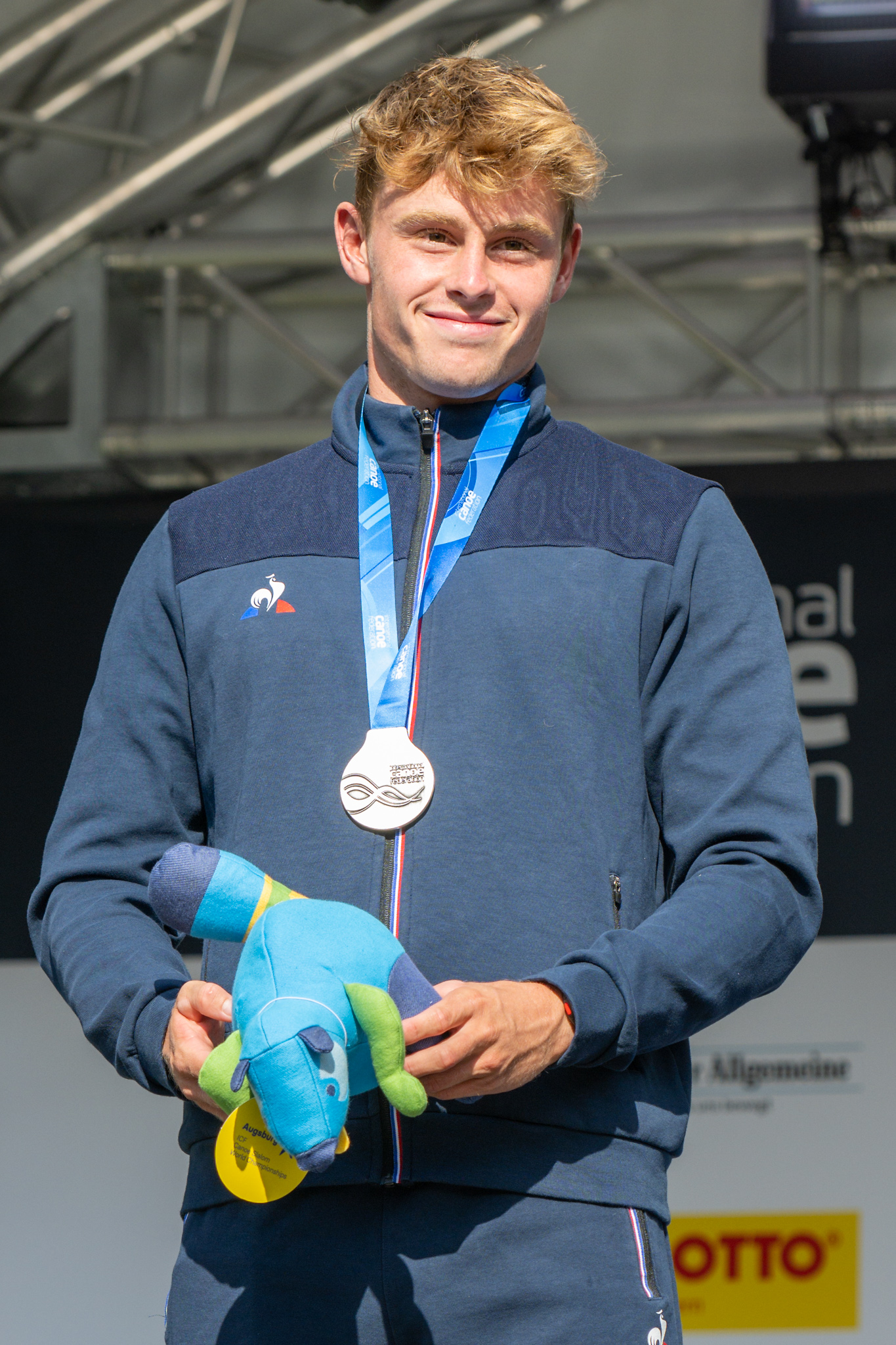

Personal information
- Nationality: French
- Born: 2001 (age 24–25)

Sport
- Country: France
- Sport: Canoe slalom
- Event: K1, Kayak cross
Medal record
Men's canoe slalom
Representing France
World Championships
Gold medal – first place	2025 Penrith	K1 team
Silver medal – second place	2022 Augsburg	Kayak cross
European Championships
Gold medal – first place	2026 Ivrea	K1 team
Silver medal – second place	2025 Vaires-sur-Marne	K1 team
Bronze medal – third place	2024 Tacen	K1 team
U23 World Championships
Gold medal – first place	2022 Ivrea	K1
Gold medal – first place	2023 Kraków	K1 team
Gold medal – first place	2024 Liptovský Mikuláš	K1
Gold medal – first place	2024 Liptovský Mikuláš	K1 team
Silver medal – second place	2021 Tacen	K1 team
Silver medal – second place	2023 Kraków	K1
Silver medal – second place	2024 Liptovský Mikuláš	Kayak cross
Bronze medal – third place	2022 Ivrea	K1 team
U23 European Championships
Gold medal – first place	2021 Solkan	K1 team
Gold medal – first place	2022 České Budějovice	K1 team
Gold medal – first place	2023 Bratislava	Kayak cross
Silver medal – second place	2021 Solkan	K1
Silver medal – second place	2022 České Budějovice	Kayak cross
Silver medal – second place	2023 Bratislava	K1 team
Silver medal – second place	2024 Kraków	K1 team
Bronze medal – third place	2024 Kraków	Kayak cross
Bronze medal – third place	2024 Kraków	Kayak cross individual
Junior World Championships
Gold medal – first place	2019 Kraków	K1
Gold medal – first place	2018 Ivrea	K1 team
Silver medal – second place	2018 Ivrea	K1
Junior European Championships
Gold medal – first place	2018 Bratislava	K1 team
Gold medal – first place	2019 Liptovský Mikuláš	K1

Anatole Delassus (born 2001) is a French slalom canoeist who has competed at the international level since 2018.

== Career ==
He won two medals at the World Championships with a gold in the K1 team event in 2025 and a silver in kayak cross in 2022. He also won one gold, one silver and one bronze medal in the K1 team event at the European Championships.

He is the overall World Cup champion in K1 from 2024.

== Personal life ==
His sisters, Marjorie and Doriane, are both also slalom canoeists.

== World Cup individual podiums ==
Season	Date	Venue	Position	Event
2022	26 June 2022	Tacen	3rd	Kayak cross
2023	18 June 2023	Tacen	2nd	Kayak cross
2023	3 September 2023	La Seu d'Urgell	3rd	Kayak cross
2024	14 September 2024	Ivrea	2nd	K1
2025	6 June 2025	La Seu d'Urgell	2nd	K1
2025	13 June 2025	Pau	2nd	K1
2025	28 June 2025	Prague	2nd	K1
2025	5 September 2025	Augsburg	1st	K1
