= 2025 Oceania Canoe Slalom Championships =

- Venue: Penrith Whitewater Stadium
- Location: Penrith, Australia
- Dates: 24–26 January

The 2025 Oceania Canoe Slalom Championships took place in Penrith, Australia from 24 to 26 January 2025 under the auspices of International Canoe Federation (ICF).

== Schedule ==
Date	Event
24 January	Heats: Session 1 WK1, MK1, WC1, MC1
25 January	Semi-finals / Finals: WK1, MK1, WC1, MC1
26 January	Kayak cross

== Medal summary ==
=== Men's ===
Event	Gold		Silver		Bronze	
C1	Tristan Carter; Australia	105.09	Kaylen Bassett; Australia	113.44	Benjamin Ross; Australia	120.07
K1	Finn Butcher; New Zealand	96.12	Lucien Delfour; Australia	96.32	Timothy Anderson; Australia	98.43
Kayak cross	Benjamin Ross; Australia		Lucien Delfour; Australia		Finn Butcher; New Zealand	

=== Women's ===
Event	Gold		Silver		Bronze	
C1	Jessica Fox; Australia	115.16	Noemie Fox; Australia	117.06	Kate Eckhardt; Australia	123.28
K1	Jessica Fox; Australia	104.41	Noemie Fox; Australia	110.02	Kate Eckhardt; Australia	112.24
Kayak cross	Noemie Fox; Australia		Jessica Fox; Australia		Codie Davidson; Australia	

== Medal table ==
* Host nation (Australia)

Rank	Nation	Gold	Silver	Bronze	Total
1	Australia*	5	6	5	16
2	New Zealand	1	0	1	2
Totals (2 entries)		6	6	6	18
