= Jakub Grigar =

Slovak slalom canoeist (born 1997)

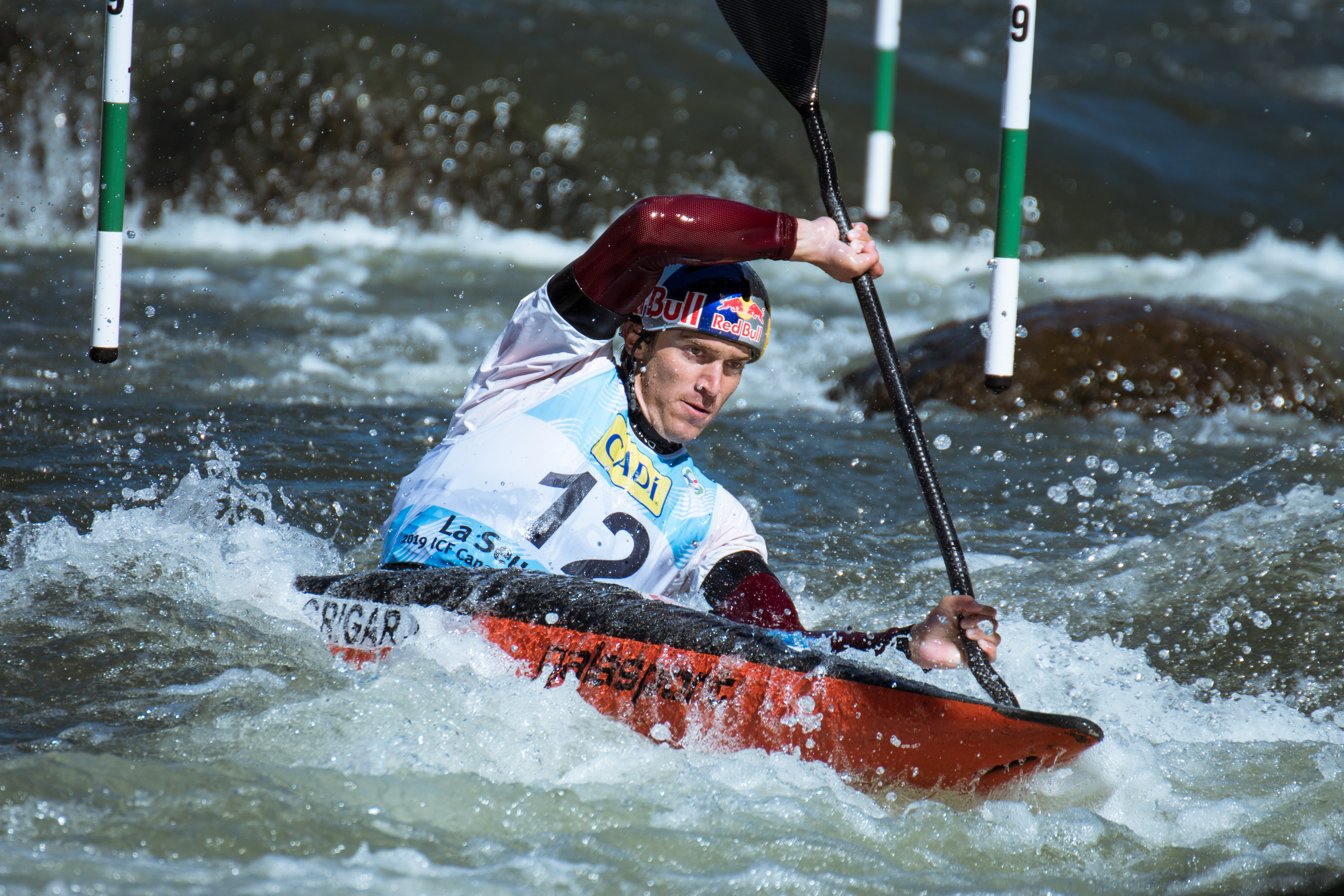
- Grigar during the 2019 Canoe slalom World Championships

Personal information
- Nationality: Slovak
- Born: 27 April 1997 (age 29) Liptovský Mikuláš, Slovakia
- Height: 1.83 m (6 ft 0 in)
- Weight: 81 kg (179 lb)

Sport
- Country: Slovakia
- Sport: Canoe slalom
- Event: K1, Kayak cross
- Club: Dukla Liptovský Mikuláš
Medal record
Men's canoe slalom
Representing Slovakia
Olympic Games
Silver medal – second place	2020 Tokyo	K1
World Championships
Silver medal – second place	2015 London	K1 team
Silver medal – second place	2021 Bratislava	K1 team
Youth Olympic Games
Silver medal – second place	2014 Nanjing	K1
U23 World Championships
Gold medal – first place	2016 Kraków	K1
Gold medal – first place	2017 Bratislava	K1
Silver medal – second place	2016 Kraków	K1 team
U23 European Championships
Gold medal – first place	2019 Liptovský Mikuláš	K1
Silver medal – second place	2018 Bratislava	K1
Silver medal – second place	2018 Bratislava	K1 team
Junior World Championships
Gold medal – first place	2013 Liptovský Mikuláš	K1
Gold medal – first place	2015 Foz do Iguaçu	K1
Silver medal – second place	2013 Liptovský Mikuláš	K1 team
Bronze medal – third place	2012 Wausau	K1
Bronze medal – third place	2014 Penrith	K1
Junior European Championships
Gold medal – first place	2013 Bourg-Saint-Maurice	K1
Gold medal – first place	2015 Kraków	K1 team

Jakub Grigar (born 27 April 1997) is a Slovak slalom canoeist who has competed at the international level since 2012. He specializes in the K1 discipline and occasionally competes in kayak cross.

Grigar competed at three Olympic Games. He finished 5th in the K1 event at the 2016 Summer Olympics in Rio de Janeiro and won the silver medal in the K1 event at the delayed 2020 Summer Olympics in Tokyo. He also competed at the 2024 Summer Olympics in Paris, finishing 6th in both the K1 event and kayak cross.

He also won two silver medals in the K1 team event at the ICF Canoe Slalom World Championships, earning them in 2015 and 2021.

== Career ==
=== Junior ===
Grigar first appeared at major junior events in 2012 (at age 15) and immediately had success, winning bronze in the K1 event at the World Junior Championships in Wausau. In four World Junior Championships he never finished outside of medals in the individual K1 event, winning 2 golds and 2 bronzes. He also won the K1 title at the 2013 European Championship and a silver at the 2014 Youth Olympic Games in Nanjing, which was raced on flatwater.

Grigar credits two-time Olympic Champion Elena Kaliská with helping him in his early years and showing him that canoe slalom is fun.

=== Under 23 ===
Grigar moved into the U23 category in 2016 as he aged out of the juniors and immediately won gold at the 2016 World Championships in the K1 event. He was able to defend that title one year later in Bratislava. He won silver and gold medals in the K1 event at the European U23 Championships, respectively in 2018 and 2019.

=== Senior ===
==== Early senior career ====
Grigar first qualified for the senior national team at the age of 16 in 2013, while still a junior. He made his debut at a major championship at the 2013 European Championships in Kraków where he finished 21st in K1 and 4th in the K1 team event. He also made his first appearance at the World Senior Championships later that year.

He won his first senior medal in 2015 in the K1 team event at the World Championships alongside Martin Halčin and Andrej Málek. His first individual medal came a year later at the World Cup in La Seu d'Urgell, where he finished second only to Vít Přindiš.

He qualified for the 2016 Summer Olympics in Rio de Janeiro, beating his more experienced teammates Halčin and Málek in the internal qualification. Having finished 4th in the heats and then winning the semifinal run, he was the last man to start in the final. He led at the final split in the final run, but then lost time on the last couple of gates and ultimately missed out on the gold medal by 0.90 seconds, finishing in 5th place.

The Olympic season was followed by three years (2017-2019) where his results had dropped off at the senior level as he was unable to get on the podium in any of the major events (World Championships, World Cups, European Championships). He skipped the entire 2020 season along with the whole Slovak national team due to the COVID-19 pandemic.

==== 2021: Back to form and 2020 Summer Olympics ====
Returning to his best form in 2021, Griger claimed his first World Cup victory in Markkleeberg in June, en route to a silver medal at the delayed 2020 Summer Olympics in Tokyo. He was also part of the silver medal winning K1 team at the 2021 ICF Canoe Slalom World Championships with Martin Halčin and Adam Gonšenica.

In the following season, Grigar won a bronze medal at the World Cup in Tacen and just missed out on a medal at the 2022 World Championships, where he finished 4th in the K1 event.

2023 did not yield any medals for Grigar, but he did manage to qualify for his third Olympics, beating Martin Halčin by a single point in the internal qualification.

== Career statistics ==
=== Major championships results timeline ===
Event		2013	2014	2015	2016	2017	2018	2019	2020	2021	2022	2023	2024	2025
Olympic Games	K1	Not held			5	Not held				2	Not held		6	Not held
Olympic Games	Kayak cross	Not held											6	Not held
World Championships	K1	50	—	41	Not held	16	17	10	Not held	7	4	19	Not held	28
World Championships	Kayak cross	Not held				—	—	—	Not held	10	51	76	Not held	14
World Championships	Kayak cross individual	Not held												4
World Championships	K1 team	17	—	2	Not held	8	15	24	Not held	2	5	5	Not held	4
European Championships	K1	21	—	39	5	8	28	33	—	34	12	6 (Note: 2023 European Games)	—	6
European Championships	Kayak cross	Not held								—	4	51	—	NQ
European Championships	Kayak cross individual	Not held											—	52
European Championships	K1 team	4	—	4	8	12	7	12	—	5	4	9	—	9

=== World Cup individual podiums ===
Season	Date	Venue	Position	Event
2016	11 Jun 2016	La Seu d'Urgell	2nd	K1
2021	19 Jun 2021	Markkleeberg	1st	K1
2022	25 June 2022	Tacen	3rd	K1
