= Mathurin Madoré =

French slalom canoeist

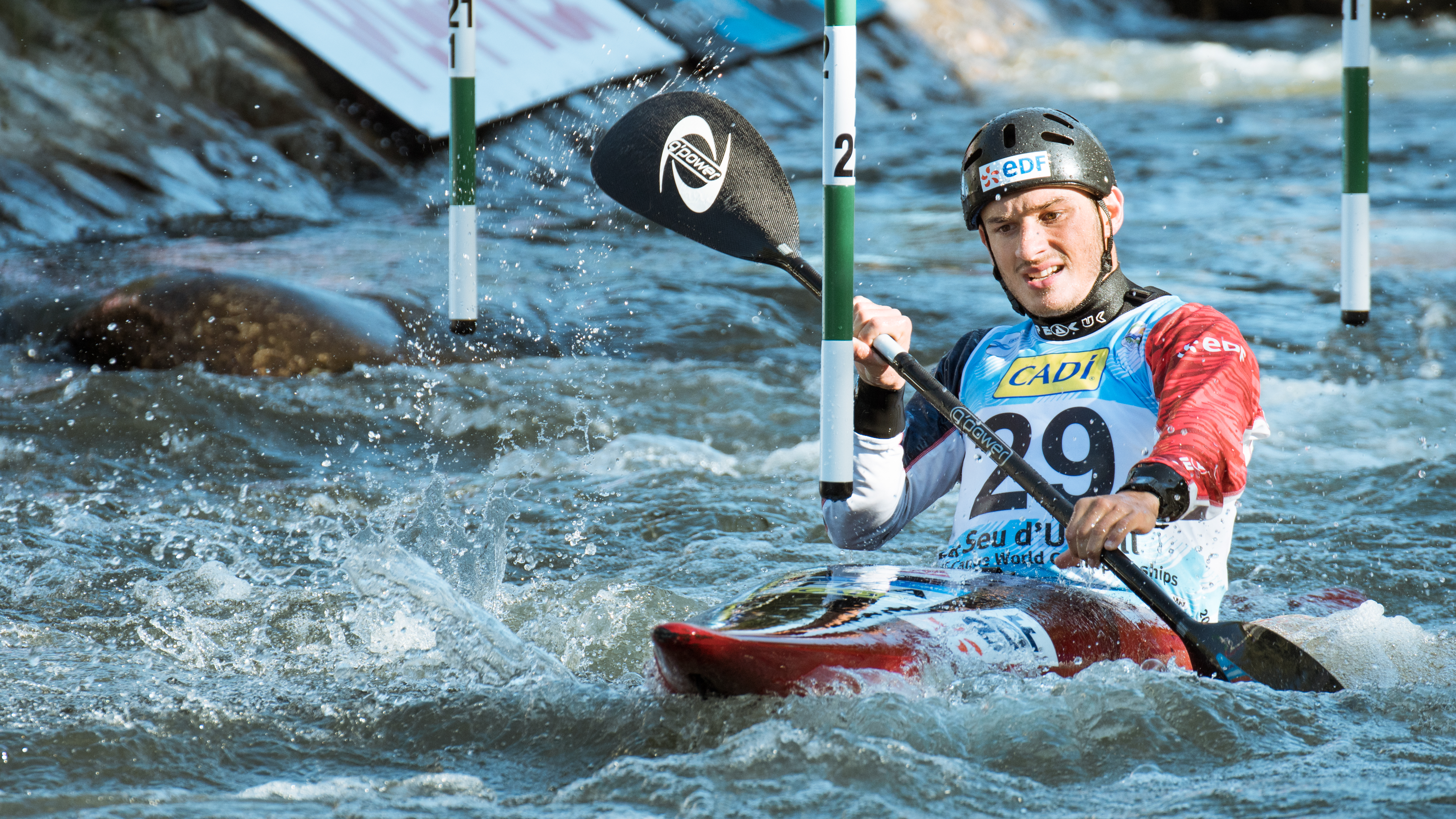

Personal information
- Nationality: French
- Born: 12 June 1996 (age 30)

Sport
- Country: France
- Sport: Canoe slalom
- Event: K1, Kayak cross
Medal record
Men's canoe slalom
Representing France
World Championships
Silver medal – second place	2025 Penrith	Kayak cross
European Championships
Gold medal – first place	2020 Prague	K1 team
Silver medal – second place	2025 Vaires-sur-Marne	Kayak cross individual
Silver medal – second place	2026 Ivrea	Kayak cross
Silver medal – second place	2026 Ivrea	Kayak cross individual
U23 World Championships
Gold medal – first place	2018 Ivrea	K1 team
Gold medal – first place	2019 Kraków	K1 team
Silver medal – second place	2019 Kraków	K1
Bronze medal – third place	2017 Bratislava	K1 team
U23 European Championships
Gold medal – first place	2017 Hohenlimburg	K1 team
Gold medal – first place	2019 Liptovský Mikuláš	K1 team

Mathurin Madoré (born 12 June 1996) is a French slalom canoeist who has competed at the international level since 2014, specializing in K1 and kayak cross.

He won a silver medal in kayak cross at the 2025 ICF Canoe Slalom World Championships in Penrith.

He also won four medals (1 gold and 3 silvers) at the European Championships.

== World Cup individual podiums ==
Season	Date	Venue	Position	Event
2024	2 June 2024	Augsburg	1st	Kayak cross
2024	16 June 2024	Kraków	3rd	Kayak cross
2025	15 June 2025	Pau	3rd	Kayak cross
2025	29 June 2025	Prague	3rd	Kayak cross individual
2025	31 August 2025	Tacen	1st	Kayak cross
2025	7 September 2025	Augsburg	1st	Kayak cross individual
2026	31 May 2026	Tacen	2nd	Kayak cross individual
2026	7 June 2026	Prague	3rd	Kayak cross
2026	5 September 2026	Vaires-sur-Marne	3rd	Kayak cross
