= Jonny Dickson =

British slalom canoeist (born 2001)

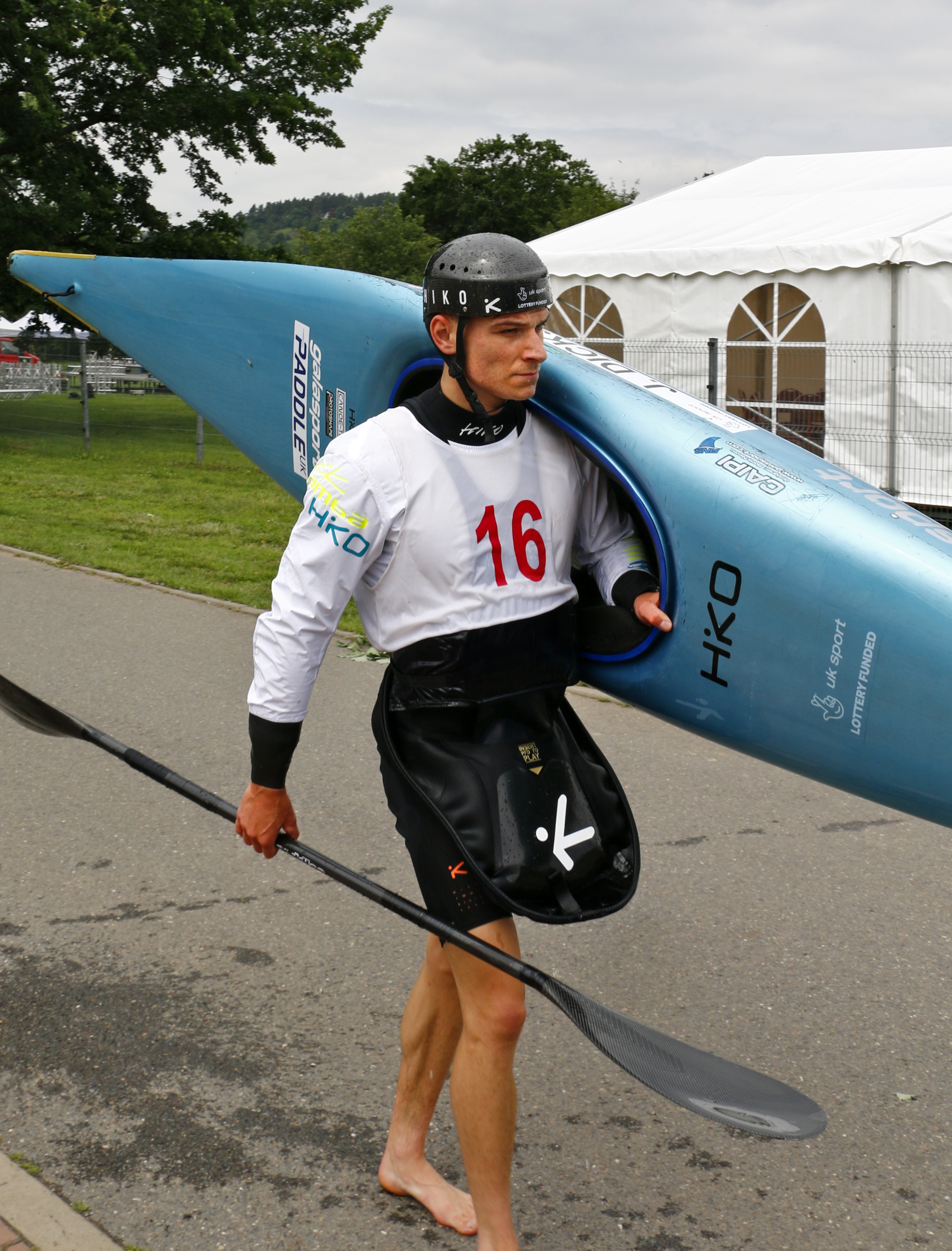

Personal information
- Nationality: British
- Born: 9 April 2001 (age 25)

Sport
- Country: Great Britain
- Sport: Canoe slalom
- Event: K1, Kayak cross
Medal record
Men's canoe slalom
Representing the United Kingdom
World Championships
Bronze medal – third place	2025 Penrith	K1 team
European Championships
Silver medal – second place	2024 Tacen	Kayak cross individual
U23 World Championships
Silver medal – second place	2021 Tacen	K1
Silver medal – second place	2024 Liptovský Mikuláš	K1 team
Bronze medal – third place	2022 Ivrea	K1
Bronze medal – third place	2023 Kraków	Kayak cross
U23 European Championships
Gold medal – first place	2024 Kraków	K1 team
Bronze medal – third place	2022 České Budějovice	K1 team
Junior World Championships
Gold medal – first place	2019 Kraków	K1 team

Jonny Dickson (born 9 April 2001) is a British slalom canoeist who has competed at the international level since 2017, specializing in K1 and kayak cross events.

He won a bronze medal in the K1 team event at the 2025 World Championships in Penrith. He also won a silver medal in kayak cross individual at the 2024 European Championships in Tacen.

Dickson won the overall World Cup title in kayak cross in 2025.

== World Cup individual podiums ==
Season	Date	Venue	Position	Event
2023	7 October 2023	Vaires-sur-Marne	2nd	K1
2024	15 September 2024	Ivrea	1st	Kayak cross
2025	8 June 2025	La Seu d'Urgell	1st	Kayak cross individual
2025	8 June 2025	La Seu d'Urgell	2nd	Kayak cross
2025	7 September 2025	Augsburg	2nd	Kayak cross
