= Yusuke Muto =

Japanese slalom canoeist

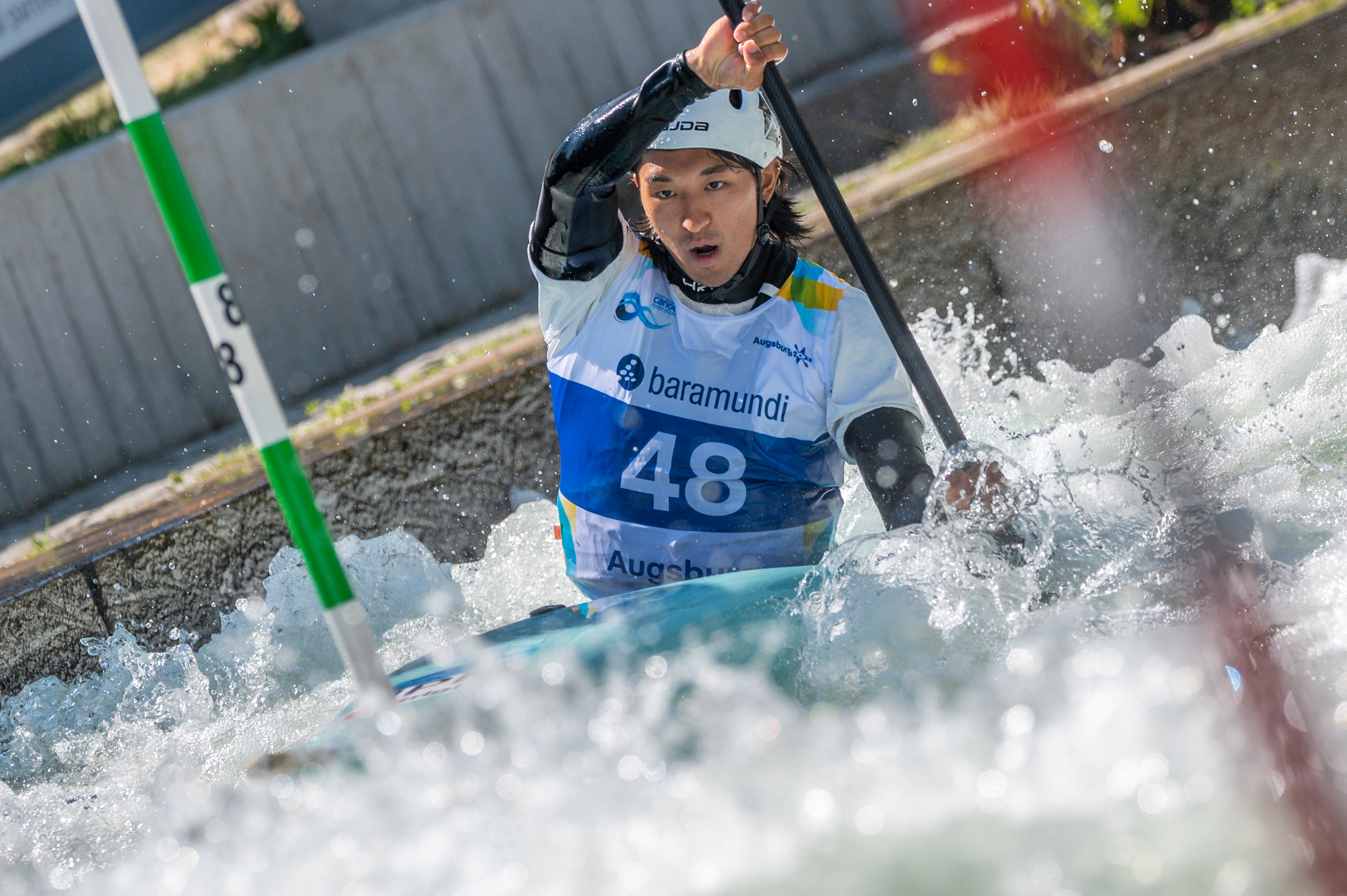

Personal information
- Nationality: Japanese
- Born: 29 August 2001 (age 24)

Sport
- Country: Japan
- Sport: Canoe slalom
- Event: K1, Kayak cross
Medal record
Men's canoe slalom
Representing Japan
World Championships
Silver medal – second place	2025 Penrith	K1 team
Asian Championships
Gold medal – first place	2023 Tokyo	K1 team

Yusuke Muto (born 29 August 2001) is a Japanese slalom canoeist who has competed at the international level since 2016, specializing in K1 and kayak cross.

He won a silver medal in the K1 team event at the 2025 World Championships in Penrith. It was the first ever medal for Japan at the ICF Canoe Slalom World Championships.
