= Joe Clarke (canoeist) =

British slalom canoeist

Joseph Clarke MBE
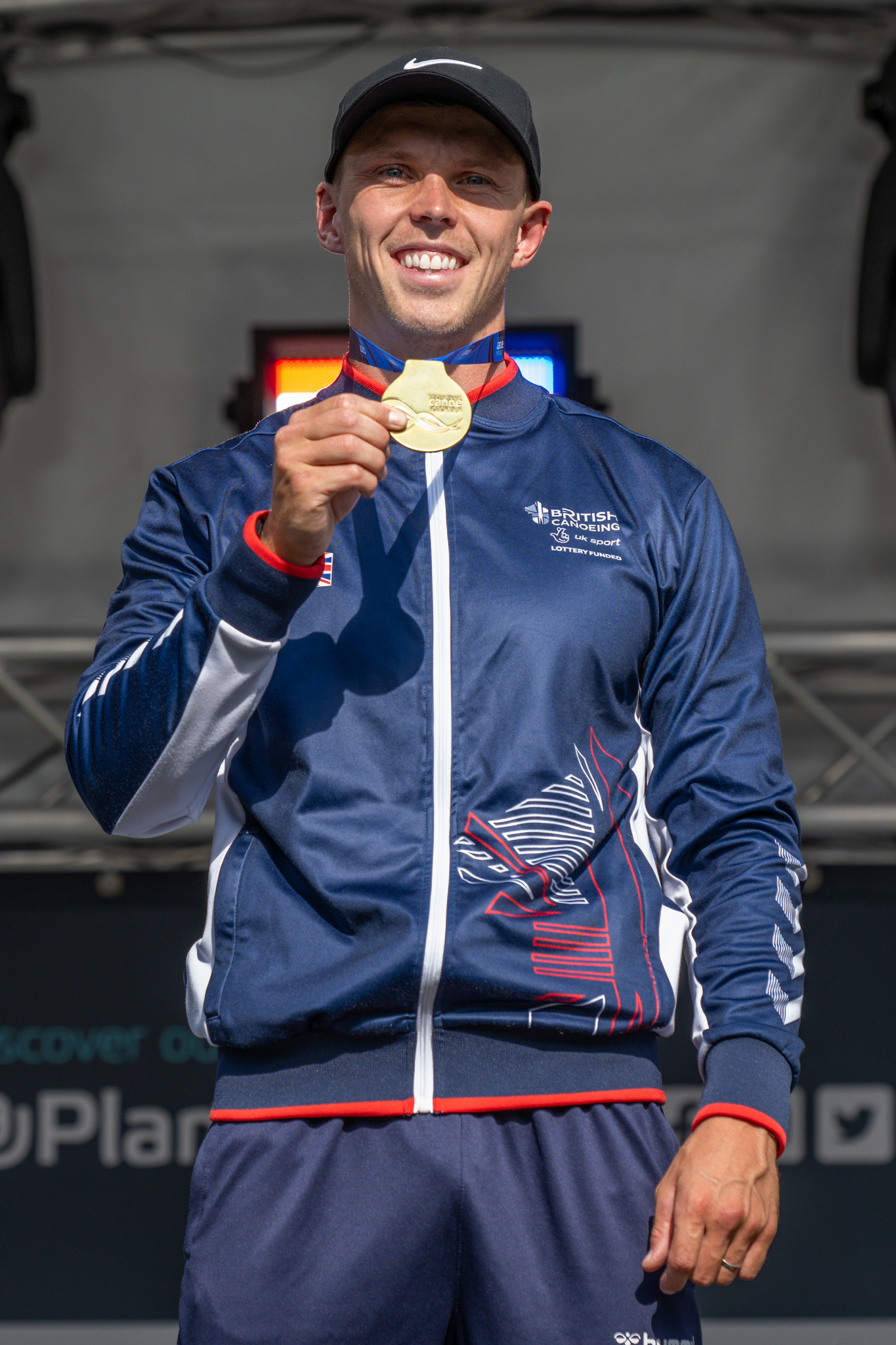
- Clarke at the 2022 Canoe Slalom World Championships

Personal information
- Full name: Joseph Clarke
- Nationality: British
- Born: 3 November 1992 (age 33) Stoke-on-Trent, Staffordshire, England
- Education: Alleyne's Academy
- Height: 182 cm (6 ft 0 in)
- Weight: 75 kg (165 lb)

Sport
- Country: Great Britain
- Sport: Canoe slalom
- Event: K1, Kayak cross
- Club: Stafford & Stone Canoe Club
Medal record
Men's canoe slalom
Representing Great Britain
Event	1st	2nd	3rd
Olympic Games	1	1	0
World Championships	7	2	3
European Championships	1	2	4
U23 World Championships	0	2	0
U23 European Championships	0	1	0
Junior European Championships	0	2	0
Total	9	10	7
Olympic Games
Gold medal – first place	2016 Rio de Janeiro	K1
Silver medal – second place	2024 Paris	Kayak cross
World Championships
Gold medal – first place	2018 Rio de Janeiro	K1 team
Gold medal – first place	2021 Bratislava	Kayak cross
Gold medal – first place	2022 Augsburg	Kayak cross
Gold medal – first place	2023 London	K1
Gold medal – first place	2023 London	Kayak cross
Gold medal – first place	2025 Penrith	Kayak cross
Gold medal – first place	2026 Oklahoma City	Kayak cross individual
Silver medal – second place	2022 Augsburg	K1 team
Silver medal – second place	2025 Penrith	Kayak cross individual
Bronze medal – third place	2014 Deep Creek Lake	K1 team
Bronze medal – third place	2015 London	K1 team
Bronze medal – third place	2025 Penrith	K1 team
European Games
Bronze medal – third place	2023 Kraków	K1
European Championships
Gold medal – first place	2024 Tacen	Kayak cross
Silver medal – second place	2014 Vienna	K1 team
Silver medal – second place	2015 Markkleeberg	K1 team
Bronze medal – third place	2021 Ivrea	K1 team
Bronze medal – third place	2021 Ivrea	Kayak cross
Bronze medal – third place	2026 Ivrea	K1 team
U23 World Championships
Silver medal – second place	2013 Liptovský Mikuláš	K1 team
Silver medal – second place	2014 Penrith	K1 team
U23 European Championships
Silver medal – second place	2013 Bourg-Saint-Maurice	K1
Junior European Championships
Silver medal – second place	2009 Liptovský Mikuláš	K1 team
Silver medal – second place	2010 Markkleeberg	K1 team

Joseph Clarke (born 3 November 1992) is a British slalom canoeist who has competed at the international level since 2009, specializing in the K1 (kayak) and KX1 (extreme kayak/kayak cross) events.

He is the 2016 Olympic champion in the K1 event, and the silver medalist in kayak cross from the 2024 Summer Olympics. He is also the 2023 World Champion in K1, a quadruple World Champion in the kayak cross discipline, and has won multiple medals at World and European Championships. He is the most successful kayak cross competitor at global level in the history of the event.

== Early life ==
Clarke was born in Stoke-on-Trent, Staffordshire. He first tried canoeing during a trip with The Scout Association at the age of eight. He then applied to join the Stafford and Stone Canoe Club, but was rejected for being too young. He was given the chance to reapply through his middle school's canoeing club during year six at Walton Priory Middle School, but as they only had eight places available which were greatly oversubscribed he was required to write a letter to demonstrate why he deserved a place. His application was successful and he began training with the club, competing in his first race in 2004 at the age of 11. Clarke supports local team Stoke City F.C.

Clarke attended Alleyne's Academy high school, after going to his middle school Walton Priory Middle School. At the age of 15 he contracted bacterial meningitis which caused an abscess behind one eye. He was in hospital for two weeks and was treated with intravenous antibiotics, after which he made a full recovery.

== Career ==
Clarke made his debut for the British junior team in 2009, winning junior European Championship silver medals in the K1 team event in 2009 and 2010. He has trained at the Lee Valley White Water Centre since 2012.

He won a European Championship under-23 silver medal in the individual K1 in 2013, and World Championship silver medals in the under-23 team event in 2013 and 2014.

At senior level, he won 12 medals at the ICF Canoe Slalom World Championships with seven golds (K1: 2023; Kayak cross: 2021, 2022, 2023, 2025; Kayak cross individual: 2026; K1 team: 2018), two silvers (K1 team: 2022, Kayak cross individual: 2025) and three bronzes (K1 team: 2014, 2015, 2025).

He also won seven medals (1 gold, 2 silvers and 4 bronzes) at the European Championships, including a bronze medal in the K1 event at the 2023 European Games in Kraków.

Clarke won the overall World Cup title in kayak cross in 2023 and 2024 and in kayak cross individual in 2026.

Clarke was selected for the 2016 Summer Olympics after winning the individual K1 at the British selection trials in October 2015. At the Olympics he qualified for the final of the K1 event with the third fastest time in the semi-final. He won gold in the final with a time of 88.53 seconds, the first time a British competitor had won gold in this event. He also competed at the 2024 Summer Olympics in Paris, where he won a silver medal in kayak cross and finished 5th in the K1 event.

== Honours and other work ==
Clarke was appointed Member of the Order of the British Empire (MBE) in the 2017 New Year Honours for services to canoeing.

In 2018, Clarke guest starred in the third episode of the fourth series of the CBBC children cooking show Matilda and the Ramsay Bunch.

== World Cup individual podiums ==
	1st place, gold medalist(s)	2nd place, silver medalist(s)	3rd place, bronze medalist(s)	Total
K1	3	5	2	10
Kayak cross	4	2	3	9
Kayak cross individual	3	1	0	4
Total	10	8	5	23

Season	Date	Venue	Position	Event
2014	16 August 2014	Augsburg	2nd	K1
2018	24 June 2018	Liptovský Mikuláš	3rd	K1
2018	1 July 2018	Kraków	1st	K1
2019	16 June 2019	Lee Valley	1st	K1
2021	11 September 2021	Pau	3rd	K1
2022	12 June 2022	Prague	2nd	Kayak cross
2022	18 June 2022	Kraków	2nd	K1
2022	19 June 2022	Kraków	3rd	Kayak cross
2023	2 June 2023	Augsburg	2nd	K1
2023	4 June 2023	Augsburg	3rd	Kayak cross
2023	18 June 2023	Tacen	1st	Kayak cross
2023	2 September 2023	La Seu d'Urgell	2nd	K1
2023	3 September 2023	La Seu d'Urgell	2nd	Kayak cross
2024	14 June 2024	Kraków	1st	K1
2024	22 September 2024	La Seu d'Urgell	1st	Kayak cross
2025	31 August 2025	Tacen	1st	Kayak cross individual
2026	31 May 2026	Tacen	3rd	Kayak cross
2026	5 June 2026	Prague	2nd	K1
2026	7 June 2026	Prague	2nd	Kayak cross individual
2026	14 June 2026	Augsburg	1st	Kayak cross
2026	5 September 2026	Vaires-sur-Marne	1st	Kayak cross individual
2026	5 September 2026	Vaires-sur-Marne	1st	Kayak cross
2026	10 September 2026	La Seu d'Urgell	1st	Kayak cross individual

== Results ==
=== 2009 ===
Date	Tournament	Event	Score			Place
Date	Tournament	Event	Run 1	Run 2	Best Run	Place
22–26 July	Junior European Championship	K1 Men Individual Heat	110.28	108.97	108.97	27
22–26 July	Junior European Championship	K1 Men Team Heat	N/A		121.97	4
22–26 July	Junior European Championship	K1 Men Team Final	N/A		115.45	2

=== 2010 ===
Date	Tournament	Event	Score			Place
Date	Tournament	Event	Run 1	Run 2	Best Run	Place
8–11 July	Junior World Championship	K1 Men Individual Heat	102.40	101.18	101.18	3
8–11 July	Junior World Championship	K1 Men Individual Semi-final	N/A		122.79	30
8–11 July	Junior World Championship	K1 Men Team Final	N/A		116.40	5
4–7 August	Junior European Championship	K1 Men Individual Heat	98.23	96.97	96.97	4
4–7 August	Junior European Championship	K1 Men Individual Semi-final	N/A		104.88	16
4–7 August	Junior European Championship	K1 Men Team Final	N/A		115.02	2

=== 2011 ===
Date	Tournament	Event	Score			Place
Date	Tournament	Event	Run 1	Run 2	Best Run	Place
1–3 July	World Cup Race 2	K1 Men Individual Heat	102.40	103.92	102.40	44
14–17 July	U23 European Championship	K1 Men Individual Heat	97.84	100.54	97.84	15
14–17 July	U23 European Championship	K1 Men Individual Semi-final	N/A		101.60	18
14–17 July	U23 European Championship	K1 Men Team Semi-final	N/A		106.02	2
14–17 July	U23 European Championship	K1 Men Team Final	N/A		117.73	6
~	World Cup Final Standings	K1 Men Individual	N/A			117

=== 2012 ===
Date	Tournament	Event	Score			Place
Date	Tournament	Event	Run 1	Run 2	Best Run	Place
11–15 July	U23 World Championship	K1 Men Individual Heat	115.37	unknown		30
11–15 July	U23 World Championship	K1 Men Individual Semi-final	N/A		108.96	12
11–15 July	U23 World Championship	K1 Men Team Final	N/A		131.15	10
6–9 September	U23 European Championship	K1 Men Individual Heat	113.38	111.02	111.02	8
6–9 September	U23 European Championship	K1 Men Individual Semi-final	N/A		105.12	5
6–9 September	U23 European Championship	K1 Men Individual Final	N/A		107.60	7
6–9 September	U23 European Championship	K1 Men Team	N/A		128.61	9

=== 2013 ===
Date	Tournament	Event	Score			Place
Date	Tournament	Event	Run 1	Run 2	Best Run	Place
6–9 June	European Championship	K1 Men Individual Heat	N/A		85.76	8
6–9 June	European Championship	K1 Men Individual Final	N/A		138.07	13
6–9 June	European Championship	K1 Men Team Final	N/A		103.24	7
21–23 June	World Cup Race 1	K1 Men Individual	unknown			
21–23 June	World Cup Race 1	K1 Men Team Final	N/A		107.85	4
5–7 July	World Cup Race 3	K1 Men Individual Heat	unknown			
5–7 July	World Cup Race 3	K1 Men Individual Semi-final	N/A		103.40	30
5–7 July	World Cup Race 3	K1 Men Team Final	unknown			
17–21 July	U23 World Championship	K1 Men Individual	unknown			31
17–21 July	U23 World Championship	K1 Men Team	unknown			2
30 July – 4 August	U23 European Championship	K1 Men Individual	unknown			2
30 July – 4 August	U23 European Championship	K1 Men Team	unknown			4
16–18 August	World Cup Race 4	K1 Men Individual Heat	unknown			
16–18 August	World Cup Race 4	K1 Men Individual Semi-final	N/A		112.05	29
16–18 August	World Cup Race 4	K1 Men Team Final	N/A		125.27	8
11–15 September	World Championship	K1 Men Individual Heat	140.81	88.10	88.10	9
11–15 September	World Championship	K1 Men Individual Semi-final	N/A		97.64	6
11–15 September	World Championship	K1 Men Individual Final	N/A		101.07	6
11–15 September	World Championship	K1 Men Team Final	N/A		113.94	5
~	World Cup Final Standings	K1 Men Individual	N/A			35

=== 2014 ===
Date	Tournament	Event	Score			Place
Date	Tournament	Event	Run 1	Run 2	Best Run	Place
22–27 April	U23 World Championship	K1 Men Individual Heat	95.06	94.44	94.44	9
22–27 April	U23 World Championship	K1 Men Individual Semi-final	N/A		100.93	11
22–27 April	U23 World Championship	K1 Men Team Final	N/A		106.32	2
29 May – 1 June	European Championship	K1 Men Individual Heat	87.52	136.35	87.52	13z
29 May – 1 June	European Championship	K1 Men Individual Semi-final	N/A		88.30	15
29 May – 1 June	European Championship	K1 Men Individual Final	N/A		91.47	11
29 May – 1 June	European Championship	K1 Men Team Final	N/A		98.75	2
6–8 June	World Cup Race 1	K1 Men Individual Heat	unknown			
6–8 June	World Cup Race 1	K1 Men Individual Semi-final	N/A		97.88	11
6–8 June	World Cup Race 1	K1 Men Team Final	N/A		108.71	1
13–15 June	World Cup Race 2	K1 Men Individual Heat	unknown			
13–15 June	World Cup Race 2	K1 Men Individual Semi-final	N/A		152.10	34
13–15 June	World Cup Race 2	K1 Men Team Final	N/A		122.92	8
20–22 June	World Cup Race 3					
20–22 June	World Cup Race 3	K1 Men Individual Heat	unknown			
20–22 June	World Cup Race 3	K1 Men Individual Semi-final	unknown			
20–22 June	World Cup Race 3	K1 Men Individual Final	N/A		98.76	6
20–22 June	World Cup Race 3	K1 Men Team Final	N/A		157.21	10
1–3 August	World Cup Race 4	K1 Men Individual Heat	unknown			
1–3 August	World Cup Race 4	K1 Men Individual Semi-final	N/A		97.68	24
15–17 August	World Cup Final	K1 Men Individual Heat	unknown			
15–17 August	World Cup Final	K1 Men Individual Semi-final	unknown			
15–17 August	World Cup Final	K1 Men Individual Final	N/A		95.49	2
15–17 August	World Cup Final	K1 Men Team Final	N/A		113.92	6
17–21 Sep	World Championship	K1 Men Individual Heat	101.05	204.40	101.05	19
17–21 Sep	World Championship	K1 Men Individual Semi-final	N/A		156.36	36
17–21 Sep	World Championship	K1 Men Team Final	N/A		123.24	3
~	World Cup Final Standings	K1 Men Individual	N/A			4

=== 2015 ===
Date	Tournament	Event	Score			Place
Date	Tournament	Event	Run 1	Run 2	Best Run	Place
28–31 May	European Championship	K1 Men Individual Heat	94.91	unknown		1
28–31 May	European Championship	K1 Men Individual Semi-final	N/A		95.14	3
28–31 May	European Championship	K1 Men Individual Final	N/A		96.16	8
28–31 May	European Championship	K1 Men Team Final	N/A		108.01	2
19–21 June	World Cup Race 1	K1 Men Individual Heat	unknown			
19–21 June	World Cup Race 1	K1 Men Individual Semi-final	unknown			
19–21 June	World Cup Race 1	K1 Men Individual Final	N/A		DSQ-R	10
19–21 June	World Cup Race 1	K1 Men Team Final	N/A		103.19	4
26–28 June	World Cup Race 2	K1 Men Individual Heat	unknown			
26–28 June	World Cup Race 2	K1 Men Individual Semi-final	unknown			
26–28 June	World Cup Race 2	K1 Men Individual Final	N/A		82.48	4
3–5 July	World Cup Race 3	K1 Men Individual Heat	unknown			
3–5 July	World Cup Race 3	K1 Men Individual Semi-final	N/A		98.77	29
3–5 July	World Cup Race 3	K1 Men Team Final	N/A		DNS	=16
7–9 August	World Cup Race 4	K1 Men Individual Heat	unknown			
7–9 August	World Cup Race 4	K1 Men Individual Semi-final	unknown			
7–9 August	World Cup Race 4	K1 Men Individual Final	N/A		96.05	9
14–16 August	World Cup Final	K1 Men Individual Heat	unknown			
14–16 August	World Cup Final	K1 Men Individual Semi-final	N/A		100.23	18
14–16 August	World Cup Final	K1 Men Team Final	N/A		106.48	2
16–20 September	World Championship	K1 Men Individual Heat	81.47	unknown		2
16–20 September	World Championship	K1 Men Individual Semi-final	N/A		142.57	38
16–20 September	World Championship	K1 Men Team Final	N/A		106.38	3
~	World Cup Final Standings	K1 Men Individual	N/A			7

=== 2016 ===
Date	Tournament	Event	Score			Place
Date	Tournament	Event	Run 1	Run 2	Best Run	Place
13–15 May	European Championship	K1 Men Individual Heat	92.58	unknown		19
13–15 May	European Championship	K1 Men Individual Semi-final	N/A		94.98	5
13–15 May	European Championship	K1 Men Individual Final	N/A		144.58	10
13–15 May	European Championship	K1 Men Team Final	N/A		118.17	4
10–12 June	World Cup Race 2	K1 Men Individual Heat	unknown			
10–12 June	World Cup Race 2	K1 Men Individual Semi-final	N/A		96.16	18
7–11 August	Olympic Games	K1 Men Individual Heat	135.89	86.95	86.95	2
7–11 August	Olympic Games	K1 Men Individual Semi-final	N/A		90.67	3
7–11 August	Olympic Games	K1 Men Individual Final	N/A		88.53	1
World Cup Final Standings	K1 Men Individual	N/A				61
