= Manuel Ochoa (canoeist) =

Spanish canoeist

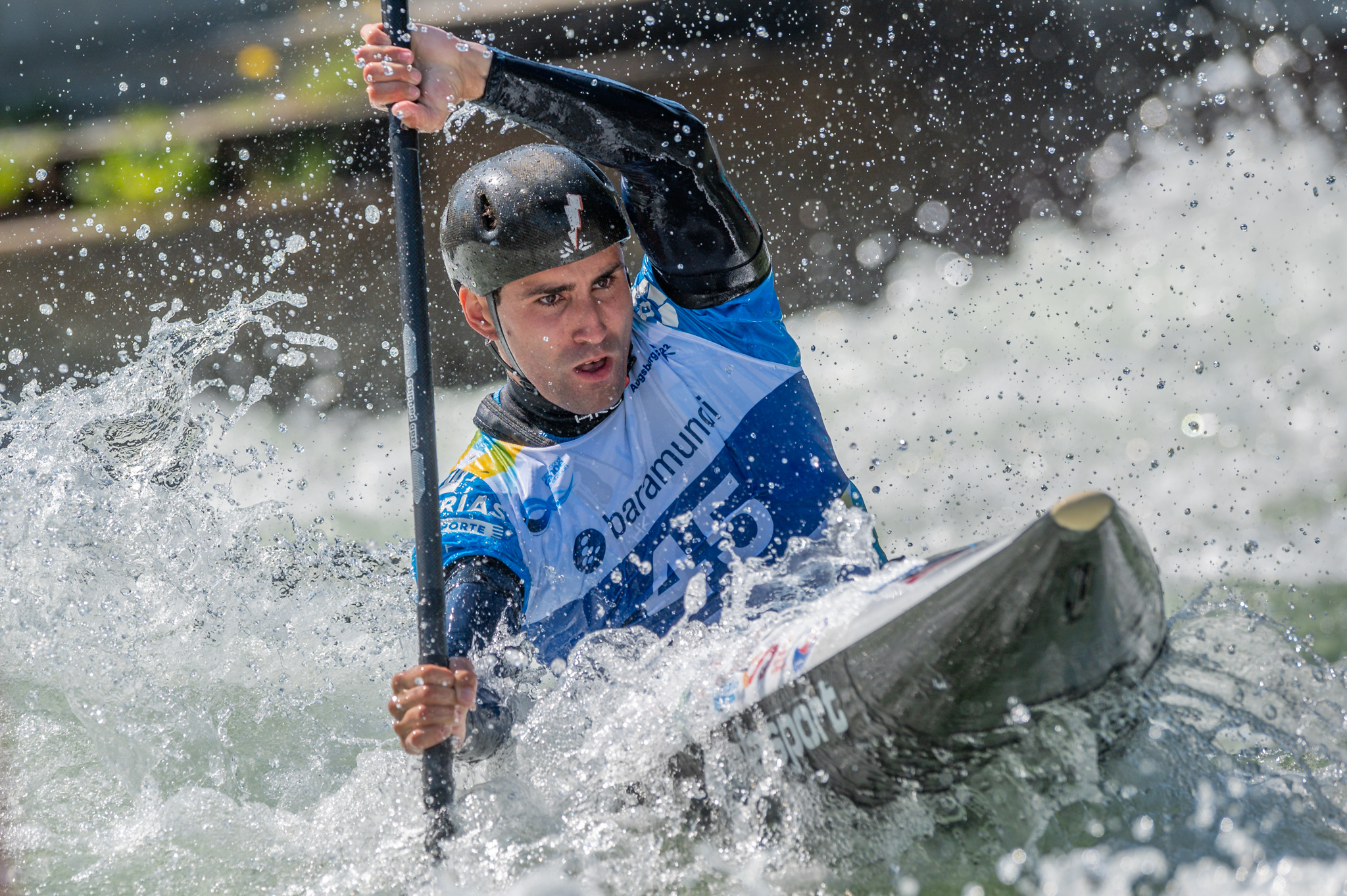
- Ochoa in 2022

Personal information
- Born: 21 December 1998 (age 27) Tomiño, Spain

Sport
- Sport: Canoe slalom
- Event: K1, Kayak cross
Medal record
Men's canoe slalom
Representing Spain
European Championships
Bronze medal – third place	2026 Ivrea	Kayak cross individual
World U23 Championships
Bronze medal – third place	2019 Kraków	K1 team
European U23 Championships
Bronze medal – third place	2021 Solkan	Kayak cross
Bronze medal – third place	2021 Solkan	K1 team
European Junior Championships
Silver medal – second place	2016 Solkan	K1 team

Manuel Ochoa (born 21 December 1998) is a Spanish slalom canoeist who has competed at the international level since 2016, specializing in K1 and kayak cross.

He won a bronze medal in kayak cross individual at the 2026 European Championships in Ivrea.

Ochoa competed in men's kayak cross event at the 2024 Summer Olympics where he finished in 14th position.

== World Cup individual podiums ==
Season	Date	Venue	Position	Event
2022	4 September 2022	La Seu d'Urgell	2nd	Kayak cross
2024	9 June 2024	Prague	1st	Kayak cross^{1}
2025	8 June 2025	La Seu d'Urgell	1st	Kayak cross
2025	29 June 2025	Prague	3rd	Kayak cross
2026	14 June 2026	Augsburg	1st	Kayak cross individual
2026	5 September 2026	Vaires-sur-Marne	2nd	Kayak cross individual
2026	10 September 2026	La Seu d'Urgell	2nd	Kayak cross individual
2026	13 September 2026	La Seu d'Urgell	1st	Kayak cross

^{1} 2024 Olympic qualifier. Did not count for World Cup rankings.
