= Jakub Krejčí =

Czech slalom canoeist (born 2002)

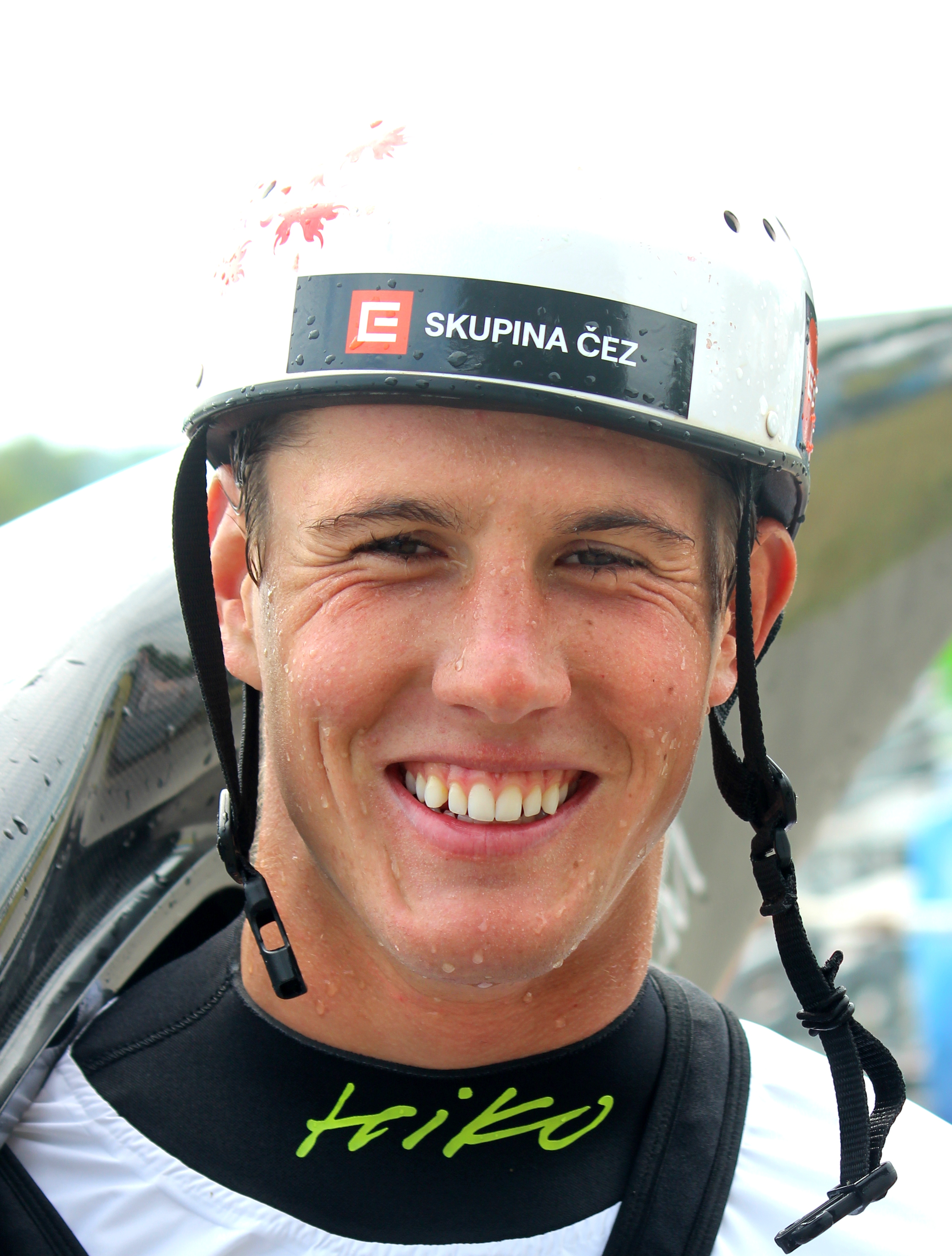
- Krejčí in 2023

Personal information
- Nationality: Czech
- Born: 23 January 2002 (age 24) České Budějovice, Czech Republic

Sport
- Country: Czech Republic
- Sport: Canoe slalom
- Event: K1, Kayak cross
Medal record
Men's canoe slalom
Representing the Czech Republic
World Championships
| Gold medal – first place | 2023 London | K1 team |
| Gold medal – first place | 2026 Oklahoma City | K1 |
| Silver medal – second place | 2025 Penrith | K1 |
| Silver medal – second place | 2026 Oklahoma City | Kayak cross individual |
| Bronze medal – third place | 2025 Penrith | Kayak cross individual |
European Championships
| Gold medal – first place | 2024 Tacen | K1 team |
| Gold medal – first place | 2025 Vaires-sur-Marne | Kayak cross |
| Gold medal – first place | 2026 Ivrea | K1 |
| Silver medal – second place | 2026 Ivrea | K1 team |
U23 World Championships
| Gold medal – first place | 2021 Tacen | K1 |
| Gold medal – first place | 2021 Tacen | K1 team |
| Silver medal – second place | 2024 Liptovský Mikuláš | K1 |
| Bronze medal – third place | 2025 Foix | Kayak cross individual |
| Bronze medal – third place | 2025 Foix | K1 team |
U23 European Championships
| Gold medal – first place | 2021 Solkan | K1 |
| Gold medal – first place | 2021 Solkan | Kayak cross |
| Gold medal – first place | 2022 České Budějovice | K1 |
| Silver medal – second place | 2023 Bratislava | K1 |
Junior World Championships
| Silver medal – second place | 2018 Ivrea | Kayak cross |
| Silver medal – second place | 2018 Ivrea | K1 team |
| Silver medal – second place | 2019 Kraków | K1 |
| Silver medal – second place | 2019 Kraków | K1 team |
Junior European Championships
| Bronze medal – third place | 2018 Bratislava | K1 team |
| Bronze medal – third place | 2020 Kraków | K1 |

Jakub Krejčí (born 23 January 2002) is a Czech slalom canoeist who has competed at the international level since 2018.

He won five medals at the ICF Canoe Slalom World Championships with two golds (K1: 2026, K1 team: 2023), two silvers (K1: 2025, kayak cross individual: 2026) and a bronze (kayak cross individual: 2025). He also won three golds and one silver at the European Championships.

== World Cup individual podiums ==
| | 1st place, gold medalist(s) | 2nd place, silver medalist(s) | 3rd place, bronze medalist(s) | Total |
| K1 | 2 | 0 | 3 | 5 |
| Kayak cross | 1 | 0 | 0 | 1 |
| Kayak cross individual | 1 | 2 | 1 | 4 |
| Total | 4 | 2 | 4 | 10 |

| Season | Date | Venue | Position | Event |
|---|---|---|---|---|
| 2024 | 7 June 2024 | Prague | 3rd | K1 |
| 2024 | 14 June 2024 | Kraków | 3rd | K1 |
| 2025 | 15 June 2025 | Pau | 1st | Kayak cross individual |
| 2025 | 29 June 2025 | Prague | 2nd | Kayak cross individual |
| 2025 | 31 August 2025 | Tacen | 2nd | Kayak cross individual |
| 2026 | 29 May 2026 | Tacen | 3rd | K1 |
| 2026 | 31 May 2026 | Tacen | 3rd | Kayak cross individual |
| 2026 | 5 June 2026 | Prague | 1st | K1 |
| 2026 | 7 June 2026 | Prague | 1st | Kayak cross |
| 2026 | 12 June 2026 | Augsburg | 1st | K1 |
