= Ivrea Whitewater Stadium =

Whitewater course in Ivrea, Italy

- Stadio della Canoa di Ivrea
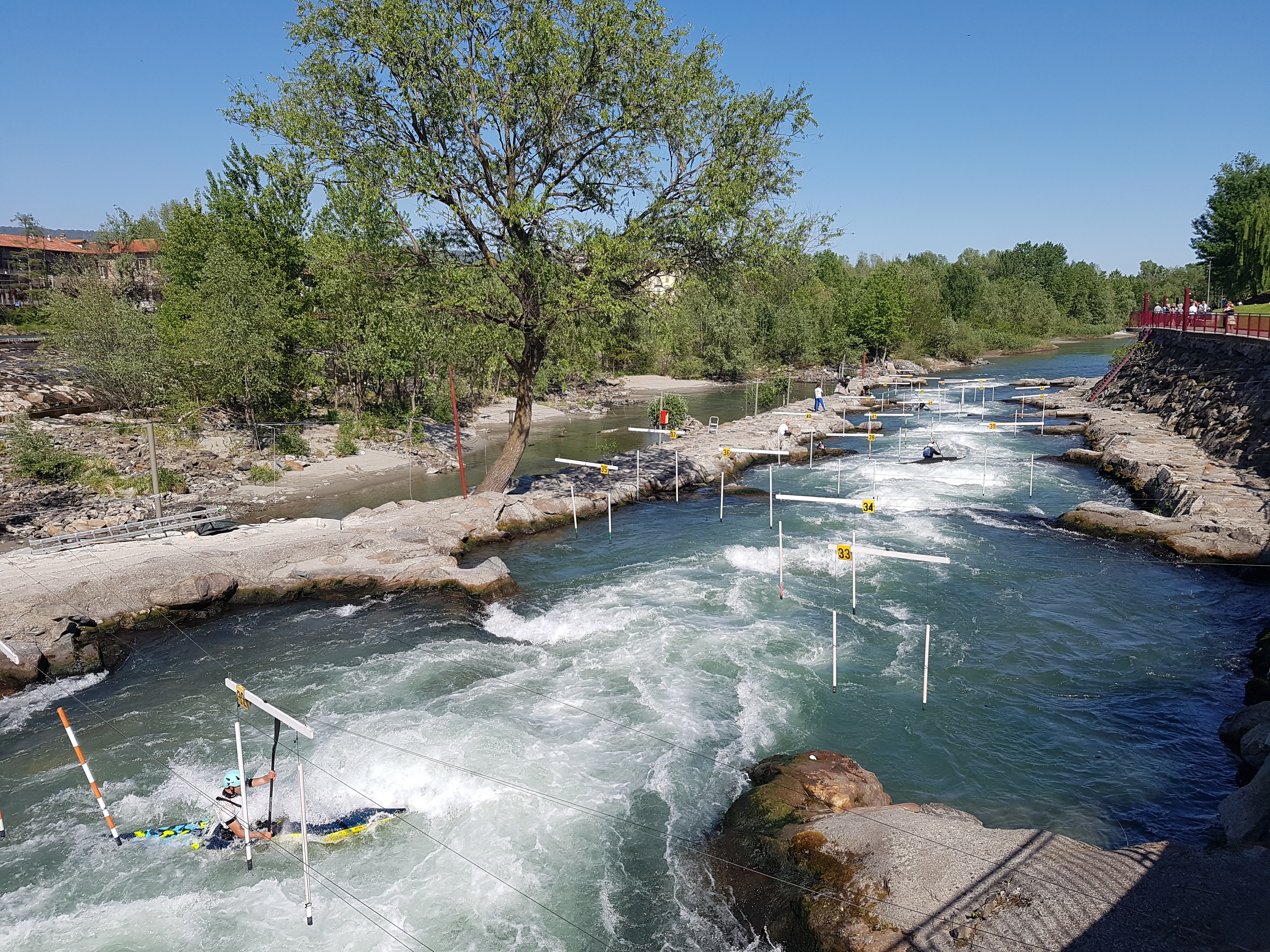

About
- Locale: Ivrea, Italy
- Coordinates: 45.4642°N 7.8753°E
- Practice pool: Yes

Stats
- Length: 230 m (750 ft)
- Drop: 6 m (20 ft)
- Slope: 3%

The Ivrea Whitewater Stadium (Italian: Stadio della Canoa di Ivrea) is an artificial whitewater sporting facility located in Ivrea, Italy.

== History ==
The practice of canoeing in Ivrea began in the 1950s. The subsequent founding and growing importance of the local Ivrea Canoe Club led to a long series of efforts aimed at modifying the configuration of a part of the Dora Baltea riverbed near the city center to make it more suitable for the sport, ultimately resulting in the creation of the current whitewater facility. The latest and most relevant work campaigns include the works carried out in 2005 by Ondrej Cibák, which redesigned the slope of the last part of the canal to better distribute the significant drop of the facility. Cibák had previously designed the Ondrej Cibak Whitewater Slalom Course in Liptovský Mikuláš, Slovakia. In 2006, the French company Hydrostadium, which had already designed the Hellinikon Olympic Canoe/Kayak Slalom Centre for the 2004 Summer Olympics in Athens, carried out works on the canal.

In 2016 additional works were carried out by Whitewater Park International, which also designed the Olympic canals in Sydney, London, and Rio de Janeiro.

The facility hosted the first round of the 2016 Canoe Slalom World Cup and the fourth round of the 2017 Canoe Slalom World Cup. It also hosted the 2021 European Canoe Slalom Championships and the 2022 World Junior and U23 Canoe Slalom Championships.
