= Finn Butcher =

New Zealand slalom canoeist (born 1995)

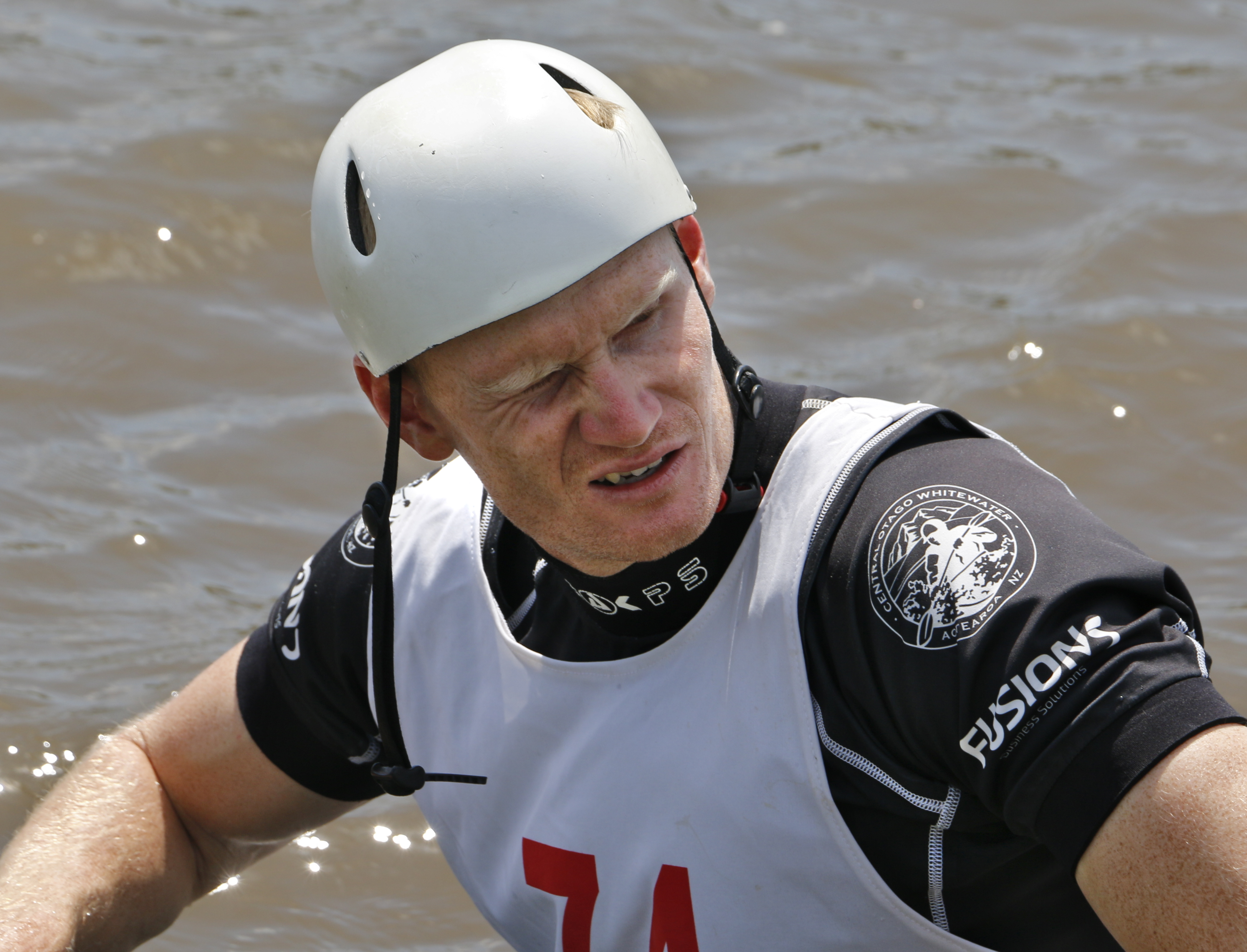
- Butcher in 2024

Personal information
- Born: 17 March 1995 (age 31) Dunedin, New Zealand
- Height: 1.82 m (6 ft 0 in)
- Weight: 77 kg (170 lb)

Sport
- Sport: Canoe slalom
- Event: K1, Kayak cross
Medal record
Men's canoe slalom
Representing New Zealand
Olympic Games
Gold medal – first place	2024 Paris	Kayak cross
World Championships
Silver medal – second place	2021 Bratislava	Kayak cross
Oceania Championships
Gold medal – first place	2025 Penrith	K1
Bronze medal – third place	2025 Penrith	Kayak cross

Finn Butcher (born 17 March 1995) is a New Zealand slalom canoeist who has competed at the international level since 2012, specialising in K1 and kayak cross. He is the inaugural Olympic champion in kayak cross in 2024.

== Early life ==
Butcher was born in Dunedin on 17 March 1995. He grew up in Alexandra in Central Otago. He attended Dunstan High School. He is often referred to as "The Butcher".

Butcher studied industrial design at the University of Otago for two years. He took a year off from university to concentrate on training, travelling, and competition. He moved to Auckland in 2016. He then enrolled for and graduated from a bachelor of sport and exercise via distance study at Massey University.

== Canoeing ==
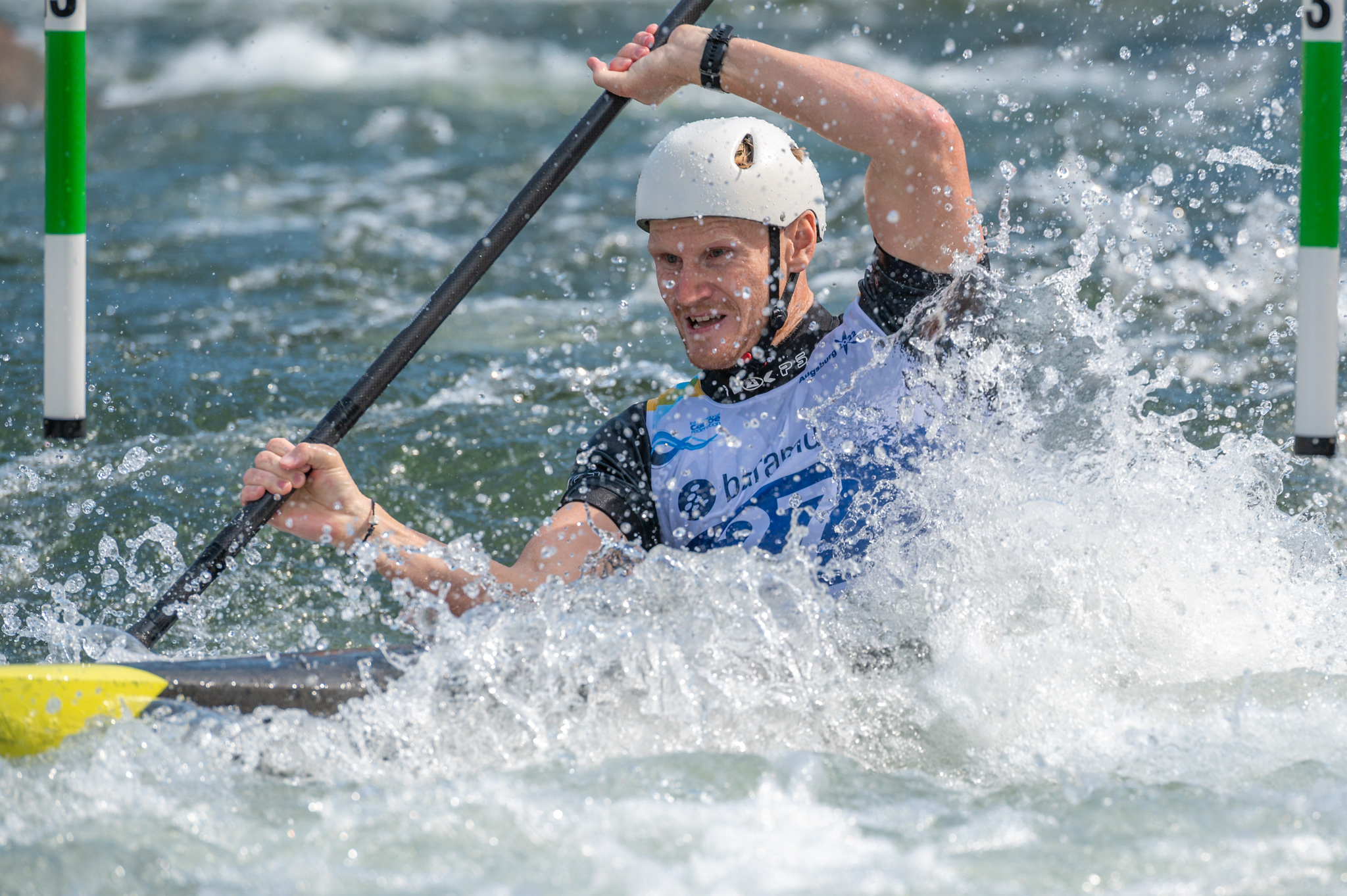
Butcher at the 2022 ICF Canoe Slalom World Championships

Butcher first tried paddling aged nine. His early canoeing experience is from the Kawarau River. His mentor was Alan "Sarge" Hoffman, who died in 2022. Once he had moved to Auckland, he flatted with fellow canoeist Callum Gilbert so that they could maximise their training time at the then-new Vector Wero Whitewater Park in Manukau.

At the 2018 World Junior and U23 Canoe Slalom Championships, Butcher came fourth in the U23 K1 event, narrowly beaten by Sweden's Erik Holmer for the bronze medal (Holmer finished in 80.85 sec and Butcher in 80.89 sec).

He won a silver medal in kayak cross at the 2021 World Championships in Bratislava, beaten for gold by Joe Clarke.

Butcher was a non-travelling reserve for the Tokyo 2020 Olympic games for the K1 event. At the 2023 ICF Canoe Slalom World Championships, he gained quota places for New Zealand in K1 and kayak cross by finishing 13th and 11th, respectively. He was selected to fill these quota places and competed in K1 and kayak cross. In the K1, he missed getting into the finals and finished 19th. In the kayak cross, he became the inaugural Olympic champion when he unexpectedly beat the three-time world champion Joe Clarke.

== World Cup individual podiums ==
Season	Date	Venue	Position	Event
2021	13 June 2021	Prague	2nd	Kayak cross
2023	8 October 2023	Vaires-sur-Marne	2nd	Kayak cross
2024	31 May 2024	Augsburg	2nd	K1
2024	2 June 2024	Augsburg	3rd	Kayak cross
2025	29 June 2025	Prague	1st	Kayak cross
2026	13 September 2026	La Seu d'Urgell	2nd	Kayak cross
