= Benjamin Renia =

French slalom canoeist

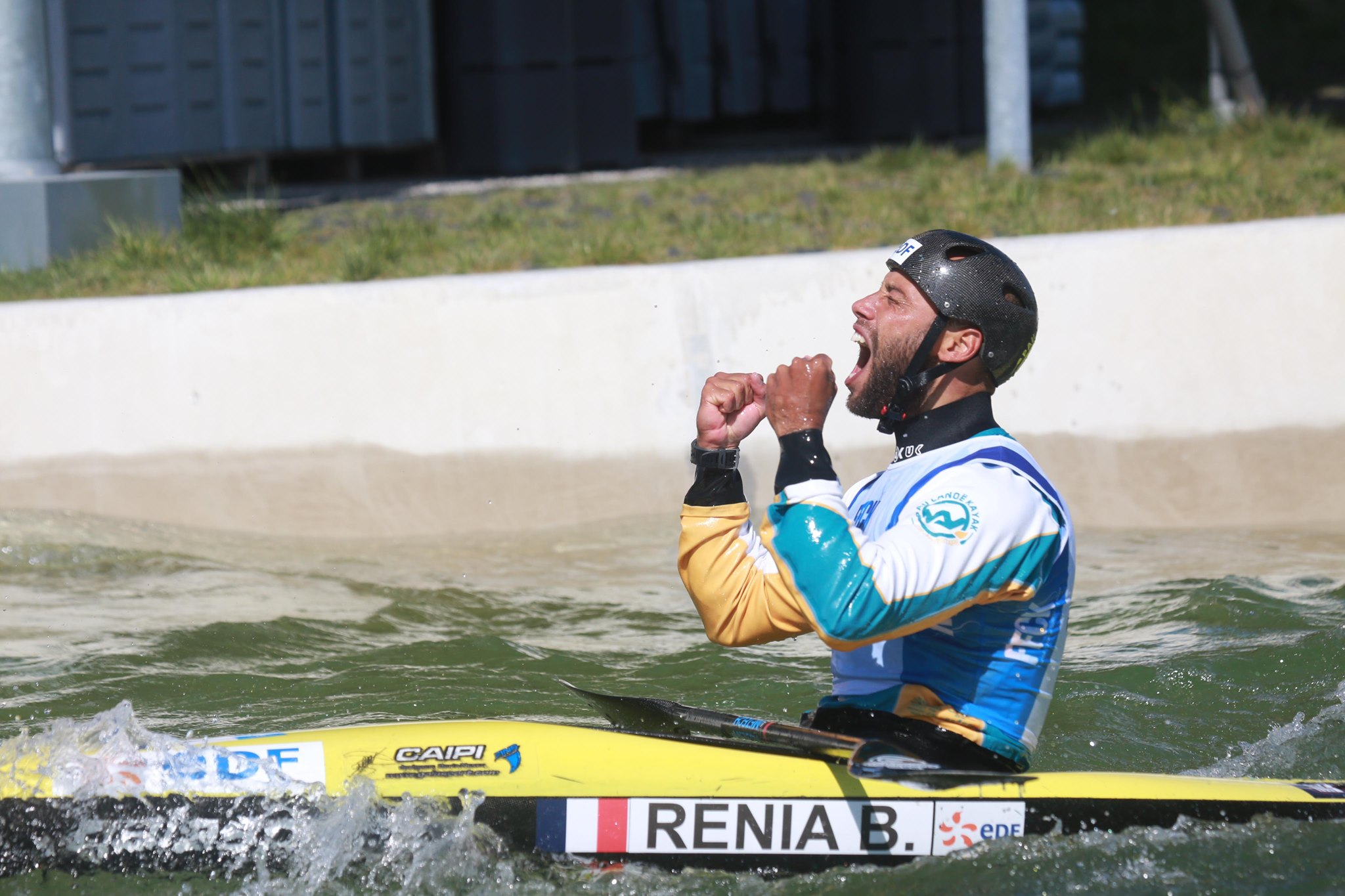

Personal information
- Nationality: French
- Born: 7 March 1990 (age 36)
- Height: 1.76 m (5 ft 9 in)
- Weight: 75 kg (165 lb)

Sport
- Country: France
- Sport: Canoe slalom
- Event: K1, Kayak cross
Medal record
Men's canoe slalom
Representing France
World Championships
Gold medal – first place	2021 Bratislava	K1 team
Gold medal – first place	2025 Penrith	K1 team
Silver medal – second place	2023 London	K1 team
European Games
Bronze medal – third place	2023 Kraków	K1 team
European Championships
Silver medal – second place	2025 Vaires-sur-Marne	Kayak cross
Silver medal – second place	2025 Vaires-sur-Marne	K1 team
Bronze medal – third place	2025 Vaires-sur-Marne	Kayak cross individual
U23 European Championships
Silver medal – second place	2011 Banja Luka	K1
Silver medal – second place	2013 Bourg St. Maurice	K1 team
Junior World Championships
Gold medal – first place	2008 Roudnice nad Labem	K1 team
Bronze medal – third place	2008 Roudnice nad Labem	K1

Benjamin Renia (born 7 March 1990) is a French slalom canoeist who has competed at the international level since 2008.

He won three medals in the K1 team event at the World Championships with two golds (2021, 2025) and a silver (2023). He also won four medals (two silvers and two bronzes) at the European Championships, including a bronze in the K1 team event at the 2023 European Games in Kraków.

== World Cup individual podiums ==
Season	Date	Venue	Position	Event
2020	7 November 2020	Pau	2nd	Kayak cross
2023	4 June 2023	Augsburg	1st	Kayak cross
2025	8 June 2025	La Seu d'Urgell	3rd	Kayak cross individual
