= Lucien Delfour =

French-Australian slalom canoeist

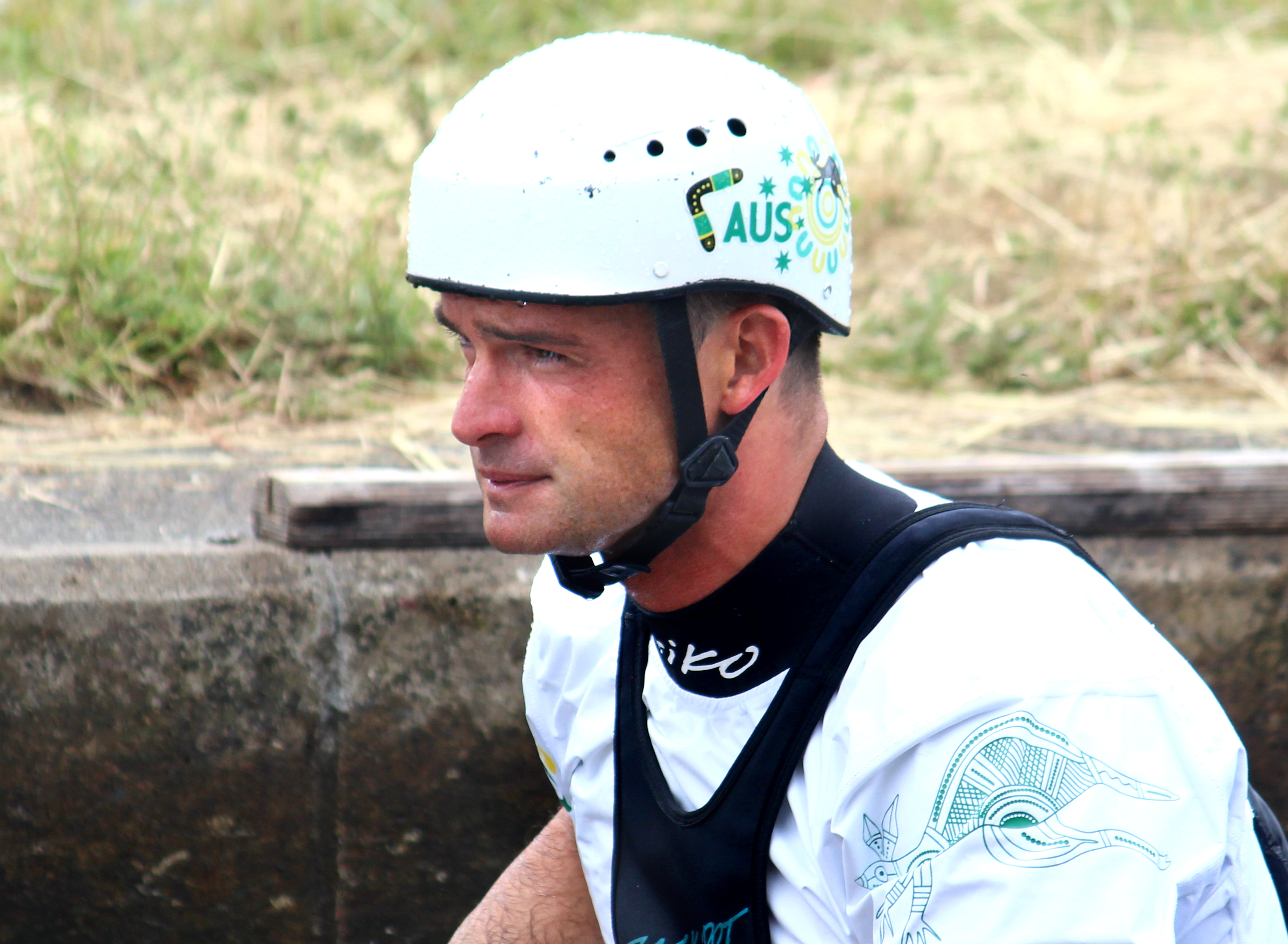
- Lucien Delfour (2023).

Personal information
- Born: 22 December 1988 (age 37) Papeete, French Polynesia
- Height: 177 cm (5 ft 10 in)
- Weight: 69 kg (152 lb)

Sport
- Sport: Canoe slalom
- Event: K1
- Club: Western Sydney Whitewater Club
- Coached by: Julien Billaut
Medal record
Men's canoe slalom
Representing France
Junior World Championships
| Bronze medal – third place | 2006 Solkan | K1 team |
Junior European Championships
| Silver medal – second place | 2006 Nottingham | K1 |
Representing Australia
Oceania Championships
| Silver medal – second place | 2025 Penrith | K1 |
| Silver medal – second place | 2025 Penrith | Kayak cross |

Lucien Delfour (born 22 December 1988) is a French-Australian slalom canoeist who has competed at the international level since 2006. He represented France in the 2006 season. Since 2010 he has represented Australia.

Delfour qualified for the 2020 Tokyo Olympics.He completed his heats and semi-final successfully with an excellent time of 91.12 in his heats second run the highlight. Delfour finished 8th in the final of the Men's slalom K1 event with a time of 102.33.

== Early years ==
Delfour was born in Papeete in French Polynesia, He has the nickname 'Lulu' and started canoeing in 1997 at the age of 8.

Delfour enjoyed both the slalom and downriver disciplines but had to make a choice. From the age of 14 he decided to focus solely on slalom. He won silver in the 2006 European Junior Championships in Nottingham, Great Britain

In 2010, Delfour moved to Australia and four years later became an Australian citizen.

== Achievements ==
Training under Julien Billaut, Delfour secured the single men's Rio 2016 K1 canoe slalom spot after a head-to-head battle with Australian Jaxon Merritt at the 2016 Oceania Championships.

Delfour participated at two Olympic Games. His first appearance was at the 2016 Summer Olympics in Rio de Janeiro where he finished in 17th place in the K1 event.

Delfour won several medals at the Canoe Slalom World Cup, placing second overall in 2015 in the K1 class.

== World Cup individual podiums ==
| Season | Date | Venue | Position | Event |
|---|---|---|---|---|
| 2012 | 16 June 2012 | Pau | 3rd | K1 |
| 2013 | 6 July 2013 | La Seu d'Urgell | 2nd | K1 |
| 2015 | 8 August 2015 | La Seu d'Urgell | 3rd | K1 |
| 2015 | 15 August 2015 | Pau | 3rd | K1 |
| 2018 | 9 September 2018 | La Seu d'Urgell | 2nd | K1 |
| 2019 | 1 September 2019 | Markkleeberg | 2nd | K1 |
| 2025 | 6 June 2025 | La Seu d'Urgell | 3rd | K1 |
| 2025 | 13 June 2025 | Pau | 3rd | K1 |
