= 2023 ICF Canoe Slalom World Championships – Men's K1 =

Men's kayak at the 2023 ICF Canoe Slalom World Championships
- Venue: Lee Valley White Water Centre
- Location: London, United Kingdom
- Dates: 21–23 September 2023
- Competitors: 101 from 45 nations

Medalists
gold medal	Joseph Clarke	Great Britain
silver medal	Jiří Prskavec	Czech Republic
bronze medal	Mathis Soudi	Morocco

The men's kayak event at the 2023 ICF Canoe Slalom World Championships took place on 23 September 2023 at the Lee Valley White Water Centre in London, with the qualification heats on 21 September 2023.

== Competition format ==
The event uses a three-round format with qualification heats, semifinal and final. Paddlers complete up to two runs in the heats, with the top ranked athletes starting last. In the first heat, the 30 fastest paddlers qualify automatically for the semifinal, whilst the rest compete in the second heat for additional 10 qualification spots. The final rank of non-qualifying athletes is determined by their second run score. Paddlers start in the reverse order of their heats position in the semifinal and complete a single run, with the top 10 advancing to the final. The start list for the final is once again in reverse order of the semifinal results. The athlete with the best time in the single-run final is awarded gold.

A penalty of 2 seconds is awarded for touching a gate and a 50-second penalty is awarded for missing a gate or negotiating it in the opposite direction.

The heats setup had 23 gates including 6 upstream gates (3-11-12-15-19-23). The semifinal and final gate setup also had 23 gates with 6 upstream gates (3-11-12-15-19-23), but in a more difficult configuration, causing slower times.

== Schedule ==
All times listed are UTC+1.

Date	Time	Round
21 September 2023
21 September 2023	10:21	Heats Run 1
21 September 2023	14:31	Heats Run 2
23 September 2023
23 September 2023	11:07	Semifinal
23 September 2023	14:12	Final

== Results ==
British paddler Joseph Clarke was the last man to start after winning the semifinal and he managed to back up his semifinal run with another clean and fast run to win gold ahead of the Czech paddler Jiří Prskavec and Mathis Soudi from Morocco. For Clarke it was his first individual medal in the K1 event at the World Championships. Prskavec won his fifth medal in the discipline and third silver. Soudi made history by becoming the first African paddler to win any kind of medal at the Canoe Slalom World Championships.

There were 15 quota spots available for the 2024 Summer Olympics, one per country. The quota spots were secured by:

- Great Britain
- Czech Republic
- Morocco
- Switzerland
- Australia
- Italy
- Poland
- Spain
- Slovenia
- China
- Sweden
- New Zealand
- Japan
- Ireland
- Slovakia

Penalties are included in the time shown. The fastest time in each round is shown in bold.

Rank	Bib	Athlete	Country	Heats						Semifinal			Final		
Rank	Bib	Athlete	Country	Run 1			Run 2			Semifinal			Final		
Rank	Bib	Athlete	Country	Time	Pen	Rank	Time	Pen	Rank	Time	Pen	Rank	Time	Pen	Rank
1st place, gold medalist(s)	6	Joseph Clarke	Great Britain	83.28	2	23	-			**90.96**	0	1	**91.32**	0	1
2nd place, silver medalist(s)	1	Jiří Prskavec	Czech Republic	79.12	0	2	-			92.70	0	2	93.26	0	2
3rd place, bronze medalist(s)	40	Mathis Soudi	Morocco	80.87	0	10	-			95.15	0	5	93.91	0	3
4	7	Martin Dougoud	Switzerland	81.53	0	12	-			94.56	0	4	93.93	0	4
5	23	Timothy Anderson	Australia	79.84	0	5	-			95.52	0	6	94.50	0	5
6	4	Giovanni De Gennaro	Italy	79.96	0	7	-			94.26	0	3	94.74	0	6
7	92	Mateusz Polaczyk	Poland	134.04	52	79	81.71	0	4	95.74	0	8	95.04	0	7
8	26	Pau Echaniz	Spain	86.65	4	34	81.95	0	6	95.96	0	9	96.59	0	8
9	28	Jonny Dickson	Great Britain	133.68	54	78	82.91	2	10	95.99	0	10	98.28	0	9
10	3	Peter Kauzer	Slovenia	81.43	0	11	-			95.64	0	7	152.71	52	10
11	24	Quan Xin	China	83.63	2	25	-			96.30	0	11	did not advance		
12	33	Isak Öhrström	Sweden	83.23	0	22	-			96.51	0	12	did not advance		
13	18	Finn Butcher	New Zealand	82.67	0	18	-			96.79	0	13	did not advance		
14	13	Titouan Castryck	France	82.05	0	15	-			97.00	0	14	did not advance		
15	52	Yuuki Tanaka	Japan	81.79	0	13	-			97.05	4	15	did not advance		
16	42	Noel Hendrick	Ireland	84.79	0	30	-			97.20	0	16	did not advance		
17	19	Jakub Krejčí	Czech Republic	**79.11**	0	1	-			97.21	2	17	did not advance		
18	36	Adam Gonšenica	Slovakia	87.47	4	40	82.87	0	9	97.59	0	18	did not advance		
19	12	Jakub Grigar	Slovakia	80.36	0	8	-			97.72	2	19	did not advance		
20	5	Boris Neveu	France	83.44	2	24	-			97.76	0	20	did not advance		
21	25	David Llorente	Spain	82.56	0	17	-			97.80	4	21	did not advance		
22	10	Martin Srabotnik	Slovenia	136.67	52	84	81.84	0	5	97.83	2	22	did not advance		
23	15	Lucien Delfour	Australia	85.73	4	32	81.64	0	2	97.98	2	23	did not advance		
24	2	Vít Přindiš	Czech Republic	81.88	2	14	-			98.22	6	24	did not advance		
25	32	Pedro Gonçalves	Brazil	133.52	54	76	82.10	0	7	98.49	2	25	did not advance		
26	35	Christopher Bowers	Great Britain	80.37	0	9	-			98.70	4	26	did not advance		
27	44	Mathieu Desnos	Brazil	79.27	0	3	-			99.15	2	27	did not advance		
28	20	Dariusz Popiela	Poland	79.89	0	6	-			99.41	4	28	did not advance		
29	9	Hannes Aigner	Germany	84.11	0	28	-			99.42	4	29	did not advance		
30	30	Martin Halčin	Slovakia	84.20	0	29	-			99.68	2	30	did not advance		
31	34	Michał Pasiut	Poland	82.78	0	20	-			100.09	0	31	did not advance		
32	14	Mario Leitner	Austria	82.12	0	16	-			100.47	2	32	did not advance		
33	29	Kazuya Adachi	Japan	87.00	4	37	81.68	0	3	105.07	0	33	did not advance		
34	38	Žiga Lin Hočevar	Slovenia	82.70	0	19	-			105.25	4	34	did not advance		
35	65	Trevor Boyd	Canada	83.22	0	21	-			106.90	6	35	did not advance		
36	39	Callum Gilbert	New Zealand	84.02	0	26	-			113.52	6	36	did not advance		
37	21	Stefan Hengst	Germany	79.51	0	4	-			140.61	50	37	did not advance		
38	43	Dimitri Marx	Switzerland	133.35	50	75	82.91	0	10	144.07	52	38	did not advance		
39	37	Xabier Ferrazzi	Italy	133.66	52	77	**80.22**	0	1	159.36	54	39	did not advance		
40	41	Benjamin Pope	Australia	87.29	2	38	82.63	0	8	199.10	100	40	did not advance		
41	45	Erik Holmer	Sweden	84.04	0	27	-			203.18	100	41	did not advance		
42	16	Noah Hegge	Germany	135.36	50	82	83.02	0	12	did not advance					
43	8	Felix Oschmautz	Austria	139.31	52	87	83.64	2	13	did not advance					
44	11	Miquel Travé	Spain	139.00	52	85	84.29	2	14	did not advance					
45	22	Benjamin Renia	France	135.58	54	83	85.22	2	15	did not advance					
46	47	Fredrik Wahlén	Sweden	86.77	2	35	85.51	0	16	did not advance					
47	48	Lucas Rossi	Argentina	94.18	8	62	85.58	0	17	did not advance					
48	31	Gabriel De Coster	Belgium	184.16	102	95	85.66	4	18	did not advance					
49	46	Joshua Joseph	United States	194.03	100	96	85.69	2	19	did not advance					
50	49	Maxime Aubertin	Belgium	148.31	56	90	85.92	2	20	did not advance					
51	51	Tyler Westfall	United States	90.15	2	50	86.97	0	21	did not advance					
52	54	Samuel Curtis	Ireland	88.36	2	43	87.35	0	22	did not advance					
53	72	Matías Contreras	Argentina	139.12	54	86	87.79	2	23	did not advance					
54	87	Zhu Haoran	China	139.68	54	88	87.96	4	24	did not advance					
55	90	Imangali Mambetov	Kazakhstan	92.65	2	61	88.20	0	25	did not advance					
56	55	Alex Baldoni	Canada	87.81	4	41	88.24	4	26	did not advance					
57	73	Andraz Echeverría Olguín	Chile	86.84	0	36	88.35	4	27	did not advance					
58	70	Djanibek Temirgaliev	Uzbekistan	88.00	2	42	88.90	4	28	did not advance					
59	57	Lorand Gjoshi	Kosovo	86.59	2	33	89.10	4	29	did not advance					
60	71	Mustafa Arda Acar	Turkey	195.48	102	97	89.65	0	30	did not advance					
61	60	Ritvars Celmiņš	Latvia	88.50	0	44	90.16	2	31	did not advance					
62	50	Yusuke Muto	Japan	135.34	50	81	90.90	0	32	did not advance					
63	64	Thibaud Lacour	Romania	90.45	0	52	90.99	0	33	did not advance					
64	74	Manuel Trípano	Argentina	91.14	0	54	93.03	4	34	did not advance					
65	77	Alexis Pérez	Venezuela	97.08	4	65	93.65	0	35	did not advance					
66	63	Serhii Sovko	Ukraine	92.24	4	60	94.38	4	36	did not advance					
67	66	Frederico Alvarenga	Portugal	89.40	0	48	94.87	0	37	did not advance					
68	78	Vilius Rasimavičius	Lithuania	94.87	2	63	94.95	2	38	did not advance					
69	94	Salim Ahmad Jemai	Tunisia	89.63	0	49	95.22	8	39	did not advance					
70	88	Andy Barat	Comoros	102.24	2	68	95.69	0	40	did not advance					
71	76	Mārtiņš Plaudis	Latvia	95.60	0	64	96.78	0	41	did not advance					
72	56	Alistair McCreery	Ireland	91.84	2	58	99.55	4	42	did not advance					
73	79	Antonio Reinoso	Mexico	98.07	2	66	103.20	4	43	did not advance					
74	80	Yusuf Emir Ertek	Turkey	275.61	152	99	103.92	2	44	did not advance					
75	89	Ong Jun Yi	Singapore	111.36	8	72	111.59	2	45	did not advance					
76	82	Vėjas Pranskūnas	Lithuania	128.75	0	74	113.08	4	46	did not advance					
77	85	Mantas Atmanavičius	Lithuania	111.36	12	72	114.72	8	47	did not advance					
78	81	Tarık Tuğcu	Turkey	155.98	54	91	115.36	4	48	did not advance					
79	99	Marcos Gallegos	Chile	109.52	6	71	118.15	8	49	did not advance					
80	97	Tang Hung-Yuan	Chinese Taipei	134.11	10	80	118.28	0	50	did not advance					
81	95	Samuel Muchiri	Kenya	DSQ		101	120.52	2	51	did not advance					
82	101	Iain Rennie	South Africa	256.35	108	98	126.28	8	52	did not advance					
83	27	Gelindo Chiarello	Switzerland	91.61	6	55	132.70	52	53	did not advance					
84	84	Pradhyumna Singh Rathod	India	302.81	156	100	132.83	4	54	did not advance					
85	59	Roko Bengeri	Croatia	84.88	0	31	135.35	52	55	did not advance					
86	61	Kaelin Friedenson	United States	88.77	2	45	136.54	50	56	did not advance					
87	68	Maël Rivard	Canada	98.27	4	67	136.62	50	57	did not advance					
88	17	Marcello Beda	Italy	90.87	2	53	136.87	50	58	did not advance					
89	69	Thomas Ukalovic	Croatia	146.34	60	89	138.17	52	59	did not advance					
90	58	Ren Korpes	Croatia	91.97	2	59	138.36	50	60	did not advance					
91	62	Lucas Jacob	Portugal	87.33	2	39	138.50	52	61	did not advance					
92	98	Sam Oud	Netherlands	91.76	0	56	138.59	50	62	did not advance					
93	53	Huang Liman	China	91.78	6	57	139.62	56	63	did not advance					
94	67	Moritz Kremslehner	Austria	88.82	0	46	141.12	52	64	did not advance					
95	93	Guilherme Mapelli	Brazil	90.27	2	51	142.23	56	65	did not advance					
96	96	Fernando Reinoso	Mexico	161.74	8	93	145.10	14	66	did not advance					
97	75	João Cunha	Portugal	88.98	0	47	147.54	54	67	did not advance					
98	83	Edgars Gravitis	Latvia	106.99	0	70	148.62	54	68	did not advance					
99	86	Donovan Wewege	South Africa	104.40	2	69	154.95	54	69	did not advance					
100	91	Solomon Maragh	Jamaica	173.10	56	94	219.11	108	70	did not advance					
101	100	Scott Humphry	South Africa	159.57	14	92	310.55	160	71	did not advance					
