= 2023 ICF Canoe Slalom World Championships – Men's kayak cross =

Men's kayak cross at the 2023 ICF Canoe Slalom World Championships
- Venue: Lee Valley White Water Centre
- Location: London, United Kingdom
- Dates: 24 September 2023
- Competitors: 104 from 43 nations

Medalists
gold medal	Joseph Clarke	Great Britain
silver medal	Boris Neveu	France
bronze medal	Martin Dougoud	Switzerland

The men's kayak cross event at the 2023 ICF Canoe Slalom World Championships took place on 24 September 2023 at the Lee Valley White Water Centre in London.

== Competition format ==
The kayak cross event (formerly known as extreme kayak) is split into two phases - qualification time trials and knockout phase where 4 paddlers race each other head-to-head. Top 20 paddlers from the qualification advance to the knockout phase plus the 12 next fastest paddlers from countries that have not qualified in the top 20. There are 8 heats in the first round of the knockout phase with the top 2 paddlers from each heat advancing to the next round. The same rules apply in quarterfinals and semifinals.

Paddlers start their run by sliding off the starting platform several meters above the water. Then they must navigate the downstream and upstream gates. Unlike in classic slalom, paddlers are allowed to touch the gates and even intentionally move them with their paddle, but not with a free hand. There is also a designated zone where paddlers must perform an Eskimo roll.

Athletes can be penalized in three ways in each round, by receiving a fault (FLT) or by being ranked as lower (RAL). Faults are incurred for false starts, missing gates or failing to correctly perform the Eskimo roll. Athletes are ranked as lower (RAL) if they breach the safety requirements of the competition, such as by holding back another athlete with their hands or paddle, deliberately paddling over another athlete's boat, or by making dangerous contact with another athlete's head or body - all other non-dangerous contact is allowed. In each round athletes are ranked first by the order in which they cross the finish line, with those incurring penalties ranked in the following order: FLT, RAL, DNF, DNS.

The final classification of athletes is determined in the following manner: Athletes eliminated at any phase of the competition will be given their rank based on the comparison of the qualification times of athletes eliminated at the same phase. All 3rd ranked athletes will be ranked above all 4th ranked athletes. The final rank of athletes who did not progress to the heats is determined by their qualification results.

== Schedule ==
All times listed are UTC+1.

Date	Time	Round
24 September 2023
24 September 2023	09:53	Time trials
24 September 2023	12:19	Heats
24 September 2023	13:53	Quarterfinals
24 September 2023	14:20	Semifinals
24 September 2023	14:37	Final

== Results ==
=== Time trials ===
Top 20 qualify automatically. The last 12 spots go to fastest paddlers from countries not yet qualified.

Rank	Bib	Athlete	Country	Time	Notes
1	1	Joseph Clarke	Great Britain	71.24	Q
2	21	David Llorente	Spain	71.68	Q
3	9	Benjamin Renia	France	72.19	Q
4	6	Giovanni De Gennaro	Italy	72.74	Q
5	35	Martin Dougoud	Switzerland	72.75	Q
6	14	Felix Oschmautz	Austria	72.81	Q
7	3	Finn Butcher	New Zealand	72.95	Q
8	2	Dimitri Marx	Switzerland	73.00	Q
9	13	Hannes Aigner	Germany	73.03	Q
10	24	Christopher Bowers	Great Britain	73.18	Q
11	47	Lucien Delfour	Australia	73.44	Q
12	10	Jan Rohrer	Switzerland	73.83	Q
13	38	Jakub Krejčí	Czech Republic	73.89	Q
14	16	Boris Neveu	France	73.97	Q
15	45	Miquel Travé	Spain	74.03	Q
16	40	Jonny Dickson	Great Britain	74.09	Q
17	32	Titouan Castryck	France	74.43	Q
18	22	Etienne Chappell	Great Britain	74.48	Q
19	52	Quan Xin	China	74.66	Q
20	81	Tadeusz Kuchno	Poland	74.72	Q
21	7	Mario Leitner	Austria	74.73	FR: 33
22	5	Stefan Hengst	Germany	74.78	FR: 34
23	34	Gabriel De Coster	Belgium	75.02	Q
24	31	Alistair McCreery	Ireland	75.04	Q
25	19	Michał Pasiut	Poland	75.23	FR: 35
26	26	Ondřej Tunka	Czech Republic	75.36	FR: 36
27	17	Manuel Ochoa	Spain	75.42	FR: 37
28	15	Timothy Anderson	Australia	75.78	FR: 38
29	12	Pedro Gonçalves	Brazil	75.91	Q
30	8	Vid Kuder Marušič	Slovenia	76.09	Q
31	23	Alex Baldoni	Canada	76.09	Q
32	56	Maxime Aubertin	Belgium	76.27	FR: 39
33	83	Tristan Carter	Australia	76.35	FR: 40
34	41	Manuel Munsch	Switzerland	76.50	FR: 41
35	25	Erik Holmer	Sweden	76.74	Q
36	48	Mathieu Desnos	Brazil	76.75	FR: 42
37	20	Tine Kancler	Slovenia	76.96	FR: 43
38	42	Callum Gilbert	New Zealand	77.06	FR: 44
39	61	Žiga Lin Hočevar	Slovenia	77.17	FR: 45
40	85	Dariusz Popiela	Poland	77.69	FR: 46
41	49	Fredrik Wahlén	Sweden	77.94	FR: 47
42	73	Matías Contreras	Argentina	78.34	Q
43	44	Pau Echaniz	Spain	78.35	FR: 48
44	46	Mārtiņš Plaudis	Latvia	79.26	Q
45	91	Frederico Alvarenga	Portugal	79.31	Q
46	66	Adam Gonšenica	Slovakia	79.55	Q
47	64	Leonardo Proietti	Italy	80.05	FR: 49
48	51	Lorand Gjoshi	Kosovo	80.06	Q
49	18	Isak Öhrström	Sweden	80.20	FR: 50
50	89	Zhu Haoran	China	80.46	FR: 51
51	30	Andraz Echeverría Olguín	Chile	80.62	Q
52	63	Brodie Crawford	Australia	80.64	
53	82	Salim Ahmad Jemai	Tunisia	80.86	
54	77	Lucas Jacob	Portugal	81.03	
55	27	Kyler James Long	United States	82.05	
56	76	Lucas Rossi	Argentina	82.41	
57	59	Manuel Trípano	Argentina	82.79	
58	99	Guilherme Mapelli	Brazil	82.80	
59	67	Moritz Kremslehner	Austria	83.02	
60	65	Maël Rivard	Canada	83.11	
61	75	Ritvars Celmiņš	Latvia	83.36	
62	80	Kauã da Silva	Brazil	83.41	
63	68	Ren Korpes	Croatia	83.77	
64	29	Mateusz Polaczyk	Poland	83.93	
65	86	Bryson Long	United States	84.55	
66	71	Andy Barat	Comoros	85.08	
67	33	Mathis Soudi	Morocco	85.94	
68	50	Tren Long	United States	85.99	
69	92	Peter Kauzer	Slovenia	86.21	
70	74	Alexis Pérez	Venezuela	88.10	
71	72	Donovan Wewege	South Africa	88.42	
72	69	Djanibek Temirgaliev	Uzbekistan	89.53	
73	60	Edgars Gravitis	Latvia	90.21	
74	87	Liu Chin-han	Chinese Taipei	91.34	
75	103	Marcos Gallegos	Chile	91.83	
76	43	Jakub Grigar	Slovakia	93.36	
77	58	Alexandr Kulikov	Kazakhstan	95.84	
78	96	Luis Erazo	Venezuela	96.50	
79	95	Amir Rezanejad Hassanjani	ICF	96.63	
80	84	Samuel Muchiri	Kenya	98.50	
81	102	Scott Humphry	South Africa	102.78	
82	90	Fernando Reinoso	Mexico	104.40	
83	88	Pradhyumna Singh Rathod	India	120.47	
84	11	Vít Přindiš	Czech Republic	71.97	FLT (6)
85	55	Thomas Ukalovic	Croatia	82.19	FLT (6)
86	94	Mantas Atmanavičius	Lithuania	96.44	FLT (6)
87	36	Noah Hegge	Germany	74.23	FLT (5)
88	4	Anatole Delassus	France	75.84	FLT (5)
89	28	Kaelin Friedenson	United States	79.95	FLT (5)
90	93	Vilius Rasimavičius	Lithuania	81.65	FLT (5)
91	57	João Cunha	Portugal	85.92	FLT (5)
92	53	Antonio Reinoso	Mexico	101.78	FLT (5)
93	37	Trevor Boyd	Canada	91.00	FLT (R)
94	78	Solomon Maragh	Jamaica	97.34	FLT (R)
95	62	Nicolás Trípano	Argentina	84.96	FLT (3)
96	54	Huang Liman	China	75.32	FLT (1)
97	39	Martin Halčin	Slovakia	76.32	FLT (1)
98	79	Lukáš Rohan	Czech Republic	80.86	FLT (1)
99	70	Terence Saramandif	Mauritius	93.26	FLT (1, 5)
-	101	Iain Rennie	South Africa	-	DNF
-	97	Imangali Mambetov	Kazakhstan		DNS
-	100	Sam Oud	Netherlands		DNS
-	98	Tang Hung-Yuan	Chinese Taipei		DNS
-	104	Ioannis Zachos	Greece		DNS

=== Knockout rounds ===
Top 2 from each heat, quarterfinal and semifinal advance to the next round.

==== Heats ====
Heat 1

Rank	Bib	Athlete	Country	Notes
1	1	Joseph Clarke	Great Britain	Q
2	16	Jonny Dickson	Great Britain	Q
3	32	Andraz Echeverría Olguín	Chile	
4	17	Titouan Castryck	France	FLT (5)

Heat 2

Rank	Bib	Athlete	Country	Notes
1	8	Dimitri Marx	Switzerland	Q
2	25	Alex Baldoni	Canada	Q
3	9	Hannes Aigner	Germany	
4	24	Vid Kuder Marušič	Slovenia	FLT (2)

Heat 3

Rank	Bib	Athlete	Country	Notes
1	21	Gabriel De Coster	Belgium	Q
2	5	Martin Dougoud	Switzerland	Q
3	28	Mārtiņš Plaudis	Latvia	
4	12	Jan Rohrer	Switzerland	FLT (1)

Heat 4

Rank	Bib	Athlete	Country	Notes
1	4	Giovanni De Gennaro	Italy	Q
2	20	Tadeusz Kuchno	Poland	Q
3	29	Frederico Alvarenga	Portugal	
4	13	Jakub Krejčí	Czech Republic	RAL

Heat 5

Rank	Bib	Athlete	Country	Notes
1	14	Boris Neveu	France	Q
2	3	Benjamin Renia	France	Q
3	19	Quan Xin	China	FLT (1)
4	30	Adam Gonšenica	Slovakia	RAL

Heat 6

Rank	Bib	Athlete	Country	Notes
1	6	Felix Oschmautz	Austria	Q
2	11	Lucien Delfour	Australia	Q
3	22	Alistair McCreery	Ireland	
4	27	Matías Contreras	Argentina	

Heat 7

Rank	Bib	Athlete	Country	Notes
1	26	Erik Holmer	Sweden	Q
2	7	Finn Butcher	New Zealand	Q
3	10	Christopher Bowers	Great Britain	
4	23	Pedro Gonçalves	Brazil	

Heat 8

Rank	Bib	Athlete	Country	Notes
1	2	David Llorente	Spain	Q
2	18	Etienne Chappell	Great Britain	Q
3	31	Lorand Gjoshi	Kosovo	
4	15	Miquel Travé	Spain	

==== Quarterfinals ====
Quarterfinal 1

Rank	Bib	Athlete	Country	Notes
1	8	Dimitri Marx	Switzerland	Q
2	1	Joseph Clarke	Great Britain	Q
3	25	Alex Baldoni	Canada	FLT (5)
4	16	Jonny Dickson	Great Britain	FLT (3, 4)

Quarterfinal 2

Rank	Bib	Athlete	Country	Notes
1	5	Martin Dougoud	Switzerland	Q
2	21	Gabriel De Coster	Belgium	Q
3	4	Giovanni De Gennaro	Italy	
4	20	Tadeusz Kuchno	Poland	

Quarterfinal 3

Rank	Bib	Athlete	Country	Notes
1	3	Benjamin Renia	France	Q
2	14	Boris Neveu	France	Q
3	6	Felix Oschmautz	Austria	
4	11	Lucien Delfour	Australia	FLT (6)

Quarterfinal 4

Rank	Bib	Athlete	Country	Notes
1	2	David Llorente	Spain	Q
2	26	Erik Holmer	Sweden	Q
3	7	Finn Butcher	New Zealand	
4	18	Etienne Chappell	Great Britain	

==== Semifinals ====
Semifinal 1

Rank	Bib	Athlete	Country	Notes
1	5	Martin Dougoud	Switzerland	Q
2	1	Joseph Clarke	Great Britain	Q
3	21	Gabriel De Coster	Belgium	
4	8	Dimitri Marx	Switzerland	FLT (5)

Semifinal 2

Rank	Bib	Athlete	Country	Notes
1	14	Boris Neveu	France	Q
2	3	Benjamin Renia	France	Q
3	2	David Llorente	Spain	
4	26	Erik Holmer	Sweden	

==== Final ====
Rank	Bib	Athlete	Country	Notes
1st place, gold medalist(s)	1	Joseph Clarke	Great Britain	
2nd place, silver medalist(s)	14	Boris Neveu	France	
3rd place, bronze medalist(s)	5	Martin Dougoud	Switzerland	
4	3	Benjamin Renia	France	

=== Final ranking (Top 32) ===
The top 32 ranking determined by the knockout rounds. Bib numbers correspond to seeding after time trials.

Rank	Bib	Athlete	Country	Heat rank
1st place, gold medalist(s)	1	Joseph Clarke	Great Britain	1
2nd place, silver medalist(s)	14	Boris Neveu	France	2
3rd place, bronze medalist(s)	5	Martin Dougoud	Switzerland	3
4	3	Benjamin Renia	France	4
5	2	David Llorente	Spain	SF2 (3)
6	21	Gabriel De Coster	Belgium	SF1 (3)
7	8	Dimitri Marx	Switzerland	SF1 (4)
8	26	Erik Holmer	Sweden	SF2 (4)
9	4	Giovanni De Gennaro	Italy	QF2 (3)
10	6	Felix Oschmautz	Austria	QF3 (3)
11	7	Finn Butcher	New Zealand	QF4 (3)
12	25	Alex Baldoni	Canada	QF1 (3)
13	11	Lucien Delfour	Australia	QF3 (4)
14	16	Jonny Dickson	Great Britain	QF1 (4)
15	18	Etienne Chappell	Great Britain	QF4 (4)
16	20	Tadeusz Kuchno	Poland	QF2 (4)
17	9	Hannes Aigner	Germany	H2 (3)
18	10	Christopher Bowers	Great Britain	H7 (3)
19	19	Quan Xin	China	H5 (3)
20	22	Alistair McCreery	Ireland	H6 (3)
21	28	Mārtiņš Plaudis	Latvia	H3 (3)
22	29	Frederico Alvarenga	Portugal	H4 (3)
23	31	Lorand Gjoshi	Kosovo	H8 (3)
24	32	Andraz Echeverría Olguín	Chile	H1 (3)
25	12	Jan Rohrer	Switzerland	H3 (4)
26	13	Jakub Krejčí	Czech Republic	H4 (4)
27	15	Miquel Travé	Spain	H8 (4)
28	17	Titouan Castryck	France	H1 (4)
29	23	Pedro Gonçalves	Brazil	H7 (4)
30	24	Vid Kuder Marušič	Slovenia	H2 (4)
31	27	Matías Contreras	Argentina	H6 (4)
32	30	Adam Gonšenica	Slovakia	H5 (4)
