= Canoe slalom at the 2023 European Games – Men's K1 =

Men's kayak at the 2023 European Games
- Venue: Kraków-Kolna Canoe Slalom Course
- Date: 29 June - 1 July
- Competitors: 66 from 27 nations

Medalists
gold medal	Jiří Prskavec	Czech Republic
silver medal	Martin Dougoud	Switzerland
bronze medal	Joseph Clarke	Great Britain

The canoe slalom men's kayak event at the 2023 European Games took place on 1 July 2023 at the Kraków-Kolna Canoe Slalom Course in Kraków, with the qualification heats on 29 June 2023.

== Competition format ==
The event uses a three-round format with qualification heats, semifinal and final. Paddlers complete up to two runs in the heats, with the top ranked athletes starting last. In the first heat, the 30 fastest paddlers qualify automatically for the semifinal, whilst the rest compete in the second heat for additional 10 qualification spots. The final rank of non-qualifying athletes is determined by their second run score. Paddlers start in the reverse order of their heats position in the semifinal and complete a single run, with the top 10 advancing to the final. The start list for the final is once again in reverse order of the semifinal results. The athlete with the best time in the single-run final is awarded gold.

A penalty of 2 seconds is awarded for touching a gate and a 50-second penalty is awarded for missing a gate or negotiating it in the opposite direction.

An easier gate setup is generally used for the heats and then a more difficult one for semifinal and final.

== Schedule ==
All times are Central European Summer Time (UTC+2)

Date	Time	Round
29 June 2023
29 June 2023	09:35	Heats Run 1
29 June 2023	11:40	Heats Run 2
1 July 2023
1 July 2023	09:35	Semifinal
1 July 2023	12:40	Final

== Results ==
Penalties are included in the time shown. The fastest time in each round is shown in bold.

Rank	Bib	Athlete	Country	Heats						Semifinal			Final		
Rank	Bib	Athlete	Country	Run 1			Run 2			Semifinal			Final		
Rank	Bib	Athlete	Country	Time	Pen	Rank	Time	Pen	Rank	Time	Pen	Rank	Time	Pen	Rank
1st place, gold medalist(s)	1	Jiří Prskavec	Czech Republic	85.09	0	3	-			**88.97**	0	1	**88.21**	0	1
2nd place, silver medalist(s)	7	Martin Dougoud	Switzerland	**83.98**	0	1	-			90.57	2	3	89.60	0	2
3rd place, bronze medalist(s)	6	Joe Clarke	Great Britain	88.56	4	18	-			92.29	2	10	89.80	2	3
4	9	Felix Oschmautz	Austria	88.44	2	17	-			90.65	0	4	90.01	0	4
5	4	Giovanni De Gennaro	Italy	85.74	0	4	-			91.92	0	8	90.73	2	5
6	10	Jakub Grigar	Slovakia	87.51	0	9	-			92.01	0	9	91.74	2	6
7	16	Jakub Krejčí	Czech Republic	91.82	6	36	89.13	2	5	89.53	0	2	94.38	2	7
8	28	Pau Echaniz	Spain	87.84	2	11	-			90.96	0	7	96.46	4	8
9	22	Martin Halčin	Slovakia	90.11	2	26	-			90.95	0	6	97.95	2	9
10	19	Benjamin Renia	France	85.91	0	5	-			90.91	0	5	140.14	50	10
11	3	Peter Kauzer	Slovenia	88.20	0	15	-			92.44	2	11	did not advance		
12	8	Hannes Aigner	Germany	88.56	0	18	-			92.88	0	12	did not advance		
13	12	Miquel Travé	Spain	92.40	4	37	88.94	2	4	93.43	0	13	did not advance		
14	14	Marcello Beda	Italy	90.77	2	30	-			93.52	0	14	did not advance		
15	34	Xabier Ferrazzi	Italy	87.11	0	8	-			93.61	2	15	did not advance		
16	61	Mateusz Polaczyk	Poland	91.49	4	35	88.26	0	3	93.62	2	16	did not advance		
17	18	Dariusz Popiela	Poland	87.89	2	13	-			93.63	4	17	did not advance		
18	2	Vít Přindiš	Czech Republic	88.81	2	21	-			94.06	2	18	did not advance		
19	24	Michał Pasiut	Poland	90.88	2	31	91.54	0	8	94.53	0	19	did not advance		
20	11	Titouan Castryck	France	84.98	0	2	-			94.87	4	20	did not advance		
21	21	Gelindo Chiarello	Switzerland	88.33	0	16	-			95.08	0	21	did not advance		
22	15	Mario Leitner	Austria	90.50	0	28	-			95.22	2	22	did not advance		
23	25	Isak Öhrström	Sweden	87.86	2	12	-			96.05	2	23	did not advance		
24	33	Dimitri Marx	Switzerland	137.91	50	59	87.94	0	2	96.32	0	24	did not advance		
25	13	Noah Hegge	Germany	86.46	0	7	-			96.33	4	25	did not advance		
26	29	Adam Gonšenica	Slovakia	93.39	4	38	93.14	4	10	96.60	0	26	did not advance		
27	26	Gabriel De Coster	Belgium	90.71	2	29	-			97.58	6	27	did not advance		
28	31	Noel Hendrick	Ireland	89.10	0	23	-			98.06	0	28	did not advance		
29	32	Erik Holmer	Sweden	89.37	0	24	-			99.54	4	29	did not advance		
30	35	Žiga Lin Hočevar	Slovenia	95.08	6	41	92.55	4	9	100.12	4	30	did not advance		
31	40	Samuel Curtis	Ireland	90.20	0	27	-			102.52	4	31	did not advance		
32	30	Lan Tominc	Slovenia	89.72	0	25	-			104.40	10	32	did not advance		
33	5	Boris Neveu	France	87.82	0	10	-			108.56	2	33	did not advance		
34	36	Fredrik Wahlén	Sweden	147.76	54	61	90.14	0	6	109.02	10	34	did not advance		
35	27	Christopher Bowers	Great Britain	91.18	2	33	**86.99**	0	1	140.99	50	35	did not advance		
36	20	David Llorente	Spain	85.97	0	6	-			141.16	50	36	did not advance		
37	17	Stefan Hengst	Germany	88.83	0	22	-			142.83	52	37	did not advance		
38	23	Jonny Dickson	Great Britain	88.03	2	14	-			142.92	50	38	did not advance		
39	43	Ritvars Celmiņš	Latvia	96.00	4	42	91.19	0	7	153.33	54	39	did not advance		
40	41	Lorand Gjoshi	Kosovo	88.76	0	20	-			155.78	54	40	did not advance		
41	45	Oleksandr Fedorenko	Ukraine	98.80	4	45	93.26	2	11	did not advance					
42	47	Frederico Alvarenga	Portugal	96.92	0	43	93.76	2	12	did not advance					
43	48	Paul Preisl	Austria	94.74	2	40	94.02	0	13	did not advance					
44	37	Alistair McCreery	Ireland	91.35	2	34	94.13	6	14	did not advance					
45	64	Dirk Hermans	Netherlands	98.46	0	44	97.02	4	15	did not advance					
46	46	Serhii Sovko	Ukraine	94.45	0	39	98.63	4	16	did not advance					
47	38	Angel Petrushev	North Macedonia	90.99	0	32	99.12	4	17	did not advance					
48	52	Artem Ivchenko	Ukraine	100.37	4	47	99.75	8	18	did not advance					
49	57	Edgars Gravitis	Latvia	126.44	16	58	100.72	2	19	did not advance					
50	39	Ren Korpes	Croatia	99.97	4	46	100.88	4	20	did not advance					
51	44	Lucas Jacob	Portugal	145.45	52	60	101.58	2	21	did not advance					
52	58	Mārtiņš Plaudis	Latvia	164.88	58	62	101.64	4	22	did not advance					
53	49	Miloš Jevtić	Serbia	111.71	6	54	101.88	4	23	did not advance					
54	66	Marnix Teunissen	Netherlands	107.43	8	53	102.36	6	24	did not advance					
55	50	Mustafa Arda Acar	Turkey	104.88	6	50	102.78	4	25	did not advance					
56	56	Vuk Bazic	Serbia	105.13	4	51	105.19	4	26	did not advance					
57	55	Vilius Rasimavičius	Lithuania	114.82	12	56	112.66	6	27	did not advance					
58	59	Mantas Atmanavičius	Lithuania	114.43	8	55	113.00	6	28	did not advance					
59	63	Nils Biermans	Netherlands	107.19	6	52	116.26	6	29	did not advance					
60	60	Charalampos Troiannos	Greece	166.27	54	63	118.14	14	30	did not advance					
61	53	Yusuf Ertek	Turkey	115.24	4	57	120.20	6	31	did not advance					
62	54	Tarık Tuğcu	Turkey	101.50	2	49	154.75	50	32	did not advance					
63	51	Marko Đorđević	Serbia	100.78	2	48	158.13	56	33	did not advance					
-	42	Koppány Rácz	Hungary	DNS			DNS			did not advance					
-	62	Rimantas Pumputis	Lithuania	DNS			DNS			did not advance					
-	65	Emir Abdihodžić	Bosnia and Herzegovina	DSQ		64	DNS			did not advance					
