= 2022 ICF Canoe Slalom World Championships – Men's extreme kayak =

Men's extreme kayak at the 2022 ICF Canoe Slalom World Championships
- Venue: Augsburg Eiskanal
- Location: Augsburg, Germany
- Dates: 30-31 July 2022
- Competitors: 104 from 40 nations

Medalists
gold medal	Joseph Clarke	Great Britain
silver medal	Anatole Delassus	France
bronze medal	Stefan Hengst	Germany

The men's extreme kayak event at the 2022 ICF Canoe Slalom World Championships took place on 31 July 2022 at the Augsburg Eiskanal in Augsburg, with the time trials on 30 July 2022.

== Competition format ==
The extreme kayak event is split into two phases - qualification time trials and knockout phase where 4 paddlers race each other head-to-head. Top 20 paddlers from the qualification advance to the knockout phase plus the 12 next fastest paddlers from countries that have not qualified in the top 20. There are 8 heats in the first round of the knockout phase with the top 2 paddlers from each heat advancing to the next round. The same rules apply in quarterfinals and semifinals.

Paddlers start their run by sliding off the starting platform several meters above the water. Then they must navigate the downstream and upstream gates. Unlike in classic slalom, paddlers are allowed to touch the gates and even intentionally move them with their paddle, but not with a free hand. There is also a designated zone where paddlers must perform an Eskimo roll.

Athletes can be penalized in three ways in each round, by receiving a fault (FLT) or by being ranked as lower (RAL). Faults are incurred for false starts, missing gates or failing to correctly perform the Eskimo roll. Athletes are ranked as lower (RAL) if they breach the safety requirements of the competition, such as by holding back another athlete with their hands or paddle, deliberately paddling over another athlete's boat, or by making dangerous contact with another athlete's head or body - all other non-dangerous contact is allowed. In each round athletes are ranked first by the order in which they cross the finish line, with those incurring penalties ranked in the following order: FLT, RAL, DNF, DNS.

The final classification of athletes is determined in the following manner: Athletes eliminated at any phase of the competition will be given their rank based on the comparison of the qualification times of athletes eliminated at the same phase. All 3rd ranked athletes will be ranked above all 4th ranked athletes. The final rank of athletes who did not progress to the heats is determined by their qualification results.

== Schedule ==
All times are Central European Summer Time (UTC+2)

Date	Time	Round
30 July 2022
30 July 2022	17:20	Time trials
31 July 2022
31 July 2022	15:24	Heats
31 July 2022	16:21	Quarterfinals
31 July 2022	16:48	Semifinals
31 July 2022	17:05	Final

== Results ==
=== Time trials ===
Top 20 qualify automatically. The last 12 spots go to fastest paddlers from countries not yet qualified.

Rank	Bib	Athlete	Country	Time	Notes
1	2	Joseph Clarke	Great Britain	62.29	Q
2	11	Stefan Hengst	Germany	63.35	Q
3	43	Mateusz Polaczyk	Poland	63.55	Q
4	29	Alex Baldoni	Canada	63.61	Q
5	23	David Llorente	Spain	63.86	Q
6	40	Erik Holmer	Sweden	64.50	Q
7	37	Vojtěch Heger	Czech Republic	64.58	Q
8	10	Dimitri Marx	Switzerland	65.00	Q
8	13	Felix Oschmautz	Austria	65.00	Q
10	52	Timothy Anderson	Australia	65.05	Q
11	14	Giovanni De Gennaro	Italy	65.17	Q
12	3	Vít Přindiš	Czech Republic	65.19	Q
13	39	Manuel Ochoa	Spain	65.24	Q
14	96	Oleksandr Fedorenko	Ukraine	65.29	Q
15	7	Vid Kuder Marušič	Slovenia	65.52	Q
16	4	Finn Butcher	New Zealand	65.64	Q
17	58	Zack Mutton	New Zealand	65.65	Q
18	12	Hannes Aigner	Germany	65.97	Q
19	36	Tine Kancler	Slovenia	66.02	Q
20	69	Miquel Travé	Spain	66.03	Q
21	61	Jan Rohrer	Switzerland	66.15	FR: 33
22	6	Michał Pasiut	Poland	66.20	FR: 34
23	31	Marco Vianello	Italy	66.25	FR: 35
24	8	Bradley Forbes-Cryans	Great Britain	66.32	FR: 36
25	76	Mathis Soudi	Morocco	66.40	Q
26	26	Lucien Delfour	Australia	66.52	FR: 37
27	62	Anatole Delassus	France	66.53	Q
28	9	Joan Crespo	Spain	66.61	FR: 38
29	1	Mario Leitner	Austria	66.70	FR: 39
30	56	Ben Haylett	Great Britain	66.75	FR: 40
31	49	Zeno Ivaldi	Italy	66.98	FR: 41
32	18	Fredrik Wahlén	Sweden	67.14	FR: 42
33	19	Trevor Boyd	Canada	67.16	FR: 43
34	22	Ondřej Tunka	Czech Republic	67.19	FR: 44
35	85	Djanibek Temirgaliev	Uzbekistan	67.36	Q
36	15	Christopher Bowers	Great Britain	67.37	FR: 45
37	47	Yusuke Muto	Japan	67.42	Q
37	54	Gabriel De Coster	Belgium	67.42	Q
39	20	Alistair McCreery	Ireland	67.45	Q
40	24	Mathieu Desnos	Brazil	67.63	Q
41	67	Ren Korpes	Croatia	67.75	Q
42	55	Benjamin Pope	Australia	67.84	FR: 46
43	17	Boris Neveu	France	67.95	FR: 47
44	83	Martin Halčin	Slovakia	67.96	Q
45	75	George Snook	New Zealand	67.99	FR: 48
46	34	Isak Öhrström	Sweden	68.12	FR: 49
47	80	Ritvars Celmiņš	Latvia	68.13	Q
48	30	Maël Rivard	Canada	68.30	FR: 50
49	33	Jakub Grigar	Slovakia	68.39	FR: 51
50	57	Quan Xin	China	68.55	Q
51	88	Dariusz Popiela	Poland	68.69	FR: 52
52	79	Thomas Ukalovic	Croatia	68.79	FR: 53
53	70	Adam Gonšenica	Slovakia	68.81	FR: 54
54	68	Lorand Gjoshi	Kosovo	69.52	Q
55	51	Huang Liman	China	69.84	
56	101	Borche Mirchevski	North Macedonia	70.07	
57	63	Maxime Aubertin	Belgium	70.26	
58	59	Lyu Luhui	China	70.55	
58	64	Nour Ait Kaddour	Morocco	70.55	
60	78	Matej Beňuš	Slovakia	70.58	
61	72	Antonio Reinoso	Mexico	70.77	
62	35	Kaelin Friedenson	United States	70.85	
63	60	Yu Haijie	China	71.16	
64	94	Victor Hennin	Belgium	71.50	
65	38	Jean-Pierre Bourhis	Senegal	71.61	
66	48	Martin Srabotnik	Slovenia	72.64	
67	77	Terence Saramandif	Mauritius	73.47	
68	84	Edgars Gravitis	Latvia	73.48	
69	93	Yves Bourhis	Senegal	73.53	
70	97	Mantas Atmanavičius	Lithuania	73.60	
71	102	Eriberto Gutierrez Robles	Peru	73.87	
72	103	Thibaud Lacour	Romania	73.97	
73	27	Zachary Lokken	United States	75.32	
74	98	Vilius Rasimavičius	Lithuania	75.70	
75	42	Gaël Adisson	France	76.05	
76	71	Matteo-Alexander Olar	Romania	76.15	
77	81	Paul Preisl	Austria	77.68	
78	73	Barkamol Mirzakhamdamov	Uzbekistan	77.92	
79	99	Yuuki Tanaka	Japan	78.38	
80	86	Alexandr Kulikov	Kazakhstan	78.44	
81	92	Charalampos Troiannos	Greece	79.31	
82	89	Rahul Kewat	India	80.65	
83	104	Jhon Hunter Rodriguez Canela	Peru	82.25	
84	100	Solomon Maragh	Jamaica	82.59	
85	74	Patrick Kozma	Romania	90.56	
86	95	Pradhyumna Singh Rathod	India	93.03	
87	41	Jiří Prskavec	Czech Republic	72.90	FLT (5)
88	32	Kaylen Bassett	Australia	74.42	FLT (4)
89	45	Daniel Parry	Canada	74.84	FLT (4)
90	65	Mārtiņš Plaudis	Latvia	79.09	FLT (4)
91	28	Noah Hegge	Germany	63.96	FLT (3)
92	66	Guilherme Rodrigues	Brazil	67.58	FLT (3)
93	21	Callum Gilbert	New Zealand	76.81	FLT (3)
94	16	Gelindo Chiarello	Switzerland	65.21	FLT (1)
95	50	Théo Desvignes	France	65.91	FLT (1)
96	5	Pedro Gonçalves	Brazil	66.71	FLT (1)
97	46	Jakub Brzeziński	Poland	67.45	FLT (1)
98	25	Martin Dougoud	Switzerland	71.03	FLT (1)
99	82	Donovan Wewege	South Africa	74.84	FLT (1)
100	91	Artem Ivchenko	Ukraine	77.21	FLT (1)
101	87	Yevhenii Ivanov	Ukraine	78.06	FLT (1)
102	53	Vinzenz Hartl	Germany	65.12	FLT (R)
103	44	Serhii Sovko	Ukraine	-	DNF
-	90	Marko Đorđević	Serbia	-	DNS

=== Knockout rounds ===
==== Heats ====
Heat 1

Rank	Bib	Name	Country	Notes
1	17	Zack Mutton	New Zealand	Q
2	1	Joseph Clarke	Great Britain	Q
3	16	Finn Butcher	New Zealand	
4	32	Lorand Gjoshi	Kosovo	

Heat 2

Rank	Bib	Name	Country	Notes
1	9	Felix Oschmautz	Austria	Q
2	8	Dimitri Marx	Switzerland	Q
3	25	Gabriel De Coster	Belgium	
4	24	Yusuke Muto	Japan	

Heat 3

Rank	Bib	Name	Country	Notes
1	5	David Llorente	Spain	Q
2	21	Mathis Soudi	Morocco	Q
3	28	Ren Korpes	Croatia	
4	12	Vít Přindiš	Czech Republic	

Heat 4

Rank	Bib	Name	Country	Notes
1	13	Manuel Ochoa	Spain	Q
2	29	Martin Halčin	Slovakia	Q
3	4	Alex Baldoni	Canada	
4	20	Miquel Travé	Spain	FLT (4)

Heat 5

Rank	Bib	Name	Country	Notes
1	19	Tine Kancler	Slovenia	Q
2	3	Mateusz Polaczyk	Poland	Q
3	14	Oleksandr Fedorenko	Ukraine	
4	30	Ritvars Celmiņš	Latvia	DNF

Heat 6

Rank	Bib	Name	Country	Notes
1	11	Giovanni De Gennaro	Italy	Q
2	22	Anatole Delassus	France	Q
3	6	Erik Holmer	Sweden	
4	27	Mathieu Desnos	Brazil	FLT (4)

Heat 7

Rank	Bib	Name	Country	Notes
1	10	Timothy Anderson	Australia	Q
2	7	Vojtěch Heger	Czech Republic	Q
3	23	Djanibek Temirgaliev	Uzbekistan	
4	26	Alistair McCreery	Ireland	

Heat 8

Rank	Bib	Name	Country	Notes
1	2	Stefan Hengst	Germany	Q
2	15	Vid Kuder Marušič	Slovenia	Q
3	18	Hannes Aigner	Germany	
4	31	Quan Xin	China	

==== Quarterfinals ====
Quarterfinal 1

Rank	Bib	Name	Country	Notes
1	1	Joseph Clarke	Great Britain	Q
2	8	Dimitri Marx	Switzerland	Q
3	9	Felix Oschmautz	Austria	FLT (3)
4	17	Zack Mutton	New Zealand	FLT (R)

Quarterfinal 2

Rank	Bib	Name	Country	Notes
1	5	David Llorente	Spain	Q
2	29	Martin Halčin	Slovakia	Q
3	13	Manuel Ochoa	Spain	
4	21	Mathis Soudi	Morocco	FLT (3)

Quarterfinal 3

Rank	Bib	Name	Country	Notes
1	11	Giovanni De Gennaro	Italy	Q
2	22	Anatole Delassus	France	Q
3	3	Mateusz Polaczyk	Poland	
4	19	Tine Kancler	Slovenia	FLT (4)

Quarterfinal 4

Rank	Bib	Name	Country	Notes
1	2	Stefan Hengst	Germany	Q
2	10	Timothy Anderson	Australia	Q
3	7	Vojtěch Heger	Czech Republic	
4	15	Vid Kuder Marušič	Slovenia	

==== Semifinals ====
Semifinal 1

Rank	Bib	Name	Country	Notes
1	1	Joseph Clarke	Great Britain	Q
2	8	Dimitri Marx	Switzerland	Q
3	29	Martin Halčin	Slovakia	FLT (3)
4	5	David Llorente	Spain	FLT (R)

Semifinal 2

Rank	Bib	Name	Country	Notes
1	2	Stefan Hengst	Germany	Q
2	22	Anatole Delassus	France	Q
3	11	Giovanni De Gennaro	Italy	
4	10	Timothy Anderson	Australia	FLT (3)

==== Final ====
Rank	Bib	Name	Country	Notes
1st place, gold medalist(s)	1	Joseph Clarke	Great Britain	
2nd place, silver medalist(s)	22	Anatole Delassus	France	
3rd place, bronze medalist(s)	2	Stefan Hengst	Germany	
4	8	Dimitri Marx	Switzerland	

=== Final ranking (top 32) ===
The top 32 ranking determined by the knockout rounds. Bib numbers correspond to seeding after time trials.

Rank	Bib	Athlete	Country	Heat rank
1st place, gold medalist(s)	1	Joseph Clarke	Great Britain	1
2nd place, silver medalist(s)	22	Anatole Delassus	France	2
3rd place, bronze medalist(s)	2	Stefan Hengst	Germany	3
4	8	Dimitri Marx	Switzerland	4
5	11	Giovanni De Gennaro	Italy	SF2 (3)
6	29	Martin Halčin	Slovakia	SF1 (3)
7	5	David Llorente	Spain	SF1 (4)
8	10	Timothy Anderson	Australia	SF2 (4)
9	3	Mateusz Polaczyk	Poland	QF3 (3)
10	7	Vojtěch Heger	Czech Republic	QF4 (3)
11	9	Felix Oschmautz	Austria	QF1 (3)
12	13	Manuel Ochoa	Spain	QF2 (3)
13	15	Vid Kuder Marušič	Slovenia	QF4 (4)
14	17	Zack Mutton	New Zealand	QF1 (4)
15	19	Tine Kancler	Slovenia	QF3 (4)
16	21	Mathis Soudi	Morocco	QF2 (4)
17	4	Alex Baldoni	Canada	H4 (3)
18	6	Erik Holmer	Sweden	H6 (3)
19	14	Oleksandr Fedorenko	Ukraine	H5 (3)
20	16	Finn Butcher	New Zealand	H1 (3)
21	18	Hannes Aigner	Germany	H8 (3)
22	23	Djanibek Temirgaliev	Uzbekistan	H7 (3)
23	25	Gabriel De Coster	Belgium	H2 (3)
24	28	Ren Korpes	Croatia	H3 (3)
25	12	Vít Přindiš	Czech Republic	H3 (4)
26	20	Miquel Travé	Spain	H4 (4)
27	24	Yusuke Muto	Japan	H2 (4)
28	26	Alistair McCreery	Ireland	H7 (4)
29	27	Mathieu Desnos	Brazil	H6 (4)
30	30	Ritvars Celmiņš	Latvia	H5 (4)
31	31	Quan Xin	China	H8 (4)
32	32	Lorand Gjoshi	Kosovo	H1 (4)
