= 2023 ICF Canoe Slalom World Championships – Men's K1 team =

Men's kayak teams at the 2023 ICF Canoe Slalom World Championships
- Venue: Lee Valley White Water Centre
- Location: London, United Kingdom
- Dates: 19 September 2023
- Competitors: 90 from 30 nations
- Teams: 30

Medalists
gold medal	Jiří Prskavec; Vít Přindiš; Jakub Krejčí	Czech Republic
silver medal	Boris Neveu; Titouan Castryck; Benjamin Renia	France
bronze medal	Mateusz Polaczyk; Michał Pasiut; Dariusz Popiela	Poland

The men's kayak team event at the 2023 ICF Canoe Slalom World Championships took place on 19 September 2023 at Lee Valley White Water Centre in London.

== Competition format ==
Team events use a single run format with the team with the fastest time including penalties awarded gold. Teams consist of three paddlers from the same country.

Penalties are accumulated for each athlete, such that a team can incur a total of 150 seconds of penalties on a single gate (if all three miss it) or 6 seconds (if all three touch it). The time begins when the first paddler crosses the start beam and ends when the last one crosses the finish beam. All three paddlers must cross the finish line within 15 seconds of each other or else incur an additional 50-second penalty.

The teams had to navigate a total of 18 gates along the course, including 6 upstream gates (4-7-8-11-14-15).

== Results ==
Rank	Bib	Country	Athletes	Result		
Rank	Bib	Country	Athletes	Time	Pen	Total
1st place, gold medalist(s)	4	Czech Republic	Jiří Prskavec; Vít Přindiš; Jakub Krejčí	91.76	0	91.76
2nd place, silver medalist(s)	3	France	Boris Neveu; Titouan Castryck; Benjamin Renia	92.99	0	92.99
3rd place, bronze medalist(s)	9	Poland	Mateusz Polaczyk; Michał Pasiut; Dariusz Popiela	93.23	2	95.23
4	19	Italy	Giovanni De Gennaro; Xabier Ferrazzi; Marcello Beda	96.17	2	98.17
5	5	Slovakia	Jakub Grigar; Martin Halčin; Adam Gonšenica	96.22	2	98.22
6	23	Slovenia	Peter Kauzer; Martin Srabotnik; Žiga Lin Hočevar	96.70	2	98.70
7	1	Germany	Hannes Aigner; Noah Hegge; Stefan Hengst	99.55	0	99.55
8	10	Austria	Felix Oschmautz; Mario Leitner; Moritz Kremslehner	99.73	0	99.73
9	7	Australia	Lucien Delfour; Timothy Anderson; Benjamin Pope	98.11	2	100.11
10	11	Spain	David Llorente; Pau Echaniz; Miquel Travé	101.04	0	101.04
11	20	Switzerland	Martin Dougoud; Dimitri Marx; Gelindo Chiarello	100.77	2	102.77
12	6	Sweden	Isak Öhrström; Erik Holmer; Fredrik Wahlén	101.27	2	103.27
13	14	Brazil	Pedro Gonçalves; Guilherme Mapelli; Mathieu Desnos	100.26	4	104.26
14	17	Ireland	Noel Hendrick; Samuel Curtis; Alistair McCreery	102.36	2	104.36
15	15	Croatia	Roko Bengeri; Ren Korpes; Thomas Ukalovic	105.31	2	107.31
16	24	Portugal	Frederico Alvarenga; Lucas Jacob; João Cunha	105.46	2	107.46
17	25	Argentina	Matías Contreras; Lucas Rossi; Manuel Trípano	104.01	4	108.01
18	21	Latvia	Mārtiņš Plaudis; Ritvars Celmiņš; Edgars Gravitis	112.26	2	114.26
19	13	United States	Kaelin Friedenson; Joshua Joseph; Tyler Westfall	116.63	4	120.63
20	12	China	Quan Xin; Huang Liman; Zhu Haoran	122.62	6	128.62
21	22	Lithuania	Vilius Rasimavičius; Mantas Atmanavičius; Vėjas Pranskūnas	126.72	12	138.72
22	2	Great Britain	Joseph Clarke; Christopher Bowers; Jonny Dickson	93.20	50	143.20
23	16	Japan	Kazuya Adachi; Yuuki Tanaka; Yusuke Muto	97.77	56	153.77
24	8	Canada	Alex Baldoni; Trevor Boyd; Maël Rivard	113.26	56	169.26
25	18	Turkey	Mustafa Arda Acar; Yusuf Emir Ertek; Tarık Tuğcu	122.88	58	180.88
26	26	South Africa	Scott Humphry; Iain Rennie; Donovan Wewege	190.58	76	266.58
