= Canoe slalom at the 2023 European Games – Men's K1 team =

Men's kayak team at the 2023 European Games
- Venue: Kraków-Kolna Canoe Slalom Course
- Date: 29 June
- Competitors: 51 from 17 nations
- Teams: 17

Medalists
| gold medal | Pau Echaniz; David Llorente; Miquel Travé | Spain |
| silver medal | Dariusz Popiela; Mateusz Polaczyk; Michał Pasiut | Poland |
| bronze medal | Titouan Castryck; Boris Neveu; Benjamin Renia | France |

The canoe slalom men's kayak team event at the 2023 European Games took place on 29 June 2023 at the Kraków-Kolna Canoe Slalom Course in Kraków.

== Competition format ==
Team events use a single run format with the team with the fastest time including penalties awarded gold. Teams consist of three paddlers from the same country.

Penalties are accumulated for each athlete, such that a team can incur a total of 150 seconds of penalties on a single gate (if all three miss it) or 6 seconds (if all three touch it). The time begins when the first paddler crosses the start beam and ends when the last one crosses the finish beam. All three paddlers must cross the finish line within 15 seconds of each other or else incur an additional 50-second penalty.

Team events are generally contested on the same gate setup as the qualification heats of the individual events.

== Results ==
| Rank | Bib | Country | Athletes | Result | | |
| Rank | Bib | Country | Athletes | Time | Pen | Total |
|---|---|---|---|---|---|---|
| 1st place, gold medalist(s) | 7 | Spain | Pau Echaniz; David Llorente; Miquel Travé | 95.04 | 2 | 97.04 |
| 2nd place, silver medalist(s) | 2 | Poland | Dariusz Popiela; Mateusz Polaczyk; Michał Pasiut | 96.48 | 2 | 98.48 |
| 3rd place, bronze medalist(s) | 5 | France | Titouan Castryck; Boris Neveu; Benjamin Renia | 93.58 | 8 | 101.58 |
| 4 | 6 | Switzerland | Gelindo Chiarello; Martin Dougoud; Dimitri Marx | 99.83 | 2 | 101.83 |
| 5 | 8 | Italy | Giovanni De Gennaro; Xabier Ferrazzi; Marcello Beda | 95.95 | 6 | 101.95 |
| 6 | 3 | Germany | Hannes Aigner; Noah Hegge; Stefan Hengst | 96.90 | 6 | 102.90 |
| 7 | 12 | Austria | Felix Oschmautz; Mario Leitner; Paul Preisl | 101.09 | 2 | 103.09 |
| 8 | 11 | Slovenia | Peter Kauzer; Lan Tominc; Žiga Lin Hočevar | 97.10 | 6 | 103.10 |
| 9 | 4 | Slovakia | Jakub Grigar; Martin Halčin; Adam Gonšenica | 98.96 | 10 | 108.96 |
| 10 | 9 | Sweden | Fredrik Wahlén; Isak Öhrström; Erik Holmer | 101.23 | 8 | 109.23 |
| 11 | 16 | Latvia | Ritvars Celmiņš; Mārtiņš Plaudis; Edgars Gravitis | 113.79 | 10 | 123.79 |
| 12 | 14 | Serbia | Miloš Jevtić; Marko Đorđević; Vuk Bazic | 113.12 | 22 | 135.12 |
| 13 | 10 | Great Britain | Joe Clarke; Christopher Bowers; Jonny Dickson | 94.46 | 52 | 146.46 |
| 14 | 1 | Czechia | Jiří Prskavec; Vít Přindiš; Jakub Krejčí | 96.42 | 52 | 148.42 |
| 15 | 17 | Netherlands | Dirk Hermans; Marnix Teunissen; Nils Biermans | 113.69 | 60 | 173.69 |
| 16 | 13 | Ukraine | Oleksandr Fedorenko; Serhii Sovko; Artem Ivchenko | 111.11 | 64 | 175.11 |
| 17 | 15 | Turkey | Mustafa Arda Acar; Tarık Tuğcu; Yusuf Ertek | 120.56 | 68 | 188.56 |
