= Martin Halčin =

Slovak slalom canoeist (born 1991)

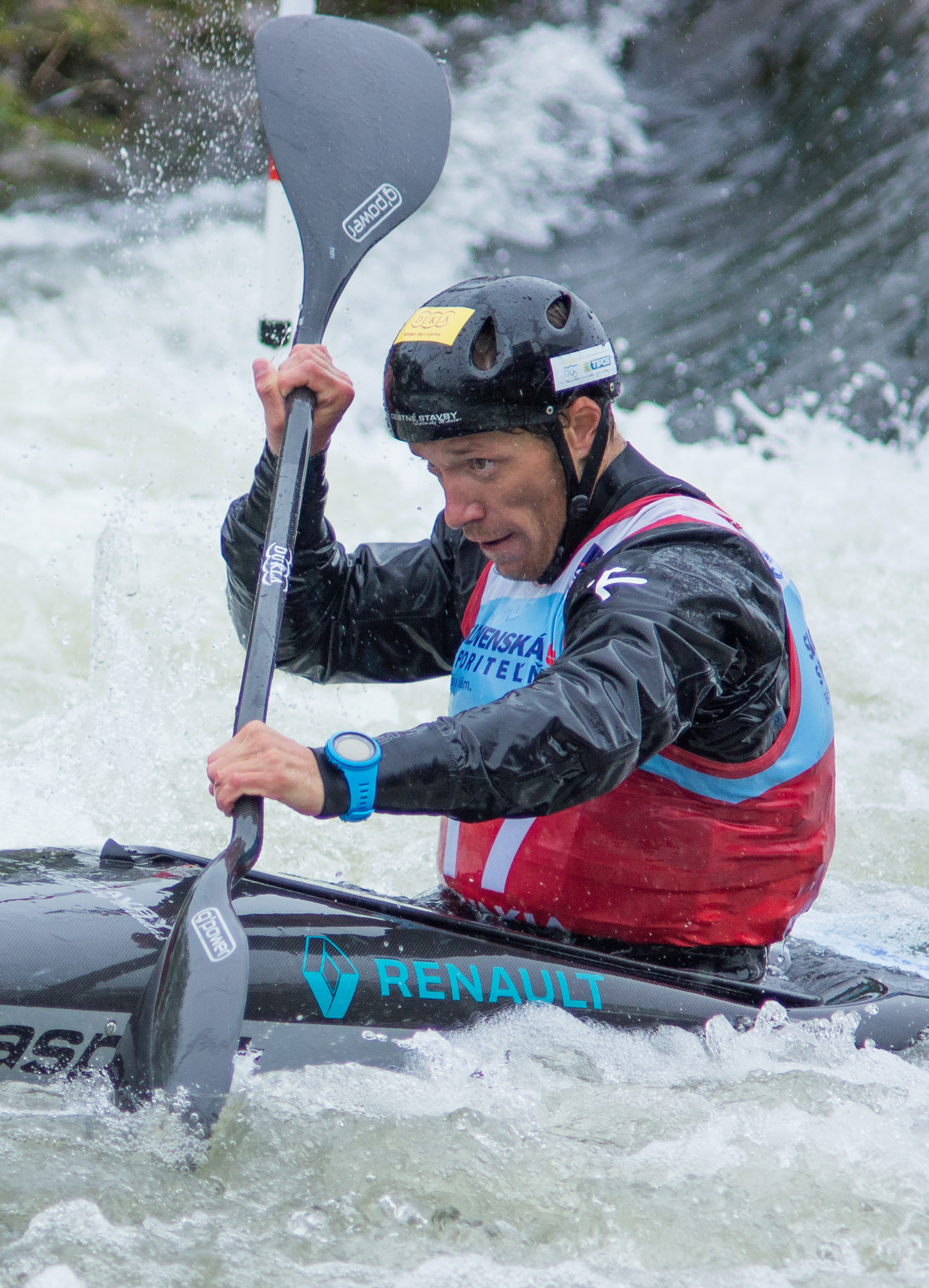
- Halčin at the 2016 European Championships

Personal information
- Nationality: Slovak
- Born: 22 May 1991 (age 35) Košice, Czechoslovakia
- Years active: 2008 -
- Height: 1.79 m (5 ft 10 in)
- Weight: 72 kg (159 lb)

Sport
- Country: Slovakia
- Sport: Canoe slalom
- Event: K1, Kayak cross
- Club: Dukla & KTK Liptovský Mikuláš
Medal record
Representing Slovakia
World Championships
| Silver medal – second place | 2015 London | K1 team |
| Silver medal – second place | 2021 Bratislava | K1 team |
U23 World Championships
| Bronze medal – third place | 2013 Liptovský Mikuláš | K1 team |
| Bronze medal – third place | 2014 Penrith | K1 team |
U23 European Championships
| Gold medal – first place | 2012 Solkan | K1 |
| Gold medal – first place | 2013 Bourg St. Maurice | K1 |
| Bronze medal – third place | 2012 Solkan | K1 team |
Junior World Championships
| Gold medal – first place | 2008 Roudnice nad Labem | K1 |
| Bronze medal – third place | 2008 Roudnice nad Labem | K1 team |
Junior European Championships
| Gold medal – first place | 2009 Liptovský Mikuláš | K1 |
| Bronze medal – third place | 2009 Liptovský Mikuláš | K1 team |

Martin Halčin (born 22 May 1991) is a Slovak slalom canoeist who has competed at the international level since 2008, specializing mostly in the K1 discipline. He occasionally competes in kayak cross as well.

He won two silver medals in the K1 team event at the ICF Canoe Slalom World Championships, earning them in 2015 and 2021.

He has won one World Cup medal, a silver in Kraków in 2015.

Halčin had a successful junior and under-23 career, winning the junior world title in K1 in 2008 and the European junior title in the same event in 2009. He is also a two-time under-23 European K1 champion from 2012 and 2013.

== Career statistics ==
=== Major championships results timeline ===
| Event | | 2011 | 2012 | 2013 | 2014 | 2015 | 2016 | 2017 | 2018 |
|---|---|---|---|---|---|---|---|---|---|
| World Championships | K1 | 38 | Not held | 42 | 11 | 26 | Not held | 25 | 18 |
| World Championships | Kayak cross | Not held | | | | | | — | — |
| World Championships | K1 team | 19 | Not held | 17 | 4 | 2 | Not held | 8 | 15 |
| European Championships | K1 | 8 | 26 | 25 | 4 | 15 | 37 | 26 | 19 |
| European Championships | Kayak cross | Not held | | | | | | | |
| European Championships | K1 team | 11 | 11 | 4 | 6 | 4 | 8 | 12 | 7 |

| Event | | 2019 | 2020 | 2021 | 2022 | 2023 | 2024 | 2025 | 2026 |
|---|---|---|---|---|---|---|---|---|---|
| World Championships | K1 | 41 | Not held | 43 | 47 | 30 | Not held | 15 | 44 |
| World Championships | Kayak cross | — | Not held | 66 | 6 | 97 | Not held | 32 | 21 |
| World Championships | Kayak cross individual | Not held | | | | | | 28 | 35 |
| World Championships | K1 team | 24 | Not held | 2 | 5 | 5 | Not held | 4 | 9 |
| European Championships | K1 | 19 | — | 15 | 29 | 9 (Note: 2023 European Games) | 44 | 36 | 39 |
| European Championships | Kayak cross | Not held | | — | — | 38 | 13 | NQ | NQ |
| European Championships | Kayak cross individual | Not held | | | | | 7 | 50 | DNS |
| European Championships | K1 team | 12 | — | 5 | 4 | 9 | 13 | 9 | 6 |

=== World Cup individual podiums ===
| Season | Date | Venue | Position | Event |
|---|---|---|---|---|
| 2015 | 27 Jun 2015 | Kraków | 2nd | K1 |
