= Canoe slalom at the 2023 European Games =

- Venue: Kraków-Kolna Canoe Slalom Course
- Dates: 29 June – 2 July
- Competitors: 181 from 29 nations

2023 European Championships

Canoe slalom events at the 2023 European Games were held at the Kraków-Kolna Canoe Slalom Course. A total of 10 medal events were contested, 5 for men and women each (C1, K1, Kayak cross, C1 team and K1 team).

It was the first time that canoe slalom was in the program of European Games. The competition was also the 24th edition of the European Canoe Slalom Championships.

== Qualification ==
Each NOC (National Olympic Committee) is allowed three quota spots in each individual event. Each NOC is also entitled to have one team in each team event.

== Schedule ==
OC	Opening ceremony	●	Event competitions	1	Event finals	CC	Closing ceremony

June/July	20th Tue	21st Wed	22nd Thu	23rd Fri	24th Sat	25th Sun	26th Mon	27th Tue	28th Wed	29th Thu	30th Fri	1st Sat	2nd Sun	Total events
Ceremonies		OC											CC	
Canoe slalom										2	2	2	4	10

All times listed are UTC+2.

Date	Starting Time	Events
29 June	09:35	K1M, K1W heats – 1st run
29 June	11:40	K1M, K1W heats – 2nd run
29 June	14:35	K1M, K1W teams
30 June	09:35	C1M, C1W heats – 1st run
30 June	11:05	C1M, C1W heats – 2nd run
30 June	13:35	C1M, C1W teams
1 July	09:35	K1M, K1W semifinals
1 July	12:40	K1M, K1W finals
1 July	15:05	Kayak cross Men & Women – Qualification
2 July	09:04	C1M, C1W semifinals
2 July	11:40	C1M, C1W finals
2 July	15:05	Kayak cross Men & Women – Quarterfinals
2 July	15:38	Kayak cross Men & Women – Semifinals
2 July	15:59	Kayak cross Men & Women – Finals

== Medal table ==
* Host nation (Poland)

Rank	NOC	Gold	Silver	Bronze	Total
1	Czech Republic	3	1	3	7
2	Germany	3	1	2	6
3	Great Britain	1	1	3	5
4	Spain	1	1	0	2
5	France	1	0	1	2
6	Ukraine	1	0	0	1
7	Poland*	0	3	0	3
8	Austria	0	1	0	1
8	Slovakia	0	1	0	1
8	Switzerland	0	1	0	1
11	Italy	0	0	1	1
Totals (11 entries)		10	10	10	30

== Medal summary ==
=== Men ===
Event	Gold		Silver		Bronze	
C1	Ryan Westley; Great Britain	94.01	Miquel Travé; Spain	95.16	Václav Chaloupka; Czech Republic	96.10
K1	Jiří Prskavec; Czech Republic	88.21	Martin Dougoud; Switzerland	89.60	Joe Clarke; Great Britain	89.80
Kayak cross	Ondřej Tunka; Czech Republic		Felix Oschmautz; Austria		Vít Přindiš; Czech Republic	
C1 team	Germany; Franz Anton; Sideris Tasiadis; Timo Trummer	101.69	Slovakia; Matej Beňuš; Marko Mirgorodský; Alexander Slafkovský	105.60	Great Britain; Adam Burgess; James Kettle; Ryan Westley	107.84
K1 team	Spain; Pau Echaniz; David Llorente; Miquel Travé	97.04	Poland; Michał Pasiut; Mateusz Polaczyk; Dariusz Popiela	98.48	France; Titouan Castryck; Boris Neveu; Benjamin Renia	101.58

=== Women ===
Event	Gold		Silver		Bronze	
C1	Elena Lilik; Germany	109.67	Klaudia Zwolińska; Poland	110.29	Mallory Franklin; Great Britain	113.63
K1	Ricarda Funk; Germany	99.09	Klaudia Zwolińska; Poland	101.06	Tereza Fišerová; Czech Republic	102.34
Kayak cross	Viktoriia Us; Ukraine		Ricarda Funk; Germany		Stefanie Horn; Italy	
C1 team	Czech Republic; Tereza Fišerová; Tereza Kneblová; Gabriela Satková	117.54	Great Britain; Mallory Franklin; Sophie Ogilvie; Kimberley Woods	120.34	Germany; Nele Bayn; Andrea Herzog; Elena Lilik	121.60
K1 team	France; Marjorie Delassus; Camille Prigent; Emma Vuitton	108.87	Czech Republic; Tereza Fišerová; Antonie Galušková; Amálie Hilgertová	111.75	Germany; Emily Apel; Ricarda Funk; Elena Lilik	113.17

== 2024 Summer Olympics qualification ==
The competitions also served as qualification for the 2024 Summer Olympics. The results were evaluated retroactively after the completion of the global qualification event, the 2023 ICF Canoe Slalom World Championships. There was one quota spot available in K1 and C1 each, but no quota spots in kayak cross. The quota were ultimately earned by Austria (men's kayak), the Netherlands (men's canoe), Ireland (women's kayak) and Slovenia (women's canoe).
