= Adam Gonšenica =

Slovak slalom canoeist

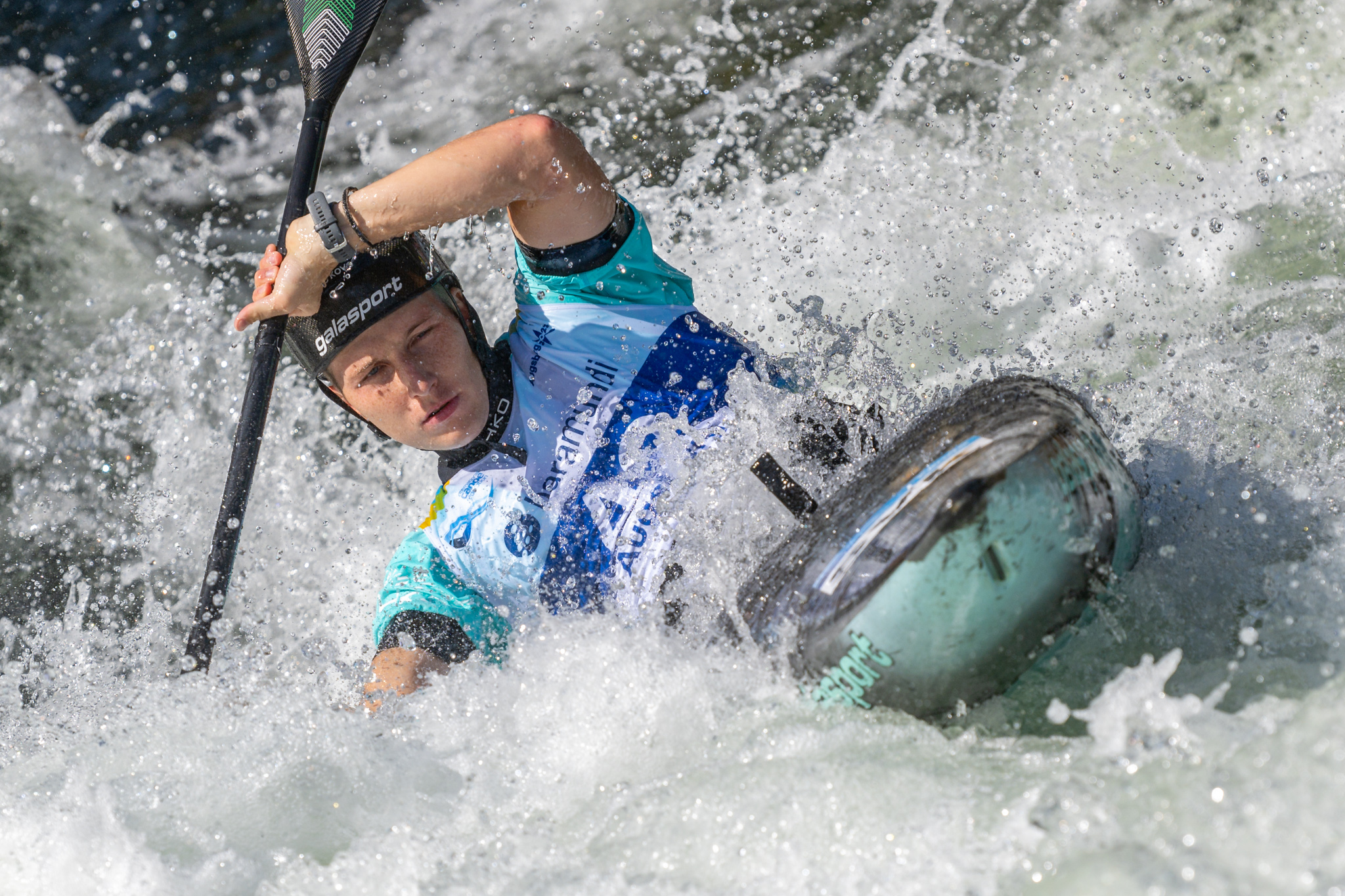
- Adam Gonšenica performing at 2022 ICF Canoe Slalom World Championships in Augsburg, Germany

Personal information
- Nationality: Slovak
- Born: 21 October 1999 (age 26) Liptovský Mikuláš, Slovakia

Sport
- Country: Slovakia
- Sport: Canoe slalom
- Event: K1, Kayak cross
- Club: KTK Liptovský Mikuláš
Medal record
Men's canoe slalom
Representing Slovakia
World Championships
| Silver medal – second place | 2021 Bratislava | K1 team |
Junior European Championships
| Silver medal – second place | 2017 Hohenlimburg | K1 |

Adam Gonšenica (born 21 October 1999) is a Slovak slalom canoeist who has competed at the international level since 2014, specializing primarily in the K1 discipline with occasional starts in kayak cross.

He won a silver medal in the K1 team event at the 2021 World Championships in Bratislava.

== Major championships results timeline ==
| Event | | 2021 | 2022 | 2023 | 2024 | 2025 | 2026 |
|---|---|---|---|---|---|---|---|
| World Championships | K1 | 14 | 31 | 18 | Not held | 34 | 75 |
| World Championships | Kayak cross | 49 | 54 | 32 | Not held | NQ | — |
| World Championships | Kayak cross individual | Not held | | | | 61 | — |
| World Championships | K1 team | 2 | 5 | 5 | Not held | 4 | 9 |
| European Championships | K1 | 8 | 20 | 26 (Note: 2023 European Games) | 35 | 34 | 34 |
| European Championships | Kayak cross | 20 | 34 | — | — | NQ | — |
| European Championships | Kayak cross individual | Not held | | | — | 38 | — |
| European Championships | K1 team | 5 | 4 | 9 | 13 | 9 | 6 |
