= 2025 European Canoe Slalom Championships =

2025 ECA Canoe Slalom European Championships
- Venue: Vaires-sur-Marne Nautical Stadium
- Location: Vaires-sur-Marne, France
- Dates: 15 to 18 May 2025

The 2025 European Canoe Slalom Championships took from 15 to 18 May in Vaires-sur-Marne, France under the auspices of the European Canoe Association (ECA). It was the 26th edition of the competition. Vaires-sur-Marne, venue of the 2024 Summer Olympics, hosted the event for the first time.

The qualification system of the previous years changed for these championships. There was only one run of qualification in classic slalom events with top 30 boats in each category advancing to the semifinals. The top 12 boats from the semifinals then advanced to the finals.

Russian athletes were permitted to compete as independent athletes.

Andorra and Belgium won their first ever medals at the European Canoe Slalom Championships courtesy of Mònica Dòria and Gabriel De Coster respectively.

== Medals Table ==
* Host nation (France)

Rank	Nation	Gold	Silver	Bronze	Total
1	Czech Republic	4	1	1	6
2	France*	2	9	2	13
3	Germany	2	0	0	2
4	Spain	1	1	1	3
5	Great Britain	1	0	3	4
6	Andorra	1	0	0	1
6	Belgium	1	0	0	1
8	Slovenia	0	1	2	3
9	Slovakia	0	0	2	2
10	Italy	0	0	1	1
Totals (10 entries)		12	12	12	36

== Medal summary ==
=== Men ===
==== Canoe ====
Event	Gold		Silver		Bronze	
C1	Miquel Travé; Spain	87.32	Nicolas Gestin; France	88.86	Žiga Lin Hočevar; Slovenia	89.01
C1 team	Great Britain; Adam Burgess; Ryan Westley; Luc Royle	91.27	Slovenia; Luka Božič; Žiga Lin Hočevar; Benjamin Savšek	92.81	Slovakia; Matej Beňuš; Marko Mirgorodský; Michal Martikán	94.75

==== Kayak ====
Event	Gold		Silver		Bronze	
K1	Jiří Prskavec; Czech Republic	80.03	Titouan Castryck; France	81.24	Martin Srabotnik; Slovenia	81.91
K1 team	Germany; Noah Hegge; Stefan Hengst; Hannes Aigner	85.89	France; Titouan Castryck; Benjamin Renia; Anatole Delassus	86.73	Spain; Pau Echaniz; Miquel Travé; David Llorente	87.40
Kayak cross individual	Gabriel De Coster; Belgium	53.80	Mathurin Madoré; France	54.14	Benjamin Renia; France	54.31
Kayak cross	Jakub Krejčí; Czech Republic		Benjamin Renia; France		Sam Leaver; Great Britain	

=== Women ===
==== Canoe ====
Event	Gold		Silver		Bronze	
C1	Mònica Dòria; Andorra	103.73	Laurène Roisin; France	106.76	Doriane Delassus; France	107.23
C1 team	Czech Republic; Gabriela Satková; Martina Satková; Adriana Morenová	103.00	France; Angèle Hug; Laurène Roisin; Doriane Delassus	105.28	Italy; Elena Borghi; Marta Bertoncelli; Elena Micozzi	107.44

==== Kayak ====
Event	Gold		Silver		Bronze	
K1	Ricarda Funk; Germany	89.36	Gabriela Satková; Czech Republic	92.59	Zuzana Paňková; Slovakia	93.67
K1 team	Czech Republic; Gabriela Satková; Lucie Nesnídalová; Antonie Galušková	98.86	Spain; Maialen Chourraut; Laia Sorribes; Leire Goñi	100.50	Great Britain; Kimberley Woods; Lois Leaver; Nikita Setchell	101.22
Kayak cross individual	Camille Prigent; France	58.10	Angèle Hug; France	59.22	Kimberley Woods; Great Britain	59.33
Kayak cross	Camille Prigent; France		Emma Vuitton; France		Olga Samková; Czech Republic	
