= Sam Oud =

Dutch slalom canoeist (born 1978)

Medal record

Men's canoe slalom

Representing Netherlands

World Championships
| Silver medal – second place | 2003 Augsburg | K1 team |

Junior World Championships
| Gold medal – first place | 1996 Lipno | K1 |

Samuel Victor Alexander Oud (born 3 September 1978 in Woerden) is a Dutch slalom canoeist who competed at the international level from 1995 to 2005.

Oud won a silver medal in the K1 team event at the 2003 ICF Canoe Slalom World Championships in Augsburg. He represented the Netherlands at the 2004 Summer Olympics in Athens, where he finished in eighth in the K1 event.
