= Matías Contreras =

Argentine footballer

Personal information
- Full name: Matías Gabriel Contreras
- Date of birth: 18 November 1994 (age 31)
- Place of birth: Tunuyán, Argentina
- Height: 1.93 m (6 ft 4 in)
- Position: Defender

Team information
- Current team: San Martín Mendoza
- Number: 13

Youth career
- Godoy Cruz

Senior career*
Years	Team	Apps	(Gls)
2014–2018	Godoy Cruz	0	(0)
2016–2017	→ Estudiantes BA (loan)	33	(3)
2017	→ Tigre (loan)	0	(0)
2018	→ Deportivo Cuenca (loan)	7	(0)
2018–2019	Estudiantes BA	29	(1)
2019–2020	Los Andes	24	(0)
2020–2021	Güemes	0	(0)
2021	Deportivo Riestra	6	(0)
2022–2023	Huracán Las Heras	58	(1)
2023–2024	FADEP	6	(0)
2024	Defensores Unidos	19	(0)
2025	Deportes Antofagasta	16	(1)
2026–	San Martín Mendoza	0	(0)
- * Club domestic league appearances and goals as of 24 March 2026

Matías Gabriel Contreras (born 18 November 1994) is an Argentine professional footballer who plays as a defender for San Martín de Mendoza.

== Club career ==
Born in Tunuyán, Argentina, Contreras is a product of Godoy Cruz. From 2016 to 2018, he was loaned out to Estudiantes de Buenos Aires and Tigre in his homeland and Deportivo Cuenca in the Ecuadorian Serie A.

In 2018, Contreras rejoined Estudiantes de Buenos Aires. The next years, he played for Los Andes, Güemes, Deportivo Riestra, Huracán Las Heras, Fundación Amigos por el Deporte (FADEP) and Defensores Unidos in his homeland.

In 2025, Contreras moved abroad again and joined Chilean club Deportes Antofagasta.

Back to Argentina, Contreras joined San Martín de Mendoza in the Torneo Federal A on 28 January 2026.
