= Titouan Castryck =

French slalom canoeist (born 2004)

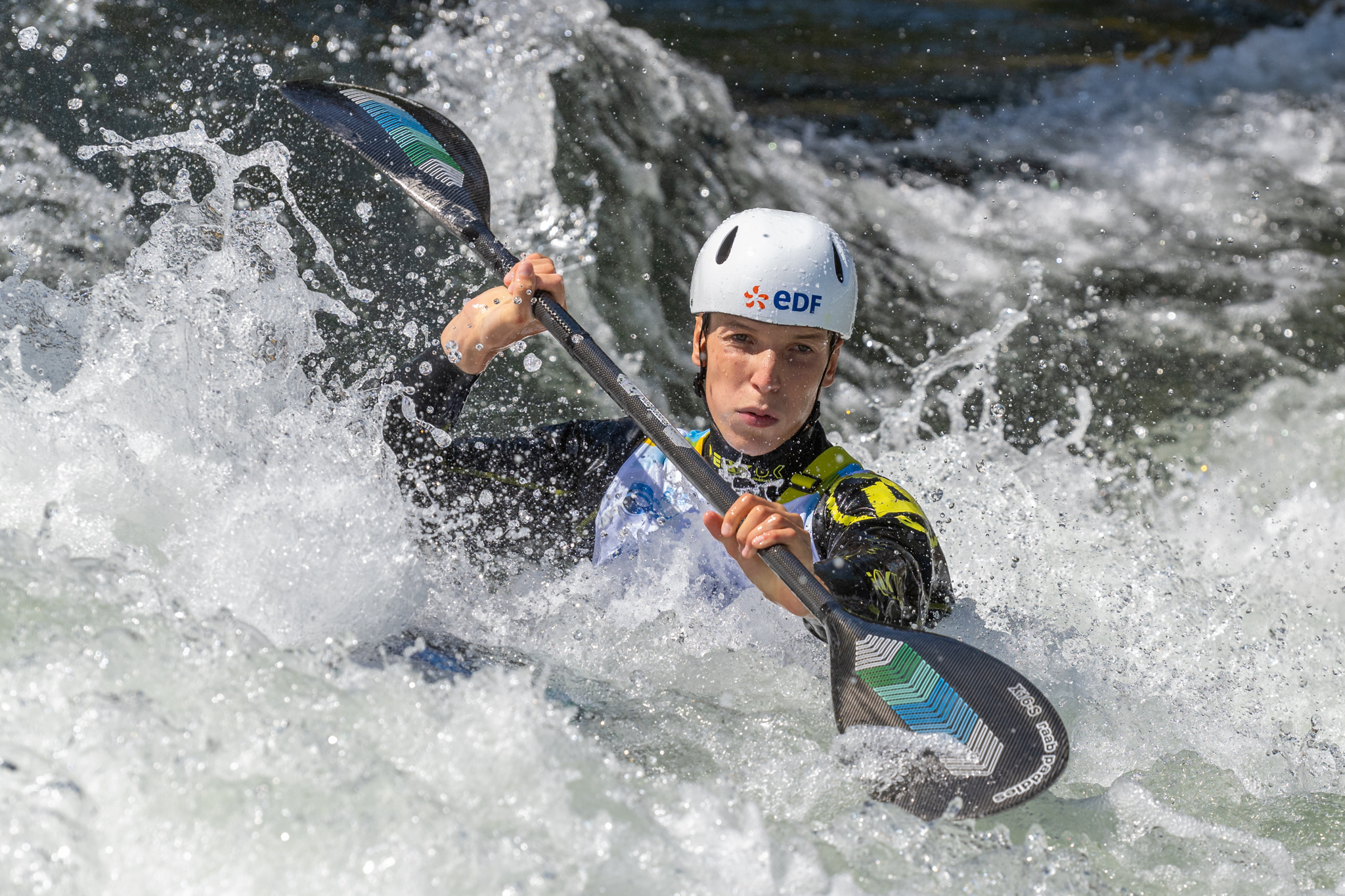
- Castryck in 2022

Personal information
- Nationality: French
- Born: 28 August 2004 (age 22) Saint-Malo, France

Sport
- Country: France
- Sport: Canoe slalom
- Event: K1, Kayak cross
Medal record
Men's canoe slalom
Representing France
Olympic Games
Silver medal – second place	2024 Paris	K1
World Championships
Gold medal – first place	2025 Penrith	K1
Gold medal – first place	2025 Penrith	K1 team
Silver medal – second place	2023 London	K1 team
Bronze medal – third place	2022 Augsburg	K1 team
European Games
Bronze medal – third place	2023 Kraków	K1 team
European Championships
Gold medal – first place	2026 Ivrea	K1 team
Silver medal – second place	2025 Vaires-sur-Marne	K1
Silver medal – second place	2025 Vaires-sur-Marne	K1 team
Bronze medal – third place	2024 Tacen	K1 team
U23 World Championships
Gold medal – first place	2023 Kraków	K1 team
Gold medal – first place	2025 Foix	K1
Silver medal – second place	2025 Foix	Kayak cross
Silver medal – second place	2025 Foix	K1 team
Bronze medal – third place	2023 Kraków	K1
Junior World Championships
Gold medal – first place	2021 Tacen	K1
Gold medal – first place	2022 Ivrea	K1
Silver medal – second place	2022 Ivrea	K1 team
Bronze medal – third place	2021 Tacen	K1 team
Junior European Championships
Gold medal – first place	2022 České Budějovice	K1
Gold medal – first place	2022 České Budějovice	Kayak cross

Titouan Castryck (born 28 August 2004) is a French slalom canoeist who has competed at the international level since 2021.

He competed at the 2024 Summer Olympics in Paris where he won a silver medal in the K1 event and finished 9th in kayak cross.

He won four medals at the World Championships with two golds (K1: 2025, K1 team: 2025) a silver (K1 team: 2023) and a bronze (K1 team: 2022). He also won five medals (one gold, two silvers and two bronzes) at the European Championships, including a bronze in the K1 team event at the 2023 European Games in Kraków.

Castryck is the overall World Cup champion in K1 from 2025.

== World Cup individual podiums ==
Season	Date	Venue	Position	Event
2023	11 June 2023	Prague	3rd	Kayak cross
2023	7 October 2023	Vaires-sur-Marne	1st	K1
2025	6 June 2025	La Seu d'Urgell	1st	K1
2025	28 June 2025	Prague	1st	K1
2025	29 August 2025	Tacen	1st	K1
2025	5 September 2025	Augsburg	3rd	K1
2026	3 September 2026	Vaires-sur-Marne	2nd	K1
2026	11 September 2026	La Seu d'Urgell	1st	K1
