= Callum Gilbert =

New Zealand canoeist

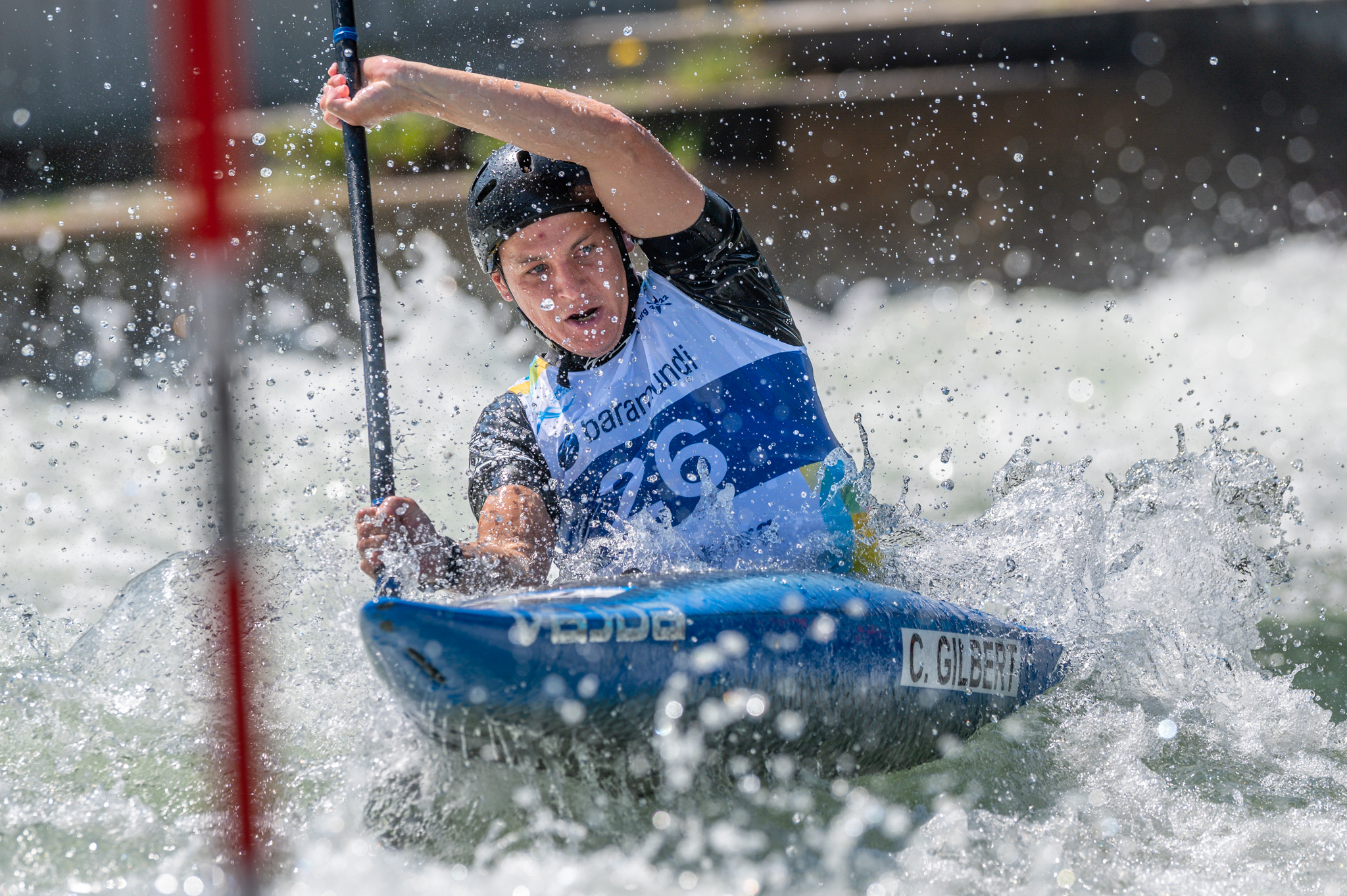
- Gilbert at 2022 World Championships

Personal information
- Born: 15 January 1996 (age 30)

Sport
- Country: New Zealand
- Sport: Canoe slalom

Callum Gilbert (born 15 January 1996) is a New Zealand slalom canoeist who has competed at the international level since 2013.

Gilbert represented New Zealand in the K1 event at the delayed 2020 Tokyo Olympics, where he finished 23rd after being eliminated in the heats. His selection followed a strong performance on the 2019 ICF World Cup Tour, where he made it to three of the four semifinals, with the best result of fifth-place. This result was the best kiwi male finish in a World Cup K1 event. Gilbert gave up his job as a software engineer to focus on qualifying for the Olympics. Gilbert had just missed out on qualifying for the 2016 Olympics at the last race before selection, missed out on a final at a World Cup event in 2019 by .01 of a second.

He was educated at Tauranga Boys' College, and lives by Okere Falls, by the shores of Lake Rotoiti, in the Bay of Plenty.
