= Boris Neveu =

French slalom canoeist (born 1986)

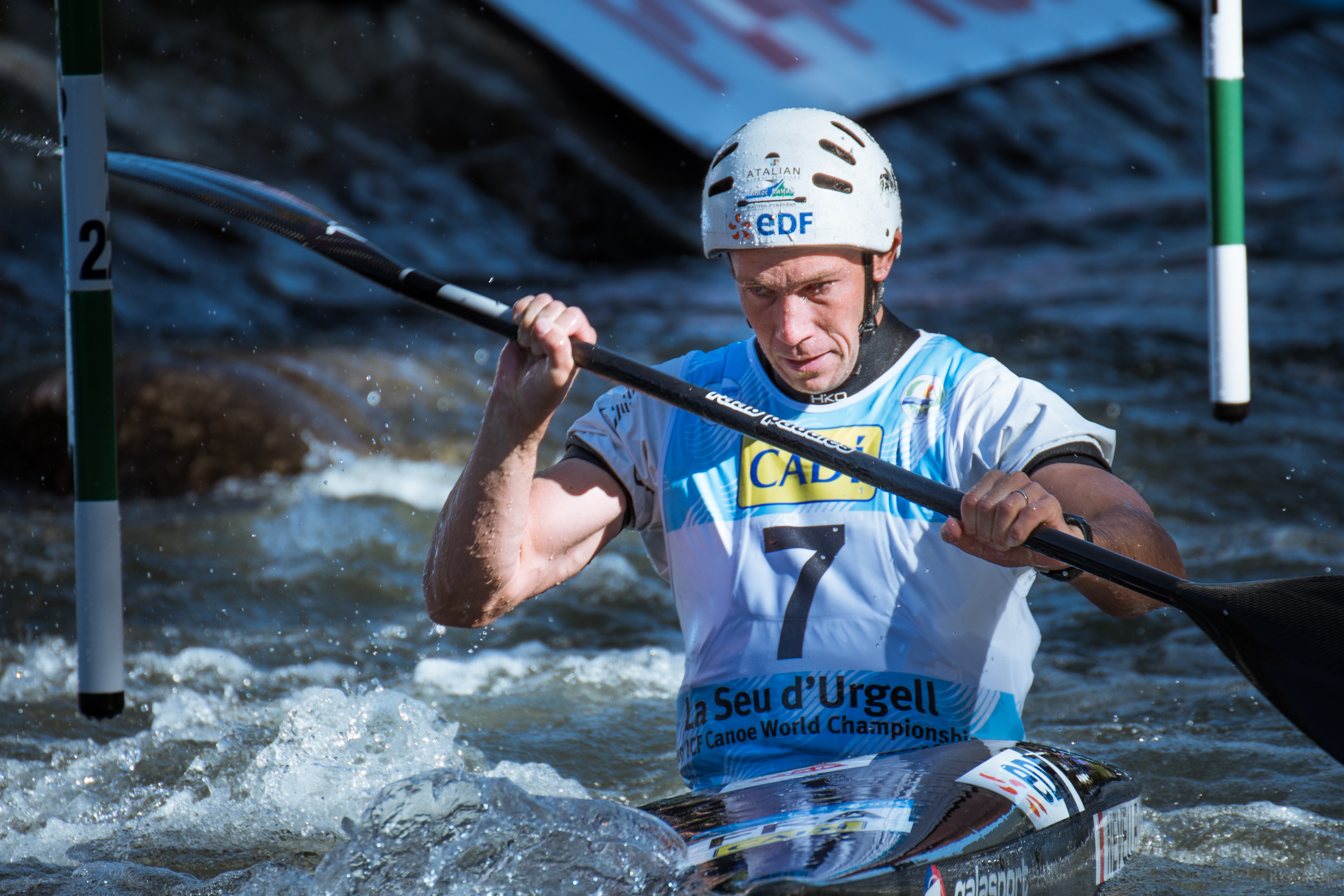

Personal information
- Nationality: French
- Born: 12 April 1986 (age 40) Lourdes, France
- Height: 1.85 m (6 ft 1 in)
- Weight: 78 kg (172 lb)

Sport
- Country: France
- Sport: Canoe slalom
- Event: K1, Kayak cross
- Club: ALCK Bagneres-de-Bigorre

Achievements and titles
- Highest world ranking: No. 1 (2015)
Medal record
Men's canoe slalom
Representing France
World Championships
Gold medal – first place	2006 Prague	K1 team
Gold medal – first place	2014 Deep Creek Lake	K1
Gold medal – first place	2014 Deep Creek Lake	K1 team
Gold medal – first place	2021 Bratislava	K1
Gold medal – first place	2021 Bratislava	K1 team
Silver medal – second place	2009 La Seu d'Urgell	K1
Silver medal – second place	2010 Tacen	K1 team
Silver medal – second place	2011 Bratislava	K1 team
Silver medal – second place	2017 Pau	K1 team
Silver medal – second place	2017 Pau	Kayak cross
Silver medal – second place	2018 Rio de Janeiro	Kayak cross
Silver medal – second place	2023 London	Kayak cross
Silver medal – second place	2023 London	K1 team
Bronze medal – third place	2013 Prague	K1 team
Bronze medal – third place	2022 Augsburg	K1
Bronze medal – third place	2022 Augsburg	K1 team
European Games
Bronze medal – third place	2023 Kraków	K1 team
European Championships
Gold medal – first place	2012 Augsburg	K1 team
Gold medal – first place	2015 Markkleeberg	K1
Gold medal – first place	2020 Prague	K1 team
Silver medal – second place	2009 Nottingham	K1
Silver medal – second place	2016 Liptovský Mikuláš	K1 team
Silver medal – second place	2017 Tacen	K1 team
Bronze medal – third place	2009 Nottingham	K1 team
Bronze medal – third place	2011 La Seu d'Urgell	K1 team
U23 European Championships
Gold medal – first place	2009 Liptovský Mikuláš	K1 team
Silver medal – second place	2009 Liptovský Mikuláš	K1
Junior World Championships
Gold medal – first place	2004 Lofer	K1 team

Boris Neveu (born 12 April 1986) is a French slalom canoeist who has competed at the international level since 2004, specializing in K1 and kayak cross.

He is a two-time individual K1 world champion and a two-time Olympian.

== Biography ==
Neveu won 16 medals at the ICF Canoe Slalom World Championships with five golds (K1: 2014, 2021; K1 team: 2006, 2014, 2021), eight silvers (K1: 2009; Kayak cross: 2017, 2018, 2023; K1 team: 2010, 2011, 2017, 2023) and three bronzes (K1: 2022; K1 team: 2013, 2022).

He also won nine medals at the European Championships (3 golds, 3 silvers and 3 bronzes), including a bronze in the K1 team event at the 2023 European Games in Kraków.

Neveu competed at two Olympic Games. He finished 7th in the K1 event at the 2020 Summer Olympics in Tokyo and 7th again in kayak cross at the 2024 Summer Olympics in Paris.

Neveu finished 4th in the overall World Cup standings twice (2015, 2019), and 5th twice (2014, 2021). He finished the 2015 season as the World No. 1 in the K1 event.

== World Cup individual podiums ==
	1st place, gold medalist(s)	2nd place, silver medalist(s)	3rd place, bronze medalist(s)	Total
K1	2	6	5	13
Kayak cross	3	1	1	5
Total	5	7	6	18

Season	Date	Venue	Position	Event
2005	16 July 2005	Augsburg	3rd	K1
2009	28 June 2009	Pau	2nd	K1
2011	9 July 2011	Markkleeberg	2nd	K1
2012	1 September 2012	Bratislava	2nd	K1
2014	7 June 2014	Lee Valley	1st	K1
2014	2 August 2014	La Seu d'Urgell	2nd	K1
2015	20 June 2015	Prague	2nd	K1
2015	8 August 2015	La Seu d'Urgell	1st	K1
2017	9 September 2017	La Seu d'Urgell	2nd	K1
2018	30 September 2018	Rio de Janeiro	2nd	Kayak cross^{1}
2019	23 June 2019	Bratislava	3rd	K1
2019	8 September 2019	Prague	3rd	K1
2021	19 June 2021	Markkleeberg	3rd	K1
2021	5 September 2021	La Seu d'Urgell	1st	Kayak cross
2022	27 August 2022	Pau	3rd	K1
2022	28 August 2022	Pau	1st	Kayak cross
2023	8 October 2023	Vaires-sur-Marne	1st	Kayak cross
2024	9 June 2024	Prague	3rd	Kayak cross^{2}

^{1} World Championship counting for World Cup points
^{2} 2024 Olympic qualifier. Did not count for World Cup rankings.
