= Pau Echaniz =

Spanish kayaker

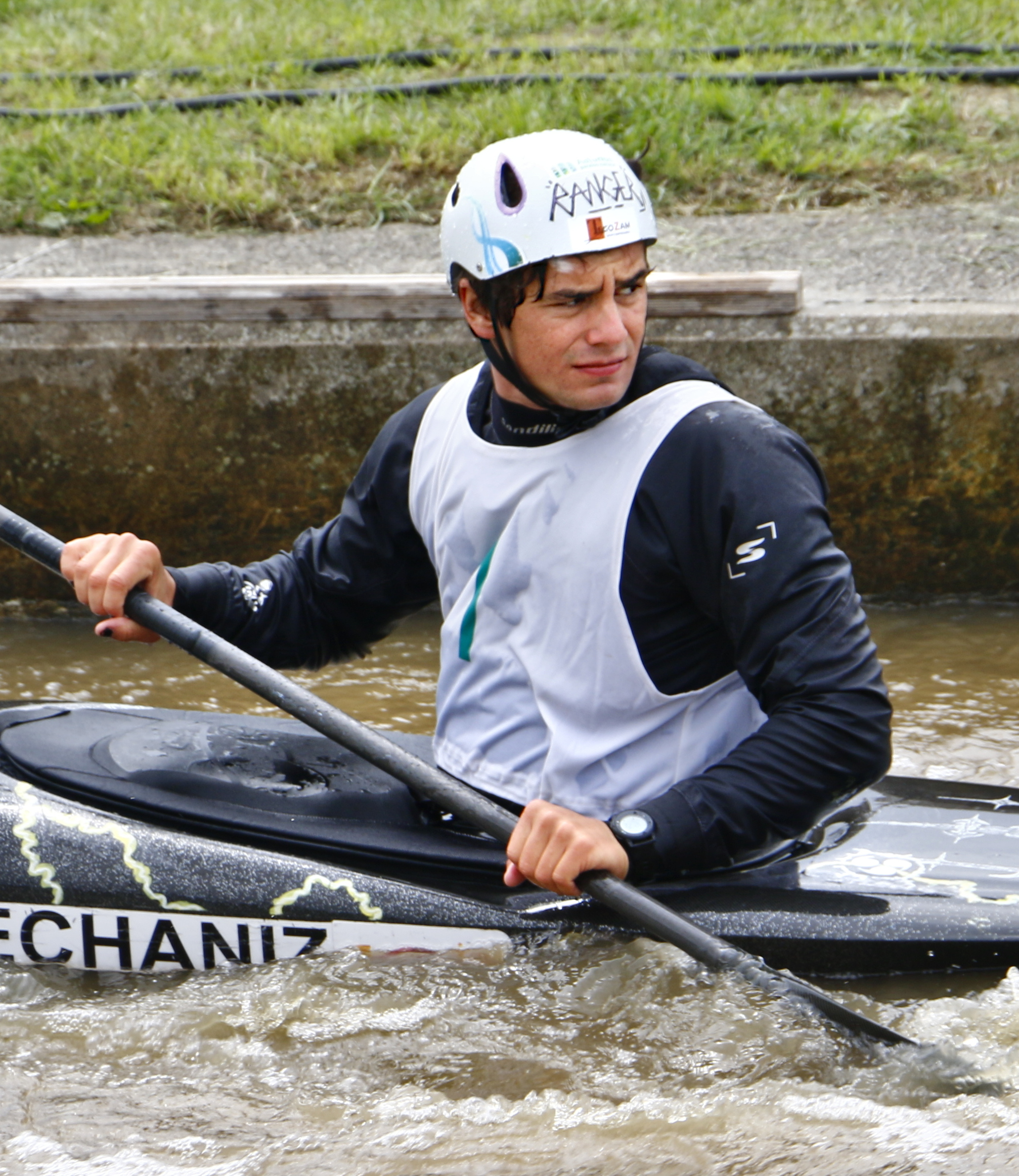
- Echaniz at the 2024 World Championship

Personal information
- Born: 29 May 2001 (age 25) San Sebastián, Spain

Sport
- Sport: Canoe slalom
- Event(s): K1, Kayak cross, C1, Mixed C2
Medal record
Representing Spain
Olympic Games
| Bronze medal – third place | 2024 Paris | K1 |
European Games
| Gold medal – first place | 2023 Kraków | K1 team |
European Championships
| Bronze medal – third place | 2025 Vaires-sur-Marne | K1 team |
U23 World Championships
| Silver medal – second place | 2022 Ivrea | K1 team |
| Silver medal – second place | 2023 Kraków | K1 team |
U23 European Championships
| Gold medal – first place | 2022 České Budějovice | Kayak cross |
| Gold medal – first place | 2023 Bratislava | K1 team |
| Silver medal – second place | 2022 České Budějovice | K1 team |
| Bronze medal – third place | 2021 Solkan | K1 team |
Junior World Championships
| Silver medal – second place | 2017 Bratislava | C1 team |
| Silver medal – second place | 2017 Bratislava | K1 team |
| Bronze medal – third place | 2018 Ivrea | Kayak cross |
| Bronze medal – third place | 2018 Ivrea | Mixed C2 |
Junior European Championships
| Silver medal – second place | 2017 Hohenlimburg | C1 team |
| Silver medal – second place | 2019 Liptovský Mikuláš | K1 |
| Bronze medal – third place | 2019 Liptovský Mikuláš | K1 team |

Pau Echaniz Pal (born 29 May 2001) is a Spanish slalom canoeist who has competed at the international level since 2017. He won a bronze medal in the K1 event at the 2024 Summer Olympics in Paris.

He won one gold and one bronze medal in the K1 team event at the European Championships, with the gold coming at the 2023 European Games in Kraków, together with David Llorente and Miquel Travé.

== World Cup individual podiums ==
| Season | Date | Venue | Position | Event |
|---|---|---|---|---|
| 2025 | 15 June 2025 | Pau | 1st | Kayak cross |
