= Martin Dougoud =

Swiss kayaker (born 1991)

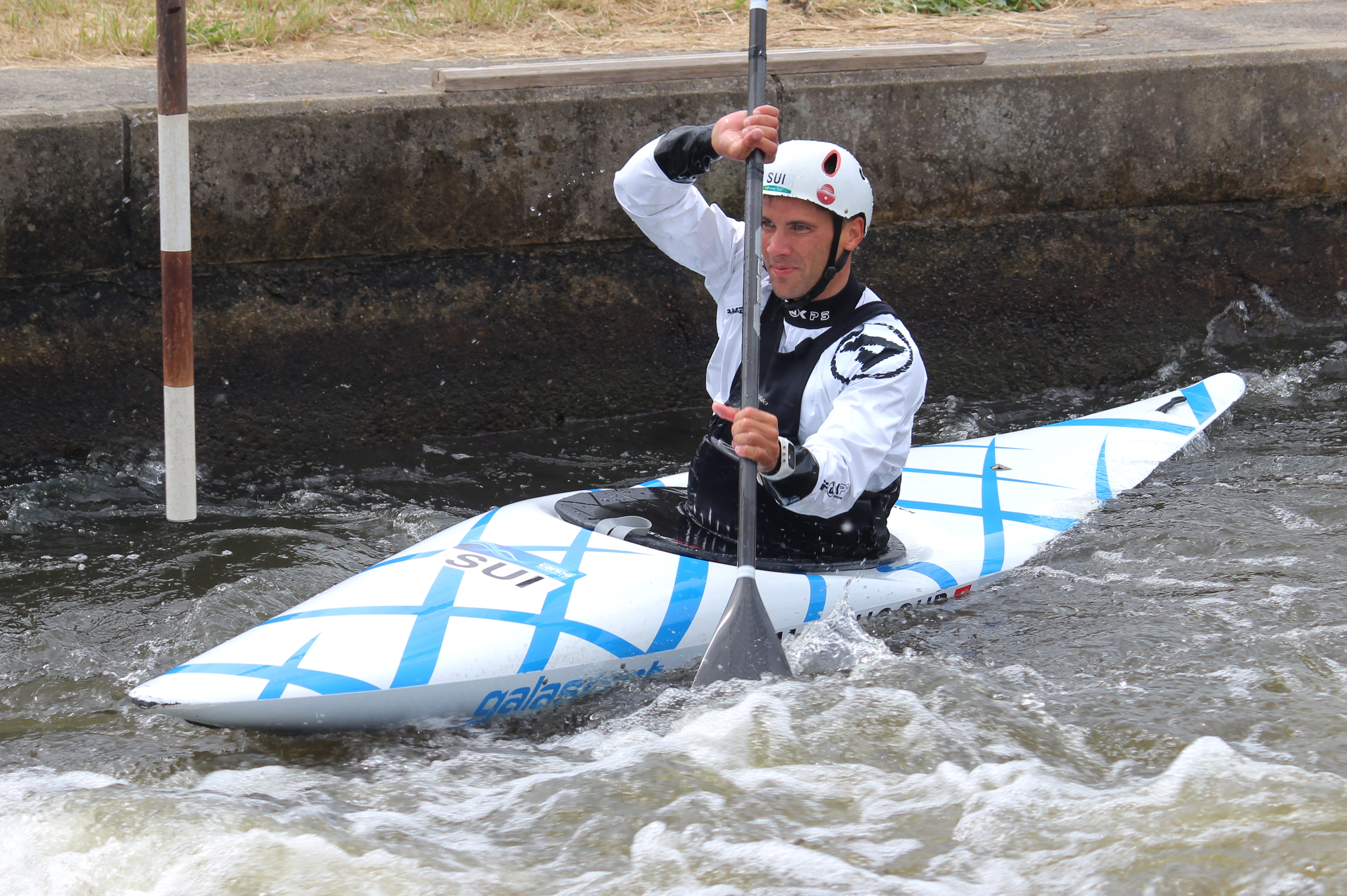
- Martin Dougoud in 2023

Personal information
- Nationality: Swiss
- Born: 19 May 1991 (age 35)

Sport
- Country: Switzerland
- Sport: Canoe slalom
- Event: K1, Kayak cross
- Club: Canoë Club Genève
Medal record
Men's canoe slalom
Representing Switzerland
World Championships
Silver medal – second place	2026 Oklahoma City	K1 team
Bronze medal – third place	2023 London	Kayak cross
European Games
Silver medal – second place	2023 Kraków	K1
European Championships
Bronze medal – third place	2020 Prague	K1 team
Bronze medal – third place	2024 Tacen	Kayak cross individual

Martin Dougoud (born 19 May 1991) is a Swiss slalom canoeist who has competed at the international level since 2008. He is from Geneva, Switzerland but lives and trains in Pau, France. Martin competes in the K1 and kayak cross disciplines.

He won two medals at the ICF Canoe Slalom World Championships with a silver (K1 team: 2026) and a bronze (kayak cross: 2023).

He also won three medals (1 silver and 2 bronzes) at the European Championships, including a silver medal in the K1 event at the 2023 European Games in Kraków.

Dougoud finished 19th at the 2019 ICF Canoe Slalom World Championships securing a quota place for Switzerland in the K1 event at the delayed 2020 Summer Olympics in Tokyo. The Swiss Olympic Selection Committee approved his nomination for the position on 11 November 2019. He finished 13th in the K1 event after being eliminated in the semifinal. He also competed at the 2024 Summer Olympics in Paris, finishing 4th in the K1 event and 5th in kayak cross.

== World Cup individual podiums ==
Season	Date	Venue	Position	Event
2020	7 November 2020	Pau	1st	K1
2022	11 June 2022	Prague	3rd	K1
2022	27 August 2022	Pau	2nd	K1
2023	4 June 2023	Augsburg	2nd	Kayak cross
2024	16 June 2024	Kraków	1st	Kayak cross
