= Dariusz Popiela =

Polish canoeist (born 1985)

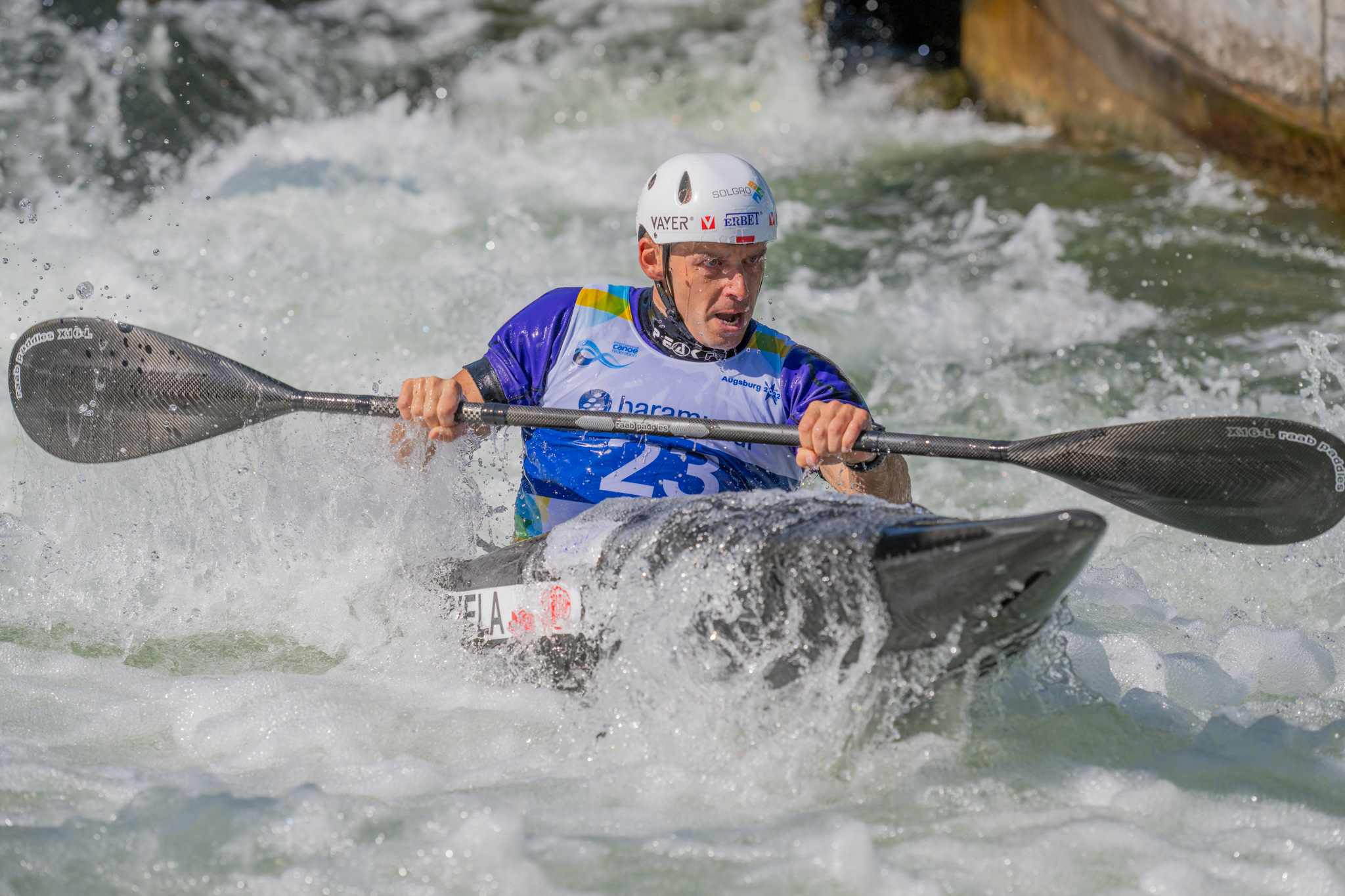
- Popiela in 2022

Personal information
- Full name: Dariusz Bogusław Popiela
- Nationality: Polish
- Born: 27 July 1985 (age 40) Kraków, Poland
- Height: 1.70 m (5 ft 7 in)
- Weight: 67 kg (148 lb)

Sport
- Country: Poland
- Sport: Canoe slalom
- Event: K1
- Club: KS Spojnia Warszawa
Medal record
Men's canoe slalom
Representing Poland
World Championships
Silver medal – second place	2013 Prague	K1 team
Silver medal – second place	2018 Rio de Janeiro	K1 team
Bronze medal – third place	2006 Prague	K1 team
Bronze medal – third place	2019 La Seu d'Urgell	K1 team
Bronze medal – third place	2023 London	K1 team
European Games
Silver medal – second place	2023 Kraków	K1 team
European Championships
Gold medal – first place	2008 Kraków	K1 team
Gold medal – first place	2010 Bratislava	K1 team
Silver medal – second place	2006 L'Argentière-la-Bessée	K1 team
Silver medal – second place	2011 La Seu d'Urgell	K1 team
Silver medal – second place	2017 Tacen	K1
Silver medal – second place	2018 Prague	K1 team
Silver medal – second place	2019 Pau	K1
Silver medal – second place	2022 Liptovský Mikuláš	K1 team
Bronze medal – third place	2013 Kraków	K1 team
Bronze medal – third place	2014 Vienna	K1 team
Bronze medal – third place	2017 Tacen	K1 team
U23 European Championships
Gold medal – first place	2005 Kraków	K1 team
Gold medal – first place	2006 Nottingham	K1 team
Gold medal – first place	2007 Kraków	K1
Gold medal – first place	2007 Kraków	K1 team
Silver medal – second place	2006 Nottingham	K1

Dariusz Bogusław "Darek" Popiela (born 27 July 1985) is a Polish slalom canoeist who has competed at the international level since 1999. He represented Austria until 2002.

== Career ==
Popiela won five medals in the K1 team event at the ICF Canoe Slalom World Championships with two silvers (2013, 2018) and three bronzes (2006, 2019, 2023). He also won two golds, seven silvers and three bronzes at the European Championships, including a silver in the K1 team event at the 2023 European Games in Kraków.

Popiela finished 8th in the K1 event at the 2008 Summer Olympics in Beijing.

His father Bogusław and his uncle Henryk both represented Poland in canoe slalom.

Aside from sports, Popiela is also involved in leading projects dedicated to restoring Jewish heritage sites in the Nowy Sącz region. In 2019, Popiela and his team of volunteers installed a memorial at the Jewish cemetery in Grybów.

== World Cup individual podiums ==
Season	Date	Venue	Position	Event
2011	9 July 2011	Markkleeberg	3rd	K1
2016	4 June 2016	Ivrea	3rd	K1
2018	24 June 2018	Liptovský Mikuláš	2nd	K1
