= Mateusz Polaczyk =

Polish canoeist (born 1988)

Personal information
- Nationality: Polish
- Born: 22 January 1988 (age 38) Limanowa, Poland
- Height: 1.78 m (5 ft 10 in)
- Weight: 75 kg (165 lb)

Sport
- Country: Poland
- Sport: Canoe slalom
- Event: K1
- Club: Zawisza Bydgoszcz
Medal record
Men's canoe slalom
Representing Poland
World Championships
Silver medal – second place	2011 Bratislava	K1
Silver medal – second place	2013 Prague	K1 team
Silver medal – second place	2015 London	K1
Silver medal – second place	2018 Rio de Janeiro	K1 team
Bronze medal – third place	2006 Prague	K1 team
Bronze medal – third place	2013 Prague	K1
Bronze medal – third place	2023 London	K1 team
European Games
Silver medal – second place	2023 Kraków	K1 team
European Championships
Gold medal – first place	2008 Kraków	K1 team
Gold medal – first place	2010 Bratislava	K1 team
Gold medal – first place	2017 Tacen	K1
Silver medal – second place	2011 La Seu d'Urgell	K1 team
Silver medal – second place	2018 Prague	K1 team
Bronze medal – third place	2014 Vienna	K1 team
Bronze medal – third place	2017 Tacen	K1 team
Bronze medal – third place	2020 Prague	K1
U23 European Championships
Gold medal – first place	2007 Kraków	K1 team
Gold medal – first place	2011 Banja Luka	K1
Silver medal – second place	2010 Markkleeberg	K1 team
Bronze medal – third place	2008 Solkan	K1 team
Junior World Championships
Gold medal – first place	2006 Solkan	K1
Junior European Championships
Gold medal – first place	2006 Nottingham	K1 team
Silver medal – second place	2005 Kraków	K1
Bronze medal – third place	2006 Nottingham	K1

Mateusz Polaczyk (born 22 January 1988) is a Polish slalom canoeist who has competed at the international level since 2004, specializing in K1 and kayak cross.

== Career ==
Polaczyk finished 4th in the K1 event at the 2012 Summer Olympics in London. He also competed at the 2024 Summer Olympics in Paris, finishing 13th in the K1 event and 8th in kayak cross.

He won seven medals at the ICF Canoe Slalom World Championships with four silvers (K1: 2011, 2015; K1 team: 2013, 2018) and three bronzes (K1: 2013, K1 team: 2006, 2023).

He also won three golds, three silvers and three bronzes at the European Championships, including a silver in the K1 team event at the 2023 European Games in Kraków.

== Personal life ==
He has four brothers (Grzegorz, Rafał, Henryk and Łukasz) and two sisters (Joanna Mędoń and Iwona) all of whom have competed in canoe slalom.

== World Cup individual podiums ==
Season	Date	Venue	Position	Event
2012	25 August 2012	Prague	2nd	K1
2013	24 August 2013	Bratislava	3rd	K1
2014	7 June 2014	Lee Valley	3rd	K1
2024	7 June 2024	Prague	2nd	K1
2024	14 September 2024	Ivrea	1st	K1
2025	29 August 2025	Tacen	3rd	K1
