= Gabriel De Coster =

Belgian canoeist (born 1996)

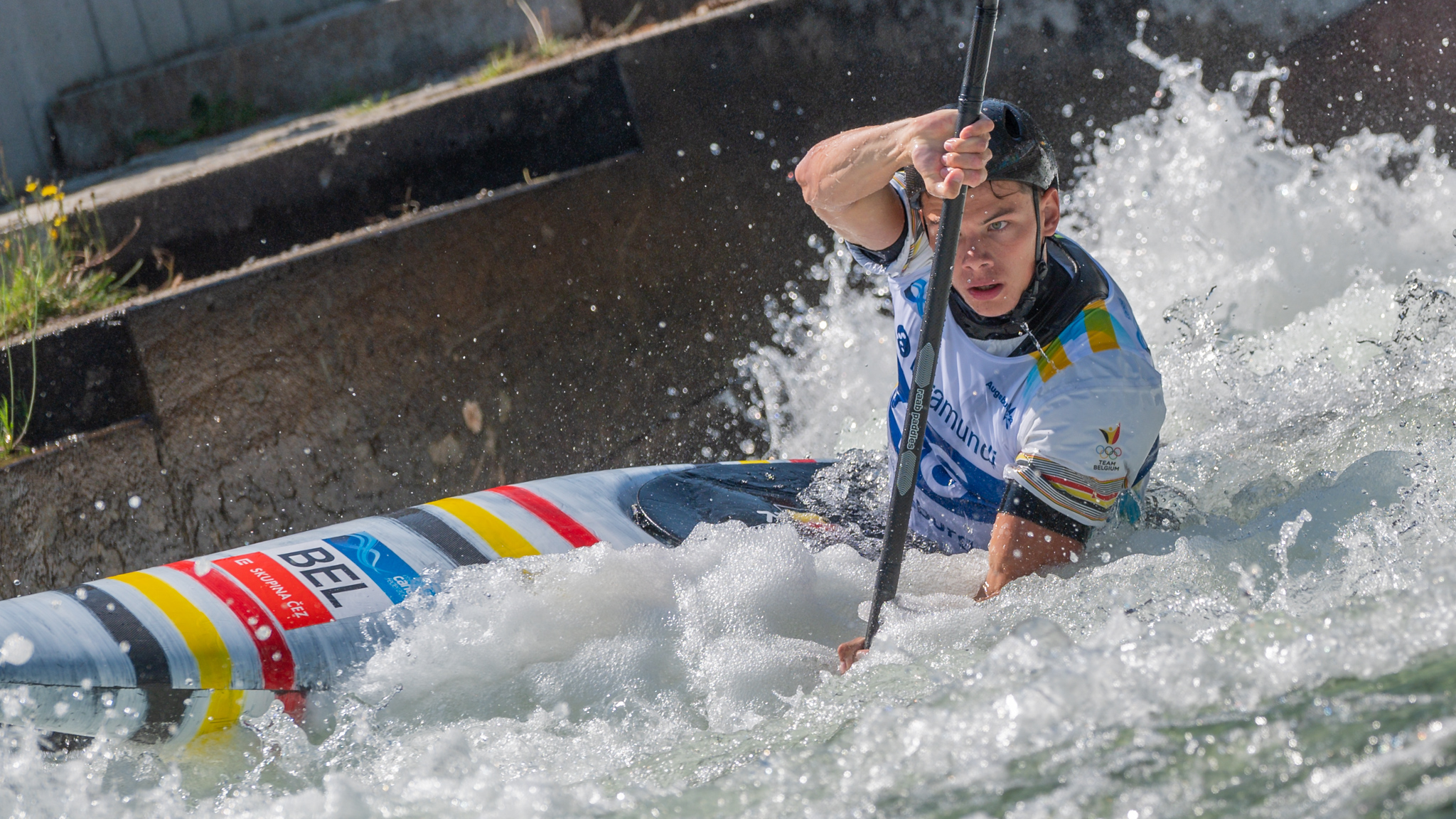
- Gabriel De Coster performing at 2022 ICF Canoe Slalom World Championships in Augsburg, Germany

Personal information
- Nationality: Belgian
- Born: 25 October 2000 (age 26) Uccle, Belgium

Sport
- Country: Belgium
- Sport: Canoe slalom
- Event: K1, Kayak cross
- Club: Koninklijke Cano Club Mechelen
- Coached by: Roberto di Angelo
Medal record
Men's canoe slalom
Representing Belgium
European Championships
| Gold medal – first place | 2025 Vaires-sur-Marne | Kayak cross individual |
U23 European Championships
| Bronze medal – third place | 2020 Kraków | K1 |

Gabriel De Coster (born 25 October 2000 in Uccle) is a Belgian slalom canoeist who has competed at the international level since 2017.

== Career ==
De Coster won the gold medal in kayak cross individual at the 2025 European Championships in Vaires-sur-Marne.

In October 2020 he was a surprise bronze medalist in the K1 event at the U23 European Championships.

On 6 May 2021, De Coster progressed to the semifinal of the 2021 European Championships, qualifying to represent Belgium in the K1 event at the delayed 2020 Summer Olympics in Tokyo. He finished 22nd after being eliminated in the heats.

De Coster delivered a breakthrough performance at the Pau round of the 2022 Canoe Slalom World Cup, winning the K1 event in a time of 97.94 seconds. This was Gabriel's first final at the senior level and marked Belgium's first World Cup victory.

== Results ==
=== World Cup individual podiums ===
| Season | Date | Venue | Position | Event |
|---|---|---|---|---|
| 2022 | 27 August 2022 | Pau | 1st | K1 |
| 2025 | 29 June 2025 | Prague | 1st | Kayak cross individual |
| 2026 | 14 June 2026 | Augsburg | 3rd | Kayak cross |
| 2026 | 5 September 2026 | Vaires-sur-Marne | 3rd | Kayak cross individual |

=== Complete World Cup results ===
| Year | WC1 | WC2 | WC3 | WC4 | WC5 | Points | Position |
|---|---|---|---|---|---|---|---|
| 2019 | Lee Valley (United Kingdom) | Bratislava (Slovakia) | Tacen (Slovenia) | Markkleeberg (Germany); 36 | Prague (Czech Republic); 47 | 13 | 70th |
| 2021 | Prague (Czech Republic); 59 | Markkleeberg (Germany); 54 | La Seu (Spain) | Pau (France) | | 4 | 87th |
| 2022 | Prague (Czech Republic); 28 | Kraków (Poland) | Tacen (Slovenia) | Pau (France); 1 | La Seu (Spain) | 77 | |

=== Complete Championship Results ===
| Year | Level | Venue | Event | Result |
|---|---|---|---|---|
| 2017 | Junior European | (Germany) Hohenlimburg | K1 | 18th |
| 2017 | Junior World | (Slovakia) Bratislava | K1 | 65th |
| 2018 | Junior European | (Slovakia) Bratislava | K1 team | 8th |
| 2018 | Junior European | (Slovakia) Bratislava | K1 | 27th |
| 2018 | Junior World | (Italy) Ivrea | K1 team | 15th |
| 2018 | Junior World | (Italy) Ivrea | K1 | 14th |
| 2018 | European | (Czech Republic) Prague | K1 | 41st |
| 2019 | U23 European | (Slovakia) Liptovský Mikuláš | K1 team | 9th |
| 2019 | U23 European | (Slovakia) Liptovský Mikuláš | K1 | 36th |
| 2019 | U23 World | (Poland) Kraków | K1 | 32nd |
| 2019 | U23 World | (Poland) Kraków | Extreme | 18th |
| 2019 | European | (France) Pau | K1 team | 15th |
| 2019 | European | (France) Pau | K1 | 40th |
| 2019 | World | (Spain) La Seu | K1 team | 25th |
| 2019 | World | (Spain) La Seu | K1 | 49th |
| 2020 | U23 European | (Poland) Kraków | K1 | 3rd |
| 2020 | European | (Czech Republic) Prague | K1 | 19th |
| 2021 | U23 European | (Slovenia) Solkan | K1 team | 11th |
| 2021 | U23 European | (Slovenia) Solkan | K1 | 27th |
| 2021 | European | (Italy) Ivrea | K1 team | 16th |
| 2021 | European | (Italy) Ivrea | K1 | 30th |
| 2021 | Olympic | (Japan) Tokyo | K1 | 22nd |
| 2021 | World | (Slovakia) Bratislava | K1 | 29th |
| 2022 | U23 European | (Czech Republic) České Budějovice | K1 team | 6th |
| 2022 | U23 European | (Czech Republic) České Budějovice | K1 | 10th |
| 2022 | U23 European | (Czech Republic) České Budějovice | Extreme | 12th |
| 2022 | U23 World | (Italy) Ivrea | K1 team | 4th |
| 2022 | U23 World | (Italy) Ivrea | K1 | 13th |
| 2022 | U23 World | (Italy) Ivrea | Extreme | 25th |
| 2022 | European | (Slovakia) Liptovský Mikuláš | K1 | 31st |
| 2022 | European | (Slovakia) Liptovský Mikuláš | Extreme | 41st |
| 2022 | World | (Germany) Augsburg | K1 team | 17th |
| 2022 | World | (Germany) Augsburg | K1 | 100th |
| 2022 | World | (Germany) Augsburg | Extreme | 23rd |
