= Stefan Hengst =

German slalom canoeist

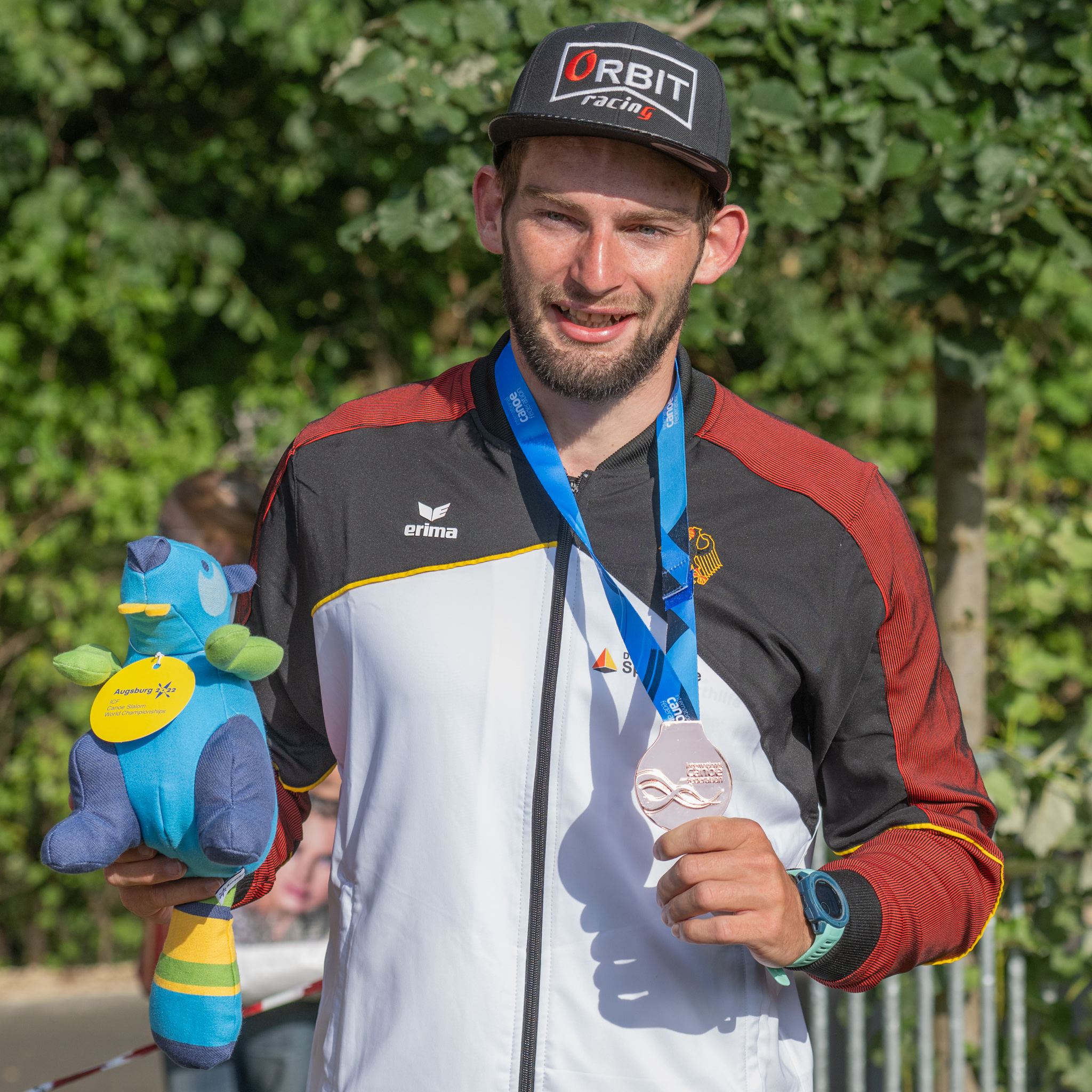

Personal information
- Nationality: German
- Born: 17 March 1994 (age 32) Hamm, Germany
- Height: 1.84 m (6 ft 0 in)
- Weight: 74 kg (163 lb)

Sport
- Country: Germany
- Sport: Canoe slalom
- Event: K1, Kayak cross
- Club: Kanu Ring Hamm e.V.
Medal record
Men's canoe slalom
Representing Germany
World Championships
Gold medal – first place	2019 Prague	Kayak cross
Gold medal – first place	2022 Augsburg	K1 team
Bronze medal – third place	2022 Augsburg	Kayak cross
European Championships
Gold medal – first place	2025 Vaires-sur-Marne	K1 team
Silver medal – second place	2021 Ivrea	K1 team
Bronze medal – third place	2019 Pau	K1 team
Bronze medal – third place	2022 Liptovský Mikuláš	K1 team
U23 World Championships
Gold medal – first place	2013 Liptovský Mikuláš	K1 team
Gold medal – first place	2016 Kraków	K1 team
Gold medal – first place	2017 Bratislava	K1 team
U23 European Championships
Silver medal – second place	2015 Kraków	K1 team
Bronze medal – third place	2016 Solkan	K1
Junior World Championships
Bronze medal – third place	2012 Wausau	K1 team
Junior European Championships
Gold medal – first place	2012 Solkan	K1
Silver medal – second place	2012 Solkan	K1 team
Bronze medal – third place	2011 Banja Luka	K1 team

Stefan Hengst (born 17 March 1994) is a German slalom canoeist who has competed at the international level since 2011, specializing in K1 and kayak cross.

He won three medals at the ICF Canoe Slalom World Championships with two golds (Kayak cross: 2019, K1 team: 2022) and a bronze (Kayak cross: 2022).

He also won four medals (1 gold, 1 silver and 2 bronzes) in the K1 team event at the European Championships.

Hengst competed at the 2024 Summer Olympics in Paris, finishing 30th in kayak cross.

== World Cup individual podiums ==
Season	Date	Venue	Position	Event
2018	8 July 2018	Augsburg	3rd	Kayak cross
2019	8 September 2019	Prague	1st	Kayak cross^{1}
2021	20 June 2021	Markkleeberg	3rd	Kayak cross
2022	12 June 2022	Prague	1st	Kayak cross
2023	18 June 2023	Tacen	3rd	Kayak cross

^{1} World Championship counting for World Cup points
