= David Llorente =

Spanish canoeist

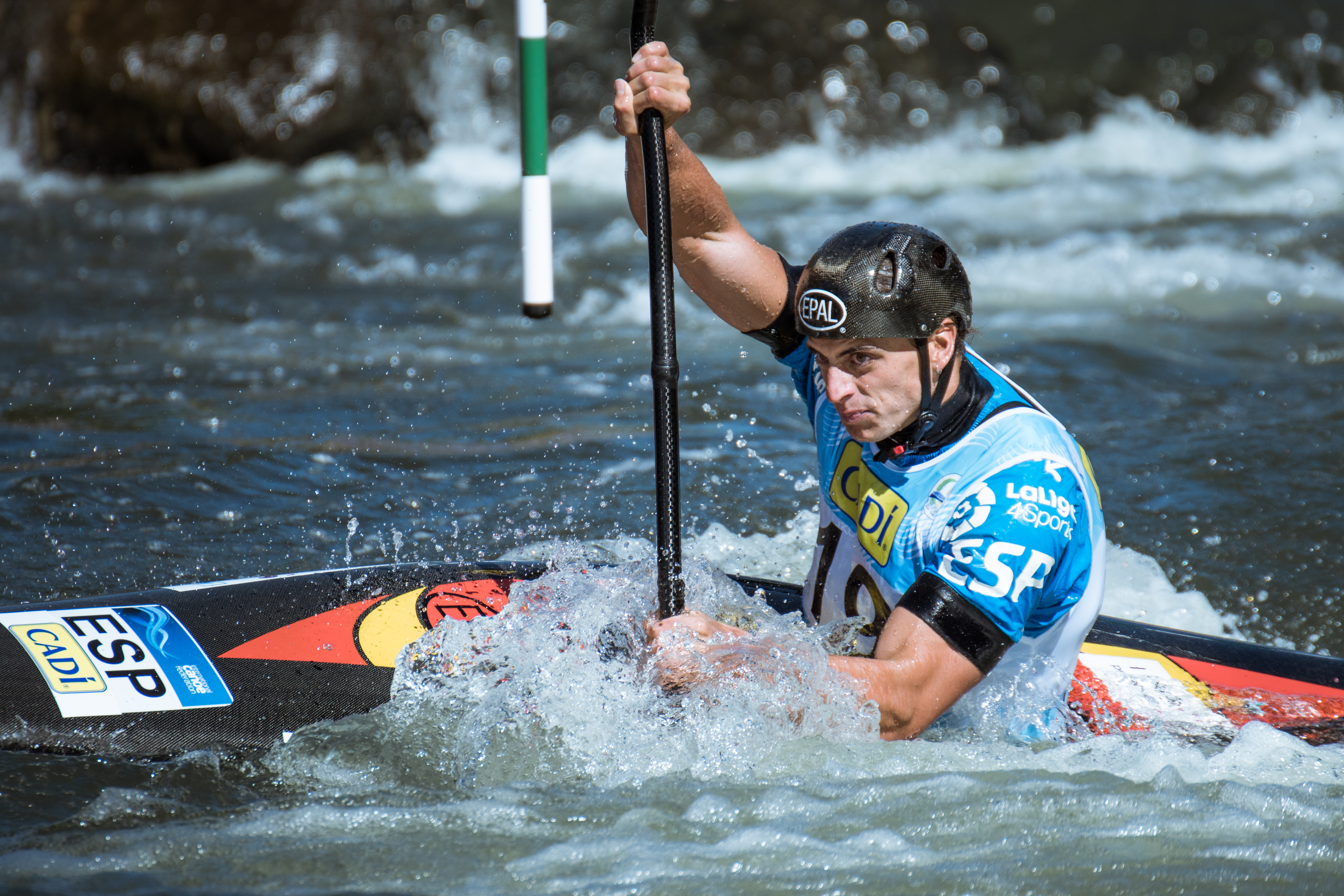

Personal information
- Nationality: Spanish
- Born: 16 December 1996 (age 29) Palazuelos de Eresma, Spain

Sport
- Country: Spain
- Sport: Canoe slalom
- Events: K1, Kayak cross, Mixed C2
- Club: Río Eresma
Medal record
Men's canoe slalom
Representing Spain
World Championships
Gold medal – first place	2019 La Seu d'Urgell	K1 team
Gold medal – first place	2025 Penrith	Kayak cross individual
Silver medal – second place	2019 La Seu d'Urgell	K1
Bronze medal – third place	2026 Oklahoma City	Kayak cross individual
European Games
Gold medal – first place	2023 Kraków	K1 team
European Championships
Bronze medal – third place	2024 Tacen	Kayak cross
Bronze medal – third place	2025 Vaires-sur-Marne	K1 team
U23 World Championships
Gold medal – first place	2018 Ivrea	Mixed C2
Silver medal – second place	2015 Foz do Iguaçu	K1
Bronze medal – third place	2019 Kraków	K1 team
U23 European Championships
Gold medal – first place	2018 Bratislava	K1
Bronze medal – third place	2015 Kraków	K1
Junior World Championships
Silver medal – second place	2014 Penrith	K1 team
Junior European Championships
Silver medal – second place	2014 Skopje	K1 team

David Llorente (born 16 December 1996) is a Spanish slalom canoeist who has competed at the international level since 2014.

He won four medals at the ICF Canoe Slalom World Championships with two golds (Kayak cross individual: 2025, K1 team: 2019) a silver (K1: 2019) and a bronze (Kayak cross individual: 2026). Llorente became the first world champion in kayak cross individual in 2025 in Penrith.

He also won one gold and two bronze medals at the European Championships, with the gold medal coming in the K1 team event at the 2023 European Games in Kraków.

Llorente qualified to represent Spain in the K1 event at the delayed 2020 Summer Olympics in Tokyo, where he finished 10th.

== World Cup individual podiums ==
Season	Date	Venue	Position	Event
2024	22 September 2024	La Seu d'Urgell	2nd	Kayak cross
2025	7 September 2025	Augsburg	3rd	Kayak cross individual
2026	14 June 2026	Augsburg	2nd	Kayak cross
