= Erik Holmer =

Swedish kayaker (born 1995)

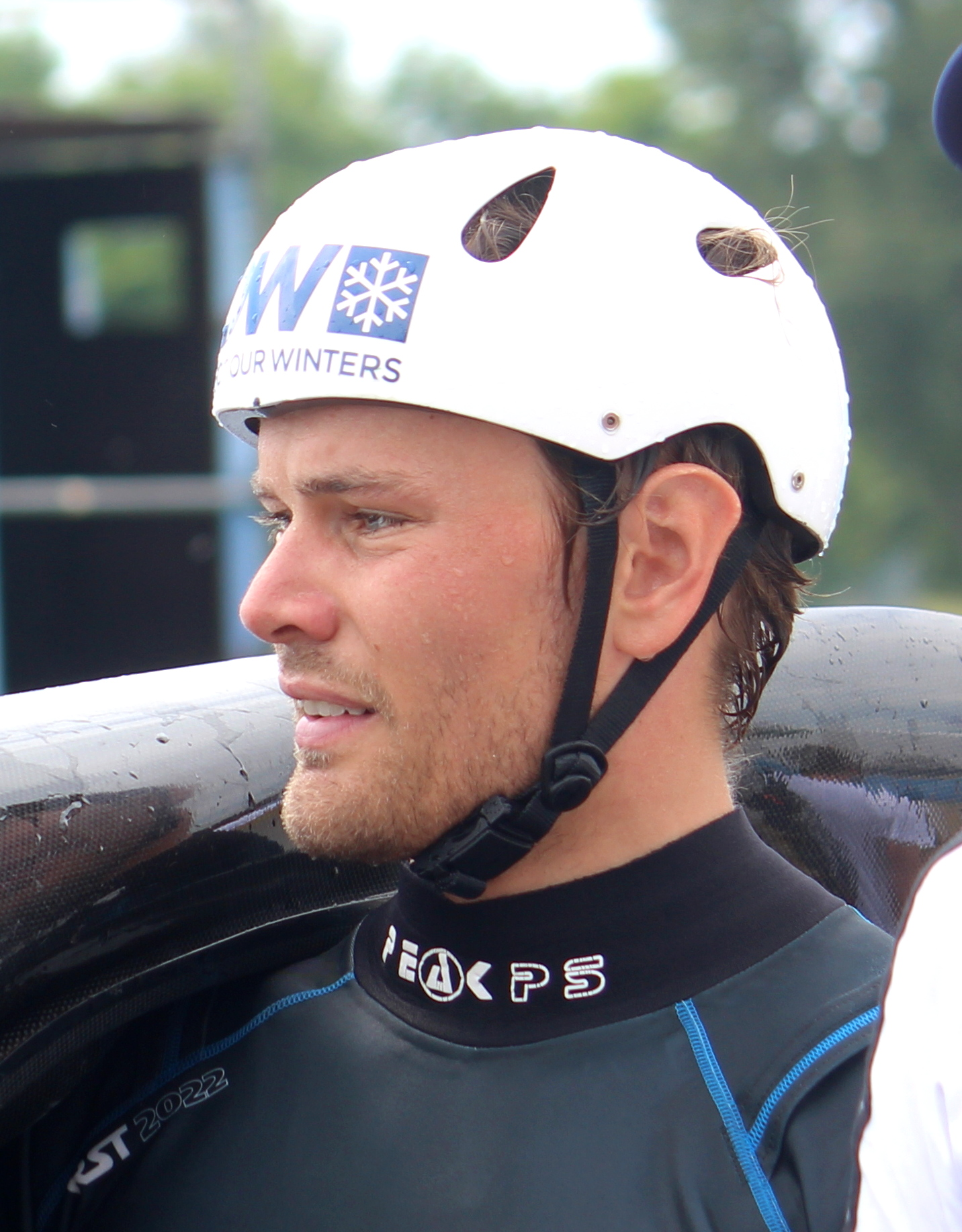
- Erik Holmer performing at 2022 ICF Canoe Slalom World Championships in Augsburg, Germany

Personal information
- Nationality: Swedish
- Born: 5 April 1995 (age 31)

Sport
- Country: Sweden
- Sport: Canoe slalom
- Event: K1
- Club: Nyköpings forspaddlare
- Coached by: Martin Potocny, Didier Baylac & Marcus Göthberg
Medal record
Men's canoe slalom
Representing Sweden
U23 World Championships
Bronze medal – third place	2018 Ivrea	K1

Erik Holmer (born 5 April 1995) is a Swedish slalom canoeist who has competed at the international level since 2010. He is from Nyköping, Sweden and has resided in both Prague and Pau, France.

Holmer won a bronze medal in the K1 event at the 2018 U23 World Championships in Ivrea, Italy. He earned his best senior world championship result, of 31st, at the 2017 World Championships in Pau. He also finished 4th in the K1 team event at the same championships.

Holmer represented Sweden in the K1 Event at the 2020 Summer Olympics in Tokyo following a strong performance in the opening two rounds of the 2021 World Cup. He qualified 10th fastest for the final, where he finished 9th after receiving a 50-second penalty.
