= List of ICF Canoe Slalom World Championships medalists in women's canoe =

This is a list of medalists from the ICF Canoe Slalom World Championships in women's canoe.

== C1 ==
Debuted: 2009 as an exhibition event, 2010 as a medal event.

Championships	Gold	Silver	Bronze
2009 La Seu d'Urgell (exhibition event)	Leanne Guinea (AUS)	Rosalyn Lawrence (AUS)	Jessica Fox (AUS)
2010 Tacen	Jana Dukátová (SVK)	Leanne Guinea (AUS)	Jessica Fox (AUS)
2011 Bratislava	Kateřina Hošková (CZE)	Cen Nanqin (CHN)	Katarína Macová (SVK)
2013 Prague	Jessica Fox (AUS)	Mallory Franklin (GBR)	Caroline Loir (FRA)
2014 Deep Creek Lake	Jessica Fox (AUS)	Mallory Franklin (GBR)	Oriane Rebours (FRA)
2015 London	Jessica Fox (AUS)	Kateřina Hošková (CZE)	Núria Vilarrubla (ESP)
2017 Pau	Mallory Franklin (GBR)	Tereza Fišerová (CZE)	Ana Sátila (BRA)
2018 Rio de Janeiro	Jessica Fox (AUS)	Mallory Franklin (GBR)	Tereza Fišerová (CZE)
2019 La Seu d'Urgell	Andrea Herzog (GER)	Jessica Fox (AUS)	Nadine Weratschnig (AUT)
2021 Bratislava	Elena Apel (GER)	Mallory Franklin (GBR)	Gabriela Satková (CZE)
2022 Augsburg	Andrea Herzog (GER)	Jessica Fox (AUS)	Mallory Franklin (GBR)
2023 London	Mallory Franklin (GBR)	Kimberley Woods (GBR)	Jessica Fox (AUS)
2025 Penrith	Klaudia Zwolińska (POL)	Alsu Minazova (AIN)	Ana Sátila (BRA)
2026 Oklahoma City	Tereza Kneblová (CZE)	Mònica Dòria (AND)	Klaudia Zwolińska (POL)

- Medal table

Rank	Nation	Gold	Silver	Bronze	Total
1	Australia (AUS)	4	3	2	9
2	Germany (GER)	3	0	0	3
3	Great Britain (GBR)	2	5	1	8
4	Czech Republic (CZE)	2	2	2	6
5	Poland (POL)	1	0	1	2
5	Slovakia (SVK)	1	0	1	2
7	Andorra (AND)	0	1	0	1
7	China (CHN)	0	1	0	1
7	Individual Neutral Athletes (AIN)	0	1	0	1
10	Brazil (BRA)	0	0	2	2
10	France (FRA)	0	0	2	2
12	Austria (AUT)	0	0	1	1
12	Spain (ESP)	0	0	1	1
Totals (13 entries)		13	13	13	39

== C1 team ==
Debuted: 2011. Not counted as a medal event due to insufficient number of participating countries in 2011 and 2014.

Championships	Gold	Silver	Bronze
2011 Bratislava (non-medal event)	Australia; Jessica Fox; Rosalyn Lawrence; Leanne Guinea	China; Teng Qianqian; Cen Nanqin; Xu Yanru	Germany; Mira Louen; Michaela Grimm; Lena Stöcklin
2013 Prague	Australia; Jessica Fox; Rosalyn Lawrence; Alison Borrows	Czech Republic; Kateřina Hošková; Monika Jančová; Anna Koblencová	Germany; Mira Louen; Lena Stöcklin; Karolin Wagner
2014 Deep Creek Lake (non-medal event)	Czech Republic; Kateřina Hošková; Monika Jančová; Martina Satková	Great Britain; Mallory Franklin; Jasmine Royle; Eilidh Gibson	France; Caroline Loir; Oriane Rebours; Lucie Baudu
2015 London	Australia; Jessica Fox; Rosalyn Lawrence; Alison Borrows	Czech Republic; Kateřina Hošková; Monika Jančová; Tereza Fišerová	Austria; Julia Schmid; Viktoria Wolffhardt; Nadine Weratschnig
2017 Pau	Great Britain; Mallory Franklin; Kimberley Woods; Eilidh Gibson	Australia; Jessica Fox; Noemie Fox; Rosalyn Lawrence	Czech Republic; Tereza Fišerová; Monika Jančová; Eva Říhová
2018 Rio de Janeiro	Great Britain; Mallory Franklin; Kimberley Woods; Bethan Forrow	Czech Republic; Tereza Fišerová; Kateřina Havlíčková; Gabriela Satková	France; Lucie Prioux; Lucie Baudu; Claire Jacquet
2019 La Seu d'Urgell	Australia; Jessica Fox; Noemie Fox; Rosalyn Lawrence	Spain; Núria Vilarrubla; Klara Olazabal; Ainhoa Lameiro	Czech Republic; Tereza Fišerová; Eva Říhová; Kateřina Havlíčková
2021 Bratislava	Czech Republic; Tereza Fišerová; Gabriela Satková; Martina Satková	Spain; Núria Vilarrubla; Klara Olazabal; Miren Lazkano	RCF; Alsu Minazova; Polina Mukhgaleeva; Zulfiia Sabitova
2022 Augsburg	Czech Republic; Gabriela Satková; Tereza Fišerová; Martina Satková	Germany; Elena Lilik; Andrea Herzog; Nele Bayn	Great Britain; Mallory Franklin; Kimberley Woods; Sophie Ogilvie
2023 London	Great Britain; Mallory Franklin; Kimberley Woods; Ellis Miller	Czech Republic; Gabriela Satková; Tereza Fišerová; Tereza Kneblová	Slovenia; Eva Alina Hočevar; Alja Kozorog; Lea Novak
2025 Penrith	Czech Republic; Gabriela Satková; Martina Satková; Adriana Morenová	Germany; Andrea Herzog; Elena Lilik; Nele Bayn	Great Britain; Ellis Miller; Kimberley Woods; Bethan Forrow
2026 Oklahoma City	Slovakia; Zuzana Paňková; Soňa Stanovská; Emanuela Luknárová	Czech Republic; Tereza Kneblová; Martina Satková; Adriana Morenová	France; Angèle Hug; Doriane Delassus; Marjorie Delassus

- Medal table

Rank	Nation	Gold	Silver	Bronze	Total
1	Czech Republic (CZE)	3	5	2	10
2	Australia (AUS)	3	1	0	4
3	Great Britain (GBR)	3	0	2	5
4	Slovakia (SVK)	1	0	0	1
5	Germany (GER)	0	2	1	3
6	Spain (ESP)	0	2	0	2
7	France (FRA)	0	0	2	2
8	Austria (AUT)	0	0	1	1
8	RCF	0	0	1	1
8	Slovenia (SLO)	0	0	1	1
Totals (10 entries)		10	10	10	30
