= 2025 ICF Canoe Slalom World Championships – Women's C1 team =

Women's canoe teams at the 2025 ICF Canoe Slalom World Championships
- Venue: Penrith Whitewater Stadium
- Location: Penrith, Australia
- Dates: 30 September 2025
- Competitors: 27 from 9 nations
- Teams: 9

Medalists
| gold medal | Gabriela Satková; Martina Satková; Adriana Morenová | Czech Republic |
| silver medal | Andrea Herzog; Elena Lilik; Nele Bayn | Germany |
| bronze medal | Ellis Miller; Kimberley Woods; Bethan Forrow | Great Britain |

The women's canoe team event at the 2025 ICF Canoe Slalom World Championships took place on 30 September 2025 at Penrith Whitewater Stadium in Penrith.

== Competition format ==
Team events use a single run format with the team with the fastest time including penalties awarded gold. Teams consist of three paddlers from the same country.

Penalties are accumulated for each athlete, such that a team can incur a total of 150 seconds of penalties on a single gate (if all three miss it) or 6 seconds (if all three touch it). The time begins when the first paddler crosses the start beam and ends when the last one crosses the finish beam. All three paddlers must cross the finish line within 15 seconds of each other or else incur an additional 50-second penalty.

The teams had to navigate a total of 20 gates along the course, including 6 upstream gates (2-7-10-11-15-20).

== Results ==
| Rank | Bib | Country | Athletes | Result | | |
| Rank | Bib | Country | Athletes | Time | Pen | Total |
|---|---|---|---|---|---|---|
| 1st place, gold medalist(s) | 2 | Czech Republic | Gabriela Satková; Martina Satková; Adriana Morenová | 109.57 | 0 | 109.57 |
| 2nd place, silver medalist(s) | 6 | Germany | Andrea Herzog; Elena Lilik; Nele Bayn | 112.93 | 0 | 112.93 |
| 3rd place, bronze medalist(s) | 1 | Great Britain | Ellis Miller; Kimberley Woods; Bethan Forrow | 113.61 | 2 | 115.61 |
| 4 | 5 | Slovakia | Soňa Stanovská; Emanuela Luknárová; Zuzana Paňková | 111.03 | 6 | 117.03 |
| 5 | 7 | France | Angèle Hug; Doriane Delassus; Lucie Prioux | 118.82 | 0 | 118.82 |
| 6 | 3 | Slovenia | Eva Alina Hočevar; Alja Kozorog; Lea Novak | 119.94 | 0 | 119.94 |
| 7 | 8 | China | Huang Juan; Liu Gaoyi; Wu Yishan | 120.24 | 2 | 122.24 |
| 8 | 4 | Spain | Miren Lazkano; Núria Vilarrubla; Klara Olazabal | 112.34 | 54 | 166.34 |
| 9 | 9 | Australia | Noemie Fox; Kate Eckhardt; Georgia O'Callaghan | 124.27 | 52 | 176.27 |
