= 2022 ICF Canoe Slalom World Championships – Women's C1 team =

Women's canoe teams at the 2022 ICF Canoe Slalom World Championships
- Venue: Augsburg Eiskanal
- Location: Augsburg, Germany
- Dates: 27 July 2022
- Competitors: 30 from 10 nations
- Teams: 10

Medalists
gold medal	Gabriela Satková; Tereza Fišerová; Martina Satková	Czech Republic
silver medal	Elena Lilik; Andrea Herzog; Nele Bayn	Germany
bronze medal	Mallory Franklin; Kimberley Woods; Sophie Ogilvie	Great Britain

The women's canoe team event at the 2022 ICF Canoe Slalom World Championships took place on 27 July 2022 at the Augsburg Eiskanal in Augsburg.

== Competition format ==
Team events use a single run format with the team with the fastest time including penalties awarded gold. Teams consist of three paddlers from the same country.

Penalties are accumulated for each athlete, such that a team can incur a total of 150 seconds of penalties on a single gate (if all three miss it) or 6 seconds (if all three touch it). The time begins when the first paddler crosses the start beam and ends when the last one crosses the finish beam. All three paddlers must cross the finish line within 15 seconds of each other or else incur an additional 50-second penalty.

Team events are generally contested on the same gate setup as the qualification heats of the individual events.

== Results ==
Rank	Bib	Country	Athletes	Result		
Rank	Bib	Country	Athletes	Time	Pen	Total
1st place, gold medalist(s)	1	Czech Republic	Gabriela Satková; Tereza Fišerová; Martina Satková	109.35	6	115.35
2nd place, silver medalist(s)	8	Germany	Elena Lilik; Andrea Herzog; Nele Bayn	116.85	0	116.85
3rd place, bronze medalist(s)	3	Great Britain	Mallory Franklin; Kimberley Woods; Sophie Ogilvie	111.85	6	117.85
4	6	Slovenia	Alja Kozorog; Eva Alina Hočevar; Lea Novak	116.65	2	118.65
5	9	Australia	Jessica Fox; Noemie Fox; Kate Eckhardt	115.81	4	119.81
6	4	Slovakia	Zuzana Paňková; Emanuela Luknárová; Soňa Stanovská	117.54	8	125.54
7	2	Spain	Miren Lazkano; Ainhoa Lameiro; Klara Olazabal	115.18	16	131.18
8	7	China	Huang Yanzhi; Lyu Minzhen; Yang Liu	126.70	18	144.70
9	5	France	Marjorie Delassus; Laurène Roisin; Lucie Baudu	113.43	56	169.43
-	10	India	Jahanvi Shrivastava; Ahna Yadav; Rina Sen	DNS		
