= 2023 ICF Canoe Slalom World Championships – Women's C1 team =

Women's canoe teams at the 2023 ICF Canoe Slalom World Championships
- Venue: Lee Valley White Water Centre
- Location: London, United Kingdom
- Dates: 19 September 2023
- Competitors: 33 from 11 nations
- Teams: 11

Medalists
gold medal	Mallory Franklin; Kimberley Woods; Ellis Miller	Great Britain
silver medal	Gabriela Satková; Tereza Fišerová; Tereza Kneblová	Czech Republic
bronze medal	Eva Alina Hočevar; Alja Kozorog; Lea Novak	Slovenia

The women's canoe team event at the 2023 ICF Canoe Slalom World Championships took place on 19 September 2023 at Lee Valley White Water Centre in London.

== Competition format ==
Team events use a single run format with the team with the fastest time including penalties awarded gold. Teams consist of three paddlers from the same country.

Penalties are accumulated for each athlete, such that a team can incur a total of 150 seconds of penalties on a single gate (if all three miss it) or 6 seconds (if all three touch it). The time begins when the first paddler crosses the start beam and ends when the last one crosses the finish beam. All three paddlers must cross the finish line within 15 seconds of each other or else incur an additional 50-second penalty.

The teams had to navigate a total of 18 gates along the course, including 6 upstream gates (4-7-8-11-14-15).

== Results ==
Rank	Bib	Country	Athletes	Result		
Rank	Bib	Country	Athletes	Time	Pen	Total
1st place, gold medalist(s)	3	Great Britain	Mallory Franklin; Kimberley Woods; Ellis Miller	112.45	0	112.45
2nd place, silver medalist(s)	1	Czech Republic	Gabriela Satková; Tereza Fišerová; Tereza Kneblová	114.55	0	114.55
3rd place, bronze medalist(s)	4	Slovenia	Eva Alina Hočevar; Alja Kozorog; Lea Novak	113.32	2	115.32
4	7	Spain	Miren Lazkano; Núria Vilarrubla; Klara Olazabal	113.62	2	115.62
5	6	Slovakia	Soňa Stanovská; Zuzana Paňková; Emanuela Luknárová	114.70	6	120.70
6	2	Germany	Andrea Herzog; Elena Lilik; Nele Bayn	118.43	4	122.43
7	11	Italy	Marta Bertoncelli; Elena Borghi; Elena Micozzi	121.90	6	127.90
8	9	France	Marjorie Delassus; Angèle Hug; Lucie Prioux	122.06	6	128.06
9	10	Brazil	Ana Sátila; Omira Estácia Neta; Beatriz Da Motta	125.94	10	135.94
10	8	China	Huang Juan; Yang Jie; Yu Cuishan	135.81	4	139.81
11	5	Australia	Jessica Fox; Noemie Fox; Kate Eckhardt	114.50	52	166.50
