= 2024 Canoe Slalom World Cup =

Canoe Slalom World Cup

The 2024 Canoe Slalom World Cup was the highest level season-long series of competitions across six canoe slalom disciplines organized by the International Canoe Federation (ICF). It was the 37th edition and featured five stops (or races) in five different venues.

Canoeists competed for the title of the overall world cup champion in each of the six disciplines (3 for men and 3 for women), which were determined by the total number of points obtained from the five races.

== Calendar ==
The series opened with World Cup Race 1 in Augsburg, Germany (30 May – 2 June) and concluded with the World Cup Final in La Seu, Spain (19-22 September).

Label	Venue	Date
World Cup Race 1	(Germany) Augsburg	30 May –2 June
World Cup Race 2	(Czech Republic) Prague	6–9 June
World Cup Race 3	(Poland) Kraków	13–16 June
World Cup Race 4	(Italy) Ivrea	12–15 September
World Cup Final	(Spain) La Seu	19–22 September

== Standings ==
The winner of each race was awarded 60 points (with double points awarded for the World Cup Final). Points for lower places differed from one category to another.

=== C1 men ===
Pos	Athlete	GER (Germany)	CZE (Czech Republic)	POL (Poland)	ITA (Italy)	ESP (Spain)	Points
1	Matej Beňuš (SVK)	5	6	2	19	4	257
2	Žiga Lin Hočevar (SLO)	1	17	6	10	7	242
3	Ryan Westley (GBR)	14	11	3	33	2	223
4	Marko Mirgorodský (SVK)	2	5	12	14	14	217
5	Luka Božič (SLO)	8	15	5	5	12	216
6	Benjamin Savšek (SLO)	11	2		1	13	207
7	Michal Martikán (SVK)	17	13	15	28	3	193
8	Miquel Travé (ESP)		19	4		1	190
9	Adam Burgess (GBR)	10	16	9	11	19	177
10	Jules Bernardet (FRA)			1	6	9	174

=== C1 women ===
Pos	Athlete	GER (Germany)	CZE (Czech Republic)	POL (Poland)	ITA (Italy)	ESP (Spain)	Points
1	Jessica Fox (AUS)	1	2	1		1	295
2	Martina Satková (CZE)	12	8	3	9	8	231
3	Gabriela Satková (CZE)		1		1	2	230
4	Nele Bayn (GER)	4	7	5	15	19	206
5	Mònica Dòria (AND)	3	18		11	4	199
5	Tereza Kneblová (CZE)	17	16	9	8	9	199
7	Andrea Herzog (GER)	10	3	10	33	14	178
8	Núria Vilarrubla (ESP)	2	27		21	5	176
9	Ellis Miller (GBR)	6	25	12	17	20	160
10	Kimberley Woods (GBR)				2	3	155
10	Marjorie Delassus (FRA)	5	12			7	155
10	Mallory Franklin (GBR)	19	10		14	10	155

=== K1 men ===
Pos	Athlete	GER (Germany)	CZE (Czech Republic)	POL (Poland)	ITA (Italy)	ESP (Spain)	Points
1	Anatole Delassus (FRA)	9	9	5	2	6	260
2	Giovanni De Gennaro (ITA)	7	1		8	3	241
3	Peter Kauzer (SLO)	3	4		3	7	226
4	Jakub Krejčí (CZE)	30	3	3	7	12	222
5	Žiga Lin Hočevar (SLO)	8	62	6	10	4	210
6	Vít Přindiš (CZE)	13	15	2	13	18	203
7	Xabier Ferrazzi (ITA)	12	40	4	16	9	189
8	Finn Butcher (NZL)	2	10	38	38	8	187
8	Lan Tominc (SLO)	23	8	14	4	20	187
10	Mateusz Polaczyk (POL)	15	2		1	26	183

=== K1 women ===
Pos	Athlete	GER (Germany)	CZE (Czech Republic)	POL (Poland)	ITA (Italy)	ESP (Spain)	Points
1	Ricarda Funk (GER)	2	3		2	4	252
2	Emma Vuitton (FRA)	10	1	10	5	9	244
3	Jessica Fox (AUS)	9	2	1		5	239
4	Eva Terčelj (SLO)	21	4		3	2	228
5	Klaudia Zwolińska (POL)	8	11	11	9	12	200
6	Evy Leibfarth (USA)	17	21	9	38	3	186
7	Maialen Chourraut (ESP)		37	2		1	177
8	Kateřina Beková (CZE)	23	10	14	11	13	174
9	Gabriela Satková (CZE)		8		4	6	168
10	Kimberley Woods (GBR)	6	7	26	19	19	167

=== Kayak cross men ===
Pos	Athlete	GER (Germany)	POL (Poland)	ITA (Italy)	ESP (Spain)	Points
1	Joseph Clarke (GBR)	13	5	4	1	216
2	Pedro Gonçalves (BRA)	4	4	8	3	215
3	Mathurin Madoré (FRA)	1	3	17	9	152
4	Jan Rohrer (SUI)	5		5	7	140
5	David Llorente (ESP)	19		13	2	125
6	Mateusz Polaczyk (POL)		28	7	4	124
7	Jonny Dickson (GBR)	59	9	1	10	115
8	Finn Butcher (NZL)	3	6	21	19	97
9	Boris Neveu (FRA)	22			5	84
10	Vít Přindiš (CZE)	10	2	25	50	80

=== Kayak cross women ===
Pos	Athlete	GER (Germany)	POL (Poland)	ITA (Italy)	ESP (Spain)	Points
1	Kimberley Woods (GBR)	17	3	2	2	219
2	Mallory Franklin (GBR)	35	9	1	1	201
3	Jessica Fox (AUS)	18	1		4	154
4	Tereza Kneblová (CZE)	48	2	4	8	152
5	Angèle Hug (FRA)	5	39		3	142
6	Eva Terčelj (SLO)	1		47	10	96
7	Camille Prigent (FRA)	2			9	93
8	Kateřina Beková (CZE)	9	4	9	17	91
9	Marjorie Delassus (FRA)	8			7	85
10	Ricarda Funk (GER)	49		46	5	84

== Points ==
- World Cup points were awarded based on the results of each race at each event as follows:

Position	1st	2nd	3rd	4th	5th	6th	7th	8th	9th	10th
C1 M	60	55	50	46	44	42	40	38	36	34
C1 W	60	55	50	46	44	42	40	38	36	34
K1 M	60	55	50	44	43	42	41	40	39	38
K1 W	60	55	50	46	44	42	40	38	36	34
Kayak cross	60	55	50	45	40	35	30	25	19	17

== Results ==
=== World Cup Race 1 ===
30 May - 2 June in Augsburg, Germany

Event	Gold	Score	Silver	Score	Bronze	Score
C1 men	Žiga Lin Hočevar (SLO)	101.57	Marko Mirgorodský (SVK)	101.84	Nicolas Gestin (FRA)	103.09
C1 women	Jessica Fox (AUS)	110.68	Núria Vilarrubla (ESP)	118.73	Mònica Dòria (AND)	119.19
K1 men	Felix Oschmautz (AUT)	101.66	Finn Butcher (NZL)	102.26	Peter Kauzer (SLO)	102.69
K1 women	Camille Prigent (FRA)	106.41	Ricarda Funk (GER)	106.45	Ana Sátila (BRA)	108.79
Kayak cross men	Mathurin Madoré (FRA)		Dimitri Marx (SUI)		Finn Butcher (NZL)	
Kayak cross women	Eva Terčelj (SLO)		Camille Prigent (FRA)		Evy Leibfarth (USA)	

=== World Cup Race 2 ===
6–9 June in Prague, Czech Republic

Due to floods on the Vltava river, the schedule had to be amended. For the four classic slalom events this meant that there would only be a single run of qualification with the top 10 athletes advancing straight to the final. The kayak cross events served as the qualification tournament for the 2024 Summer Olympics in Paris, with 3 spots up for grabs for both men and women. World cup points were not awarded for the kayak cross.

Event	Gold	Score	Silver	Score	Bronze	Score
C1 men	Jiří Prskavec (CZE)	86.32	Benjamin Savšek (SLO)	87.14	Nicolas Gestin (FRA)	88.43
C1 women	Gabriela Satková (CZE)	96.35	Jessica Fox (AUS)	97.94	Andrea Herzog (GER)	98.43
K1 men	Giovanni De Gennaro (ITA)	79.07	Mateusz Polaczyk (POL)	81.28	Jakub Krejčí (CZE)	81.35
K1 women	Emma Vuitton (FRA)	94.12	Jessica Fox (AUS)	94.29	Ricarda Funk (GER)	94.40
Kayak cross men	Manuel Ochoa (ESP)		Tillmann Röller (GER)		Boris Neveu (FRA)	
Kayak cross women	Angèle Hug (FRA)		Noemie Fox (AUS)		Nikita Setchell (GBR)	

=== World Cup Race 3 ===
13–16 June in Kraków, Poland

Event	Gold	Score	Silver	Score	Bronze	Score
C1 men	Jules Bernardet (FRA)	91.12	Matej Beňuš (SVK)	93.39	Ryan Westley (GBR)	93.94
C1 women	Jessica Fox (AUS)	102.71	Ana Sátila (BRA)	105.99	Martina Satková (CZE)	110.35
K1 men	Joseph Clarke (GBR)	85.33	Vít Přindiš (CZE)	85.86	Jakub Krejčí (CZE)	86.34
K1 women	Jessica Fox (AUS)	93.49	Maialen Chourraut (ESP)	94.24	Ria Sribar (USA)	99.03
Kayak cross men	Martin Dougoud (SUI)		Vít Přindiš (CZE)		Mathurin Madoré (FRA)	
Kayak cross women	Jessica Fox (AUS)		Tereza Kneblová (CZE)		Kimberley Woods (GBR)	

=== World Cup Race 4 ===
12–15 September in Ivrea, Italy

Windy conditions on Friday, 13 September have forced changes in the schedule. The canoe events only had a single run qualification and kayak semifinals and finals were moved to Saturday.

Event	Gold	Score	Silver	Score	Bronze	Score
C1 men	Benjamin Savšek (SLO)	93.05	Yohann Senechault (FRA)	94.06	Raffaello Ivaldi (ITA)	94.49
C1 women	Gabriela Satková (CZE)	100.89	Kimberley Woods (GBR)	106.24	Viktoriia Us (UKR)	108.15
K1 men	Mateusz Polaczyk (POL)	87.34	Anatole Delassus (FRA)	87.82	Peter Kauzer (SLO)	88.45
K1 women	Stefanie Horn (ITA)	96.88	Ricarda Funk (GER)	97.54	Eva Terčelj (SLO)	98.81
Kayak cross men	Jonny Dickson (GBR)		Gaël Adisson (FRA)		Sam Leaver (GBR)	
Kayak cross women	Mallory Franklin (GBR)		Kimberley Woods (GBR)		Noemie Fox (AUS)	

=== World Cup Final ===
19–22 September in La Seu, Spain

Event	Gold	Score	Silver	Score	Bronze	Score
C1 men	Miquel Travé (ESP)	93.51	Ryan Westley (GBR)	94.16	Michal Martikán (SVK)	95.89
C1 women	Jessica Fox (AUS)	104.30	Gabriela Satková (CZE)	104.41	Kimberley Woods (GBR)	106.38
K1 men	Jiří Prskavec (CZE)	87.47	Mathieu Desnos (BRA)	88.80	Giovanni De Gennaro (ITA)	88.85
K1 women	Maialen Chourraut (ESP)	100.30	Eva Terčelj (SLO)	102.67	Evy Leibfarth (USA)	102.69
Kayak cross men	Joseph Clarke (GBR)		David Llorente (ESP)		Pedro Gonçalves (BRA)	
Kayak cross women	Mallory Franklin (GBR)		Kimberley Woods (GBR)		Angèle Hug (FRA)	
