= 2025 Canoe Slalom World Cup =

Canoe Slalom World Cup

The 2025 Canoe Slalom World Cup was the highest level season-long series of competitions across eight canoe slalom disciplines organized by the International Canoe Federation (ICF). It was the 38th edition and featured five stops (or races) in five different venues.

Canoeists competed for the title of the overall world cup champion in each of the eight disciplines (4 for men and 4 for women), which were determined by the total number of points obtained from the five races.

Kayak cross individual was introduced as a new event for this season. It is a kayak cross time trial that is also used as a qualification run for the kayak cross event.

A new progression system was introduced, unified through all 4 classic slalom categories. Instead of 2 qualification heats, followed by a semifinal and a final, there would only be one single qualification heat with the top 12 athletes advancing straight to the final.

== Calendar ==
The series opened with World Cup Race 1 in La Seu, Spain (6-8 June) and concluded with the World Cup Final in Augsburg, Germany (4-7 September).

Label	Venue	Date
World Cup Race 1	(Spain) La Seu	6-8 June
World Cup Race 2	(France) Pau	13-15 June
World Cup Race 3	(Czech Republic) Prague	27-29 June
World Cup Race 4	(Slovenia) Tacen	29-31 August
World Cup Final	(Germany) Augsburg	4-7 September

== Standings ==
The winner of each race was awarded 60 points (with double points awarded for the World Cup Final). Points for lower places differed for kayak cross.

=== C1 men ===
Pos	Athlete	ESP (Spain)	FRA (France)	CZE (Czech Republic)	SLO (Slovenia)	GER (Germany)	Points
1	Nicolas Gestin (FRA)	3	35	1	1	1	292
2	Yohann Senechault (FRA)	4	2	3	2	13	266
3	Miquel Travé (ESP)	8	3	17	7	3	254
4	Mewen Debliquy (FRA)	11	4	2	4	12	241
5	Kacper Sztuba (POL)	7	8	6	8	7	238
6	Adam Burgess (GBR)	2	25	12	12	4	224
7	Matej Beňuš (SVK)	5	42	16	11	2	215
8	Marko Mirgorodský (SVK)	6	14	14	23	13	179
9	Luka Božič (SLO)	1	13	5	45	22	178
10	Adam Král (CZE)	25	26	9	17	8	166
10	Vojtěch Heger (CZE)	24	20	19	3	17	166
10	Ryan Westley (GBR)	21	1	7	13	29	166

=== C1 women ===
Pos	Athlete	ESP (Spain)	FRA (France)	CZE (Czech Republic)	SLO (Slovenia)	GER (Germany)	Points
1	Kimberley Woods (GBR)	14	16	8	3	1	264
2	Zuzana Paňková (SVK)	11	20	1	11	6	231
3	Marta Bertoncelli (ITA)	7	8	25	8	4	223
4	Evy Leibfarth (USA)	15	6	9	7	10	214
5	Miren Lazkano (ESP)	2	5	6	18	21	210
6	Angèle Hug (FRA)	10	3	5	33	16	184
7	Elena Lilik (GER)			11	1	5	180
8	Eva Alina Hočevar (SLO)	37	25	2	16	8	175
9	Núria Vilarrubla (ESP)	9	17	19	20	11	173
10	Elena Borghi (ITA)	6	18	14	35	9	170

=== K1 men ===
Pos	Athlete	ESP (Spain)	FRA (France)	CZE (Czech Republic)	SLO (Slovenia)	GER (Germany)	Points
1	Titouan Castryck (FRA)	1	4	1	1	3	326
2	Anatole Delassus (FRA)	2	2	2	19	1	309
3	Mateusz Polaczyk (POL)	13	8	4	3	4	256
4	Felix Oschmautz (AUT)	16	10	6	5	5	235
5	Jakub Krejčí (CZE)	4	6	22	9	7	225
6	Xabier Ferrazzi (ITA)	8	13	15	11	10	196
7	Noah Hegge (GER)	76	1	68	23	2	193
8	Giovanni De Gennaro (ITA)		7	3	14	9	191
9	Benjamin Renia (FRA)	6	5	12	8	27	177
10	Pau Echaniz (ESP)	7	18	19	17	15	171

=== K1 women ===
Pos	Athlete	ESP (Spain)	FRA (France)	CZE (Czech Republic)	SLO (Slovenia)	GER (Germany)	Points
1	Kimberley Woods (GBR)	18	6	6	1	1	289
2	Lois Leaver (GBR)	21	3	3	7	3	262
3	Evy Leibfarth (USA)	19	4	1	3	7	260
4	Ricarda Funk (GER)	4	1	7	4	13	252
5	Camille Prigent (FRA)	2	31	2	10	4	238
6	Eva Alina Hočevar (SLO)	8	18	4	2	18	214
7	Eva Pietracha (FRA)	33	2	17	15	5	199
8	Emma Vuitton (FRA)	12	22	26	16	6	176
9	Klaudia Zwolińska (POL)		21	5	11	8	174
10	Elena Lilik (GER)			25	5	2	169

=== Kayak cross men ===
Pos	Athlete	ESP (Spain)	FRA (France)	CZE (Czech Republic)	SLO (Slovenia)	GER (Germany)	Points
1	Jonny Dickson (GBR)	2	29	6	10	2	221
2	Jan Rohrer (SUI)	3	7	5	9	5	219
3	Mathurin Madoré (FRA)	17	3	13	1	4	215
4	Sam Leaver (GBR)	9	14	10	4	1	210
5	David Llorente (ESP)	6	4	35	14	7	151
6	Manuel Ochoa (ESP)	1	19	3	27	13	140
7	Matyáš Novák (CZE)	25	2	7	20	9	131
8	Benjamin Renia (FRA)	5	8	25	18	8	123
9	Tillmann Röller (GER)	34	34	12	34	3	119
10	Gelindo Chiarello (SUI)			23	7	6	104

=== Kayak cross women ===
Pos	Athlete	ESP (Spain)	FRA (France)	CZE (Czech Republic)	SLO (Slovenia)	GER (Germany)	Points
1	Ricarda Funk (GER)	7	9	8	9	1	213
2	Kimberley Woods (GBR)	10	25	4	5	4	196
3	Lois Leaver (GBR)	3	28	9	26	3	177
4	Camille Prigent (FRA)	9	7	2	7	11	164
5	Angèle Hug (FRA)	1	14	14	19	5	162
6	Tereza Kneblová (CZE)	2	11	1	30	38	138
7	Andrea Herzog (GER)	21	15		1	7	131
8	Maialen Chourraut (ESP)	26	3	15	4	31	114
9	Kateřina Beková (CZE)					2	110
10	Olga Samková (CZE)	34	4	25	21	8	105
10	Jessica Fox (AUS)	6	5	7			105

=== Kayak cross individual men ===
Pos	Athlete	ESP (Spain)	FRA (France)	CZE (Czech Republic)	SLO (Slovenia)	GER (Germany)	Points
1	Sam Leaver (GBR)	5	2	15	3	2	287
2	Mathurin Madoré (FRA)	10	25	3	17	1	245
3	Jan Rohrer (SUI)	2	8	13	6	9	237
4	Manuel Ochoa (ESP)	4	13	11	11	4	232
5	Benjamin Renia (FRA)	3	15	4	4	13	230
6	David Llorente (ESP)	8	7	35	9	3	216
7	Matyáš Novák (CZE)	7	3	23	14	8	214
8	Jakub Krejčí (CZE)	15	1	2	2	46	202
9	Gabriel De Coster (BEL)	18	17	1		7	191
10	Jonny Dickson (GBR)	1	16	31	15	10	185

=== Kayak cross individual women ===
Pos	Athlete	ESP (Spain)	FRA (France)	CZE (Czech Republic)	SLO (Slovenia)	GER (Germany)	Points
1	Camille Prigent (FRA)	2	1	2	1	11	294
2	Ricarda Funk (GER)	8	6	7	8	2	268
3	Evy Leibfarth (USA)	4	7	6	3	5	266
4	Lois Leaver (GBR)	6	18	16	6	1	256
5	Angèle Hug (FRA)	10	11	9	25	3	217
6	Kimberley Woods (GBR)	13	8	5	5	13	216
7	Soňa Stanovská (SVK)	20	14	3	16	6	213
8	Noemie Fox (AUS)	7	5	14	40	7	195
9	Ajda Novak (SLO)	16	2	33	9	9	192
10	Eva Alina Hočevar (SLO)	3	27	20	2	17	191

== Points ==
- World Cup points were awarded based on the results of each race at each event as follows:

Position	1	2	3	4	5	6	7	8	9	10	11	12	13	14	15	16	17	18	19	20	21	22	23	24	25	26	27	28	29	30	31	32	33+
Slalom and KX individual	60	55	50	46	44	42	40	38	36	34	32	31	30	29	28	27	26	25	24	23	22	21	19	17	15	13	11	9	7	5	2	2	2
Kayak cross	60	55	50	45	40	35	30	25	19	17	15	13	11	9	7	5	4	4	4	4	4	4	4	4	4	4	4	4	4	4	4	4	2

== Results ==
=== World Cup Race 1 ===
6-8 June in La Seu, Spain

Event	Gold	Score	Silver	Score	Bronze	Score
C1 men	Luka Božič (SLO)	87.62	Adam Burgess (GBR)	88.79	Nicolas Gestin (FRA)	89.29
C1 women	Jessica Fox (AUS)	98.42	Miren Lazkano (ESP)	102.52	Martina Satková (CZE)	102.80
K1 men	Titouan Castryck (FRA)	81.90	Anatole Delassus (FRA)	82.78	Lucien Delfour (AUS)	83.56
K1 women	Soňa Stanovská (SVK)	93.50	Camille Prigent (FRA)	94.31	Mònica Dòria (AND)	94.61
Kayak cross men	Manuel Ochoa (ESP)		Jonny Dickson (GBR)		Jan Rohrer (SUI)	
Kayak cross women	Angèle Hug (FRA)		Tereza Kneblová (CZE)		Lois Leaver (GBR)	
Kayak cross individual men	Jonny Dickson (GBR)	47.37	Jan Rohrer (SUI)	47.50	Benjamin Renia (FRA)	47.93
Kayak cross individual women	Miren Lazkano (ESP)	53.32	Camille Prigent (FRA)	53.49	Eva Alina Hočevar (SLO)	53.50

=== World Cup Race 2 ===
13-15 June in Pau, France

Event	Gold	Score	Silver	Score	Bronze	Score
C1 men	Ryan Westley (GBR)	97.74	Yohann Senechault (FRA)	98.13	Miquel Travé (ESP)	98.37
C1 women	Jessica Fox (AUS)	107.62	Gabriela Satková (CZE)	110.89	Angèle Hug (FRA)	111.69
K1 men	Noah Hegge (GER)	91.48	Anatole Delassus (FRA)	92.70	Lucien Delfour (AUS)	93.61
K1 women	Ricarda Funk (GER)	102.00	Eva Pietracha (FRA)	103.22	Lois Leaver (GBR)	103.88
Kayak cross men	Pau Echaniz (ESP)		Matyáš Novák (CZE)		Mathurin Madoré (FRA)	
Kayak cross women	Miren Lazkano (ESP)		Chiara Sabattini (ITA)		Maialen Chourraut (ESP)	
Kayak cross individual men	Jakub Krejčí (CZE)	53.02	Sam Leaver (GBR)	53.12	Matyáš Novák (CZE)	53.41
Kayak cross individual women	Camille Prigent (FRA)	57.91	Ajda Novak (SLO)	58.55	Jessica Fox (AUS)	58.68

=== World Cup Race 3 ===
27-29 June in Prague, Czechia. The short version of canoe slalom debuted at the world cup as an unofficial event.

Event	Gold	Score	Silver	Score	Bronze	Score
C1 men	Nicolas Gestin (FRA)	94.11	Mewen Debliquy (FRA)	94.14	Yohann Senechault (FRA)	94.19
C1 women	Zuzana Paňková (SVK)	103.29	Eva Alina Hočevar (SLO)	103.92	Andrea Herzog (GER)	104.91
K1 men	Titouan Castryck (FRA)	86.35	Anatole Delassus (FRA)	87.38	Giovanni De Gennaro (ITA)	88.94
K1 women	Evy Leibfarth (USA)	97.76	Camille Prigent (FRA)	98.48	Lois Leaver (GBR)	99.78
Kayak cross men	Finn Butcher (NZL)		Martin Rudorfer (CZE)		Manuel Ochoa (ESP)	
Kayak cross women	Tereza Kneblová (CZE)		Camille Prigent (FRA)		Evy Leibfarth (USA)	
Kayak cross individual men	Gabriel De Coster (BEL)	61.65	Jakub Krejčí (CZE)	62.02	Mathurin Madoré (FRA)	62.39
Kayak cross individual women	Jessica Fox (AUS)	66.56	Camille Prigent (FRA)	67.68	Soňa Stanovská (SVK)	67.86
Canoe short men	Adam Burgess (GBR)	52.57	Žiga Lin Hočevar (SLO)	53.00	Nicolas Gestin (FRA)	53.72
Canoe short women	Gabriela Satková (CZE)	59.93	Martina Satková (CZE)	63.46	Andrea Herzog (GER)	63.68
Kayak short men	Jakub Grigar (SVK)	48.71	Gabriel De Coster (BEL)	49.09	Mateusz Polaczyk (POL)	49.43
Kayak short women	Jessica Fox (AUS)	55.61	Klaudia Zwolińska (POL)	58.01	Emily Apel (GER)	58.67

=== World Cup Race 4 ===
29-31 August in Tacen, Slovenia

Event	Gold	Score	Silver	Score	Bronze	Score
C1 men	Nicolas Gestin (FRA)	75.67	Yohann Senechault (FRA)	76.46	Vojtěch Heger (CZE)	78.70
C1 women	Elena Lilik (GER)	86.86	Viktoriia Us (UKR)	87.78	Kimberley Woods (GBR)	88.19
K1 men	Titouan Castryck (FRA)	70.24	Žiga Lin Hočevar (SLO)	72.63	Mateusz Polaczyk (POL)	73.52
K1 women	Kimberley Woods (GBR)	78.69	Eva Alina Hočevar (SLO)	79.42	Evy Leibfarth (USA)	82.45
Kayak cross men	Mathurin Madoré (FRA)		Jan Ločnikar (SLO)		Alex Baldoni (CAN)	
Kayak cross women	Andrea Herzog (GER)		Momoka Nagasu (JPN)		Nikita Setchell (GBR)	
Kayak cross individual men	Joseph Clarke (GBR)	50.35	Jakub Krejčí (CZE)	51.25	Sam Leaver (GBR)	51.30
Kayak cross individual women	Camille Prigent (FRA)	56.20	Eva Alina Hočevar (SLO)	57.46	Evy Leibfarth (USA)	57.50

=== World Cup Final ===
4-7 September in Augsburg, Germany

A different progression system was used for the World Cup Final in classic slalom events. Top 30 from a single qualification run qualified for the semifinal and then top 12 from the semifinal advanced to the final. Double points were awarded for each race.

Event	Gold	Score	Silver	Score	Bronze	Score
C1 men	Nicolas Gestin (FRA)	97.40	Matej Beňuš (SVK)	101.98	Miquel Travé (ESP)	102.97
C1 women	Kimberley Woods (GBR)	115.92	Ana Sátila (BRA)	118.16	Doriane Delassus (FRA)	121.82
K1 men	Anatole Delassus (FRA)	93.50	Noah Hegge (GER)	93.66	Titouan Castryck (FRA)	93.92
K1 women	Kimberley Woods (GBR)	104.55	Elena Lilik (GER)	107.73	Lois Leaver (GBR)	108.01
Kayak cross men	Sam Leaver (GBR)		Jonny Dickson (GBR)		Tillmann Röller (GER)	
Kayak cross women	Ricarda Funk (GER)		Kateřina Beková (CZE)		Lois Leaver (GBR)	
Kayak cross individual men	Mathurin Madoré (FRA)	64.41	Sam Leaver (GBR)	64.49	David Llorente (ESP)	64.60
Kayak cross individual women	Lois Leaver (GBR)	69.35	Ricarda Funk (GER)	69.53	Angèle Hug (FRA)	70.06
