= Flavio Micozzi =

Italian canoeist (born 2000)

Personal information
- Nationality: Italian
- Born: 15 July 2000 (age 26)

Sport
- Sport: Canoe slalom
- Event: C1
Medal record
Men's Canoe slalom
Representing Italy
| Event | 1st | 2nd | 3rd |
|---|---|---|---|
| European Championships | 0 | 1 | 1 |
| U23 World Championships | 1 | 0 | 1 |
| U23 European Championships | 1 | 0 | 0 |
| Junior World Championships | 1 | 1 | 0 |
| Junior European Championships | 0 | 0 | 1 |
| Total | 3 | 2 | 3 |
European Championships
| Silver medal – second place | 2021 Ivrea | C1 team |
| Bronze medal – third place | 2026 Ivrea | C1 team |
U23 World Championships
| Gold medal – first place | 2019 Kraków | C1 team |
| Bronze medal – third place | 2023 Kraków | C1 team |
U23 European Championships
| Gold medal – first place | 2019 Liptovský Mikuláš | C1 team |
Junior World Championships
| Gold medal – first place | 2018 Ivrea | Mixed C2 |
| Silver medal – second place | 2018 Ivrea | C1 |
Junior European Championships
| Bronze medal – third place | 2018 Bratislava | C1 |

Flavio Micozzi (born 15 July 2000) is an Italian slalom canoeist who has competed at the international level since 2017.

== Career ==
Micozzi competed at the 2018 World Junior Canoe Slalom Championships and won a gold medal in the mixed C2 event, along with his sister, Elena Micozzi.

In July 2026, he competed at the 2026 ICF Canoe Slalom World Championships and finished in fifth place in the C1 event with a time of 91.36 seconds. In September 2026, he competed at the 2026 Paddle Europe Slalom Championships and won a bronze medal in the C1 team event, along with Raffaello Ivaldi and Elio Maiutto.

== Personal life ==
Micozzi's younger sister, Elena Micozzi, is also a slalom canoeist.
