= Canoeing at the 2015 Pan American Games – Women's slalom C-1 =

Women's slalom C-1 at the 2015 Pan American Games
- Venue: Minden Wild Water Preserve
- Dates: July 18–19
- Competitors: 6 from 6 nations
- Winning time: 113.01

Medalists
Gold medal	Ana Sátila	Brazil
Silver medal	Colleen Hickey	United States
Bronze medal	Haley Daniels	Canada

The women's slalom C-1 canoeing event at the 2015 Pan American Games will be held between the 18 and 19 of July at the Minden Wild Water Preserve in Minden Hills. At the Pan American Sports Organization's 2013 general assembly in Jamaica, canoe slalom competitions were added to the program. This will be the first time slalom has been staged at the Pan American Games. Furthermore, women will also compete in canoe races for the first time ever in both disciplines. The winners of the four canoe slalom competitions (besides the C-1 women event, which is not an Olympic event) will qualify for the 2016 Summer Olympics in Rio de Janeiro, Brazil. If the host nation of the Olympics (Brazil) wins the event, the runner up will qualify instead.

== Schedule ==
The following is the competition schedule for the event:

All times are Eastern Daylight Time (UTC−4)

Date	Time	Round
July 18, 2015	10:55	Heat–Run 1
July 18, 2015	12:27	Heat–Run 2
July 19, 2015	10:55	Semi-final
July 19, 2015	13:33	Final

== Results ==
=== Heat ===
Rank	Name	Nation	Run 1			Run 2			Best	Notes
Rank	Name	Nation	Time	Pen.	Total	Time	Pen.	Total	Best	Notes
1	Ana Sátila	Brazil	102.31	8	110.31			DNS	110.31	Q
2	Colleen Hickey	United States	122.43	58	180.43	127.95	4	131.95	131.95	Q
3	Haley Daniels	Canada	142.62	106	248.62	124.69	52	176.69	176.69	Q
4	Ana Fernández	Paraguay	153.92	160	313.92	194.49	12	206.49	206.49	Q
5	Maria Sol Cassini	Argentina	155.56	172	327.56	161.81	158	319.81	319.81	Q
6	Siranush Mamed Paredes	Venezuela	137.24	558	695.24	201.18	458	659.18	659.18	

=== Semifinal ===
Rank	Name	Nation	Time	Pen.	Total	Notes
1	Ana Sátila	Brazil	118.32	6	124.32	Q
2	Colleen Hickey	United States	145.69	2	147.69	Q
3	Haley Daniels	Canada	129.24	56	185.24	Q
4	Maria Sol Cassini	Argentina	163.33	58	221.33	Q
5	Ana Fernández	Paraguay	189.03	58	247.03	

=== Final ===
Rank	Name	Nation	Time	Pen.	Total	Notes
1st place, gold medalist(s)	Ana Sátila	Brazil	111.01	2	113.01	
2nd place, silver medalist(s)	Colleen Hickey	United States	125.43	6	131.43	
3rd place, bronze medalist(s)	Haley Daniels	Canada	137.65	6	143.65	
4	Maria Sol Cassini	Argentina	215.10	110	325.10	
