= 2020 European Canoe Slalom Championships =

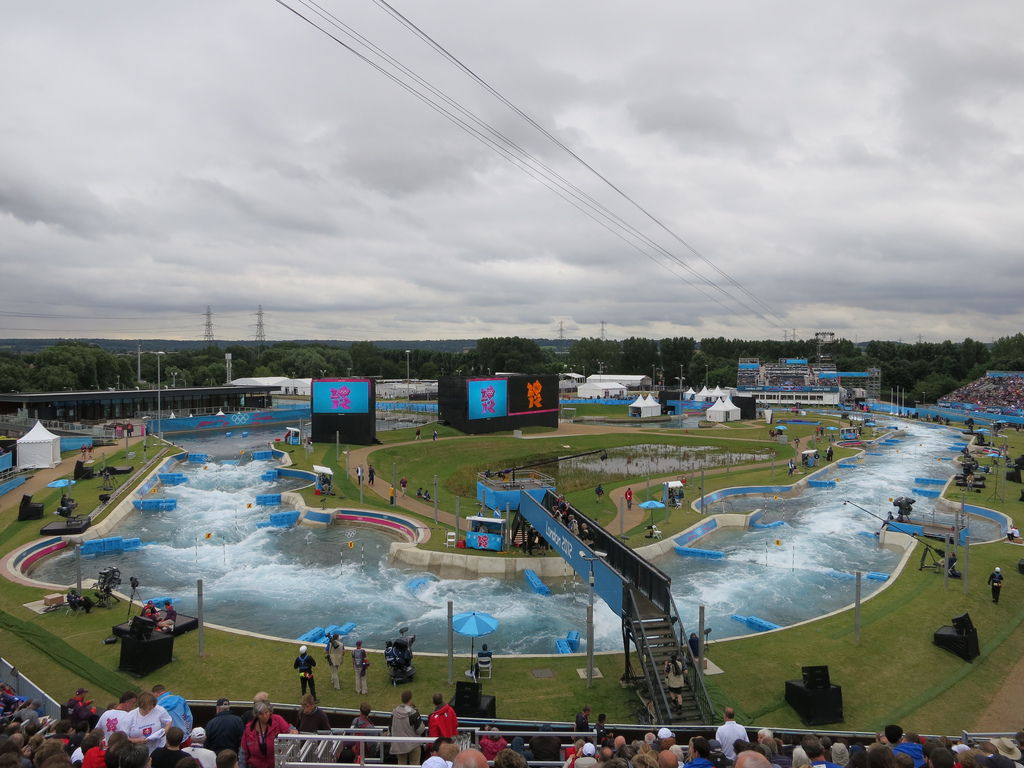
Lee Valley White Water Centre - 2012 Olympic C-1 Final

The 2020 European Canoe Slalom Championships took place in Prague, Czech Republic from 18 to 20 September 2020. Originally they were scheduled to take place in London, England, from 15 to 17 May 2020. However, on 18 March, the European Canoe Association announced that the event had been cancelled, due to the COVID-19 pandemic. Later on it was announced that the event would be held in Prague instead of one of the rounds of the World Cup series.

It was the 21st edition of the competition, and took place at the Prague-Troja Canoeing Centre.

Several leading countries (including Germany, Great Britain and Slovakia) decided not to participate in the event due to COVID related concerns.

== Medal summary ==
=== Men ===
==== Canoe ====
Event	Gold		Silver		Bronze	
C1	Benjamin Savšek; Slovenia	104.90	Lukáš Rohan; Czech Republic	108.66	Václav Chaloupka; Czech Republic	109.52
C1 team	Slovenia; Benjamin Savšek; Luka Božič; Jure Lenarčič	120.43	Ireland; Liam Jegou; Robert Hendrick; Jake Cochrane	135.83	Poland; Grzegorz Hedwig; Kacper Sztuba; Szymon Zawadzki	150.58

==== Kayak ====
Event	Gold		Silver		Bronze	
K1	Jiří Prskavec; Czech Republic	97.97	Peter Kauzer; Slovenia	98.49	Mateusz Polaczyk; Poland	99.06
K1 team	France; Boris Neveu; Quentin Burgi; Mathurin Madoré	110.93	Czech Republic; Jiří Prskavec; Vít Přindiš; Vavřinec Hradilek	112.38	Switzerland; Martin Dougoud; Lukas Werro; Dimitri Marx	114.14

=== Women ===
==== Canoe ====
Event	Gold		Silver		Bronze	
C1	Gabriela Satková; Czech Republic	121.75	Tereza Fišerová; Czech Republic	122.05	Lucie Prioux; France	130.03
C1 team	Czech Republic; Tereza Fišerová; Gabriela Satková; Tereza Kneblová	139.11	Slovenia; Alja Kozorog; Eva Alina Hočevar; Lea Novak	164.07	France; Lucie Baudu; Claire Jacquet; Lucie Prioux	210.44

==== Kayak ====
Event	Gold		Silver		Bronze	
K1	Kateřina Kudějová; Czech Republic	112.71	Camille Prigent; France	114.61	Amálie Hilgertová; Czech Republic	115.43
K1 team	Czech Republic; Kateřina Kudějová; Veronika Vojtová; Antonie Galušková	139.64	France; Camille Prigent; Lucie Baudu; Marjorie Delassus	140.67	Austria; Corinna Kuhnle; Nina Weratschnig; Antonia Oschmautz	145.47

== Medals Table ==
Rank	Nation	Gold	Silver	Bronze	Total
1	Czech Republic (CZE)	5	3	2	10
2	Slovenia (SLO)	2	2	0	4
3	France (FRA)	1	2	2	5
4	Ireland (IRL)	0	1	0	1
5	Poland (POL)	0	0	2	2
6	Austria (AUT)	0	0	1	1
6	Switzerland (SUI)	0	0	1	1
Totals (7 entries)		8	8	8	24

== See also ==
- Impact of the COVID-19 pandemic on sports
