= Luc Royle =

British slalom canoeist

Personal information
- Nationality: British
- Born: 6 April 2003 (age 23)

Sport
- Country: Great Britain
- Sport: Canoe slalom
- Event: C1
Medal record
Men's canoe slalom
Representing the United Kingdom
World Championships
Silver medal – second place	2025 Penrith	C1 team
European Championships
Gold medal – first place	2025 Vaires-sur-Marne	C1 team
U23 European Championships
Bronze medal – third place	2024 Kraków	C1 team

Luc Royle (born 6 April 2003) is a British slalom canoeist who has competed at the international level since 2021, specializing in the C1 event.

He won a silver medal in the C1 team at the 2025 World Championships in Penrith. He also won a gold medal in the same event at the 2025 European Championships in Vaires-sur-Marne.
