= Haley Daniels =

Canadian canoeist (born 1990)

Personal information
- Nationality: Canadian
- Born: 14 December 1990 (age 35) Calgary, Alberta

Sport
- Country: Canada
- Sport: Canoe slalom
- Event: C1, K1
Medal record
Women's canoe slalom
Representing Canada
Pan American Games
Bronze medal – third place	2015 Toronto	C1

Haley Daniels (born 14 December 1990) is a Canadian slalom canoeist who has competed at the international level since 2010.

Daniels started canoeing at age 6 and competing at age 12 in Calgary. She made her senior international debut in 2008 and won the bronze medal in the Pan American Games, Toronto, in 2015. With women's canoeing events finally added to the Olympic slate for the 2020 Tokyo Games Daniels secured qualification for the delayed event in June 2021. Daniels represented Canada in the inaugural edition of the C1 event at the Tokyo Games, finishing in 22nd place after being eliminated in the heats.

== Personal life ==
Her grandfather was a Grey Cup Champion playing for the Toronto Argos in the 1950 mud bowl. He also played for the Winnipeg Blue Bombers and Montreal Alouettes football teams.
