= Ben Haylett =

British slalom canoeist

Personal information
- Nationality: British
- Born: 24 August 2001 (age 25)

Sport
- Country: Great Britain
- Sport: Canoe slalom
- Event: K1, Kayak cross
Medal record
Men's canoe slalom
Representing the United Kingdom
World Championships
Bronze medal – third place	2025 Penrith	K1 team
European Championships
Bronze medal – third place	2026 Ivrea	K1 team
U23 World Championships
Silver medal – second place	2024 Liptovský Mikuláš	K1 team
U23 European Championships
Gold medal – first place	2024 Kraków	K1
Gold medal – first place	2024 Kraków	K1 team
Bronze medal – third place	2022 České Budějovice	K1 team
Bronze medal – third place	2023 Bratislava	K1 team
Junior World Championships
Gold medal – first place	2019 Kraków	K1 team

Ben Haylett (born 24 August 2001) is a British slalom canoeist who has competed at the international level since 2016, specializing in K1 and kayak cross events.

He won a bronze medal in the K1 team event at the 2025 World Championships in Penrith. He also won a bronze medal in the K1 team event at the 2026 European Championships in Ivrea.
