= 2018 World Junior and U23 Canoe Slalom Championships =

The 2018 ICF World Junior and U23 Canoe Slalom Championships took place in Ivrea, Italy from 17 to 22 July 2018 under the auspices of the International Canoe Federation (ICF). It was the 20th edition of the competition for Juniors (U18) and the 7th edition for the Under 23 category.

A total of 22 medal events took place, 11 in each of the two age categories. It was the first time that there were no men's C2 events at these championships. The mixed C2 event for juniors as well as the four Extreme K1 events were included in the program for the first time.

== Medal summary ==
=== Men ===
==== Canoe ====
===== Junior =====
Event	Gold		Silver		Bronze	
C1	Miquel Travé (ESP)	81.98	Flavio Micozzi (ITA)	85.82	Nicolas Gestin (FRA)	86.23
C1 team	France; Nicolas Gestin; Jules Bernardet; Alexis Bobon	97.58	Czech Republic; Vojtěch Heger; Petr Novotný; Eduard Lerch	103.72	Slovenia; Urh Turnšek; Nejc Polenčič; Jaka Bernat	105.91

===== U23 =====
Event	Gold		Silver		Bronze	
C1	Václav Chaloupka (CZE)	80.57	Raffaello Ivaldi (ITA)	81.28	Cédric Joly (FRA)	83.91
C1 team	Germany; Lennard Tuchscherer; Leon Hanika; Timo Trummer	94.78	France; Cédric Joly; Lucas Roisin; Valentin Marteil	97.21	Great Britain; Thomas Abbott; William Smith; Samuel Ibbotson	99.03

==== Kayak ====
===== Junior =====
Event	Gold		Silver		Bronze	
K1	Jan Bárta (CZE)	79.40	Anatole Delassus (FRA)	80.32	Tomáš Zima (CZE)	81.00
K1 team	France; Julien Pajaud; Vincent Delahaye; Anatole Delassus	93.30	Czech Republic; Tomáš Zima; Jakub Krejčí; Jan Bárta	93.59	Germany; Tim Bremer; Joshua Dietz; Maximilian Dilli	95.63
Extreme K1	Jan Rohrer (SUI)		Jakub Krejčí (CZE)		Pau Echaniz (ESP)	

===== U23 =====
Event	Gold		Silver		Bronze	
K1	Jakob Weger (ITA)	77.22	Bradley Forbes-Cryans (GBR)	77.26	Erik Holmer (SWE)	80.85
K1 team	France; Mathurin Madoré; Malo Quéméneur; Clément Travert	88.21	Italy; Marcello Beda; Davide Ghisetti; Jakob Weger	90.31	Austria; Mario Leitner; Felix Oschmautz; Matthias Weger	91.71
Extreme K1	Dimitri Marx (SUI)		Malo Quéméneur (FRA)		Nikita Inkin (RUS)	

=== Women ===
==== Canoe ====
===== Junior =====
Event	Gold		Silver		Bronze	
C1	Gabriela Satková (CZE)	100.45	Marta Bertoncelli (ITA)	101.24	Soňa Stanovská (SVK)	104.55
C1 team	Czech Republic; Gabriela Satková; Tereza Kneblová; Eva Říhová	119.13	Great Britain; Bethan Forrow; Ellis Miller; Daisy Cooil	127.94	France; Laurène Roisin; Doriane Delassus; Angèle Hug	129.38

===== U23 =====
Event	Gold		Silver		Bronze	
C1	Nadine Weratschnig (AUT)	94.37	Kimberley Woods (GBR)	98.17	Noemie Fox (AUS)	99.18
C1 team	Spain; Miren Lazkano; Klara Olazabal; Annebel van der Knijff	117.27	Slovenia; Eva Alina Hočevar; Lea Novak; Nina Bizjak	119.03	Czech Republic; Tereza Fišerová; Jana Matulková; Martina Satková	123.64

==== Kayak ====
===== Junior =====
Event	Gold		Silver		Bronze	
K1	Eva Alina Hočevar (SLO)	89.67	Soňa Stanovská (SVK)	93.23	Naemi Brändle (SUI)	94.20
K1 team	Czech Republic; Antonie Galušková; Lucie Nesnídalová; Kateřina Beková	109.38	Slovenia; Eva Alina Hočevar; Lea Novak; Sara Belingar	109.70	Italy; Francesca Malaguti; Marta Bertoncelli; Elena Borghi	110.40
Extreme K1	Kateřina Beková (CZE)		Alix Degremont (FRA)		River Mutton (NZL)	

===== U23 =====
Event	Gold		Silver		Bronze	
K1	Camille Prigent (FRA)	89.31	Lisa Leitner (AUT)	92.64	Kimberley Woods (GBR)	94.91
K1 team	Slovakia; Eliška Mintálová; Michaela Haššová; Lucia Murzová	109.67	Czech Republic; Amálie Hilgertová; Karolína Galušková; Kateřina Dušková	112.84	Great Britain; Kimberley Woods; Megan Hamer-Evans; Sophie Ogilvie	112.88
Extreme K1	Ana Sátila (BRA)		Selina Jones (GER)		Amálie Hilgertová (CZE)	

=== Mixed ===
==== Canoe ====
===== Junior =====
Event	Gold		Silver		Bronze	
C2	Elena Micozzi/Flavio Micozzi (ITA)	113.77	Jules Bernardet/Doriane Delassus (FRA)	120.88	Ainhoa Lameiro/Pau Echaniz (ESP)	130.29

===== U23 =====
Event	Gold		Silver		Bronze	
C2	Miren Lazkano/David Llorente (ESP)	103.08	Elizaveta Terekhova/Igor Mikhailov (RUS)	111.66	Wu Wenpeng/Yan Jiahua (CHN)	112.69

== Medal table ==
Rank	Nation	Gold	Silver	Bronze	Total
1	Czech Republic (CZE)	6	4	3	13
2	France (FRA)	4	5	3	12
3	Spain (ESP)	3	0	2	5
4	Italy (ITA)	2	4	1	7
5	Switzerland (SUI)	2	0	1	3
6	Slovenia (SLO)	1	2	1	4
7	Austria (AUT)	1	1	1	3
7	Germany (GER)	1	1	1	3
7	Slovakia (SVK)	1	1	1	3
10	Brazil (BRA)	1	0	0	1
11	Great Britain (GBR)	0	3	3	6
12	Russia (RUS)	0	1	1	2
13	Australia (AUS)	0	0	1	1
13	China (CHN)	0	0	1	1
13	New Zealand (NZL)	0	0	1	1
13	Sweden (SWE)	0	0	1	1
Totals (16 entries)		22	22	22	66
