= 2019 World Junior and U23 Canoe Slalom Championships =

The 2019 ICF World Junior and U23 Canoe Slalom Championships took place in Kraków, Poland from 16 to 21 July 2019 under the auspices of the International Canoe Federation (ICF) at the Kraków-Kolna Canoe Slalom Course. It was the 21st edition of the competition for Juniors (U18) and the 8th edition for the Under 23 category.

A total of 22 medal events took place, 11 in each of the two age categories.

== Medal summary ==
=== Men ===
==== Canoe ====
===== Junior =====
| Event | Gold | | Silver | | Bronze | |
|---|---|---|---|---|---|---|
| C1 | Nejc Polenčič; Slovenia | 98.47 | Szymon Nowobilski; Poland | 99.22 | Adrien Fischer; France | 99.26 |
| C1 team | France; Yohann Senechault; Adrien Fischer; Hector Combes | 100.74 | Germany; Benjamin Kies; Julian Lindolf; Felix Göttling | 101.64 | Great Britain; Kurts Rozentals; James Kettle; Alfie Boote | 103.30 |

===== U23 =====
| Event | Gold | | Silver | | Bronze | |
|---|---|---|---|---|---|---|
| C1 | Nicolas Gestin; France | 90.39 | Lucas Roisin; France | 91.34 | Liam Jegou; Ireland | 91.97 |
| C1 team | Italy; Raffaello Ivaldi; Paolo Ceccon; Flavio Micozzi | 94.69 | Slovakia; Marko Mirgorodský; Martin Dodok; Ľudovít Macúš | 96.51 | Czech Republic; Vojtěch Heger; Václav Chaloupka; Jan Větrovský | 96.53 |

==== Kayak ====
===== Junior =====
| Event | Gold | | Silver | | Bronze | |
|---|---|---|---|---|---|---|
| K1 | Anatole Delassus; France | 85.15 | Jakub Krejčí; Czech Republic | 85.42 | Vid Oštrbenk; Slovenia | 89.61 |
| K1 team | Great Britain; Jonny Dickson; Ben Haylett; Etienne Chappell | 91.49 | Czech Republic; Jakub Krejčí; Jakub Mrázek; Martin Rudorfer | 94.25 | Germany; Maximilian Dilli; Paul Bretzinger; Tillmann Röller | 95.41 |
| Extreme K1 | Etienne Chappell; Great Britain | | Egor Smirnov; Russia | | Jakob Hein; Germany | |

===== U23 =====
| Event | Gold | | Silver | | Bronze | |
|---|---|---|---|---|---|---|
| K1 | Pol Oulhen; France | 86.02 | Mathurin Madoré; France | 86.32 | Mario Leitner; Austria | 87.72 |
| K1 team | France; Mathurin Madoré; Malo Quéméneur; Pol Oulhen | 89.83 | Slovenia; Niko Testen; Žan Jakše; Vid Kuder Marušič | 90.72 | Spain; David Llorente; Unai Nabaskues; Manuel Ochoa | 92.23 |
| Extreme K1 | Sergey Maimistov; Russia | | Matthias Weger; Austria | | Tine Kancler; Slovenia | |

=== Women ===
==== Canoe ====
===== Junior =====
| Event | Gold | | Silver | | Bronze | |
|---|---|---|---|---|---|---|
| C1 | Gabriela Satková; Czech Republic | 105.15 | Tereza Kneblová; Czech Republic | 107.73 | Marta Bertoncelli; Italy | 109.93 |
| C1 team | Italy; Marta Bertoncelli; Elena Borghi; Elena Micozzi | 120.44 | Slovakia; Emanuela Luknárová; Ivana Chlebová; Zuzana Paňková | 129.66 | Czech Republic; Gabriela Satková; Tereza Kneblová; Adéla Králová | 130.74 |

===== U23 =====
| Event | Gold | | Silver | | Bronze | |
|---|---|---|---|---|---|---|
| C1 | Ana Sátila; Brazil | 101.06 | Alsu Minazova; Russia | 104.45 | Monika Škáchová; Slovakia | 105.95 |
| C1 team | Czech Republic; Tereza Fišerová; Eva Říhová; Martina Satková | 108.52 | France; Lucie Prioux; Marjorie Delassus; Margaux Henry | 112.06 | Australia; Noemie Fox; Kate Eckhardt; Demelza Wall | 119.54 |

==== Kayak ====
===== Junior =====
| Event | Gold | | Silver | | Bronze | |
|---|---|---|---|---|---|---|
| K1 | Antonie Galušková; Czech Republic | 100.91 | Eva Alina Hočevar; Slovenia | 102.00 | Evy Leibfarth; United States | 102.35 |
| K1 team | France; Emma Vuitton; Doriane Delassus; Eva Pietracha | 105.41 | Czech Republic; Antonie Galušková; Lucie Nesnídalová; Kateřina Beková | 106.21 | Great Britain; Lois Leaver; Ellis Miller; Bethan Forrow | 107.40 |
| Extreme K1 | Evy Leibfarth; United States | | Antonia Oschmautz; Austria | | Kateřina Beková; Czech Republic | |

===== U23 =====
| Event | Gold | | Silver | | Bronze | |
|---|---|---|---|---|---|---|
| K1 | Amálie Hilgertová; Czech Republic | 95.22 | Klaudia Zwolińska; Poland | 95.76 | Selina Jones; Germany | 98.34 |
| K1 team | France; Camille Prigent; Romane Prigent; Marjorie Delassus | 104.77 | Czech Republic; Amálie Hilgertová; Tereza Fišerová; Gabriela Satková | 107.20 | Germany; Anna Faber; Stella Mehlhorn; Selina Jones | 108.21 |
| Extreme K1 | Ana Sátila; Brazil | | Amálie Hilgertová; Czech Republic | | Tereza Fišerová; Czech Republic | |

=== Mixed ===
==== Canoe ====
===== Junior =====
| Event | Gold | | Silver | | Bronze | |
|---|---|---|---|---|---|---|
| C2 | Tereza Kneblová/Martin Kratochvíl; Czech Republic | 121.90 | Daniel Urban/Ivana Kloboučková; Czech Republic | 131.48 | Zuzanna Kulig/Kacper Zachwieja; Poland | 133.85 |

===== U23 =====
| Event | Gold | | Silver | | Bronze | |
|---|---|---|---|---|---|---|
| C2 | Jana Matulková/Vojtěch Mrůzek; Czech Republic | 120.45 | Vojtěch Heger/Antonie Galušková; Czech Republic | 123.43 | Daria Shaidurova/Igor Mikhailov; Russia | 126.21 |

== Medal table ==
| Rank | Nation | Gold | Silver | Bronze | Total |
|---|---|---|---|---|---|
| 1 | France (FRA) | 7 | 3 | 1 | 11 |
| 2 | Czech Republic (CZE) | 6 | 8 | 4 | 18 |
| 3 | Great Britain (GBR) | 2 | 0 | 2 | 4 |
| 4 | Italy (ITA) | 2 | 0 | 1 | 3 |
| 5 | Brazil (BRA) | 2 | 0 | 0 | 2 |
| 6 | Slovenia (SLO) | 1 | 2 | 2 | 5 |
| 7 | Russia (RUS) | 1 | 2 | 1 | 4 |
| 8 | United States (USA) | 1 | 0 | 1 | 2 |
| 9 | Austria (AUT) | 0 | 2 | 1 | 3 |
| 9 | Poland (POL) | 0 | 2 | 1 | 3 |
| 9 | Slovakia (SVK) | 0 | 2 | 1 | 3 |
| 12 | Germany (GER) | 0 | 1 | 4 | 5 |
| 13 | Australia (AUS) | 0 | 0 | 1 | 1 |
| 13 | Ireland (IRL) | 0 | 0 | 1 | 1 |
| 13 | Spain (ESP) | 0 | 0 | 1 | 1 |
| Totals (15 entries) | | 22 | 22 | 22 | 66 |
