= Camille Prigent =

French kayaker (born 1997)

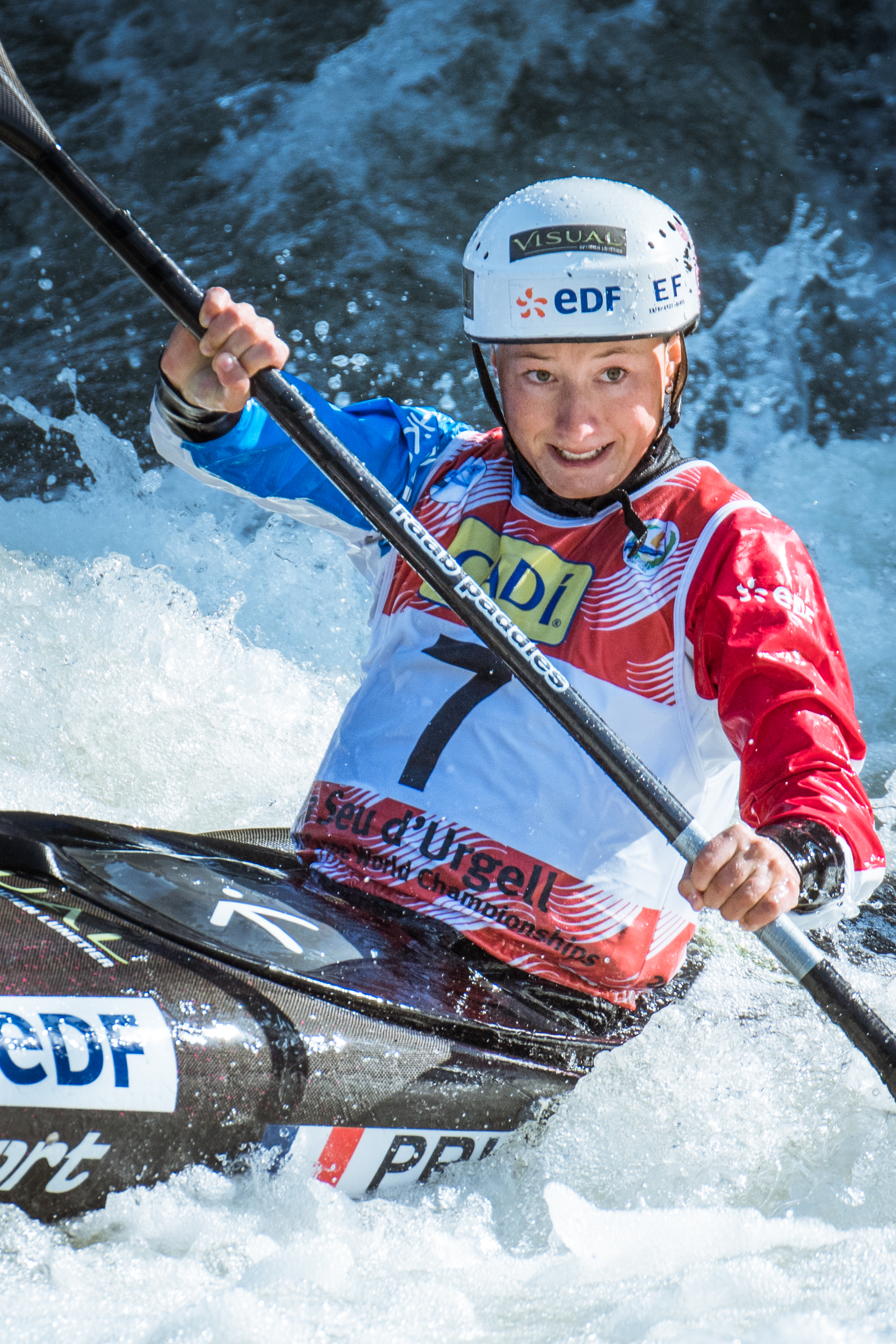

Personal information
- Nationality: French
- Born: 18 December 1997 (age 28) Rennes, France

Sport
- Country: France
- Sport: Canoe slalom
- Event: K1
Medal record
Women's canoe slalom
Representing France
World Championships
| Gold medal – first place | 2018 Rio de Janeiro | K1 team |
| Silver medal – second place | 2023 London | Kayak cross |
| Silver medal – second place | 2025 Penrith | Kayak cross |
| Silver medal – second place | 2026 Oklahoma City | K1 team |
European Games
| Gold medal – first place | 2023 Kraków | K1 team |
European Championships
| Gold medal – first place | 2019 Pau | K1 team |
| Gold medal – first place | 2022 Liptovský Mikuláš | K1 team |
| Gold medal – first place | 2025 Vaires-sur-Marne | Kayak cross |
| Gold medal – first place | 2025 Vaires-sur-Marne | Kayak cross individual |
| Silver medal – second place | 2020 Prague | K1 |
| Silver medal – second place | 2020 Prague | K1 team |
| Silver medal – second place | 2024 Tacen | Kayak cross |
| Silver medal – second place | 2024 Tacen | K1 team |
| Bronze medal – third place | 2017 Tacen | K1 team |
| Bronze medal – third place | 2024 Tacen | Kayak cross individual |
| Bronze medal – third place | 2026 Ivrea | K1 team |
Youth Olympic Games
| Gold medal – first place | 2014 Nanjing | K1 |
U23 World Championships
| Gold medal – first place | 2018 Ivrea | K1 |
| Gold medal – first place | 2019 Kraków | K1 team |
| Bronze medal – third place | 2016 Kraków | K1 team |
U23 European Championships
| Gold medal – first place | 2018 Bratislava | K1 team |
| Bronze medal – third place | 2017 Hohenlimburg | K1 |
Junior World Championships
| Bronze medal – third place | 2013 Liptovský Mikuláš | K1 |
| Bronze medal – third place | 2014 Penrith | K1 team |
| Bronze medal – third place | 2015 Foz do Iguaçu | K1 |
Junior European Championships
| Bronze medal – third place | 2014 Skopje | K1 |

Camille Prigent (born 18 December 1997) is a French slalom canoeist who has competed at the international level since 2013.

She won four medals at the ICF Canoe Slalom World Championships with one gold (K1 team: 2018) and three silvers (kayak cross: 2023, 2025; K1 team: 2026). She also won 12 medals at the European Championships (5 golds, 4 silvers and 3 bronzes), including a gold in the K1 team event at the 2023 European Games in Kraków.

Prigent won the overall World Cup title in kayak cross individual in 2025 and in kayak cross in 2026.

She competed at the 2024 Summer Olympics in Paris, finishing 6th in the K1 event and 9th in kayak cross.

Her father Jean-Yves is a former slalom canoeist and medalist from World Championships. Her older brother Yves is also a slalom canoeist and a medalist from World Championships. Her cousin Lily Ramonatxo is a successful rhythmic gymnast.

== Results ==
=== World Cup individual podiums ===
| | 1st place, gold medalist(s) | 2nd place, silver medalist(s) | 3rd place, bronze medalist(s) | Total |
| K1 | 1 | 6 | 1 | 8 |
| Kayak cross | 2 | 2 | 0 | 4 |
| Kayak cross individual | 3 | 2 | 0 | 5 |
| Total | 6 | 10 | 1 | 17 |

| Season | Date | Venue | Position | Event |
|---|---|---|---|---|
| 2020 | 17 October 2020 | Tacen | 2nd | K1 |
| 2022 | 11 June 2022 | Prague | 3rd | K1 |
| 2022 | 3 September 2022 | La Seu d'Urgell | 2nd | K1 |
| 2024 | 31 May 2024 | Augsburg | 1st | K1 |
| 2024 | 2 June 2024 | Augsburg | 2nd | Kayak cross |
| 2025 | 6 June 2025 | La Seu d'Urgell | 2nd | K1 |
| 2025 | 8 June 2025 | La Seu d'Urgell | 2nd | Kayak cross individual |
| 2025 | 15 June 2025 | Pau | 1st | Kayak cross individual |
| 2025 | 28 June 2025 | Prague | 2nd | K1 |
| 2025 | 29 June 2025 | Prague | 2nd | Kayak cross individual |
| 2025 | 29 June 2025 | Prague | 2nd | Kayak cross |
| 2025 | 31 August 2025 | Tacen | 1st | Kayak cross individual |
| 2026 | 31 May 2026 | Tacen | 1st | Kayak cross individual |
| 2026 | 7 June 2026 | Prague | 1st | Kayak cross |
| 2026 | 12 June 2026 | Augsburg | 2nd | K1 |
| 2026 | 5 September 2026 | Vaires-sur-Marne | 1st | Kayak cross |
| 2026 | 11 September 2026 | La Seu d'Urgell | 2nd | K1 |

=== Complete World Cup results ===
| Year | WC1 | WC2 | WC3 | WC4 | WC5 | Points | Position |
|---|---|---|---|---|---|---|---|
| 2017 | Prague (Czech Republic); 22 | Augsburg (Germany) | Markkleeberg (Germany); 33 | Ivrea (Italy) | La Seu (Spain) | 23 | 45th |
| 2018 | Liptovský Mikuláš (Slovakia); 25 | Kraków (Poland); 4 | Augsburg (Germany); 12 | Tacen (Slovenia); 15 | La Seu (Spain); 23 | 158 | 12th |
| 2019 | Lee Valley (United Kingdom); 20 | Bratislava (Slovakia); 13 | Tacen (Slovenia); 16 | Markkleeberg (Germany); 10 | Prague (Czech Republic); 21 | 158 | 11th |
| 2020 | Tacen (Slovenia); 2 | Pau (France) | | | | N/A^{[a]} | |
| 2021 | Prague (Czech Republic); 8 | Markkleeberg (Germany); 8 | La Seu (Spain); 20 | Pau (France); 6 | | 183 | 7th |

Notes
^{a} No overall rankings were determined by the ICF, with only two races possible due to the COVID-19 pandemic.
