= Bethan Forrow =

British slalom canoeist

Personal information
- Nationality: British
- Born: 4 May 2001 (age 25) Hatfield, Hertfordshire, England

Sport
- Country: Great Britain
- Sport: Canoe slalom
- Event: C1, K1
- Club: Lee valley paddle Sports Club
Medal record
Women's canoe slalom
Representing Great Britain
World Championships
Gold medal – first place	2018 Rio de Janeiro	C1 team
Bronze medal – third place	2025 Penrith	C1 team
European Championships
Gold medal – first place	2018 Prague	C1 team
U23 World Championships
Gold medal – first place	2021 Tacen	C1
Bronze medal – third place	2022 Ivrea	C1 team
U23 European Championships
Silver medal – second place	2021 Solkan	C1
Bronze medal – third place	2022 České Budějovice	C1 team
Junior World Championships
Silver medal – second place	2018 Ivrea	C1 team
Bronze medal – third place	2019 Kraków	K1 team
Junior European Championships
Bronze medal – third place	2019 Liptovský Mikuláš	C1

Bethan Forrow (born 4 May 2001) is a British slalom canoeist who has competed at the international level since 2016.

She won two medals in the C1 team event at the World Championships with a gold in 2018 and a bronze in 2025. She also won a gold medal in the same event at the 2018 European Championships in Prague.
