= Gabriela Satková =

Czech slalom canoeist (born 2001)

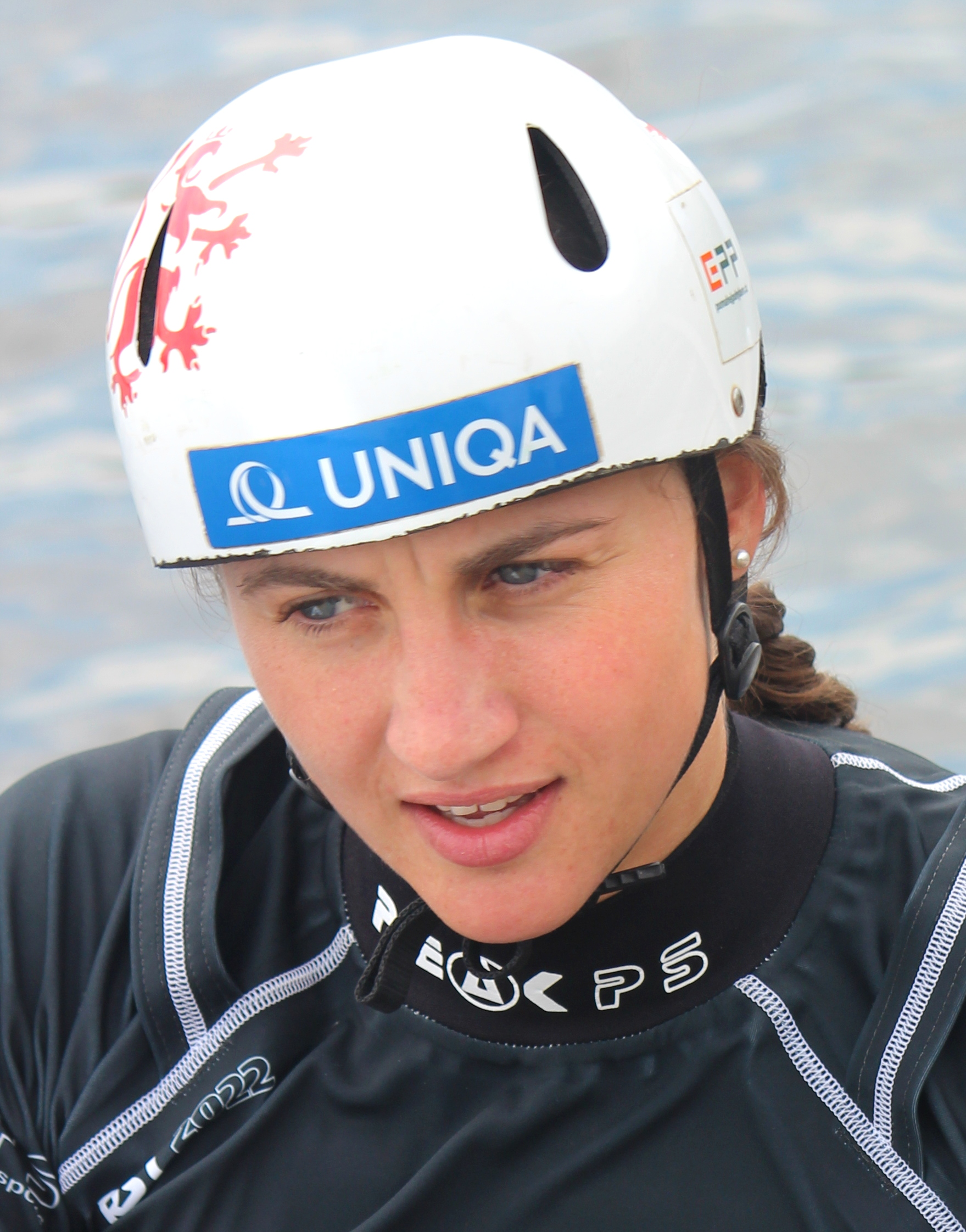
- Gabriela Satková in June 2023

Personal information
- Nationality: Czech
- Born: 2 December 2001 (age 24) Brno, Czech Republic

Sport
- Country: Czech Republic
- Sport: Canoe slalom
- Event: C1, K1
Medal record
Women's canoe slalom
Representing the Czech Republic
World Championships
Gold medal – first place	2021 Bratislava	C1 team
Gold medal – first place	2022 Augsburg	C1 team
Gold medal – first place	2025 Penrith	C1 team
Gold medal – first place	2025 Penrith	K1 team
Silver medal – second place	2018 Rio de Janeiro	C1 team
Silver medal – second place	2023 London	C1 team
Bronze medal – third place	2021 Bratislava	C1
European Games
Gold medal – first place	2023 Kraków	C1 team
European Championships
Gold medal – first place	2020 Prague	C1
Gold medal – first place	2020 Prague	C1 team
Gold medal – first place	2024 Tacen	C1 team
Gold medal – first place	2025 Vaires-sur-Marne	C1 team
Gold medal – first place	2025 Vaires-sur-Marne	K1 team
Silver medal – second place	2024 Tacen	C1
Silver medal – second place	2025 Vaires-sur-Marne	K1
Bronze medal – third place	2022 Liptovský Mikuláš	C1 team
U23 World Championships
Gold medal – first place	2021 Tacen	C1 team
Gold medal – first place	2022 Ivrea	C1 team
Gold medal – first place	2022 Ivrea	K1 team
Gold medal – first place	2023 Kraków	C1 team
Gold medal – first place	2024 Liptovský Mikuláš	C1
Silver medal – second place	2019 Kraków	K1 team
Silver medal – second place	2022 Ivrea	C1
Silver medal – second place	2023 Kraków	K1 team
U23 European Championships
Gold medal – first place	2019 Liptovský Mikuláš	K1 team
Gold medal – first place	2020 Kraków	C1 team
Gold medal – first place	2021 Solkan	C1 team
Gold medal – first place	2022 České Budějovice	C1
Gold medal – first place	2022 České Budějovice	C1 team
Gold medal – first place	2023 Bratislava	C1
Gold medal – first place	2023 Bratislava	C1 team
Silver medal – second place	2020 Kraków	C1
Bronze medal – third place	2016 Solkan	C1 team
Junior World Championships
Gold medal – first place	2018 Ivrea	C1
Gold medal – first place	2018 Ivrea	C1 team
Gold medal – first place	2019 Kraków	C1
Bronze medal – third place	2017 Bratislava	C1 team
Bronze medal – third place	2019 Kraków	C1 team
Junior European Championships
Gold medal – first place	2018 Bratislava	C1 team
Gold medal – first place	2019 Liptovský Mikuláš	C1
Silver medal – second place	2019 Liptovský Mikuláš	C1 team
Bronze medal – third place	2017 Hohenlimburg	C1
Bronze medal – third place	2018 Bratislava	C1

Gabriela Satková (born 2 December 2001) is a former Czech slalom canoeist who competed at the international level from 2016 to 2025.

She won seven medals at the ICF Canoe Slalom World Championships with four golds (C1 team: 2021, 2022, 2025, K1 team: 2025), two silvers (C1 team: 2018, 2023) and a bronze (C1: 2021). She also won nine medals (6 golds, 2 silvers and 1 bronze) at the European Championships, including a gold in the C1 team event at the 2023 European Games in Kraków.

Satková competed at the 2024 Summer Olympics in Paris, finishing 7th in the C1 event.

She announced her retirement from the sport at the beginning of 2026 at the age of 24.

Her older sister Martina is a wildwater and slalom canoeist.

== World Cup individual podiums ==
Season	Date	Venue	Position	Event
2022	28 August 2022	Pau	1st	C1
2022	4 September 2022	La Seu d'Urgell	2nd	C1
2023	10 June 2023	Prague	3rd	C1
2023	7 October 2023	Vaires-sur-Marne	2nd	C1
2024	8 June 2024	Prague	1st	C1
2024	14 September 2024	Ivrea	1st	C1
2024	21 September 2024	La Seu d'Urgell	2nd	C1
2025	14 June 2025	Pau	2nd	C1
