= Martina Satková =

Czech canoeist

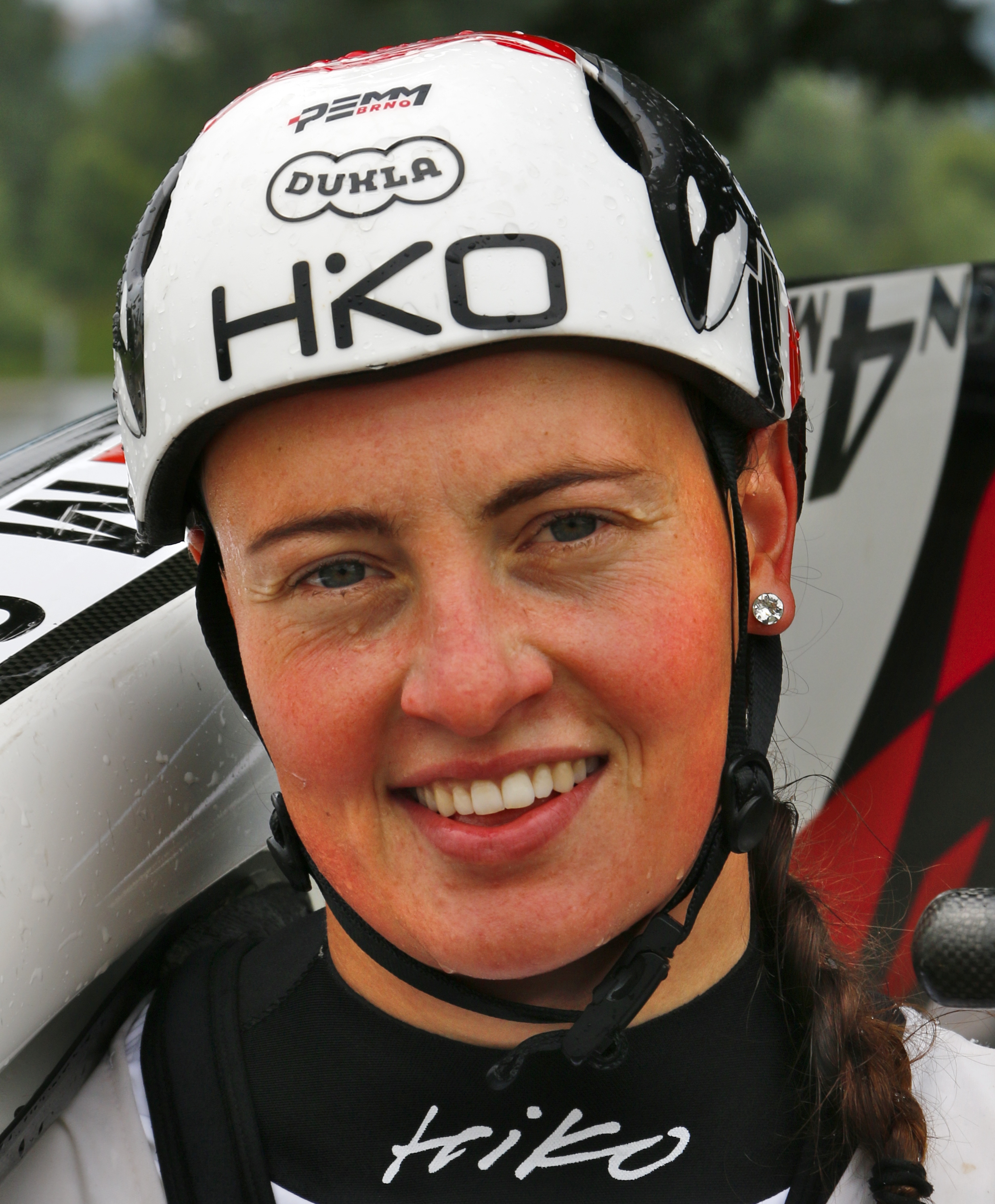
- Satkova in 2024

Personal information
- Nationality: Czech
- Born: 23 August 1998 (age 27) Brno, Czech Republic
- Height: 1.73 m (5 ft 8 in)
- Weight: 66 kg (146 lb)

Sport
- Country: Czech Republic
- Sport: Wildwater canoeing, canoe slalom
- Event: C1, K1, Kayak cross
- Club: Kanoe Klub Spoj Brno
Medal record
Representing the Czech Republic
Wildwater canoeing
Women's canoe slalom
World Championships
Gold medal – first place	2021 Bratislava	C1 team
Gold medal – first place	2022 Augsburg	C1 team
Gold medal – first place	2025 Penrith	C1 team
Silver medal – second place	2026 Oklahoma City	C1 team
European Championships
Gold medal – first place	2024 Tacen	C1 team
Gold medal – first place	2025 Vaires-sur-Marne	C1 team
Silver medal – second place	2016 Liptovský Mikuláš	C1 team
Bronze medal – third place	2022 Liptovský Mikuláš	C1 team
U23 World Championships
Gold medal – first place	2019 Kraków	C1 team
Gold medal – first place	2021 Tacen	C1 team
Silver medal – second place	2021 Tacen	Kayak cross
Bronze medal – third place	2017 Bratislava	C1 team
Bronze medal – third place	2018 Ivrea	C1 team
U23 European Championships
Gold medal – first place	2017 Hohenlimburg	C1 team
Gold medal – first place	2020 Kraków	C1 team
Gold medal – first place	2021 Solkan	C1 team
Silver medal – second place	2019 Liptovský Mikuláš	C1
Silver medal – second place	2019 Liptovský Mikuláš	C1 team
Junior World Championships
Silver medal – second place	2014 Penrith	C1
Junior European Championships
Gold medal – first place	2014 Skopje	C1
Gold medal – first place	2015 Kraków	C1 team
Silver medal – second place	2015 Kraków	K1 team
Silver medal – second place	2016 Solkan	C1 team
Bronze medal – third place	2014 Skopje	C1 team

Martina Satková (born 23 August 1998) is a Czech female wildwater and slalom canoeist who has competed at the international level since 2013.

In canoe slalom she won four medals in the C1 team event at the ICF Canoe Slalom World Championships with three golds (2021, 2022, 2025) and one silver (2026). She also won two golds, a silver and a bronze medal in the same event at the European Championships.

Satková also won 14 medals at senior level at the Wildwater Canoeing World Championships.

Her younger sister Gabriela was also a slalom canoeist.

== World Cup individual podiums ==
Season	Date	Venue	Position	Event
2021	5 September 2021	La Seu d'Urgell	1st	Kayak cross
2022	12 June 2022	Prague	3rd	C1
2022	19 June 2022	Kraków	3rd	C1
2024	15 June 2024	Kraków	3rd	C1
2025	7 June 2025	La Seu d'Urgell	3rd	C1
2026	6 June 2026	Prague	2nd	C1
2026	13 June 2026	Augsburg	3rd	C1

== Medals at the World Wildwater Championships ==
Senior

Year	1st place, gold medalist(s)	2nd place, silver medalist(s)	3rd place, bronze medalist(s)
Wildwater canoeing
2015	2	1	0
2016	2	1	1
2017	1	0	1
2018	1	1	1
2019	2	0	0
