= Tereza Kneblová =

Czech canoeist (born 2003)

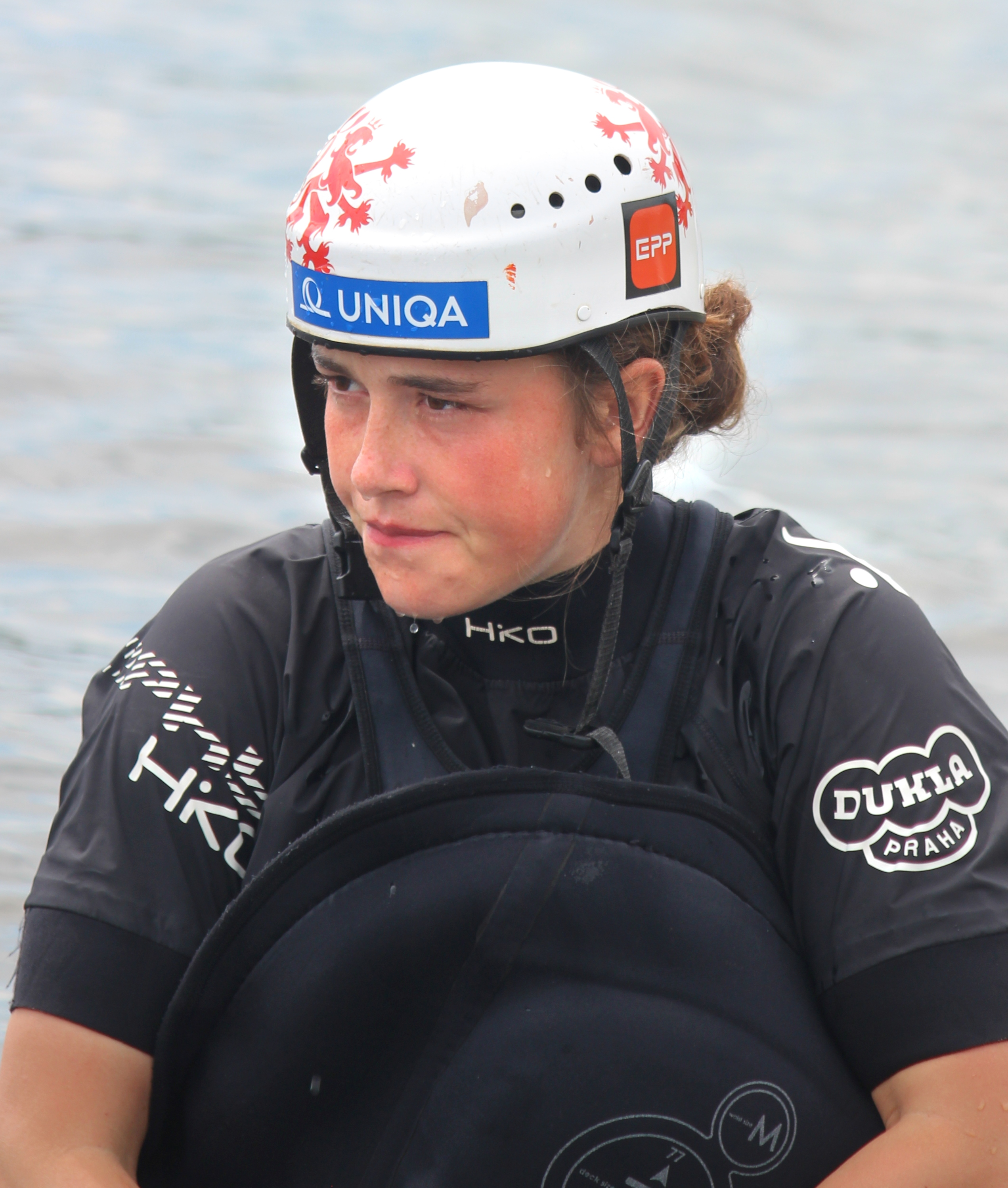
- Tereza Kneblová in 2023

Personal information
- Nationality: Czech
- Born: 11 April 2003 (age 23)

Sport
- Country: Czech Republic
- Sport: Canoe slalom, Wildwater canoeing
- Event: C1, K1, Kayak cross
Medal record
Women's canoe slalom
Representing the Czech Republic
World Championships
Gold medal – first place	2026 Oklahoma City	C1
Silver medal – second place	2023 London	C1 team
Silver medal – second place	2026 Oklahoma City	C1 team
European Games
Gold medal – first place	2023 Kraków	C1 team
European Championships
Gold medal – first place	2026 Ivrea	Kayak cross
Gold medal – first place	2020 Prague	C1 team
Gold medal – first place	2024 Tacen	C1 team
Bronze medal – third place	2026 Ivrea	C1
U23 World Championships
Gold medal – first place	2022 Ivrea	C1 team
Gold medal – first place	2023 Kraków	C1 team
Gold medal – first place	2026 Kraków	Kayak cross
Gold medal – first place	2026 Kraków	Kayak cross individual
Gold medal – first place	2026 Kraków	C1 team
Silver medal – second place	2023 Kraków	C1
Silver medal – second place	2025 Foix	C1 team
Bronze medal – third place	2025 Foix	Kayak cross individual
U23 European Championships
Gold medal – first place	2022 České Budějovice	C1 team
Gold medal – first place	2023 Bratislava	C1 team
Gold medal – first place	2025 Solkan	Kayak cross individual
Gold medal – first place	2025 Solkan	C1 team
Silver medal – second place	2022 České Budějovice	C1
Silver medal – second place	2024 Kraków	C1 team
Bronze medal – third place	2024 Kraków	Kayak cross
Bronze medal – third place	2025 Solkan	Kayak cross
Junior World Championships
Gold medal – first place	2018 Ivrea	C1 team
Gold medal – first place	2019 Kraków	Mixed C2
Gold medal – first place	2021 Tacen	C1 team
Silver medal – second place	2019 Kraków	C1
Silver medal – second place	2021 Tacen	C1
Silver medal – second place	2021 Tacen	K1 team
Bronze medal – third place	2019 Kraków	C1 team
Bronze medal – third place	2021 Tacen	Kayak cross
Junior European Championships
Gold medal – first place	2018 Bratislava	C1 team
Gold medal – first place	2020 Kraków	C1
Gold medal – first place	2020 Kraków	C1 team
Gold medal – first place	2021 Solkan	Kayak cross
Gold medal – first place	2021 Solkan	C1 team
Silver medal – second place	2019 Liptovský Mikuláš	C1 team

Tereza Kneblová (born 11 April 2003) is a Czech female slalom and wildwater canoeist who has competed at the international level since 2018.

She won three medals at the ICF Canoe Slalom World Championships with a gold (C1: 2026) and two silvers (C1 team: 2023, 2026).

She also won five medals (4 golds and 1 bronze) at the European Championships, including a gold in the C1 team event at the 2023 European Games in Kraków.

In wildwater canoeing she finished 4th in the C2 final and 5th in the C1 final at the 2019 Wildwater Canoeing World Championships.

Her younger sister Klára is also a slalom canoeist and multiple medalist in junior championships.

== World Cup individual podiums ==
	1st place, gold medalist(s)	2nd place, silver medalist(s)	3rd place, bronze medalist(s)	Total
C1	1	0	2	3
Kayak cross	2	3	0	5
Kayak cross individual	0	2	0	2
Total	3	5	2	10

Season	Date	Venue	Position	Event
2020	8 November 2020	Pau	3rd	C1
2024	16 June 2024	Kraków	2nd	Kayak cross
2025	8 June 2025	La Seu d'Urgell	2nd	Kayak cross
2025	29 June 2025	Prague	1st	Kayak cross
2026	30 May 2026	Tacen	1st	C1
2026	14 June 2026	Augsburg	2nd	Kayak cross individual
2026	14 June 2026	Augsburg	1st	Kayak cross
2026	10 September 2026	La Seu d'Urgell	2nd	Kayak cross individual
2026	12 September 2026	La Seu d'Urgell	3rd	C1
2026	13 September 2026	La Seu d'Urgell	2nd	Kayak cross

== Wildwater Canoeing ==
Year	Competition	Venue	Rank	Event	Time
2019	World Championships	(Spain) La Seu d'Urgell	5th	C1 sprint	1:07.62
2019	World Championships	(Spain) La Seu d'Urgell	4th	C2 sprint	1:08.87
