= Tereza Fišerová =

Czech canoeist (born 1998)

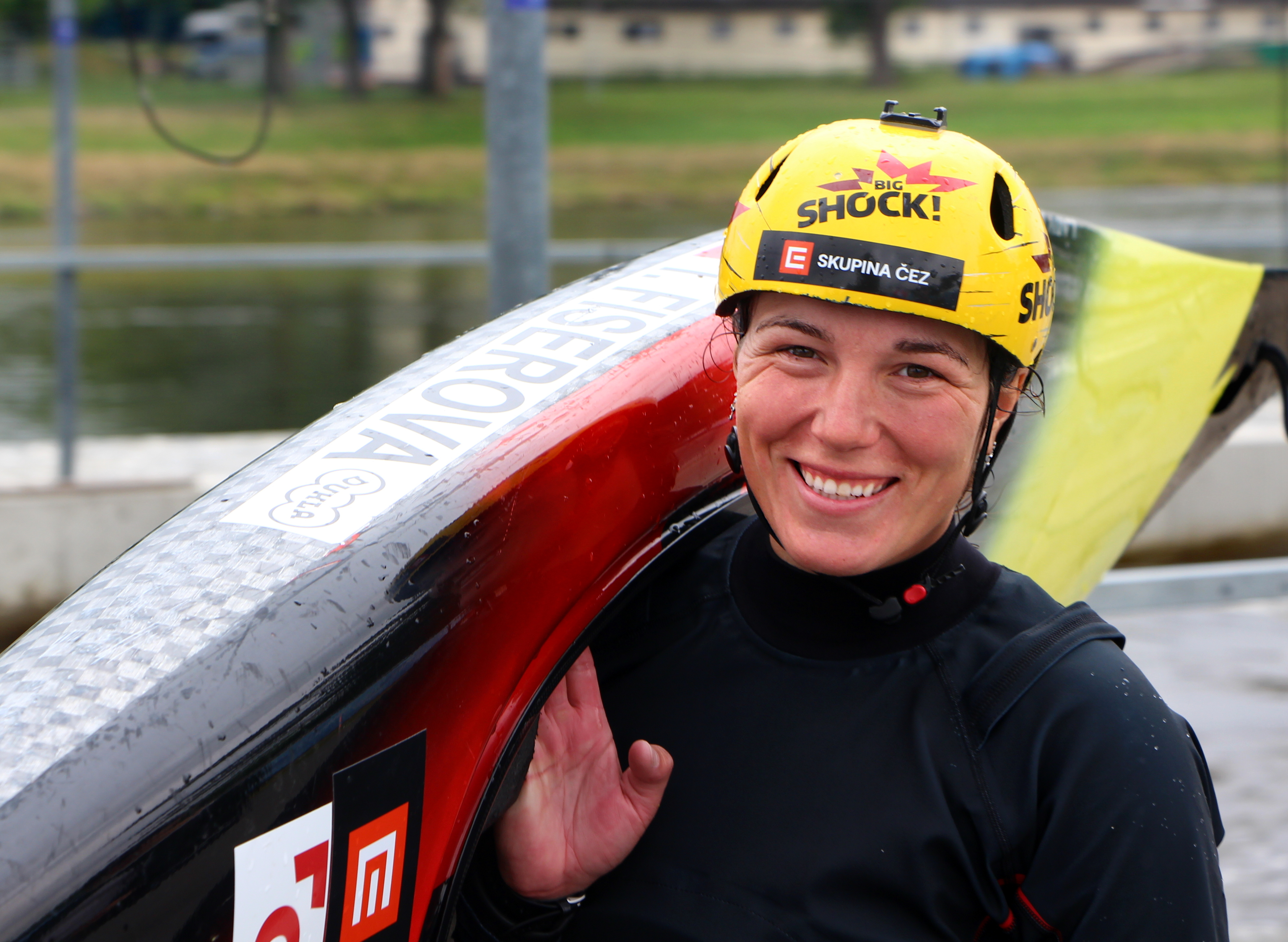

Personal information
- Nationality: Czech
- Born: 23 February 1998 (age 28) Roudnice nad Labem, Czech Republic

Sport
- Country: Czech Republic
- Sport: Canoe slalom
- Event(s): C1, K1, Kayak cross, Mixed C2
- Club: Kanoistika Roudnice
Medal record
Women's canoe slalom
Representing the Czech Republic
World Championships
| Gold medal – first place | 2019 La Seu d'Urgell | Mixed C2 |
| Gold medal – first place | 2021 Bratislava | C1 team |
| Gold medal – first place | 2022 Augsburg | C1 team |
| Silver medal – second place | 2015 London | C1 team |
| Silver medal – second place | 2017 Pau | C1 |
| Silver medal – second place | 2018 Rio de Janeiro | C1 team |
| Silver medal – second place | 2023 London | C1 team |
| Bronze medal – third place | 2017 Pau | C1 team |
| Bronze medal – third place | 2018 Rio de Janeiro | C1 |
| Bronze medal – third place | 2019 La Seu d'Urgell | C1 team |
European Games
| Gold medal – first place | 2023 Kraków | C1 team |
| Silver medal – second place | 2023 Kraków | K1 team |
| Bronze medal – third place | 2023 Kraków | K1 |
European Championships
| Gold medal – first place | 2020 Prague | C1 team |
| Gold medal – first place | 2022 Liptovský Mikuláš | Kayak cross |
| Silver medal – second place | 2015 Markkleeberg | C1 team |
| Silver medal – second place | 2017 Tacen | C1 |
| Silver medal – second place | 2020 Prague | C1 |
| Silver medal – second place | 2021 Ivrea | C1 |
| Bronze medal – third place | 2017 Tacen | C1 team |
| Bronze medal – third place | 2019 Pau | C1 team |
| Bronze medal – third place | 2022 Liptovský Mikuláš | C1 |
| Bronze medal – third place | 2022 Liptovský Mikuláš | C1 team |
| Bronze medal – third place | 2024 Tacen | K1 team |
U23 World Championships
| Gold medal – first place | 2019 Kraków | C1 team |
| Silver medal – second place | 2017 Bratislava | C1 |
| Silver medal – second place | 2019 Kraków | K1 team |
| Bronze medal – third place | 2017 Bratislava | C1 team |
| Bronze medal – third place | 2018 Ivrea | C1 team |
| Bronze medal – third place | 2019 Kraków | Kayak cross |
U23 European Championships
| Gold medal – first place | 2017 Hohenlimburg | C1 team |
| Gold medal – first place | 2019 Liptovský Mikuláš | K1 |
| Gold medal – first place | 2019 Liptovský Mikuláš | K1 team |
| Gold medal – first place | 2020 Kraków | C1 team |
| Gold medal – first place | 2021 Solkan | C1 |
| Gold medal – first place | 2021 Solkan | C1 team |
| Gold medal – first place | 2021 Solkan | Kayak cross |
| Silver medal – second place | 2018 Bratislava | C1 |
| Silver medal – second place | 2019 Liptovský Mikuláš | C1 team |
| Bronze medal – third place | 2019 Liptovský Mikuláš | C1 |
| Bronze medal – third place | 2021 Solkan | K1 |
Junior World Championships
| Gold medal – first place | 2013 Liptovský Mikuláš | K1 team |
| Gold medal – first place | 2014 Penrith | K1 team |
| Gold medal – first place | 2015 Foz do Iguaçu | K1 team |
| Gold medal – first place | 2016 Kraków | C1 |
| Gold medal – first place | 2016 Kraków | K1 team |
Junior European Championships
| Gold medal – first place | 2014 Skopje | K1 team |
| Gold medal – first place | 2015 Kraków | C1 team |
| Gold medal – first place | 2016 Solkan | K1 team |
| Silver medal – second place | 2015 Kraków | K1 team |
| Silver medal – second place | 2016 Solkan | C1 team |
| Bronze medal – third place | 2013 Bourg-Saint-Maurice | K1 team |
| Bronze medal – third place | 2016 Solkan | C1 |

Tereza Fišerová (born 23 February 1998) is a Czech slalom canoeist who has competed at the international level since 2013. Fišerová competes in all canoe slalom disciplines - C1, K1, kayak cross and even mixed C2 before it was discontinued.

She won 10 medals at the ICF Canoe Slalom World Championships with three golds (Mixed C2: 2019, C1 team: 2021, 2022), four silvers (C1: 2017, C1 team: 2015, 2018, 2023) and three bronzes (C1: 2018, C1 team: 2017, 2019).

She also won 14 medals (3 golds, 5 silvers and 6 bronzes) at the European Championships, including a gold, a silver and a bronze at the 2023 European Games in Kraków.

Fišerová won the overall World Cup title in two classes. She won in C1 in 2021 and 2022 and in mixed C2 in 2018 together with Jakub Jáně.

Fišerová competed at the 2020 Summer Olympics in Tokyo, finishing 6th in the C1 event. She also competed at the 2024 Summer Olympics in Paris, finishing 23rd in kayak cross.

== World Cup individual podiums ==
| | 1st place, gold medalist(s) | 2nd place, silver medalist(s) | 3rd place, bronze medalist(s) | Total |
| C1 | 2 | 4 | 4 | 10 |
| K1 | 0 | 1 | 1 | 2 |
| Mixed C2 | 2 | 2 | 0 | 4 |
| Kayak cross | 1 | 1 | 0 | 2 |
| Total | 5 | 8 | 5 | 18 |

| Season | Date | Venue | Position | Event |
|---|---|---|---|---|
| 2017 | 2 September 2017 | Ivrea | 3rd | C1 |
| 2018 | 23 June 2018 | Liptovský Mikuláš | 2nd | Mixed C2 |
| 2018 | 24 June 2018 | Liptovský Mikuláš | 2nd | C1 |
| 2018 | 30 June 2018 | Kraków | 1st | Mixed C2 |
| 2018 | 7 July 2018 | Augsburg | 2nd | Mixed C2 |
| 2018 | 8 September 2018 | La Seu d'Urgell | 1st | Mixed C2 |
| 2019 | 1 September 2019 | Markkleeberg | 2nd | C1 |
| 2019 | 8 September 2019 | Prague | 3rd | C1 |
| 2021 | 13 June 2021 | Prague | 3rd | C1 |
| 2021 | 20 Jun 2021 | Markkleeberg | 2nd | C1 |
| 2021 | 5 September 2021 | La Seu d'Urgell | 2nd | C1 |
| 2021 | 12 September 2021 | Pau | 1st | C1 |
| 2022 | 12 June 2022 | Prague | 1st | C1 |
| 2022 | 12 June 2022 | Prague | 1st | Kayak cross |
| 2022 | 18 June 2022 | Kraków | 2nd | K1 |
| 2022 | 27 August 2022 | Pau | 3rd | K1 |
| 2022 | 4 September 2022 | La Seu d'Urgell | 3rd | C1 |
| 2023 | 11 June 2023 | Prague | 2nd | Kayak cross |
