= 2025 ICF Canoe Slalom World Championships =

Canoe slalom event in Penrith

2025 World Championships
- Venue: Penrith Whitewater Stadium
- Location: Penrith, Australia
- Dates: 29 September to 4 October

The 2025 ICF Canoe Slalom World Championships took place from 29 September to 4 October 2025 in Penrith, Australia under the auspices of International Canoe Federation (ICF). It was the 44th edition and the events were held at the Penrith Whitewater Stadium, the site of the 2000 Summer Olympics. Penrith hosted the championships for the second time after previously hosting in 2005.

232 canoeists from 41 countries participated at the championships.

== Schedule ==
Twelve medal events were contested. Kayak cross individual made its debut as a medal event at the World Championships.

All times listed are UTC+10.

Date	Starting time	Events
29 September	13:33	Men's kayak cross individual
29 September	14:58	Women's kayak cross individual
30 September	10:03	C1M heats
30 September	11:51	C1W heats
30 September	14:38	C1M teams
30 September	15:22	C1W teams
1 October	09:03	K1W heats
1 October	10:40	K1M heats
1 October	14:20	K1W teams
1 October	15:00	K1M teams

Date	Starting time	Events
2 October	10:33	C1M semifinals
2 October	11:38	C1W semifinals
2 October	13:03	C1M final
2 October	13:36	C1W final
3 October	10:33	K1W semifinals
3 October	11:38	K1M semifinals
3 October	14:33	K1W final
3 October	15:17	K1M final
4 October	10:03	Men's and Women's kayak cross

== Medal summary ==
=== Medal table ===
* Host nation (Australia)

Rank	Nation	Gold	Silver	Bronze	Total
1	France	5	2	0	7
2	Czech Republic	2	1	3	6
3	Poland	2	0	1	3
4	Great Britain	1	4	2	7
5	Spain	1	0	0	1
5	Switzerland	1	0	0	1
7	Germany	0	2	0	2
8	Slovenia	0	1	2	3
9	Individual Neutral Athletes	0	1	0	1
9	Japan	0	1	0	1
11	Australia*	0	0	2	2
11	Brazil	0	0	2	2
Totals (12 entries)		12	12	12	36

=== Men ===
==== Canoe ====
Event	Gold		Silver		Bronze	
C1	Nicolas Gestin; France	97.13	Ryan Westley; Great Britain	98.03	Kaylen Bassett; Australia	98.74
C1 team	France; Nicolas Gestin; Mewen Debliquy; Yohann Senechault	99.97	Great Britain; Adam Burgess; Ryan Westley; Luc Royle	100.76	Slovenia; Benjamin Savšek; Luka Božič; Žiga Lin Hočevar	100.86

==== Kayak ====
Event	Gold		Silver		Bronze	
K1	Titouan Castryck; France	90.81	Jakub Krejčí; Czech Republic	92.27	Jiří Prskavec; Czech Republic	92.34
K1 team	France; Titouan Castryck; Benjamin Renia; Anatole Delassus	95.30	Japan; Yusuke Muto; Yuuki Tanaka; Kazuya Adachi	95.36	Great Britain; Ben Haylett; Jonny Dickson; Joseph Clarke	95.40
Kayak cross	Joseph Clarke; Great Britain		Mathurin Madoré; France		Matyáš Novák; Czech Republic	
Kayak cross individual	David Llorente; Spain	55.21	Joseph Clarke; Great Britain	56.33	Jakub Krejčí; Czech Republic	56.89

=== Women ===
==== Canoe ====
Event	Gold		Silver		Bronze	
C1	Klaudia Zwolińska; Poland	108.49	Alsu Minazova; Individual Neutral Athletes	112.88	Ana Sátila; Brazil	112.98
C1 team	Czech Republic; Gabriela Satková; Martina Satková; Adriana Morenová	109.57	Germany; Andrea Herzog; Elena Lilik; Nele Bayn	112.93	Great Britain; Ellis Miller; Kimberley Woods; Bethan Forrow	115.61

==== Kayak ====
Event	Gold		Silver		Bronze	
K1	Klaudia Zwolińska; Poland	100.32	Kimberley Woods; Great Britain	102.09	Kate Eckhardt; Australia	103.84
K1 team	Czech Republic; Gabriela Satková; Lucie Nesnídalová; Antonie Galušková	103.22	Germany; Ricarda Funk; Elena Lilik; Emily Apel	106.48	Slovenia; Eva Alina Hočevar; Ajda Novak; Lea Novak	107.73
Kayak cross	Angèle Hug; France		Camille Prigent; France		Klaudia Zwolińska; Poland	
Kayak cross individual	Alena Marx; Switzerland	62.09	Ajda Novak; Slovenia	63.07	Ana Sátila; Brazil	63.23
