= Ellis Miller =

British slalom canoeist (born 2002)

Personal information
- Born: 2002 (age 23–24)

Sport
- Country: Great Britain
- Sport: Canoe slalom
- Event: C1, K1, Kayak cross
Medal record
Women's canoe slalom
Representing Great Britain
World Championships
Gold medal – first place	2023 London	C1 team
Bronze medal – third place	2025 Penrith	C1 team
European Championships
Bronze medal – third place	2024 Tacen	C1 team
Bronze medal – third place	2026 Ivrea	C1 team
U23 World Championships
Gold medal – first place	2023 Kraków	K1 team
Bronze medal – third place	2022 Ivrea	C1 team
U23 European Championships
Silver medal – second place	2024 Kraków	C1
Bronze medal – third place	2022 České Budějovice	C1 team
Junior World Championships
Silver medal – second place	2018 Ivrea	C1 team
Bronze medal – third place	2019 Kraków	K1 team

Ellis Miller (born 2002) is a British slalom canoeist who has competed at the international level since 2017.

She won two medals in the C1 team event at the World Championships with a gold in 2023 and a bronze in 2025. She also two bronze medals in the C1 team event at the European Championships.
