= Ana Sátila =

Brazilian canoeist (born 1996)

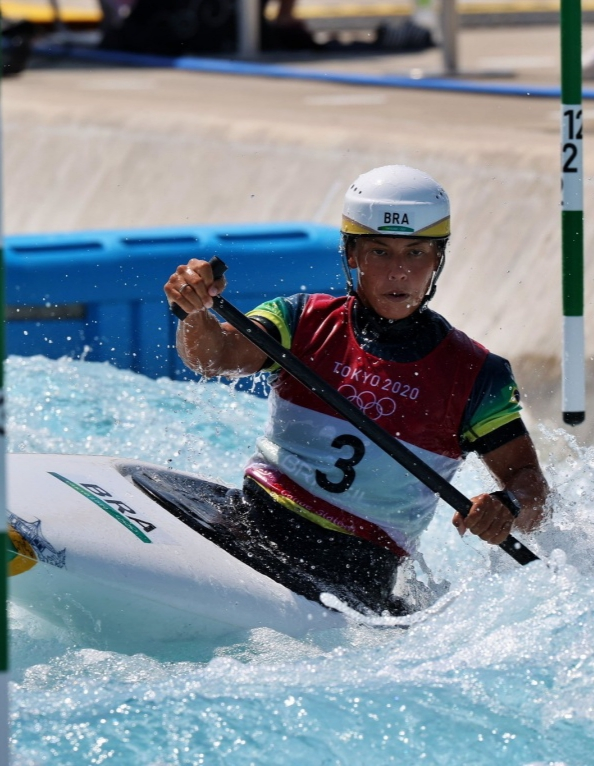

Personal information
- Full name: Ana Sátila Vieira Vargas
- Nationality: Brazilian
- Born: 13 March 1996 (age 30) Iturama, Minas Gerais
- Height: 1.61 m (5 ft 3 in)
- Weight: 59 kg (130 lb)

Sport
- Country: Brazil
- Sport: Canoe slalom
- Event: C1, K1, Kayak cross
- Club: Botafogo de Futebol e Regatas
Medal record
Women's canoe slalom
Representing Brazil
World Championships
Gold medal – first place	2018 Rio de Janeiro	Kayak Cross
Silver medal – second place	2017 Pau	Kayak Cross
Bronze medal – third place	2017 Pau	C1
Bronze medal – third place	2025 Penrith	C1
Bronze medal – third place	2025 Penrith	Kayak cross individual
Pan American Games
Gold medal – first place	2015 Toronto	C1
Gold medal – first place	2019 Lima	C1
Gold medal – first place	2019 Lima	Kayak Cross
Gold medal – first place	2023 Santiago	C1
Gold medal – first place	2023 Santiago	Kayak Cross
Silver medal – second place	2015 Toronto	K1
South American Games
Gold medal – first place	2022 Asunción	C1
Gold medal – first place	2022 Asunción	Kayak Cross
U23 World Championships
Gold medal – first place	2018 Ivrea	Kayak Cross
Gold medal – first place	2019 Kraków	C1
Gold medal – first place	2019 Kraków	Kayak Cross
Silver medal – second place	2015 Foz do Iguaçu	K1
Silver medal – second place	2017 Bratislava	K1
Junior World Championships
Gold medal – first place	2014 Penrith	K1
Bronze medal – third place	2013 Liptovský Mikuláš	C1

Ana Sátila Vieira Vargas (born 13 March 1996) is a Brazilian slalom canoeist who has competed at the international level since 2011.

== Career ==
She began sport training at the age of 4 and qualified for the Olympics at the age of 15.

In 2015, Sátila won two medals at the Pan American Games held in Toronto, Ontario, Canada. She won gold in the C1 event and silver in the K1 event. She would successfully defend her C1 titles at the 2019 Lima and 2023 Santiago editions, while also earning a gold medal at the kayak cross. At the 2015 ICF Canoe Slalom World Championships in London she finished 9th in the C1 event and 13th in the K1 event, after being eliminated in the semifinal.

Satila participated in 4 Olympic Games. At the 2012 Summer Olympics in London, Sátila was the youngest female competitor in canoe slalom. She competed in the K1 event, finishing 16th in the heats, failing to qualify for the semifinals. She finished in 17th place in the K1 event at the 2016 Summer Olympics in Rio de Janeiro. She qualified to represent Brazil at the 2020 Summer Olympics in Tokyo in both women's events. She finished 13th in the K1 event after being eliminated in the semifinal, and at the canoe, where she was number 3 in the world ranking, Ana Sátila became the first Brazilian woman to reach an Olympic final in canoe slalom. In the final of the C1 event, she finished in tenth and last place after getting a time of 164.71 on her run. She first incurred a 2 second penalty at gate 7, and then missed gate 22, which meant another 50 seconds of penalties. Her time would have been enough for 4th place without the 50 second penalty.

Sátila reached the finals in both individual canoe slalom events in the 2024 Summer Olympics in Paris, getting close to medaling in both, with a fourth place in the K1 event and fifth in the C1 event. In the kayak cross, Sátila reached the semifinal, being surpassed by Angèle Hug after a collision in the last gate to end out of the qualifying zone, eventually finishing eighth overall following the B final.

Sátila won five medals at the ICF Canoe Slalom World Championships with a gold (Kayak cross: 2018), a silver (Kayak cross: 2017) and three bronzes (C1: 2017, 2025, Kayak cross individual: 2025).

By September 2026, Sátila had also won 19 medals in World Cup events since 2015, including five golds.

== World Cup individual podiums ==
	1st place, gold medalist(s)	2nd place, silver medalist(s)	3rd place, bronze medalist(s)	Total
C1	3	2	4	9
K1	0	2	1	3
Kayak cross	2	3	2	7
Total	5	7	7	19

Season	Date	Venue	Position	Event
2015	20 June 2015	Prague	3rd	C1
2016	3 September 2016	Prague	3rd	Kayak Cross
2016	4 September 2016	Prague	2nd	K1
2018	24 June 2018	Liptovský Mikuláš	2nd	Kayak cross
2018	1 July 2018	Kraków	3rd	C1
2018	8 July 2018	Augsburg	3rd	C1
2018	8 July 2018	Augsburg	1st	Kayak cross
2018	30 September 2018	Rio de Janeiro	1st	Kayak cross^{1}
2019	23 June 2019	Bratislava	3rd	C1
2019	7 September 2019	Prague	2nd	K1
2020	18 October 2020	Tacen	1st	C1
2020	8 November 2020	Pau	1st	C1
2021	5 September 2021	La Seu d'Urgell	3rd	Kayak cross
2021	12 September 2021	Pau	2nd	Kayak cross
2023	4 June 2023	Augsburg	2nd	Kayak cross
2024	31 May 2024	Augsburg	3rd	K1
2024	15 June 2024	Kraków	2nd	C1
2025	6 September 2025	Augsburg	2nd	C1
2026	12 September 2026	La Seu d'Urgell	1st	C1

^{1} World Championship counting for World Cup points

== Personal life ==
Ana Sátila is the elder sister of Omira Estácia Neta, another Brazilian canoeist. She is engaged to rower Lucas Verthein.
