= Nele Bayn =

German slalom canoeist

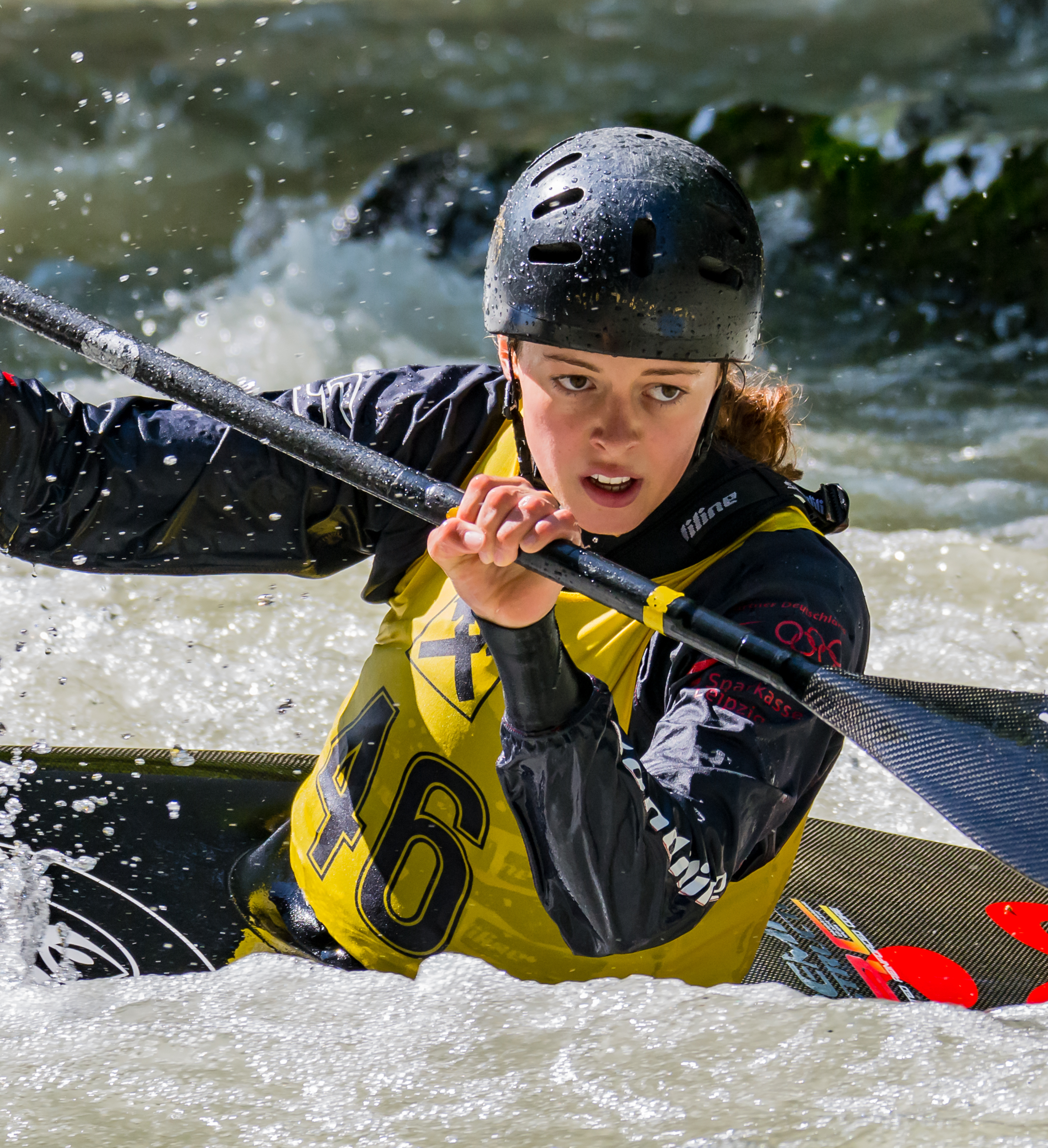

Personal information
- Nationality: German
- Born: 6 January 2000 (age 26)

Sport
- Country: Germany
- Sport: Canoe slalom
- Event: C1
Medal record
Women's canoe slalom
Representing Germany
World Championships
Silver medal – second place	2022 Augsburg	C1 team
Silver medal – second place	2025 Penrith	C1 team
European Games
Bronze medal – third place	2023 Kraków	C1 team
Junior European Championships
Silver medal – second place	2017 Hohenlimburg	C1 team
Bronze medal – third place	2018 Bratislava	C1 team

Nele Bayn (born 6 January 2000) is a German slalom canoeist who has competed at the international level since 2017.

She won two silver medals in the C1 team event at the World Championships (2022, 2025). She also won a bronze medal in the same event at the 2023 European Games in Kraków.
