= Lea Novak =

Slovenian slalom canoeist

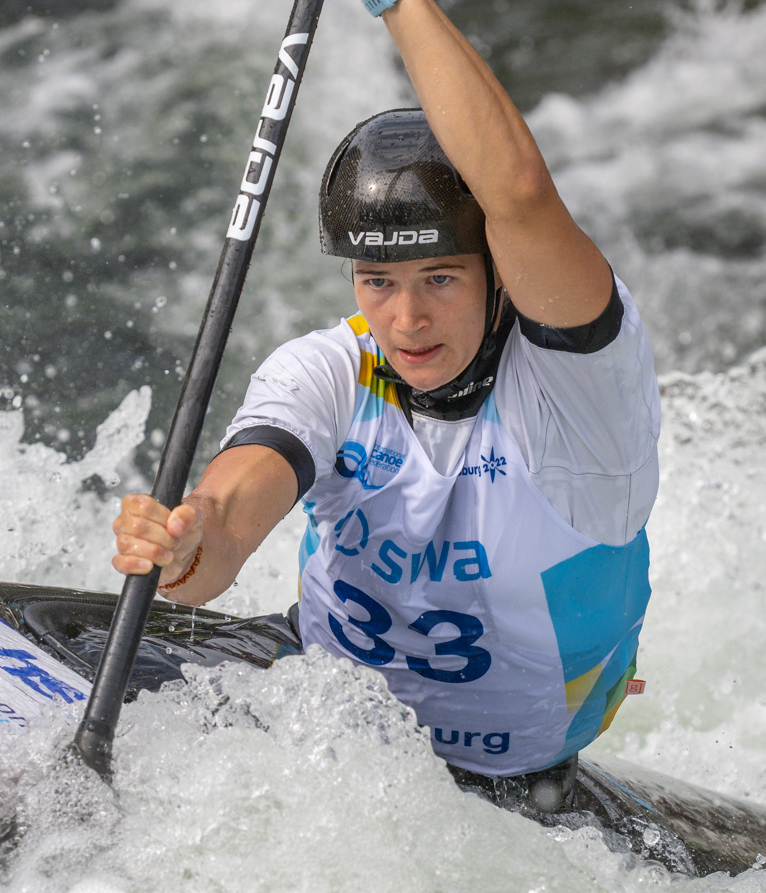

Personal information
- Nationality: Slovenian
- Born: 2000 (age 25–26)

Sport
- Country: Slovenia
- Sport: Canoe slalom
- Event: C1, K1, Kayak cross
Medal record
Women's canoe slalom
Representing Slovenia
World Championships
Bronze medal – third place	2023 London	C1 team
Bronze medal – third place	2025 Penrith	K1 team
European Championships
Silver medal – second place	2020 Prague	C1 team
Silver medal – second place	2024 Tacen	C1 team
U23 World Championships
Silver medal – second place	2018 Ivrea	C1 team
Bronze medal – third place	2023 Kraków	K1 team
U23 European Championships
Silver medal – second place	2017 Hohenlimburg	C1 team
Bronze medal – third place	2023 Bratislava	K1
Bronze medal – third place	2023 Bratislava	K1 team
Junior World Championships
Silver medal – second place	2018 Ivrea	K1 team

Lea Novak (born 2000) is a Slovenian slalom canoeist who has competed at the international level since 2016.

She won two bronze medals at the World Championships (C1 team: 2023, K1 team: 2025). She also won two silver medals in the C1 team event at the European Championships.
