= Eva Alina Hočevar =

Slovenian slalom canoeist

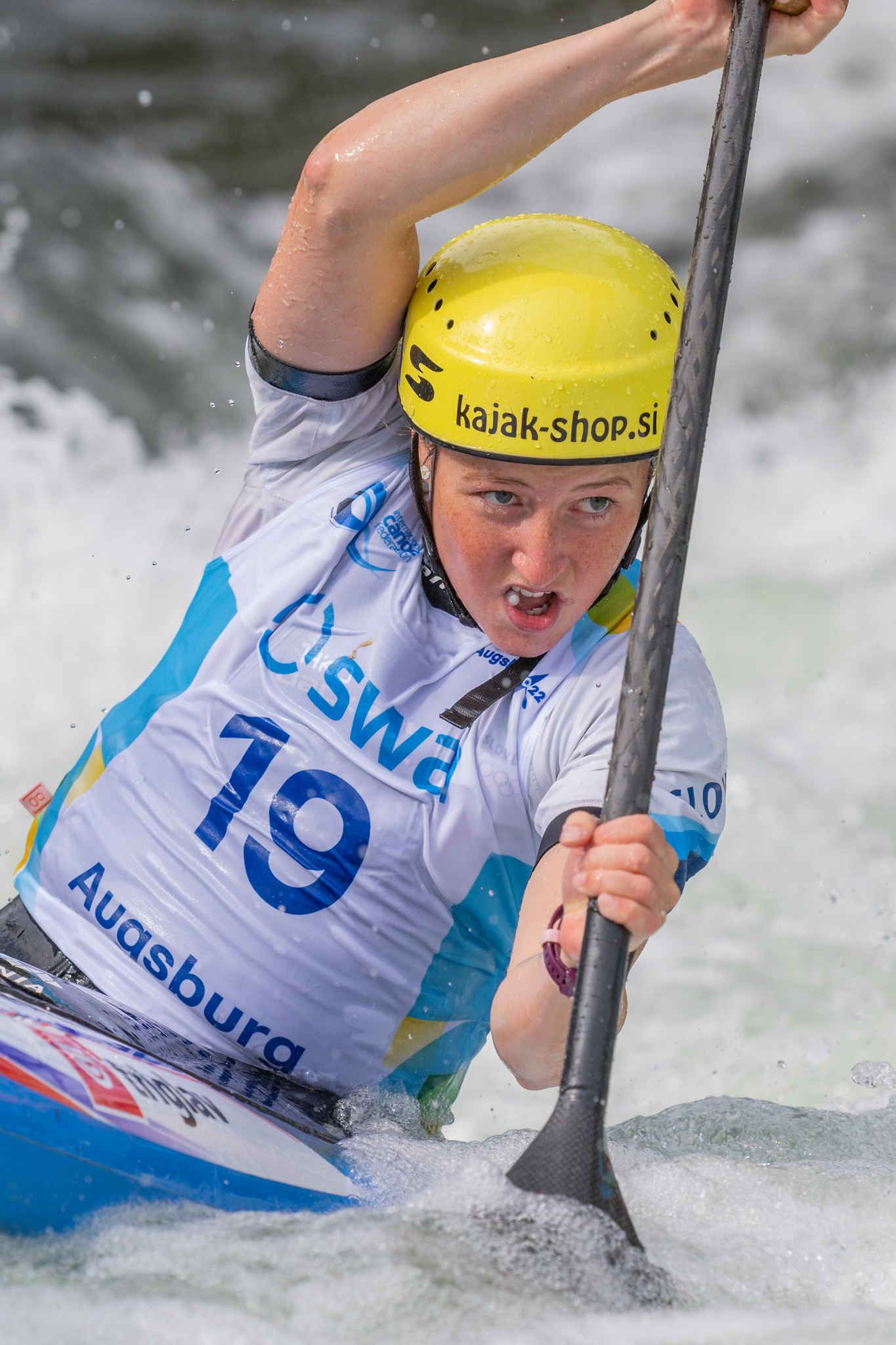
- Hočevar in 2022

Personal information
- Nationality: Slovenian
- Born: 27 March 2002 (age 24)
- Height: 161 cm (5 ft 3 in)

Sport
- Country: Slovenia
- Sport: Canoe slalom
- Event: C1, K1, Kayak cross
Medal record
Women's canoe slalom
Representing Slovenia
World Championships
Silver medal – second place	2022 Augsburg	K1 team
Bronze medal – third place	2023 London	C1 team
Bronze medal – third place	2025 Penrith	K1 team
European Championships
Gold medal – first place	2024 Tacen	K1 team
Silver medal – second place	2020 Prague	C1 team
Silver medal – second place	2024 Tacen	C1 team
U23 World Championships
Gold medal – first place	2025 Foix	K1
Silver medal – second place	2018 Ivrea	C1 team
Silver medal – second place	2024 Liptovský Mikuláš	K1
Bronze medal – third place	2023 Kraków	K1 team
Bronze medal – third place	2024 Liptovský Mikuláš	C1
Bronze medal – third place	2025 Foix	C1
U23 European Championships
Gold medal – first place	2022 České Budějovice	Kayak cross
Gold medal – first place	2024 Kraków	C1
Gold medal – first place	2025 Solkan	C1
Gold medal – first place	2025 Solkan	K1
Silver medal – second place	2025 Solkan	Kayak cross
Bronze medal – third place	2023 Bratislava	K1 team
Bronze medal – third place	2024 Kraków	K1
Bronze medal – third place	2025 Solkan	Kayak cross individual
Junior World Championships
Gold medal – first place	2018 Ivrea	K1
Silver medal – second place	2018 Ivrea	K1 team
Silver medal – second place	2019 Kraków	K1
Junior European Championships
Silver medal – second place	2018 Bratislava	K1
Silver medal – second place	2020 Kraków	K1 team

Eva Alina Hočevar (born 27 March 2002) is a Slovenian slalom canoeist who has competed internationally since 2017.

She won three medals at the ICF Canoe Slalom World Championships with one silver (K1 team: 2022) and two bronzes (C1 team: 2023, K1 team: 2025). She also won three medals (1 gold and 2 silvers) at the European Championships.

Hočevar competed at the 2024 Summer Olympics in Paris, finishing 9th in the C1 event and 29th in kayak cross.

She is the overall World Cup champion in C1 from 2026.

Her father Simon Hočevar and younger brother Žiga Lin Hočevar are also successful slalom canoeists.

== World Cup individual podiums ==
Season	Date	Venue	Position	Event
2023	16 June 2023	Tacen	3rd	C1
2025	8 June 2025	La Seu d'Urgell	3rd	Kayak cross individual
2025	28 June 2025	Prague	2nd	C1
2025	29 August 2025	Tacen	2nd	K1
2025	31 August 2025	Tacen	2nd	Kayak cross individual
2026	29 May 2026	Tacen	1st	K1
2026	30 May 2026	Tacen	2nd	C1
2026	4 September 2026	Vaires-sur-Marne	2nd	C1
