= Noemie Fox =

Australian slalom canoeist

Noemie Fox OAM
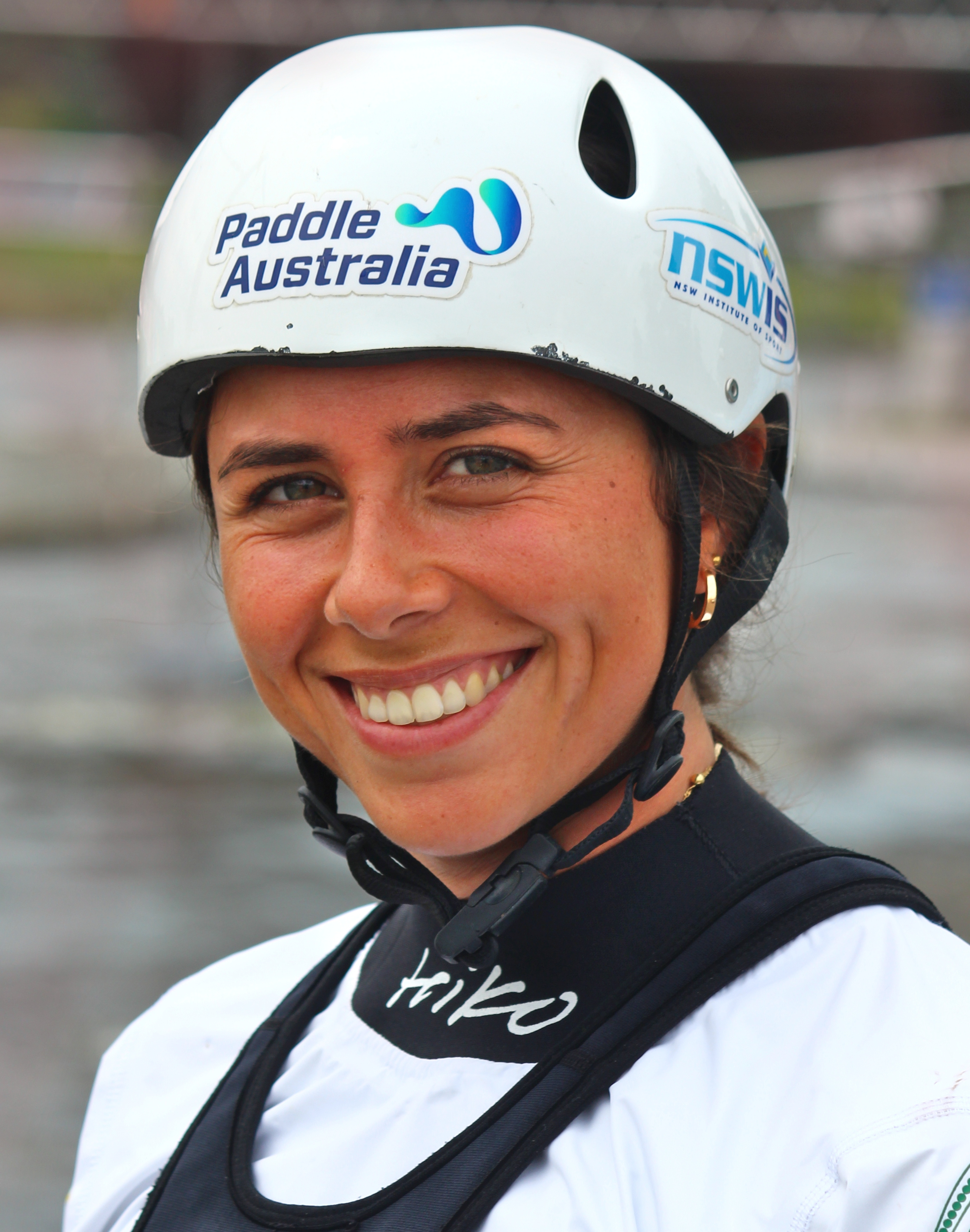
- Fox in 2023 in Prague

Personal information
- Full name: Noémie Fox
- Nationality: Australian, French
- Born: 19 March 1997 (age 29) Marseille, France

Sport
- Country: Australia
- Sport: Canoe slalom
- Event: C1, K1, Kayak cross
- Club: Penrith Valley Canoeing
Medal record
Women's canoe slalom
Representing Australia
Olympic Games
Gold medal – first place	2024 Paris	Kayak cross
World Championships
Gold medal – first place	2019 La Seu d'Urgell	C1 team
Gold medal – first place	2023 London	K1 team
Gold medal – first place	2026 Oklahoma City	K1 team
Silver medal – second place	2017 Pau	C1 team
Silver medal – second place	2026 Oklahoma City	Kayak cross
Oceania Championships
Gold medal – first place	2025 Penrith	Kayak cross
Silver medal – second place	2025 Penrith	C1
Silver medal – second place	2025 Penrith	K1
U23 World Championships
Bronze medal – third place	2016 Kraków	C1 team
Bronze medal – third place	2017 Bratislava	K1 team
Bronze medal – third place	2018 Ivrea	C1
Bronze medal – third place	2019 Kraków	C1 team
Junior World Championships
Gold medal – first place	2013 Liptovský Mikuláš	C1 team
Bronze medal – third place	2015 Foz do Iguaçu	K1 team

Noémie Fox OAM (born 19 March 1997) is a French-born Australian slalom canoeist who has competed at the international level since 2013, winning two world championships. Fox won the gold medal at the 2024 Paris Olympics in the kayak cross, becoming the first-ever Olympic champion in that event.

== Early life ==
Fox was born in France, and is Jewish. She comes from a canoe slalom family, with her father being former world champion Richard Fox, her mother and coach Myriam Fox-Jerusalmi (who won the K1 bronze medal in the Atlanta Olympic Games in 1996), her aunt Rachel Crosbee (world championship silver medalist), and her older sister Olympic and world champion Jessica Fox.

== Career ==
She won five medals at the ICF Canoe Slalom World Championships with three golds (C1 team: 2019, K1 team: 2023, 2026) and two silvers (Kayak cross: 2026, C1 team: 2017).

=== 2024 Summer Olympics ===
Fox won the gold medal at the 2024 Paris Olympics, in the kayak cross event, becoming the first-ever Olympic champion in that event, at the National Olympic Nautical Stadium of Île-de-France in Vaires-sur-Marne.

Fox has the distinction of winning every one of her races. She finished 8th in the time trial. In Round 1, she won the race ahead of Viktoriia Us, Maialen Chourraut and Lois Betteridge. In the heats she was alongside Martina Wegman, Chourraut and her sister Jessica Fox. Noemie won the heat while Jessica was eliminated. In the quarterfinals, Fox was with Luuka Jones, Ricarda Funk and once again Chourraut. In the semifinals Fox defeated Elena Lilik, Carole Bouzidi and Jones and then in the final she finished ahead of Angèle Hug, Kimberley Woods and Lilik.

Fox's victory meant she and Jessica joined the exclusive club of siblings who have won individual gold at the same Olympics. Others to have done it include Japanese judokas, Hifumi Abe and sister Uta Abe.

=== World Cup individual podiums ===
Season	Date	Venue	Position	Event
2016	11 Jun 2016	La Seu d'Urgell	3rd	C1
2022	19 June 2022	Kraków	2nd	Kayak cross
2024	9 June 2024	Prague	2nd	Kayak cross^{1}
2024	15 September 2024	Ivrea	3rd	Kayak cross

^{1} 2024 Olympic qualifier. Did not count for World Cup rankings.

== See also ==
- List of select Jewish canoeists
- List of Jewish Olympic medalists
- List of ICF Canoe Slalom World Championships medalists in women's canoe
- List of ICF Canoe Slalom World Championships medalists in women's kayak
