= 2026 ICF Canoe Slalom World Championships – Men's kayak cross individual =

Men's kayak cross individual at the 2026 ICF Canoe Slalom World Championships
- Venue: RIVERSPORT OKC
- Location: Oklahoma City, Oklahoma, United States
- Dates: 20 July 2026
- Competitors: 77 from 40 nations

Medalists
gold medal	Joseph Clarke	Great Britain
silver medal	Jakub Krejčí	Czech Republic
bronze medal	David Llorente	Spain

The men's kayak cross individual event at the 2026 ICF Canoe Slalom World Championships took place on 20 July 2026 at the RIVERSPORT OKC in Oklahoma City.

== Competition format ==
The kayak cross individual time trial event is a single run competition which also serves as the qualification for the kayak cross event where 4 paddlers race each other head-to-head. Top 42 paddlers from the kayak cross individual time trial advanced to the knockout phase at these championships.

Paddlers start their run by sliding off the starting platform several meters above the water. Then they must navigate the downstream and upstream gates. Unlike in classic slalom, paddlers are allowed to touch the gates and even intentionally move them with their paddle, but not with a free hand. There is also a designated zone where paddlers must perform an Eskimo roll.

Athletes can be penalized by receiving a fault (FLT). Faults are incurred for false starts, missing gates or failing to correctly perform the Eskimo roll. Athletes are ranked according to the time they achieve, with those incurring faults ranked at the bottom.

== Results ==
Top 42 qualified for the kayak cross event.

Rank	Bib	Athlete	Nation	Time	Notes
1st place, gold medalist(s)	1	Joseph Clarke	Great Britain	46.54	Q
2nd place, silver medalist(s)	8	Jakub Krejčí	Czech Republic	46.70	Q
3rd place, bronze medalist(s)	13	David Llorente	Spain	46.98	Q
4	4	Matyáš Novák	Czech Republic	47.12	Q
5	26	Felix Oschmautz	Austria	47.25	Q
6	15	Merle Long	Australia	47.62	Q
7	25	Alex Baldoni	Canada	47.79	Q
8	24	Vít Přindiš	Czech Republic	47.83	Q
9	9	Sam Leaver	Great Britain	47.87	Q
10	12	Giovanni De Gennaro	Italy	47.94	Q
11	6	Manuel Ochoa	Spain	47.99	Q
12	23	Gabriel De Coster	Belgium	48.08	Q
13	3	Mathurin Madoré	France	48.33	Q
14	16	Jan Rohrer	Switzerland	48.66	Q
15	21	Nicholas Collier	New Zealand	48.76	Q
16	27	Hu Zhaoshan	China	48.88	Q
17	11	Martin Dougoud	Switzerland	48.96	Q
18	2	Finn Butcher	New Zealand	49.03	Q
19	55	Yuuki Tanaka	Japan	49.13	Q
20	30	Joris Hello	France	49.15	Q
21	28	Quan Xin	China	49.25	Q
22	19	Dimitri Marx	Switzerland	49.27	Q
23	31	Mario Leitner	Austria	49.33	Q
24	7	Pedro Gonçalves	Brazil	49.34	Q
25	17	Benjamin Renia	France	49.35	Q
26	22	Stefan Hengst	Germany	49.40	Q
27	32	Pau Echaniz	Spain	49.42	Q
28	5	Mateusz Polaczyk	Poland	49.44	Q
29	41	Ben Haylett	Great Britain	49.45	Q
30	14	Timothy Anderson	Australia	49.62	Q
31	43	Ivan Kozlov	Individual Neutral Athletes	49.94	Q
32	29	Xabier Ferrazzi	Italy	50.04	Q
33	39	Serhii Sovko	Ukraine	50.09	Q
34	33	Isaac Zimmerman	Canada	50.13	Q
35	47	Martin Halčin	Slovakia	50.24	Q
36	40	Jesús Martínez	Chile	50.29	Q
37	50	Marek Kulczycki	Poland	50.39	Q
38	48	Pavel Eigel	Uzbekistan	50.49	Q
39	34	Michal Smolen	United States	50.50	Q
40	42	Felix Sachers	Germany	50.53	Q
41	57	Thomas Ukalovic	Croatia	50.54	Q
42	37	Dávid Skubík	Slovakia	50.60	Q
43	20	Lucien Delfour	Australia	51.18	
44	60	Weng Jize	China	51.24	
45	35	Mark Zielonka	Canada	51.88	
46	54	Max Steinbrenner	Austria	52.65	
47	18	Andraz Echeverría Olguín	Chile	52.87	
48	62	Yusuke Muto	Japan	53.09	
49	74	Kazuya Adachi	Japan	53.14	
50	67	Ben Brown	Ireland	53.17	
51	38	Marten Konrad	Germany	53.20	
52	58	Mārtiņš Plaudis	Latvia	53.20	
53	44	Manuel Trípano	Argentina	53.51	
54	51	Alexandr Korobov	Kazakhstan	53.78	
55	69	Matthew Van Heerden	South Africa	53.93	
56	59	Tyler Westfall	United States	54.34	
57	49	Terence Saramandif	Mauritius	54.39	
58	66	Liao Li-hong	Chinese Taipei	54.56	
59	53	Kauã da Silva	Brazil	55.64	
60	75	Eren Yalkin	Turkey	56.62	
61	56	Finn Anderson	New Zealand	58.34	
62	68	Chu Hung-yu	Chinese Taipei	59.25	
63	76	Mustafa Parlak	Turkey	60.47	
64	61	Raage Magan	Djibouti	62.16	
65	72	Wu Jung-cheng	Chinese Taipei	63.00	
66	63	Pradhyumna Singh Rathod	India	63.38	
67	70	Arno Reblin	Kenya	64.21	
68	73	Ng Wee Meng	Singapore	72.00	
69	64	Juan Antonio Carrasco Cadillo	Peru	64.64	FLT (3)
70	10	Žiga Lin Hočevar	Slovenia	49.55	FLT (2)
71	36	Kaelin Friedenson	United States	51.40	FLT (2)
72	46	Michał Pasiut	Poland	49.24	FLT (S)
73	45	Egor Smirnov	Individual Neutral Athletes	RAL	
74	77	Baek Seo-jin	South Korea	DNF	
75	52	Noel Hendrick	Ireland	DSQ	
	71	Youssouf Wally Ndiaye	Senegal	DNS	
	65	Kevin Alfonso Vega Perez	Venezuela	DNS	
