= 2026 ICF Canoe Slalom World Championships – Men's K1 =

Men's kayak at the 2026 ICF Canoe Slalom World Championships
- Venue: RIVERSPORT OKC
- Location: Oklahoma City, United States
- Dates: 21–23 July 2026
- Competitors: 80 from 40 nations

Medalists
gold medal	Jakub Krejčí	Czech Republic
silver medal	Michał Pasiut	Poland
bronze medal	Giovanni De Gennaro	Italy

The men's kayak event at the 2026 ICF Canoe Slalom World Championships took place on 23 July 2026 at the RIVERSPORT OKC in Oklahoma City, with the qualification heats on 21 July 2026.

== Competition format ==
The event uses a three-round format with qualification heats, semifinal and final. The top 30 paddlers from the single qualification run qualify for the semifinal. Paddlers start in the reverse order of their qualification position in the semifinal and complete a single run, with the top 12 advancing to the final. The start list for the final is once again in reverse order of the semifinal results. The athlete with the best time in the single-run final is awarded gold.

A penalty of 2 seconds is awarded for touching a gate and a 50-second penalty is awarded for missing a gate or negotiating it in the opposite direction.

The qualification course had 22 gates including 6 upstream gates (5-7-11-14-17-20). The semifinal and final course also had 22 gates with 6 upstream gates (5-7-11-14-17-22).

== Schedule ==
All times listed are UTC–5.

Date	Time	Round
21 July 2026
21 July 2026	10:44	Heats
23 July 2026
23 July 2026	11:11	Semifinal
23 July 2026	14:45	Final

== Results ==
Penalties are included in the time shown. The fastest time in each round is shown in bold.

Rank	Bib	Canoeist	Nation	Heats			Semifinal			Final		
Rank	Bib	Canoeist	Nation	Time	Pen	Rank	Time	Pen	Rank	Time	Pen	Rank
1st place, gold medalist(s)	4	Jakub Krejčí	Czech Republic	**80.02**	0	1	84.80	0	2	**83.65**	0	1
2nd place, silver medalist(s)	26	Michał Pasiut	Poland	83.76	2	26	85.38	0	3	84.34	0	2
3rd place, bronze medalist(s)	3	Giovanni De Gennaro	Italy	81.57	0	9	86.78	2	5	85.27	0	3
4	19	Sam Leaver	Great Britain	81.24	0	7	88.64	2	11	86.25	2	4
5	13	Martin Dougoud	Switzerland	82.12	0	10	86.67	2	4	87.37	0	5
6	16	Miquel Travé	Spain	83.32	0	20	86.96	2	6	87.45	2	6
7	17	Mario Leitner	Austria	82.54	0	13	87.83	0	8	87.66	0	7
8	23	Gabriel De Coster	Belgium	83.52	0	22	87.88	2	9	88.22	0	8
9	34	Dariusz Popiela	Poland	82.65	0	14	88.54	0	10	89.69	0	9
10	18	Pau Echaniz	Spain	83.80	2	27	87.36	0	7	90.02	0	10
11	11	Joseph Clarke	Great Britain	82.93	0	17	**84.78**	0	1	136.27	52	11
12	14	Timothy Anderson	Australia	81.51	0	8	88.86	2	12	136.37	50	12
13	8	Lucien Delfour	Australia	83.12	0	18	89.35	0	13	did not advance		
14	5	Jiří Prskavec	Czech Republic	82.14	0	11	89.45	0	14	did not advance		
15	20	Lan Tominc	Slovenia	82.33	0	12	90.74	2	15	did not advance		
16	39	Pavel Eigel	Uzbekistan	83.58	0	24	91.52	0	16	did not advance		
17	47	Kazuya Adachi	Japan	83.32	0	20	95.18	2	17	did not advance		
18	31	Stefan Hengst	Germany	83.68	2	25	96.40	0	18	did not advance		
19	41	Christian Stanzel	Germany	83.57	0	23	102.14	6	19	did not advance		
20	30	Quan Xin	China	84.35	0	28	103.96	4	20	did not advance		
21	21	Martin Cornu	France	83.26	0	19	104.13	2	21	did not advance		
22	28	Vít Přindiš	Czech Republic	80.93	2	5	106.55	4	22	did not advance		
23	10	Noah Hegge	Germany	80.16	0	2	135.64	50	23	did not advance		
24	15	Felix Oschmautz	Austria	84.47	0	29	137.67	50	24	did not advance		
25	25	Benjamin Pope	Australia	84.59	0	30	138.19	50	25	did not advance		
26	7	Xabier Ferrazzi	Italy	80.27	0	3	139.36	52	26	did not advance		
27	6	Mateusz Polaczyk	Poland	80.49	0	4	139.62	54	27	did not advance		
28	9	Peter Kauzer	Slovenia	82.67	0	15	152.34	52	28	did not advance		
29	24	Ben Haylett	Great Britain	80.98	0	6	158.98	52	29	did not advance		
30	1	Titouan Castryck	France	82.79	2	16	189.94	102	30	did not advance		
31	2	Anatole Delassus	France	84.73	0	31	did not advance					
32	46	Frederico Alvarenga	Portugal	84.81	0	32	did not advance					
33	27	David Llorente	Spain	85.07	2	33	did not advance					
34	29	Gelindo Chiarello	Switzerland	85.15	0	34	did not advance					
35	53	Dávid Skubík	Slovakia	85.30	0	35	did not advance					
36	12	Finn Butcher	New Zealand	85.32	0	36	did not advance					
37	37	Pedro Gonçalves	Brazil	85.33	4	37	did not advance					
38	44	Michal Smolen	United States	85.39	2	38	did not advance					
39	43	Mathis Soudi	Morocco	85.46	0	39	did not advance					
40	38	Ivan Kozlov	Individual Neutral Athletes	85.84	0	40	did not advance					
41	42	Thomas Ukalovic	Croatia	86.04	0	41	did not advance					
42	58	Tyler Westfall	United States	86.35	2	42	did not advance					
43	36	Yusuke Muto	Japan	86.53	4	43	did not advance					
44	33	Martin Halčin	Slovakia	86.57	2	44	did not advance					
45	50	Reilly Vernon	Ireland	86.59	0	45	did not advance					
46	52	Alex Baldoni	Canada	87.10	2	46	did not advance					
47	57	Hu Zhaoshan	China	87.36	2	47	did not advance					
48	32	Jan Rohrer	Switzerland	88.14	2	48	did not advance					
49	45	Kaelin Friedenson	United States	88.34	2	49	did not advance					
49	75	Ben Brown	Ireland	88.34	2	49	did not advance					
51	55	Serhii Sovko	Ukraine	88.89	0	51	did not advance					
52	48	Noel Hendrick	Ireland	88.92	2	52	did not advance					
53	35	Egor Smirnov	Individual Neutral Athletes	89.04	6	53	did not advance					
54	54	Manuel Trípano	Argentina	89.30	2	54	did not advance					
54	59	George Snook	New Zealand	89.30	2	54	did not advance					
56	49	Lucas Jacob	Portugal	89.48	2	56	did not advance					
57	51	Max Steinbrenner	Austria	90.12	2	57	did not advance					
58	68	Chu Hung-yu	Chinese Taipei	90.48	0	58	did not advance					
59	62	Liao Li-hong	Chinese Taipei	90.80	0	59	did not advance					
60	67	Alexandr Korobov	Kazakhstan	91.13	2	60	did not advance					
61	65	Michal Smiesko	Canada	91.41	2	61	did not advance					
62	61	Teppei Saito	Japan	92.29	2	62	did not advance					
63	69	Weng Jize	China	93.14	4	63	did not advance					
64	63	Maël Rivard	Canada	94.54	2	64	did not advance					
65	64	Jesús Martínez	Chile	95.69	4	65	did not advance					
66	56	João Cunha	Portugal	96.34	4	66	did not advance					
67	60	Andraz Echeverría Olguín	Chile	96.74	6	67	did not advance					
68	76	Matthew van Heerden	South Africa	103.12	2	68	did not advance					
69	72	Geral Soto	Chile	106.67	6	69	did not advance					
70	77	Baek Seo-jin	South Korea	113.26	10	70	did not advance					
71	71	Raage Magan	Djibouti	115.56	8	71	did not advance					
72	78	Arno Reblin	Kenya	117.90	0	72	did not advance					
73	70	Pradhyumna Singh Rathod	India	120.01	4	73	did not advance					
74	73	Juan Antonio Carrasco Cadillo	Peru	123.57	2	74	did not advance					
75	40	Adam Gonšenica	Slovakia	136.40	52	75	did not advance					
76	22	Martin Srabotnik	Slovenia	136.91	50	76	did not advance					
77	80	Dimitrios Zachos	Greece	146.71	50	77	did not advance					
78	79	Youssouf Wally Ndiaye	Senegal	171.19	8	78	did not advance					
79	74	Eren Yalkin	Turkey	184.88	100	79	did not advance					
80	66	Mārtiņš Plaudis	Latvia	192.94	102	80	did not advance					
