= 2026 ICF Canoe Slalom World Championships – Men's kayak cross =

Men's kayak cross at the 2026 ICF Canoe Slalom World Championships
- Venue: RIVERSPORT OKC
- Location: Oklahoma City, United States
- Dates: 20–25 July 2026
- Competitors: 77 from 40 nations

Medalists
gold medal	Vít Přindiš	Czech Republic
silver medal	Dimitri Marx	Switzerland
bronze medal	Sam Leaver	Great Britain

The men's kayak cross event at the 2026 ICF Canoe Slalom World Championships took place on 25 July 2026 at the RIVERSPORT OKC in Oklahoma City, with the qualification time trial on 20 July 2026.

== Competition format ==
The kayak cross event is split into two phases – qualification time trials and knockout phase where 3 or 4 paddlers race each other head-to-head. Top 42 paddlers from the individual time trial (which is a medal event in itself) advance to the knockout phase.

Paddlers start their run by sliding off the starting platform several meters above the water. Then they must navigate the downstream and upstream gates. Unlike in classic slalom, paddlers are allowed to touch the gates and even intentionally move them with their paddle, but not with a free hand. There is also a designated zone where paddlers must perform an Eskimo roll.

Athletes can be penalized in three ways in each round, by receiving a fault (FLT) or by being ranked as lower (RAL). Faults are incurred for false starts, missing gates or failing to correctly perform the Eskimo roll. Athletes are ranked as lower (RAL) if they breach the safety requirements of the competition, such as by holding back another athlete with their hands or paddle, deliberately paddling over another athlete's boat, or by making dangerous contact with another athlete's head or body - all other non-dangerous contact is allowed. In each round athletes are ranked first by the order in which they cross the finish line, with those incurring penalties ranked in the following order: FLT, RAL, DNF, DNS.

The final classification of athletes is determined in the following manner: Athletes eliminated at any phase of the competition will be given their rank based on the comparison of the qualification times of athletes eliminated at the same phase. All 3rd ranked athletes will be ranked above all 4th ranked athletes.

== Schedule ==
All times listed are UTC–5.

Date	Time	Round
20 July 2026	09:34	Time trial
25 July 2026
25 July 2026	10:40	Round 1
25 July 2026	11:41	Repechage round
25 July 2026	14:04	Heats
25 July 2026	15:23	Quarterfinals
25 July 2026	15:53	Semifinals
25 July 2026	16:13	Small final
25 July 2026	16:27	Final

== Results ==
=== Time trial ===
- 2026 ICF Canoe Slalom World Championships – Men's kayak cross individual

=== Round 1 ===
Top 2 from each race advance to the heats. The rest go to repechage.

Proceed to heats
Proceed to repechage

Race 1
Rank	Bib	Athlete	Country	Notes
1	1	Joseph Clarke	Great Britain	
2	12	Gabriel De Coster	Belgium	
3	33	Serhii Sovko	Ukraine	

Race 2
Rank	Bib	Athlete	Country	Notes
1	13	Mathurin Madoré	France	
2	2	Jakub Krejčí	Czech Republic	
3	32	Xabier Ferrazzi	Italy	FLT (S)

Race 3
Rank	Bib	Athlete	Country	Notes
1	42	Dávid Skubík	Slovakia	
2	14	Jan Rohrer	Switzerland	
3	3	David Llorente	Spain	
4	31	Ivan Kozlov	Individual Neutral Athletes	

Race 4
Rank	Bib	Athlete	Country	Notes
1	4	Matyáš Novák	Czech Republic	
2	30	Timothy Anderson	Australia	
3	41	Thomas Ukalovic	Croatia	FLT (6)
4	15	Nicholas Collier	New Zealand	FLT (2)

Race 5
Rank	Bib	Athlete	Country	Notes
1	5	Felix Oschmautz	Austria	
2	29	Ben Haylett	Great Britain	
3	40	Felix Sachers	Germany	
4	16	Hu Zhaoshan	China	

Race 6
Rank	Bib	Athlete	Country	Notes
1	6	Merle Long	Australia	
2	39	Michal Smolen	United States	FLT (3)
3	28	Mateusz Polaczyk	Poland	FLT (3)
4	17	Martin Dougoud	Switzerland	FLT (1)

Race 7
Rank	Bib	Athlete	Country	Notes
1	18	Finn Butcher	New Zealand	
2	7	Alex Baldoni	Canada	
3	38	Pavel Eigel	Uzbekistan	FLT (5)
4	27	Pau Echaniz	Spain	FLT (S)

Race 8
Rank	Bib	Athlete	Country	Notes
1	8	Vít Přindiš	Czech Republic	
2	26	Stefan Hengst	Germany	
3	19	Yuuki Tanaka	Japan	
4	37	Marek Kulczycki	Poland	FLT (S, 3)

Race 9
Rank	Bib	Athlete	Country	Notes
1	20	Joris Hello	France	
2	9	Sam Leaver	Great Britain	
3	36	Jesús Martínez	Chile	
4	25	Benjamin Renia	France	

Race 10
Rank	Bib	Athlete	Country	Notes
1	10	Giovanni De Gennaro	Italy	
2	35	Martin Halčin	Slovakia	
3	21	Quan Xin	China	
4	24	Pedro Gonçalves	Brazil	FLT (6)

Race 11
Rank	Bib	Athlete	Country	Notes
1	11	Manuel Ochoa	Spain	
2	23	Mario Leitner	Austria	
3	22	Dimitri Marx	Switzerland	
4	34	Isaac Zimmerman	Canada	

=== Repechage ===
Top 2 from each race advance to the heats. The rest are eliminated.

Proceed to heats
Eliminated

Race 1
Rank	Bib	Athlete	Country	Notes
1	34	Isaac Zimmerman	Canada	
2	41	Thomas Ukalovic	Croatia	FLT (6)
3	3	David Llorente	Spain	FLT (3)
4	21	Quan Xin	China	FLT (2, R)

Race 2
Rank	Bib	Athlete	Country	Notes
1	22	Dimitri Marx	Switzerland	
2	40	Felix Sachers	Germany	
3	33	Serhii Sovko	Ukraine	
4	15	Nicholas Collier	New Zealand	RAL

Race 3
Rank	Bib	Athlete	Country	Notes
1	32	Xabier Ferrazzi	Italy	
2	16	Hu Zhaoshan	China	
3	38	Pavel Eigel	Uzbekistan	
4	24	Pedro Gonçalves	Brazil	FLT (2)

Race 4
Rank	Bib	Athlete	Country	Notes
1	17	Martin Dougoud	Switzerland	
2	37	Marek Kulczycki	Poland	
3	25	Benjamin Renia	France	
4	31	Ivan Kozlov	Individual Neutral Athletes	

Race 5
Rank	Bib	Athlete	Country	Notes
1	27	Pau Echaniz	Spain	
2	28	Mateusz Polaczyk	Poland	
3	36	Jesús Martínez	Chile	
4	19	Yuuki Tanaka	Japan	FLT (3, 6)

=== Heats ===
Top 2 from each race advance to the quarterfinals. The rest are eliminated.

Proceed to quarterfinals
Eliminated

Race 1
Rank	Bib	Athlete	Country	Notes
1	1	Joseph Clarke	Great Britain	
2	16	Jan Rohrer	Switzerland	
3	17	Mario Leitner	Austria	
4	32	Thomas Ukalovic	Croatia	

Race 2
Rank	Bib	Athlete	Country	Notes
1	24	Dimitri Marx	Switzerland	
2	8	Mathurin Madoré	France	
3	9	Finn Butcher	New Zealand	
4	25	Pau Echaniz	Spain	

Race 3
Rank	Bib	Athlete	Country	Notes
1	5	Vít Přindiš	Czech Republic	
2	12	Jakub Krejčí	Czech Republic	
3	21	Martin Halčin	Slovakia	
4	28	Hu Zhaoshan	China	

Race 4
Rank	Bib	Athlete	Country	Notes
1	4	Merle Long	Australia	
2	13	Alex Baldoni	Canada	
3	29	Mateusz Polaczyk	Poland	
4	20	Timothy Anderson	Australia	FLT (2)

Race 5
Rank	Bib	Athlete	Country	Notes
1	14	Sam Leaver	Great Britain	
2	3	Felix Oschmautz	Austria	
3	30	Marek Kulczycki	Poland	
4	19	Ben Haylett	Great Britain	

Race 6
Rank	Bib	Athlete	Country	Notes
1	6	Giovanni De Gennaro	Italy	
2	22	Michal Smolen	United States	
3	11	Dávid Skubík	Slovakia	FLT (3)
4	27	Isaac Zimmerman	Canada	FLT (2)

Race 7
Rank	Bib	Athlete	Country	Notes
1	10	Joris Hello	France	
2	23	Martin Dougoud	Switzerland	
3	26	Xabier Ferrazzi	Italy	
4	7	Manuel Ochoa	Spain	

Race 8
Rank	Bib	Athlete	Country	Notes
1	15	Gabriel De Coster	Belgium	
2	2	Matyáš Novák	Czech Republic	
3	18	Stefan Hengst	Germany	
4	31	Felix Sachers	Germany	

=== Quarterfinals ===
Top 2 from each race advance to the semifinals. The rest are eliminated.

Proceed to semifinals
Eliminated

Race 1
Rank	Bib	Athlete	Country	Notes
1	1	Joseph Clarke	Great Britain	
2	24	Dimitri Marx	Switzerland	
3	16	Jan Rohrer	Switzerland	FLT (6)
4	8	Mathurin Madoré	France	FLT (2)

Race 2
Rank	Bib	Athlete	Country	Notes
1	4	Merle Long	Australia	
2	5	Vít Přindiš	Czech Republic	
3	12	Jakub Krejčí	Czech Republic	FLT (6)
4	13	Alex Baldoni	Canada	FLT (5)

Race 3
Rank	Bib	Athlete	Country	Notes
1	14	Sam Leaver	Great Britain	
2	3	Felix Oschmautz	Austria	
3	6	Giovanni De Gennaro	Italy	
4	22	Michal Smolen	United States	FLT (3)

Race 4
Rank	Bib	Athlete	Country	Notes
1	15	Gabriel De Coster	Belgium	
2	23	Martin Dougoud	Switzerland	
3	10	Joris Hello	France	
4	2	Matyáš Novák	Czech Republic	FLT (S)

=== Semifinals ===
Top 2 from each race advance to the final. The rest go to the small final.

Proceed to final
Proceed to small final

Race 1
Rank	Bib	Athlete	Country	Notes
1	24	Dimitri Marx	Switzerland	
2	5	Vít Přindiš	Czech Republic	
3	1	Joseph Clarke	Great Britain	
4	4	Merle Long	Australia	FLT (3)

Race 2
Rank	Bib	Athlete	Country	Notes
1	14	Sam Leaver	Great Britain	
2	15	Gabriel De Coster	Belgium	
3	23	Martin Dougoud	Switzerland	
4	3	Felix Oschmautz	Austria	

=== Small final ===
Rank	Bib	Athlete	Country	Notes
1	1	Joseph Clarke	Great Britain	
2	4	Merle Long	Australia	
3	23	Martin Dougoud	Switzerland	
4	3	Felix Oschmautz	Austria	

=== Final ===
Rank	Bib	Athlete	Country	Notes
1st place, gold medalist(s)	5	Vít Přindiš	Czech Republic	
2nd place, silver medalist(s)	24	Dimitri Marx	Switzerland	
3rd place, bronze medalist(s)	14	Sam Leaver	Great Britain	
4	15	Gabriel De Coster	Belgium	

=== Final ranking (Top 42) ===
The top 42 ranking determined by the knockout rounds.

Rank	Athlete	Country	Heat rank
1st place, gold medalist(s)	Vít Přindiš	Czech Republic	1
2nd place, silver medalist(s)	Dimitri Marx	Switzerland	2
3rd place, bronze medalist(s)	Sam Leaver	Great Britain	3
4	Gabriel De Coster	Belgium	4
5	Joseph Clarke	Great Britain	1
6	Merle Long	Australia	2
7	Martin Dougoud	Switzerland	3
8	Felix Oschmautz	Austria	4
9	Giovanni De Gennaro	Italy	QF3 (3)
10	Joris Hello	France	QF4 (3)
11	Jakub Krejčí	Czech Republic	QF2 (3)
12	Jan Rohrer	Switzerland	QF1 (3)
13	Matyáš Novák	Czech Republic	QF4 (4)
14	Mathurin Madoré	France	QF1 (4)
15	Alex Baldoni	Canada	QF2 (4)
16	Michal Smolen	United States	QF3 (4)
17	Finn Butcher	New Zealand	H2 (3)
18	Dávid Skubík	Slovakia	H6 (3)
19	Mario Leitner	Austria	H1 (3)
20	Stefan Hengst	Germany	H8 (3)
21	Martin Halčin	Slovakia	H3 (3)
22	Xabier Ferrazzi	Italy	H7 (3)
23	Mateusz Polaczyk	Poland	H4 (3)
24	Marek Kulczycki	Poland	H5 (3)
25	Manuel Ochoa	Spain	H7 (4)
26	Ben Haylett	Great Britain	H5 (4)
27	Timothy Anderson	Australia	H4 (4)
28	Pau Echaniz	Spain	H2 (4)
29	Isaac Zimmerman	Canada	H6 (4)
30	Hu Zhaoshan	China	H3 (4)
31	Felix Sachers	Germany	H8 (4)
32	Thomas Ukalovic	Croatia	H1 (4)
33	David Llorente	Spain	RE (3)
34	Benjamin Renia	France	RE (3)
35	Serhii Sovko	Ukraine	RE (3)
36	Jesús Martínez	Chile	RE (3)
37	Pavel Eigel	Uzbekistan	RE (3)
38	Nicholas Collier	New Zealand	RE (RAL)
39	Yuuki Tanaka	Japan	RE (4)
40	Quan Xin	China	RE (4)
41	Pedro Gonçalves	Brazil	RE (4)
42	Ivan Kozlov	Individual Neutral Athletes	RE (4)
