= ICF Canoe Slalom World Rankings =

Canoe slalom official rankings

The ICF Canoe Slalom World Rankings are the performance-based rankings of canoe slalom athletes competing in the official International Canoe Federation (ICF) Ranking Series of events. It is used to determine the starting order for qualification at international events, most notably World Cups and World Championships, across all current Olympic disciplines, with athletes starting in the reverse order of their ICF Canoe Slalom Ranking. The rankings are updated quarterly but were frozen from December 2019 to September 2021 due to the ongoing COVID-19 pandemic.

== Ranking method ==
Rankings are determined by an athlete's average score across their 5 best results in the 2 year period directly beforehand. The athlete with the lowest average score will be ranked number 1 in their respective discipline (C1M, C1W, K1M, K1W, C2M or C2Mx). An athlete who has competed in less than 5 ICF events will be ranked below all athletes who have completed five or more events, regardless of their average score.

ICF points are calculated for each stage of competition (Heats, Semi finals and Finals), with an athlete's lowest score across the three stages contributing towards their average. The earlier stages are offset by 20 and 10 points respectively so that qualifying first in the heats stage or winning the semi-final are not equivalent to winning the final.

Additionally, scores are offset by a "quality factor" added to an athlete's score at a given event in order to accommodate for the varying levels of competition across the ICF Ranking Series of events. World Cups, World Championships and the Olympic Games are prescribed a quality factor of zero, whilst less competitive events may be prescribed a quality factor of over 100. The lowest quality factor outside of the major events is typically the Australian Open, which is prescribed a quality factor of approximately 2 (varying year to year).

Within these rules, an athlete may achieve an average score of 0 if they win five of the 12 races that hold a quality factor of zero across a 2 year period (5 World Cups and a World Championships or Olympic Games each year).

== Current rankings ==
Below are the current ICF Canoe Slalom World Rankings, correct as of the end of 2023 season. Movement is shown relative to the rankings from the previous quarter. A † denotes the current Olympic champion, the reigning world champion is shown in bold and the overall world cup winner is in italics.

=== Canoe men ===
#	Athlete	Average Score	Movement
1	**Benjamin Savšek** (SLO)	0.94	▲1
2	Nicolas Gestin (FRA) †	2.33	▲1
3	Luka Božič (SLO)	2.42	▼2
4	Žiga Lin Hočevar (SLO)	3.11	▲1
5	Miquel Travé (ESP)	3.31	▼1
6	Raffaello Ivaldi (ITA)	3.32	▲1
7	Jiří Prskavec (CZE)	3.84	▲1
8	Matej Beňuš (SVK)	4.42	▼2
9	Ryan Westley (GBR)	4.46	Steady
10	Marko Mirgorodský (SVK)	5.85	▲2
11	Adam Burgess (GBR)	6.78	Steady
12	Sideris Tasiadis (GER)	6.80	▼2
13	Paolo Ceccon (ITA)	7.46	▲1
14	Václav Chaloupka (CZE)	7.68	▼1
15	Yohann Senechault (FRA)	7.94	▲ ?
16	Jules Bernadet (FRA)	8.03	▲2
17	Lukáš Rohan (CZE)	8.52	▼1
18	Martino Barzon (ITA)	10.05	▲4
19	Timo Trummer (GER)	10.76	Steady
20	Tristan Carter (AUS)	11.00	▲1

=== Kayak men ===
#	Athlete	Average Score	Movement
1	Giovanni De Gennaro (ITA) †	0.59	▲1
2	Jiří Prskavec (CZE)	0.66	▼1
3	**Joseph Clarke** (GBR)	1.59	▲1
4	Titouan Castryck (FRA)	2.02	▲3
5	Peter Kauzer (SLO)	2.87	Steady
6	Anatole Delassus (FRA)	3.40	▲3
7	Vít Přindiš (CZE)	3.43	▼4
8	Martin Dougoud (SUI)	3.96	▼2
9	Felix Oschmautz (AUT)	5.59	▼1
10	Jakub Krejčí (CZE)	6.40	Steady
11	Timothy Anderson (AUS)	6.77	▲3
12	Lucien Delfour (AUS)	7.11	▼1
13	Žiga Lin Hočevar (SLO)	8.35	▲9
14	Mateusz Polaczyk (POL)	8.58	▲10
15	Hannes Aigner (GER)	8.75	Steady
16	Lan Tominc (SLO)	9.44	▲ ?
17	Pau Echaniz (ESP)	9.71	▲13
18	Jonny Dickson (GBR)	10.50	▼1
19	Xabier Ferrazzi (ITA)	10.07	▲10
20	Noah Hegge (GER)	10.99	▲3

=== Canoe women ===
#	Athlete	Average Score	Movement
1	Jessica Fox (AUS) †	0.00	Steady
2	Gabriela Satková (CZE)	1.69	▲1
3	Elena Lilik (GER)	4.28	▲1
4	Kimberley Woods (GBR)	4.66	▲2
5	Andrea Herzog (GER)	5.67	▼3
6	**Mallory Franklin** (GBR)	6.48	▼1
7	Mònica Dòria Vilarrubla (AND)	8.04	▲1
8	Ana Sátila (BRA)	8.92	▲2
9	Zuzana Paňková (SVK)	9.80	▼2
10	Marjorie Delassus (FRA)	10.43	▼1
11	Angèle Hug (FRA)	10.50	▲1
12	Eva Alina Hočevar (SLO)	11.48	▲5
13	Viktoriia Us (UKR)	11.50	▲3
14	Evy Leibfarth (USA)	11.85	▼1
15	Klaudia Zwolińska (POL)	11.98	▼1
16	Núria Vilarrubla (ESP)	12.15	▲4
17	Tereza Kneblová (CZE)	13.52	▲2
18	Noemie Fox (AUS)	13.69	Steady
19	Marta Bertoncelli (ITA)	13.92	▼4
20	Martina Satková (CZE)	15.19	▲2

=== Kayak women ===
#	Athlete	Average Score	Movement
1	**Jessica Fox** (AUS) †	0.00	Steady
2	Ricarda Funk (GER)	1.82	Steady
3	Klaudia Zwolińska (POL)	3.39	▲2
4	Elena Lilik (GER)	3.74	▼1
5	Stefanie Horn (ITA)	4.03	▲1
6	Eva Terčelj (SLO)	4.49	▲1
7	Camille Prigent (FRA)	6.42	▼3
8	Maialen Chourraut (ESP)	7.08	Steady
9	Corinna Kuhnle (AUT)	7.27	Steady
10	Ana Sátila (BRA)	7.79	▲4
11	Eliška Mintálová (SVK)	8.46	Steady
12	Kimberley Woods (GBR)	8.51	▼2
13	Emma Vuitton (FRA)	9.37	▲4
14	Luuka Jones (NZL)	9.62	▲1
15	Mònica Dòria Vilarrubla (AND)	9.92	▼2
16	Martina Wegman (NED)	10.39	▼4
17	Evy Leibfarth (USA)	11.20	▲2
18	Mallory Franklin (GBR)	13.31	▼2
19	Antonie Galušková (CZE)	13.57	▲8
20	Viktoriia Us (UKR)	13.67	▲4

== Year-end No. 1 ranked athletes ==
=== Canoe ===
Season	C1 men	C1 women	C2 men	C2 mixed
2007	Michal Martikán (SVK) (0)	-	Pavol Hochschorner/Peter Hochschorner (SVK) (0)	-
2008	Michal Martikán (SVK) (0)	-	Pavol Hochschorner/Peter Hochschorner (SVK) (0)	-
2009	Tony Estanguet (FRA) (0)	Rosalyn Lawrence (AUS) (5.26)	Pavol Hochschorner/Peter Hochschorner (SVK) (0)	-
2010	Tony Estanguet (FRA) (0)	Cen Nanqin (CHN) (0)	Pavol Hochschorner/Peter Hochschorner (SVK) (0)	-
2011	Denis Gargaud Chanut (FRA) (0.89)	Jessica Fox (AUS) (0)	Pavol Hochschorner/Peter Hochschorner (SVK) (0)	-
2012	David Florence (GBR) (0.02)	Rosalyn Lawrence (AUS) (0)	Pavol Hochschorner/Peter Hochschorner (SVK) (0)	-
2013	David Florence (GBR) (0.75)	Jessica Fox (AUS) (0)	Pierre Labarelle/Nicolas Peschier (FRA) (0.72)	-
2014	David Florence (GBR) (0.99)	Jessica Fox (AUS) (0)	Gauthier Klauss/Matthieu Péché (FRA) (0.44)	-
2015	Benjamin Savšek (SLO) (1.36)	Jessica Fox (AUS) (0)	Gauthier Klauss/Matthieu Péché (FRA) (0.53)	-
2016	Matej Beňuš (SVK) (1.09)	Jessica Fox (AUS) (0)	Gauthier Klauss/Matthieu Péché (FRA) (1.02)	-
2017	Alexander Slafkovský (SVK) (0.59)	Jessica Fox (AUS) (0)	Ladislav Škantár/Peter Škantár (SVK) (0.02)	Tereza Fišerová/Jakub Jáně (CZE) (5.06)
2018^{[a]}	Sideris Tasiadis (GER) (0)	Jessica Fox (AUS) (0)	Robert Behling/Thomas Becker (GER) (0.82)	Tereza Fišerová/Jakub Jáně (CZE) (0.89)
2019^{[b]}	Sideris Tasiadis (GER) (0.56)	Jessica Fox (AUS) (0)	Filip Brzeziński/ Andrzej Brzeziński (POL) (20.68)	Tereza Fišerová/Jakub Jáně (CZE) (0.89)
2020^{[c]}	Sideris Tasiadis (GER) (0.56)	Jessica Fox (AUS) (0)	Filip Brzeziński/ Andrzej Brzeziński (POL) (20.68)	Tereza Fišerová/Jakub Jáně (CZE) (0.89)
2021	Alexander Slafkovský (SVK) (0.51)	Jessica Fox (AUS) (0)	-	Tereza Fišerová/Jakub Jáně (CZE) (0.89)
2022	Benjamin Savšek (SLO) (0.46)	Jessica Fox (AUS) (0.05)	-	Étienne Daille/Carole Bouzidi (FRA) (78.82)
2023	Luka Božič (SLO) (0.40)	Jessica Fox (AUS) (0.25)	-	-

=== Kayak ===
Season	K1 men	K1 women	Kayak cross men	Kayak cross women
2007	Alexander Grimm (GER) (0.48)	Jennifer Bongardt (GER) (0)	-	-
2008	Erik Pfannmöller (GER) (0.27)	Štěpánka Hilgertová (CZE) (0)	-	-
2009	Peter Kauzer (SLO) (0)	Elena Kaliská (SVK) (0.15)	-	-
2010	Daniele Molmenti (ITA) (0)	Jana Dukátová (SVK) (0.64)	-	-
2011	Daniele Molmenti (ITA) (0)	Jana Dukátová (SVK) (0.05)	-	-
2012	Étienne Daille (FRA) (0)	Jana Dukátová (SVK) (0)	-	-
2013	Étienne Daille (FRA) (0.14)	Émilie Fer (FRA) (0.43)	-	-
2014	Sebastian Schubert (GER) (1.28)	Corinna Kuhnle (AUT) (1.90)	-	-
2015	Boris Neveu (FRA) (0.21)	Jessica Fox (AUS) (1.32)	-	-
2016	Jiří Prskavec (CZE) (0.86)	Jessica Fox (AUS) (0.89)	-	-
2017	Vít Přindiš (CZE) (0.01)	Ricarda Funk (GER) (0)	-	-
2018	Vít Přindiš (CZE) (1.02)	Jessica Fox (AUS) (0)	-	-
2019	Jiří Prskavec (CZE) (0.68)	Jessica Fox (AUS) (0)	-	-
2020^{[c]}	Jiří Prskavec (CZE) (0.68)	Jessica Fox (AUS) (0)	-	-
2021	Jiří Prskavec (CZE) (0.36)	Jessica Fox (AUS) (0)	Mario Leitner (AUT) (165)	Jessica Fox (AUS) (175)
2022	Vít Přindiš (CZE) (0)	Jessica Fox (AUS) (0)	Joseph Clarke (GBR) (320)	Jessica Fox (AUS) (325)
2023	Jiří Prskavec (CZE) (0.14)	Jessica Fox (AUS) (0)	Joseph Clarke (GBR) (342)	Kimberley Woods (GBR) (338)

Notes
^{a} Following the 2018 Season, C2M events were dropped from the schedule of all major events due to their Olympic status being removed. Despite this, the ICF continued to calculate the C2M world rankings for two more years.
^{b} Following the 2019 Season, C2X events were dropped from the schedule of all major events. Despite this, the ICF continued to calculate the C2X world rankings until the third quarter of 2023.
^{c} The 2020 ICF World Rankings were frozen due to the ongoing COVID-19 pandemic, with all rankings maintained from the 2019 Season.
