= 2026 ICF Canoe Slalom World Championships – Men's K1 team =

Men's kayak teams at the 2026 ICF Canoe Slalom World Championships
- Venue: RIVERSPORT OKC
- Location: Oklahoma City, Oklahoma, United States
- Dates: 21 July 2026
- Competitors: 54 from 18 nations
- Teams: 18

Medalists
gold medal	Žiga Lin Hočevar; Lan Tominc; Peter Kauzer	Slovenia
silver medal	Martin Dougoud; Jan Rohrer; Gelindo Chiarello	Switzerland
bronze medal	Felix Oschmautz; Mario Leitner; Max Steinbrenner	Austria

The men's kayak team event at the 2026 ICF Canoe Slalom World Championships took place on 21 July 2026 at RIVERSPORT OKC in Oklahoma City.

== Competition format ==
Team events use a single run format with the team with the fastest time including penalties awarded gold. Teams consist of three paddlers from the same country.

Penalties are accumulated for each athlete, such that a team can incur a total of 150 seconds of penalties on a single gate (if all three miss it) or 6 seconds (if all three touch it). The time begins when the first paddler crosses the start beam and ends when the last one crosses the finish beam. All three paddlers must cross the finish line within 15 seconds of each other or else incur an additional 50-second penalty.

The teams had to navigate a total of 18 gates along the course, including 6 upstream gates (5-7-11-14-17-18).

== Results ==
Rank	Bib	Country	Athletes	Result		
Rank	Bib	Country	Athletes	Time	Pen	Total
1st place, gold medalist(s)	7	Slovenia	Žiga Lin Hočevar; Lan Tominc; Peter Kauzer	89.60	0	89.60
2nd place, silver medalist(s)	8	Switzerland	Martin Dougoud; Jan Rohrer; Gelindo Chiarello	89.71	0	89.71
3rd place, bronze medalist(s)	16	Austria	Felix Oschmautz; Mario Leitner; Max Steinbrenner	90.78	0	90.78
4	11	Poland	Mateusz Polaczyk; Michał Pasiut; Dariusz Popiela	86.93	4	90.93
5	3	Great Britain	Joseph Clarke; Ben Haylett; Sam Leaver	90.98	0	90.98
6	6	Czech Republic	Jakub Krejčí; Jiří Prskavec; Vít Přindiš	89.02	2	91.02
7	2	Japan	Kazuya Adachi; Yusuke Muto; Teppei Saito	92.25	0	92.25
8	17	Germany	Noah Hegge; Stefan Hengst; Christian Stanzel	90.60	4	94.60
9	4	Slovakia	Martin Halčin; Adam Gonšenica; Dávid Skubík	94.79	0	94.79
10	14	United States	Michal Smolen; Kaelin Friedenson; Tyler Westfall	95.09	0	95.09
11	15	Ireland	Noel Hendrick; Ben Brown; Reilly Vernon	96.11	2	98.11
12	12	Portugal	João Cunha; Frederico Alvarenga; Lucas Jacob	100.03	0	100.03
13	9	Spain	Pau Echaniz; Miquel Travé; David Llorente	94.20	6	100.20
14	10	China	Quan Xin; Hu Zhaoshan; Weng Jize	97.80	4	101.80
15	13	Canada	Alex Baldoni; Michal Smiesko; Maël Rivard	98.05	4	102.05
16	18	Chile	Andraz Echeverría Olguín; Geral Soto; Jesús Martínez	109.53	6	115.53
17	1	France	Titouan Castryck; Anatole Delassus; Martin Cornu	87.44	50	137.44
18	5	Australia	Lucien Delfour; Benjamin Pope; Timothy Anderson	91.14	50	141.14
