= Canoe slalom at the 2023 European Games – Men's kayak cross =

Men's kayak cross at the 2023 European Games
- Venue: Kraków-Kolna Canoe Slalom Course
- Date: 1-2 July
- Competitors: 52 from 23 nations

Medalists
gold medal	Ondřej Tunka	Czech Republic
silver medal	Felix Oschmautz	Austria
bronze medal	Vít Přindiš	Czech Republic

The men's kayak cross event at the 2023 European Games took place on 2 July 2023 at the Kraków-Kolna Canoe Slalom Course in Kraków, with the qualification on 1 July 2023.

== Competition format ==
The kayak cross event is split into two phases - qualification time trials and knockout phase where 4 paddlers race each other head-to-head. Top 16 paddlers from the qualification advance to the quarterfinal. There are 4 quarterfinal heats with the top 2 paddlers advancing from each to the semifinal. Same rules apply in the two semifinals and the medals are then decided in the final run.

Paddlers start the cross run by sliding off the starting platform several meters above the water. Then they must navigate the downstream and upstream gates. Unlike in classic slalom, paddlers are allowed to touch the gates and even intentionally move them with their paddle, but not with a free hand. There is also a designated zone where paddlers must perform an Eskimo roll.

Athletes can be penalized in three ways in each round, by receiving a fault (FLT) or by being ranked as lower (RAL). Faults are incurred for false starts, missing gates or failing to correctly perform the Eskimo roll. Athletes are ranked as lower (RAL) if they breach the safety requirements of the competition, such as by holding back another athlete with their hands or paddle, deliberately paddling over another athlete's boat, or by making dangerous contact with another athlete's head or body - all other non-dangerous contact is allowed. In each round athletes are ranked first by the order in which they cross the finish line, with those incurring penalties ranked in the following order: FLT, RAL, DNF, DNS.

The final classification of athletes is determined in the following manner: Athletes eliminated at any phase of the competition will be given their rank based on the comparison of the qualification times of athletes eliminated at the same phase. All 3rd ranked athletes will be ranked above all 4th ranked athletes. The final rank of athletes who did not progress to the heats is determined by their qualification results.

== Schedule ==
All times are Central European Summer Time (UTC+2)

Date	Time	Round
1 July 2023
1 July 2023	15:05	Qualification
2 July 2023
2 July 2023	15:05	Quarterfinals
2 July 2023	15:38	Semifinals
2 July 2023	15:59	Final

== Results ==
=== Qualification ===
Rank	Bib	Athlete	Country	Time	Notes
1	3	Stefan Hengst	Germany	61.85	Q
2	23	Titouan Castryck	France	61.98	Q
3	8	Benjamin Renia	France	62.32	Q
4	14	Boris Neveu	France	62.79	Q
5	16	Christopher Bowers	Great Britain	63.09	Q
6	22	Mateusz Polaczyk	Poland	63.49	Q
7	18	Ondřej Tunka	Czech Republic	63.64	Q
8	5	Mario Leitner	Austria	63.84	Q
9	19	Alistair McCreery	Ireland	63.87	Q
10	15	David Llorente	Spain	63.96	Q
11	6	Vít Přindiš	Czech Republic	63.98	Q
12	25	Manuel Munsch	Switzerland	64.03	Q
13	11	Felix Oschmautz	Austria	64.48	Q
14	2	Dimitri Marx	Switzerland	64.90	Q
15	33	Jonny Dickson	Great Britain	64.94	Q
16	4	Giovanni De Gennaro	Italy	64.95	Q
17	9	Hannes Aigner	Germany	65.06	
18	10	Jan Rohrer	Switzerland	65.27	
19	17	Erik Holmer	Sweden	65.39	
20	27	Fredrik Wahlén	Sweden	66.06	
21	30	Pau Echaniz	Spain	66.25	
22	29	Noah Hegge	Germany	66.31	
23	28	Jakub Krejčí	Czech Republic	66.59	
24	40	Davide Ghisetti	Italy	66.59	
25	42	Ritvars Celmiņš	Latvia	67.55	
26	24	Oleksandr Fedorenko	Ukraine	68.65	
27	13	Tine Kancler	Slovenia	69.85	
28	47	Angel Petrushev	North Macedonia	70.20	
29	26	Serhii Sovko	Ukraine	70.26	
30	49	Peter Kauzer	Slovenia	70.35	
31	52	Lucas Jacob	Portugal	72.67	
32	41	Edgars Gravitis	Latvia	72.71	
33	34	Artem Ivchenko	Ukraine	73.16	
34	39	Ren Korpes	Croatia	73.24	
35	45	Charalampos Troiannos	Greece	73.79	
36	36	Mārtiņš Plaudis	Latvia	74.74	
37	48	Nils Biermans	Netherlands	74.76	
38	21	Martin Halčin	Slovakia	75.46	
39	50	Dirk Hermans	Netherlands	76.02	
40	37	Ilja Buran	Slovakia	76.78	
41	51	Emir Abdihodžić	Bosnia and Herzegovina	78.72	
42	12	Isak Öhrström	Sweden	67.64	FLT (6)
43	31	Lorand Gjoshi	Kosovo	68.88	FLT (6)
44	20	Gabriel De Coster	Belgium	71.52	FLT (6)
45	7	Vid Kuder Marušič	Slovenia	75.43	FLT (6)
46	44	Leonardo Proietti	Italy	77.62	FLT (6)
47	46	Tadeusz Kuchno	Poland	67.24	FLT (4)
48	43	Kacper Sztuba	Poland	67.26	FLT (4)
49	38	Paul Preisl	Austria	69.95	FLT (4)
50	1	Joe Clarke	Great Britain	73.62	FLT (4, 6)
51	35	Jakub Grigar	Slovakia	67.67	FLT (S, 6)
-	32	Miquel Travé	Spain	-	DNS

=== Knockout rounds ===
==== Quarterfinals ====
Heat 1

Rank	Bib	Name	Country	Notes
1	8	Mario Leitner	Austria	Q
2	1	Stefan Hengst	Germany	Q
3	12	Manuel Munsch	Switzerland	
4	16	Giovanni De Gennaro	Italy	FLT (6)

Heat 2

Rank	Bib	Name	Country	Notes
1	4	Boris Neveu	France	Q
2	13	Felix Oschmautz	Austria	Q
3	9	Alistair McCreery	Ireland	
4	5	Christopher Bowers	Great Britain	FLT (1)

Heat 3

Rank	Bib	Name	Country	Notes
1	3	Benjamin Renia	France	Q
2	6	Mateusz Polaczyk	Poland	Q
3	14	Dimitri Marx	Switzerland	FLT (S)
4	10	David Llorente	Spain	FLT (3, R)

Heat 4

Rank	Bib	Name	Country	Notes
1	11	Vít Přindiš	Czech Republic	Q
2	7	Ondřej Tunka	Czech Republic	Q
3	2	Titouan Castryck	France	FLT (6)
4	15	Jonny Dickson	Great Britain	FLT (3)

==== Semifinals ====
Heat 1

Rank	Bib	Name	Country	Notes
1	4	Boris Neveu	France	Q
2	13	Felix Oschmautz	Austria	Q
3	1	Stefan Hengst	Germany	
4	8	Mario Leitner	Austria	FLT (7)

Heat 2

Rank	Bib	Name	Country	Notes
1	11	Vít Přindiš	Czech Republic	Q
2	7	Ondřej Tunka	Czech Republic	Q
3	6	Mateusz Polaczyk	Poland	
4	3	Benjamin Renia	France	FLT (6)

==== Final ====
Rank	Bib	Name	Country	Notes
1st place, gold medalist(s)	7	Ondřej Tunka	Czech Republic	
2nd place, silver medalist(s)	13	Felix Oschmautz	Austria	
3rd place, bronze medalist(s)	11	Vít Přindiš	Czech Republic	FLT (4)
4	4	Boris Neveu	France	FLT (R)

=== Final ranking (Top 16) ===
The top 16 ranking determined by the knockout rounds. Bib numbers correspond to qualification ranking.

Rank	Bib	Athlete	Country	Heat rank
1st place, gold medalist(s)	7	Ondřej Tunka	Czech Republic	1
2nd place, silver medalist(s)	13	Felix Oschmautz	Austria	2
3rd place, bronze medalist(s)	11	Vít Přindiš	Czech Republic	3
4	4	Boris Neveu	France	4
5	1	Stefan Hengst	Germany	SF1 (3)
6	6	Mateusz Polaczyk	Poland	SF2 (3)
7	3	Benjamin Renia	France	SF2 (4)
8	8	Mario Leitner	Austria	SF1 (4)
9	2	Titouan Castryck	France	QF4 (3)
10	9	Alistair McCreery	Ireland	QF2 (3)
11	12	Manuel Munsch	Switzerland	QF1 (3)
12	14	Dimitri Marx	Switzerland	QF3 (3)
13	5	Christopher Bowers	Great Britain	QF2 (4)
14	10	David Llorente	Spain	QF3 (4)
15	15	Jonny Dickson	Great Britain	QF4 (4)
16	16	Giovanni De Gennaro	Italy	QF1 (4)
