= 2022 ICF Canoe Slalom World Championships – Men's K1 =

Men's kayak at the 2022 ICF Canoe Slalom World Championships
- Venue: Augsburg Eiskanal
- Location: Augsburg, Germany
- Dates: 28-30 July 2022
- Competitors: 104 from 41 nations

Medalists
gold medal	Vít Přindiš	Czech Republic
silver medal	Giovanni De Gennaro	Italy
bronze medal	Boris Neveu	France

The men's kayak event at the 2022 ICF Canoe Slalom World Championships took place on 30 July 2022 at the Augsburg Eiskanal in Augsburg, with the qualification heats on 28 July 2022.

== Competition format ==
The event uses a three-round format with qualification heats, semifinal and final. Paddlers complete up to two runs in the heats, with the top ranked athletes starting last. In the first heat, the 30 fastest paddlers qualify automatically for the semifinal, whilst the rest compete in the second heat for additional 10 qualification spots. The final rank of non-qualifying athletes is determined by their second run score. Paddlers start in the reverse order of their heats position in the semifinal and complete a single run, with the top 10 advancing to the final. The start list for the final is once again in reverse order of the semifinal results. The athlete with the best time in the single-run final is awarded gold.

A penalty of 2 seconds is awarded for touching a gate and a 50-second penalty is awarded for missing a gate or negotiating it in the opposite direction.

An easier gate setup is generally used for the heats and then a more difficult one for semifinal and final.

== Schedule ==
All times are Central European Summer Time (UTC+2)

Date	Time	Round
28 July 2022
28 July 2022	10:34	Heats Run 1
28 July 2022	15:13	Heats Run 2
30 July 2022
30 July 2022	10:08	Semifinal
30 July 2022	12:42	Final

== Results ==
Penalties are included in the time shown. The fastest time in each round is shown in bold.

Rank	Bib	Athlete	Country	Heats						Semifinal			Final		
Rank	Bib	Athlete	Country	Run 1			Run 2			Semifinal			Final		
Rank	Bib	Athlete	Country	Time	Pen	Rank	Time	Pen	Rank	Time	Pen	Rank	Time	Pen	Rank
1st place, gold medalist(s)	3	Vít Přindiš	Czech Republic	**86.83**	0	1	-			95.31	0	3	**94.78**	0	1
2nd place, silver medalist(s)	4	Giovanni De Gennaro	Italy	88.41	0	3	-			95.09	2	2	95.49	0	2
3rd place, bronze medalist(s)	6	Boris Neveu	France	89.93	0	13	-			96.95	0	10	95.75	0	3
4	12	Jakub Grigar	Slovakia	89.83	0	12	-			96.51	2	8	96.38	0	4
5	1	Jiří Prskavec	Czech Republic	87.37	0	2	-			95.86	2	5	98.23	4	5
6	13	Felix Oschmautz	Austria	94.66	6	36	**88.45**	0	1	96.34	0	7	98.88	2	6
7	40	Quan Xin	China	91.43	0	21	-			96.61	0	9	99.58	2	7
8	41	Titouan Castryck	France	90.39	2	15	-			96.02	0	6	101.67	4	8
9	33	Kazuya Adachi	Japan	89.57	0	9	-			95.63	0	4	104.09	6	9
10	2	Peter Kauzer	Slovenia	92.66	2	28	-			**94.76**	0	1	107.90	4	10
11	24	Christopher Bowers	Great Britain	94.22	0	33	89.65	0	2	97.07	0	11	did not advance		
12	25	Malo Quéméneur	France	88.74	0	4	-			97.16	2	12	did not advance		
13	21	Mario Leitner	Austria	91.65	0	23	-			97.20	0	13	did not advance		
14	7	Hannes Aigner	Germany	89.53	0	8	-			97.44	0	14	did not advance		
15	9	Lucien Delfour	Australia	90.90	2	18	-			97.83	0	15	did not advance		
16	5	Joseph Clarke	Great Britain	91.99	2	25	-			98.57	2	16	did not advance		
17	15	Stefan Hengst	Germany	88.87	0	5	-			99.27	4	17	did not advance		
18	19	Lukas Werro	Switzerland	90.82	0	17	-			99.40	2	18	did not advance		
19	23	Dariusz Popiela	Poland	97.04	2	46	90.80	0	8	99.59	2	19	did not advance		
20	51	Noel Hendrick	Ireland	96.27	4	42	90.00	0	3	100.13	2	20	did not advance		
21	11	Ondřej Tunka	Czech Republic	92.22	2	27	-			102.93	2	21	did not advance		
22	39	Miquel Travé	Spain	90.21	0	14	-			103.46	4	22	did not advance		
23	36	Mathieu Desnos	Brazil	91.13	0	20	-			104.02	2	23	did not advance		
24	28	Isak Öhrström	Sweden	91.65	0	23	-			104.27	4	24	did not advance		
25	14	Martin Srabotnik	Slovenia	93.02	2	29	-			104.60	2	25	did not advance		
26	29	Zeno Ivaldi	Italy	89.57	0	9	-			104.82	8	26	did not advance		
27	31	Gelindo Chiarello	Switzerland	94.02	0	32	90.32	0	5	104.83	2	27	did not advance		
28	53	Yuuki Tanaka	Japan	92.02	0	26	-			105.76	6	28	did not advance		
29	17	Bradley Forbes-Cryans	Great Britain	91.08	0	19	-			106.40	2	29	did not advance		
30	34	Vid Kuder Marušič	Slovenia	148.90	54	89	91.95	2	10	107.77	8	30	did not advance		
31	42	Adam Gonšenica	Slovakia	95.80	2	40	90.28	0	4	108.44	4	31	did not advance		
32	32	Pedro Gonçalves	Brazil	98.24	6	51	90.77	0	7	115.69	8	32	did not advance		
33	30	Timothy Anderson	Australia	89.30	0	7	-			146.51	50	33	did not advance		
34	38	Erik Holmer	Sweden	97.94	6	49	90.73	0	6	151.90	52	34	did not advance		
35	8	Martin Dougoud	Switzerland	90.67	2	16	-			152.25	52	35	did not advance		
36	43	Mathis Soudi	Morocco	88.88	0	6	-			152.62	52	36	did not advance		
37	10	Joan Crespo	Spain	91.59	0	22	-			153.81	56	37	did not advance		
38	35	Benjamin Pope	Australia	89.82	0	11	-			156.12	52	38	did not advance		
39	16	Michał Pasiut	Poland	93.24	4	30	-			201.31	102	39	did not advance		
40	37	Jakub Brzeziński	Poland	96.24	2	41	91.09	0	9	212.45	104	40	did not advance		
41	27	Finn Butcher	New Zealand	143.43	54	85	92.37	2	11	did not advance					
42	18	Noah Hegge	Germany	94.29	4	35	92.95	2	12	did not advance					
43	45	Manuel Ochoa	Spain	107.97	0	73	93.12	0	13	did not advance					
44	20	Marcello Beda	Italy	94.99	2	37	94.02	2	14	did not advance					
45	66	Ritvars Celmiņš	Latvia	103.11	6	62	94.68	2	15	did not advance					
46	73	Huang Liman	China	98.67	2	52	94.79	0	16	did not advance					
47	22	Martin Halčin	Slovakia	95.77	4	39	95.32	2	17	did not advance					
48	52	Tyler Westfall	United States	166.34	54	93	95.59	4	18	did not advance					
49	56	Angel Petrushev	North Macedonia	359.36	250	102	96.00	2	19	did not advance					
50	63	Mustafa Arda Acar	Turkey	102.98	2	61	96.04	0	20	did not advance					
51	48	Yusuke Muto	Japan	96.95	4	45	96.27	2	21	did not advance					
52	68	Paul Preisl	Austria	99.24	0	54	96.86	0	22	did not advance					
53	59	Koppány Rácz	Hungary	101.33	2	57	97.00	2	23	did not advance					
54	49	Zack Mutton	New Zealand	96.29	0	43	97.59	2	24	did not advance					
55	60	Kaelin Friedenson	United States	98.18	2	50	97.69	4	25	did not advance					
56	44	Joshua Joseph	United States	97.14	0	47	97.88	4	26	did not advance					
57	96	João Cunha	Portugal	101.91	0	60	97.96	2	27	did not advance					
58	65	Roko Bengeri	Croatia	146.46	52	87	99.77	4	28	did not advance					
59	61	Alex Baldoni	Canada	96.54	4	44	100.65	2	29	did not advance					
60	67	Serhii Sovko	Ukraine	104.70	2	65	101.24	2	30	did not advance					
61	87	Lyu Luhui	China	101.53	2	58	101.92	0	31	did not advance					
62	74	Maxime Aubertin	Belgium	94.24	0	34	102.33	2	32	did not advance					
63	69	Victor Hennin	Belgium	100.02	4	55	103.50	6	33	did not advance					
64	70	Miloš Jevtić	Serbia	105.53	4	67	104.96	4	34	did not advance					
65	88	Mārtiņš Plaudis	Latvia	171.55	58	97	106.63	6	35	did not advance					
66	80	Djanibek Temirgaliev	Uzbekistan	107.82	6	70	106.80	0	36	did not advance					
67	62	Maël Rivard	Canada	111.55	8	76	107.99	8	37	did not advance					
68	89	Artem Ivchenko	Ukraine	154.90	54	90	108.40	8	38	did not advance					
69	82	Barkamol Mirzakhamdamov	Uzbekistan	107.86	4	71	110.74	2	39	did not advance					
70	83	Tarık Tuğcu	Turkey	124.36	6	81	112.46	6	40	did not advance					
71	79	Mantas Atmanavičius	Lithuania	171.39	58	96	114.90	8	41	did not advance					
72	93	Donovan Wewege	South Africa	174.48	52	98	115.63	4	42	did not advance					
73	94	Vėjas Pranskūnas	Lithuania	113.59	6	77	116.60	12	43	did not advance					
74	81	Yusuf Ertek	Turkey	310.83	200	100	119.81	10	44	did not advance					
75	76	Oleksandr Fedorenko	Ukraine	105.52	6	66	120.91	6	45	did not advance					
76	71	Marko Đorđević	Serbia	106.06	2	69	122.42	0	46	did not advance					
77	64	Charalampos Troiannos	Greece	123.58	8	80	125.16	10	47	did not advance					
78	84	Antonio Reinoso	Mexico	107.92	2	72	125.49	6	48	did not advance					
79	104	Stefan Ribarski	North Macedonia	109.08	0	74	127.33	8	49	did not advance					
80	85	Vilius Rasimavičius	Lithuania	110.05	4	75	128.89	4	50	did not advance					
81	95	Vuk Bazic	Serbia	163.00	52	92	134.19	14	51	did not advance					
82	47	Fredrik Wahlén	Sweden	147.36	50	88	144.90	50	52	did not advance					
83	54	Guilherme Rodrigues	Brazil	105.74	0	68	146.69	52	53	did not advance					
84	97	Patrick Kozma	Romania	133.12	4	83	147.55	8	54	did not advance					
85	78	Lorand Gjoshi	Kosovo	100.56	2	56	148.08	52	55	did not advance					
86	55	Ren Korpes	Croatia	97.93	0	48	150.38	52	56	did not advance					
87	99	Pradhyumna Singh Rathod	India	157.84	12	91	150.80	6	57	did not advance					
88	75	Thomas Ukalovic	Croatia	145.57	52	86	150.98	56	58	did not advance					
89	86	Thibaud Lacour	Romania	98.67	0	52	151.36	52	59	did not advance					
90	50	Alistair McCreery	Ireland	103.94	4	64	153.35	54	60	did not advance					
91	98	Eriberto Gutierrez Robles	Peru	122.54	4	79	153.42	4	61	did not advance					
92	77	Nour Ait Kaddour	Morocco	168.73	58	94	159.59	56	62	did not advance					
93	58	Trevor Boyd	Canada	103.31	6	63	165.21	52	63	did not advance					
94	26	Callum Gilbert	New Zealand	101.62	6	59	200.34	102	64	did not advance					
95	91	Dheeraj Keer	India	169.88	12	95	201.72	12	65	did not advance					
96	101	Solomon Maragh	Jamaica	287.29	160	99	201.94	62	66	did not advance					
97	72	Edgars Gravitis	Latvia	125.50	6	82	206.21	106	67	did not advance					
98	102	Borche Mirchevski	North Macedonia	113.69	4	78	211.97	104	68	did not advance					
99	103	Hitesh Kewat	India	318.66	112	101	221.91	58	69	did not advance					
100	46	Gabriel De Coster	Belgium	93.71	2	31	248.58	152	70	did not advance					
101	57	Samuel Curtis	Ireland	95.39	2	38	249.25	152	71	did not advance					
102	90	Matteo-Alexander Olar	Romania	134.30	10	84	280.13	156	72	did not advance					
-	100	Emir Abdihodžić	Bosnia and Herzegovina	DNS			DNS			did not advance					
-	92	Dušan Mačkić	Bosnia and Herzegovina	DNS			DNS			did not advance					
