= 2024 European Canoe Slalom Championships =

2024 ECA Canoe Slalom European Championships
- Venue: Tacen Whitewater Course
- Location: Tacen, Slovenia
- Dates: 15 to 19 May 2024

The 2024 European Canoe Slalom Championships took place from 15 to 19 May in Tacen, Slovenia under the auspices of the European Canoe Association (ECA). It was the 25th edition of the competition. Tacen hosted the event for the third time after previously hosting it in 2005 and 2017.

It was the first major international competition on the Tacen Whitewater Course after the floods in early August 2023, which had caused major damage to the facilities.

A new medal event was introduced at these championships, the kayak cross individual, which also served as a qualification time trial for the main kayak cross event. The first titles were claimed by Alena Marx and Vít Přindiš.

The original schedule had to be amended due to high water level of the river Sava on Friday, 16 May. The classic slalom events only had 1 run of qualification with the top 12 paddlers advancing straight to the final, as opposed to 2 qualification rounds, a semifinal and a final.

== Medals Table ==
* Host nation (Slovenia)

Rank	Nation	Gold	Silver	Bronze	Total
1	Czech Republic	3	2	1	6
1	Slovenia*	3	2	1	6
3	Switzerland	2	1	2	5
4	Great Britain	1	1	3	5
5	Poland	1	1	0	2
6	Germany	1	0	0	1
6	Italy	1	0	0	1
8	France	0	2	3	5
9	Austria	0	2	0	2
10	Slovakia	0	1	1	2
11	Spain	0	0	1	1
Totals (11 entries)		12	12	12	36

== Medal summary ==
=== Men ===
==== Canoe ====
Event	Gold		Silver		Bronze	
C1	Žiga Lin Hočevar; Slovenia	90.32	Luka Božič; Slovenia	91.16	Benjamin Savšek; Slovenia	91.39
C1 team	Slovenia; Benjamin Savšek; Luka Božič; Žiga Lin Hočevar	104.95	Czech Republic; Jiří Prskavec; Lukáš Rohan; Václav Chaloupka	105.18	Slovakia; Matej Beňuš; Michal Martikán; Marko Mirgorodský	106.31

==== Kayak ====
Event	Gold		Silver		Bronze	
K1	Giovanni De Gennaro; Italy	86.56	Mario Leitner; Austria	89.52	Gelindo Chiarello; Switzerland	90.43
K1 team	Czech Republic; Jiří Prskavec; Vít Přindiš; Jakub Krejčí	105.17	Austria; Felix Oschmautz; Mario Leitner; Moritz Kremslehner	109.52	France; Titouan Castryck; Anatole Delassus; Vincent Delahaye	109.86
Kayak cross individual	Vít Přindiš; Czech Republic	49.21	Jonny Dickson; Great Britain	50.16	Martin Dougoud; Switzerland	50.87
Kayak cross	Joseph Clarke; Great Britain		Jan Rohrer; Switzerland		David Llorente; Spain	

=== Women ===
==== Canoe ====
Event	Gold		Silver		Bronze	
C1	Andrea Herzog; Germany	101.24	Gabriela Satková; Czech Republic	105.04	Marjorie Delassus; France	107.76
C1 team	Czech Republic; Tereza Kneblová; Gabriela Satková; Martina Satková	119.61	Slovenia; Eva Alina Hočevar; Lea Novak; Alja Kozorog	127.73	Great Britain; Mallory Franklin; Kimberley Woods; Ellis Miller	128.25

==== Kayak ====
Event	Gold		Silver		Bronze	
K1	Klaudia Zwolińska; Poland	95.77	Zuzana Paňková; Slovakia	100.72	Mallory Franklin; Great Britain	102.30
K1 team	Slovenia; Eva Terčelj; Eva Alina Hočevar; Ajda Novak	124.55	France; Camille Prigent; Emma Vuitton; Coline Charel	131.82	Czech Republic; Antonie Galušková; Kateřina Beková; Tereza Fišerová	133.77
Kayak cross individual	Alena Marx; Switzerland	56.37	Klaudia Zwolińska; Poland	56.59	Camille Prigent; France	57.05
Kayak cross	Alena Marx; Switzerland		Camille Prigent; France		Nikita Setchell; Great Britain	
