= Lan Tominc =

Slovenian canoeist (born 2002)

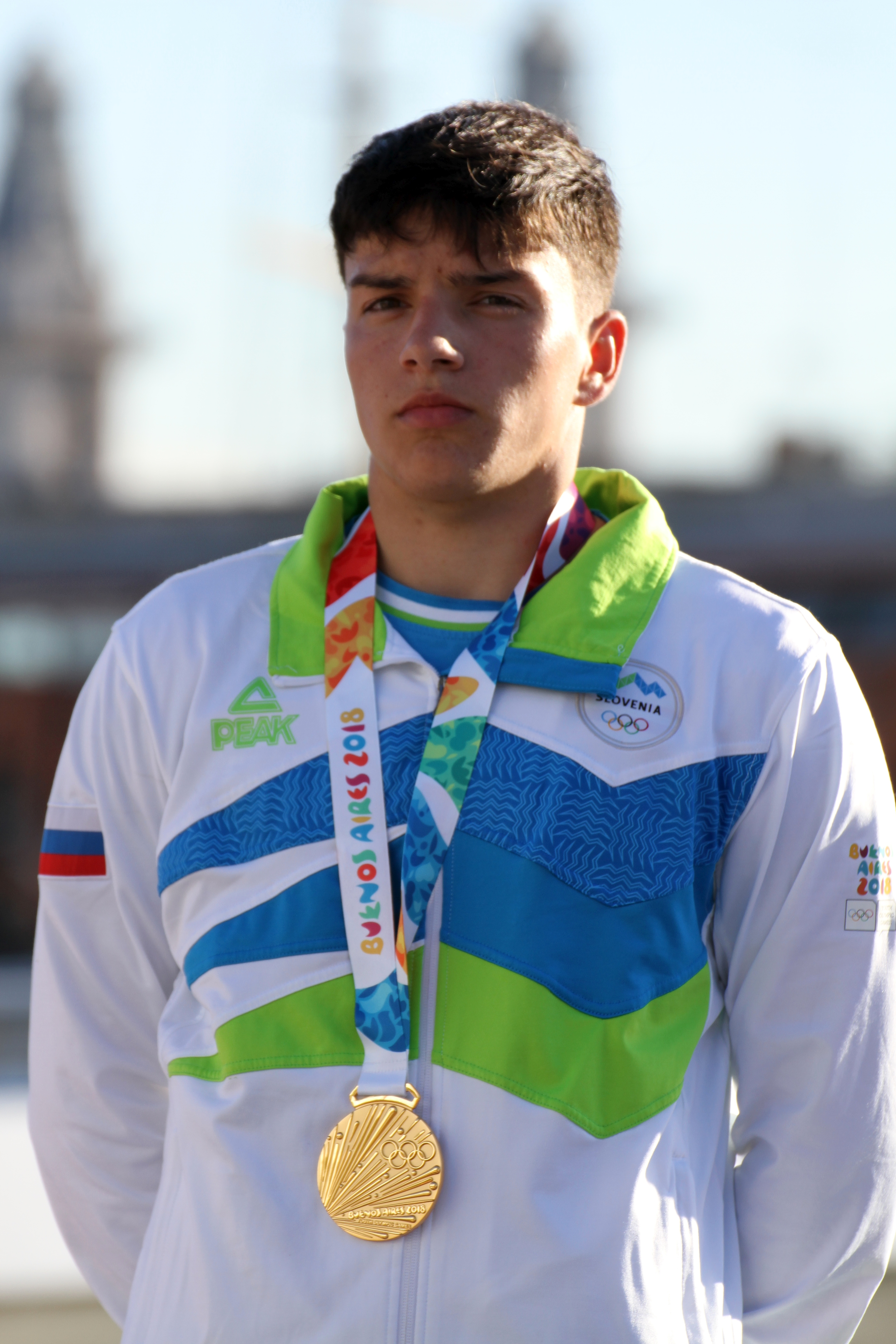
- Tominc in 2018

Personal information
- Born: 15 May 2002 (age 24)

Sport
- Country: Slovenia
- Sport: Canoe slalom
- Event: K1
- Club: Kajak kanu klub Nivo Celje
Medal record
Canoe slalom
Representing Slovenia
World Championships
Gold medal – first place	2026 Oklahoma City	K1 team
Youth Olympic Games
Gold medal – first place	2018 Buenos Aires	K1
U23 World Championships
Bronze medal – third place	2024 Liptovský Mikuláš	K1

Lan Tominc (born 15 May 2002) is a Slovenian slalom canoeist has competed at the international level since 2017, specializing in the K1 (kayak) event.

He won a gold medal in the K1 team event at the 2026 ICF Canoe Slalom World Championships in Oklahoma City.

Representing Slovenia and Kajak kanu klub Nivo Celje, he won the gold medal in the boys' K1 slalom at the 2018 Summer Youth Olympics and the bronze medal in men's K1 at the 2024 U23 World Championships in Liptovský Mikuláš.

== Career ==
=== Junior career ===
Tominc appears in international junior results from 2017, when he raced in K1 at the 2017 World Junior and U23 Canoe Slalom Championships in Bratislava, reaching the semifinal and placing fifth with Slovenia in the K1x3 junior team event. In 2018 he competed at the ICF Youth Olympic Games canoeing world qualification event in Barcelona, winning the men's K1 junior final A and securing a quota place for Slovenia for the Youth Olympic Games in Buenos Aires.

At the 2018 Summer Youth Olympics he competed in the combined canoe sprint and slalom programme but made his impact in slalom. In the boys' K1 slalom event he defeated China's Guan Changheng and France's Tom Bouchardon to win gold for Slovenia at the Puerto Madero course in Buenos Aires. In the same season he also raced at the 2018 ICF Junior & U23 World Championships in Ivrea, where he reached the semifinal in men's K1 junior and placed seventh in the K1x3 junior team event for Slovenia.

Tominc continued in the junior category in 2019. At the ECA Junior and U23 Canoe Slalom European Championships in Liptovský Mikuláš he finished third in the men's K1 junior heats and went on to place tenth in the final and sixth in the K1x3 junior team competition. Later that year, at the ICF Junior & U23 World Championships in Kraków, he again reached the men's K1 junior final, finishing seventh, and was eighth with Slovenia in the K1x3 junior team event.

In 2020 he won the men's K1 under-18 category at the opening race of the ECA Junior Slalom Cup series in Solkan, beating fellow Slovenians Urban Gajšek and Jan Ločnikar. He also made the junior K1 semifinal at the 2020 ECA Junior and U23 European Championships in Kraków and took fifth place in the K1x3 junior team event.

=== U23 level ===
Tominc moved into the under-23 category for major championships from 2020 onwards. At the 2021 ECA Junior and U23 European Championships in Solkan he competed in men's K1 U23 and helped Slovenia to fifth place in the K1x3 U23 team event.

In 2022 he raced for Slovenia at the ECA Junior and U23 European Championships in České Budějovice and at the ICF Junior & U23 World Championships in Ivrea, regularly qualifying for semifinals in men's K1 U23 and taking a junior K1x3 team bronze at the European event.

Tominc had one of his strongest U23 seasons in 2023. At the ECA Junior and U23 European Championships in Bratislava he reached the men's K1 U23 final and finished fifth; he was also part of the Slovenian K1x3 U23 team that placed eighth.

At the 2024 ICF Junior and U23 World Championships in Liptovský Mikuláš Tominc won his first world championship medal at U23 level. In the men's K1 U23 final he finished third behind France's Anatole Delassus and Jakub Krejčí of the Czech Republic, taking bronze with a total time of 90.93 seconds. At continental level in 2024 he raced at the ECA Junior and U23 European Championships in Kraków, placing in the top ten of the men's K1 U23 final and taking seventh place with Slovenia in the K1x3 U23 team competition.

The Slovenian Canoe Federation's 2025 season plan lists Tominc as a pre-selected member of the under-23 men's K1 national team, alongside Eva Alina Hočevar in the women's categories.

=== Senior career ===
Tominc has also competed for Slovenia at senior level in the Canoe Slalom World Cup, world championships and continental championships. He joined the World Cup circuit in the early 2020s and has raced regularly in men's K1 since the 2022 season, including appearances in Augsburg, Prague, Kraków, Pau and Ljubljana–Tacen.

At the 2023 World Cup round in Ljubljana–Tacen he reached the men's K1 semifinal on home water, after being selected as part of a younger men's kayak squad together with Žiga Lin Hočevar to support veteran Peter Kauzer.

In 2023 Tominc represented Slovenia at the 2023 European Games in Kraków–Małopolska. In the men's K1 event he advanced from the heats and finished 32nd overall in the semifinal round, while in the men's K1 team event he, Peter Kauzer and Žiga Lin Hočevar placed eighth for Slovenia.

The 2024 season marked a breakthrough for Tominc at senior level. In April he won the men's kayak event at the ECA I Feel Slovenia Tacen 2024 European Open Canoe Slalom Cup and ICF ranking race on the Sava River in Ljubljana, ahead of an international field of paddlers.

During the 2024 Canoe Slalom World Cup series he reached multiple K1 finals. In Prague he qualified sixth from the heats and placed eighth in the final. One week later he secured a fourth-place finish at the Kraków World Cup round, after qualifying for the final with the third-fastest time in the semifinal. Later in the season he again finished fourth in men's K1 at the Ivrea World Cup round and qualified for the World Cup Final in La Seu d'Urgell, where he reached the semifinal.

At the 2024 ECA Canoe Slalom European Championships in Ljubljana he competed in men's K1 and in the K1x3 team event, with Slovenia finishing seventh in the team race.

Tominc has been listed among the top 20 athletes in the ICF men's K1 world rankings for canoe slalom.

In April 2025 he took a bronze medal in men's K1 at an ICF world ranking race in Solkan, finishing behind Italy's Xabier Ferrazzi and fellow Slovenian Žiga Lin Hočevar as part of a home event dominated by Slovenian paddlers.

== Style and training ==
Tominc competes primarily in kayak slalom but has also raced in canoe sprint events at junior level, including at the 2018 Youth Olympic qualification regatta in Barcelona. He paddles for Kajak kanu klub Nivo Celje and has been described by the Slovenian federation and media as part of a younger generation of Slovenian slalom paddlers emerging alongside established names such as Benjamin Savšek and Peter Kauzer.
