= Gelindo Chiarello =

Swiss slalom canoeist (born 1997)

Personal information
- Nationality: Swiss
- Born: 23 October 1997 (age 28)

Sport
- Country: Switzerland
- Sport: Canoe slalom
- Event: K1, Kayak cross
Medal record
Men's canoe slalom
Representing Switzerland
World Championships
Silver medal – second place	2026 Oklahoma City	K1 team
European Championships
Bronze medal – third place	2024 Tacen	K1
U23 European Championships
Bronze medal – third place	2018 Bratislava	K1 team

Gelindo Chiarello (born 23 October 1997) is a Swiss slalom canoeist who has competed at the international level since 2012, specializing mainly in K1 and kayak cross.

He won a silver medal in the K1 team event at the 2026 ICF Canoe Slalom World Championships in Oklahoma City.

He also won a bronze medal in the K1 event at the 2024 European Championships in Tacen.
