= Žiga Lin Hočevar =

Slovenian slalom canoeist

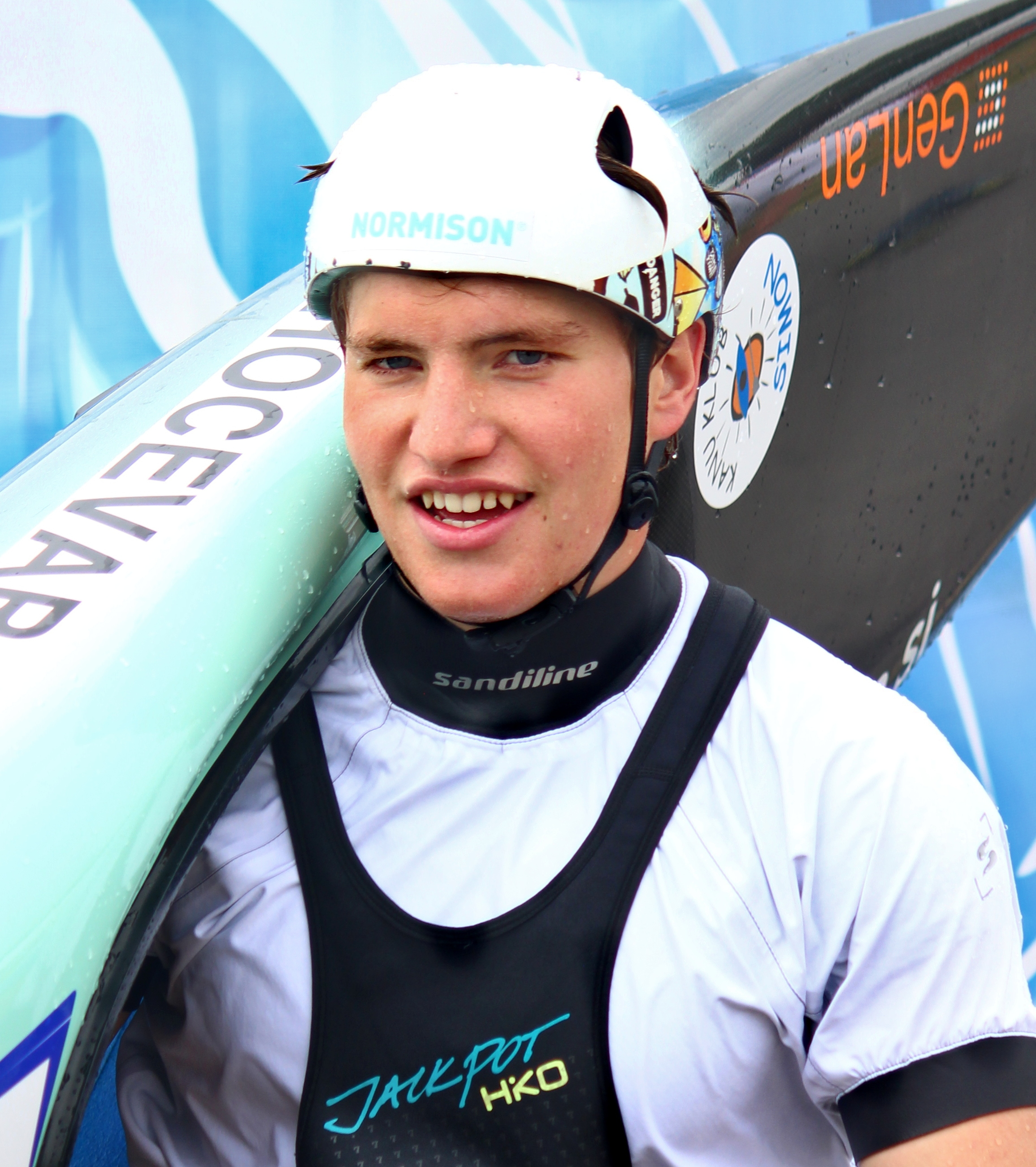

Personal information
- Nationality: Slovenian
- Born: 23 June 2007 (age 19)

Sport
- Country: Slovenia
- Sport: Canoe slalom
- Event: C1, K1, Kayak cross
Medal record
Men's canoe slalom
Representing Slovenia
World Championships
Gold medal – first place	2026 Oklahoma City	K1 team
Bronze medal – third place	2025 Penrith	C1 team
European Championships
Gold medal – first place	2024 Tacen	C1
Gold medal – first place	2024 Tacen	C1 team
Silver medal – second place	2025 Vaires-sur-Marne	C1 team
Bronze medal – third place	2025 Vaires-sur-Marne	C1
U23 World Championships
Silver medal – second place	2024 Liptovský Mikuláš	C1 team
Bronze medal – third place	2022 Ivrea	C1 team
U23 European Championships
Gold medal – first place	2022 České Budějovice	C1 team
Gold medal – first place	2024 Kraków	C1 team
Bronze medal – third place	2023 Bratislava	C1 team
Junior World Championships
Gold medal – first place	2023 Kraków	C1
Gold medal – first place	2024 Liptovský Mikuláš	C1
Gold medal – first place	2024 Liptovský Mikuláš	K1
Gold medal – first place	2025 Foix	Kayak cross
Gold medal – first place	2025 Foix	Kayak cross individual
Gold medal – first place	2025 Foix	K1 team
Silver medal – second place	2024 Liptovský Mikuláš	Kayak cross
Silver medal – second place	2025 Foix	C1
Silver medal – second place	2025 Foix	K1
Bronze medal – third place	2023 Kraków	K1
Junior European Championships
Gold medal – first place	2022 České Budějovice	K1 team
Gold medal – first place	2024 Kraków	C1
Gold medal – first place	2025 Solkan	Kayak cross individual
Silver medal – second place	2022 České Budějovice	C1
Silver medal – second place	2022 České Budějovice	K1
Silver medal – second place	2024 Kraków	K1
Bronze medal – third place	2023 Bratislava	K1
Bronze medal – third place	2023 Bratislava	C1 team
Bronze medal – third place	2024 Kraków	Kayak cross
Bronze medal – third place	2025 Solkan	C1

Žiga Lin Hočevar (born 23 June 2007) is a Slovenian slalom canoeist who has competed at the international level since 2022. Žiga Lin competes in all canoe slalom disciplines (C1, K1 and kayak cross).

He won two medals at the ICF Canoe Slalom World Championships with a gold (K1 team: 2026) and a bronze (C1 team: 2025).

He also won four medals at the European Championships with 2 golds, 1 silver and 1 bronze.

Hočevar is the overall World Cup champion in C1 from 2026.

His father Simon Hočevar and his older sister Eva Alina Hočevar are also successful slalom canoeists.

== World Cup individual podiums ==
Season	Date	Venue	Position	Event
2024	1 June 2024	Augsburg	1st	C1
2025	29 August 2025	Tacen	2nd	K1
2026	30 May 2026	Tacen	1st	C1
2026	31 May 2026	Tacen	1st	Kayak cross
2026	4 September 2026	Vaires-sur-Marne	2nd	C1
2026	12 September 2026	La Seu d'Urgell	2nd	C1
