= Max Steinbrenner =

Austrian slalom canoeist (born 2009)

Personal information
- Nationality: Austrian
- Born: 1 June 2009 (age 17)

Sport
- Country: Austria
- Sport: Canoe slalom
- Event: K1, Kayak cross
Medal record
Men's canoe slalom
Representing Austria
World Championships
Bronze medal – third place	2026 Oklahoma City	K1 team
Junior World Championships
Gold medal – first place	2026 Kraków	K1
Silver medal – second place	2026 Kraków	Kayak cross
Junior European Championships
Gold medal – first place	2026 Épinal	Kayak cross
European Youth Olympic Festival
Silver medal – second place	2024 Skopje	K1

Max Steinbrenner (born 1 June 2009) is an Austrian slalom canoeist who has competed at the international level since 2024, specializing in K1 and kayak cross.

He won a bronze medal in the K1 team event at the 2026 ICF Canoe Slalom World Championships in Oklahoma City.
