= Dimitri Marx =

Swiss canoeist (born 1998)

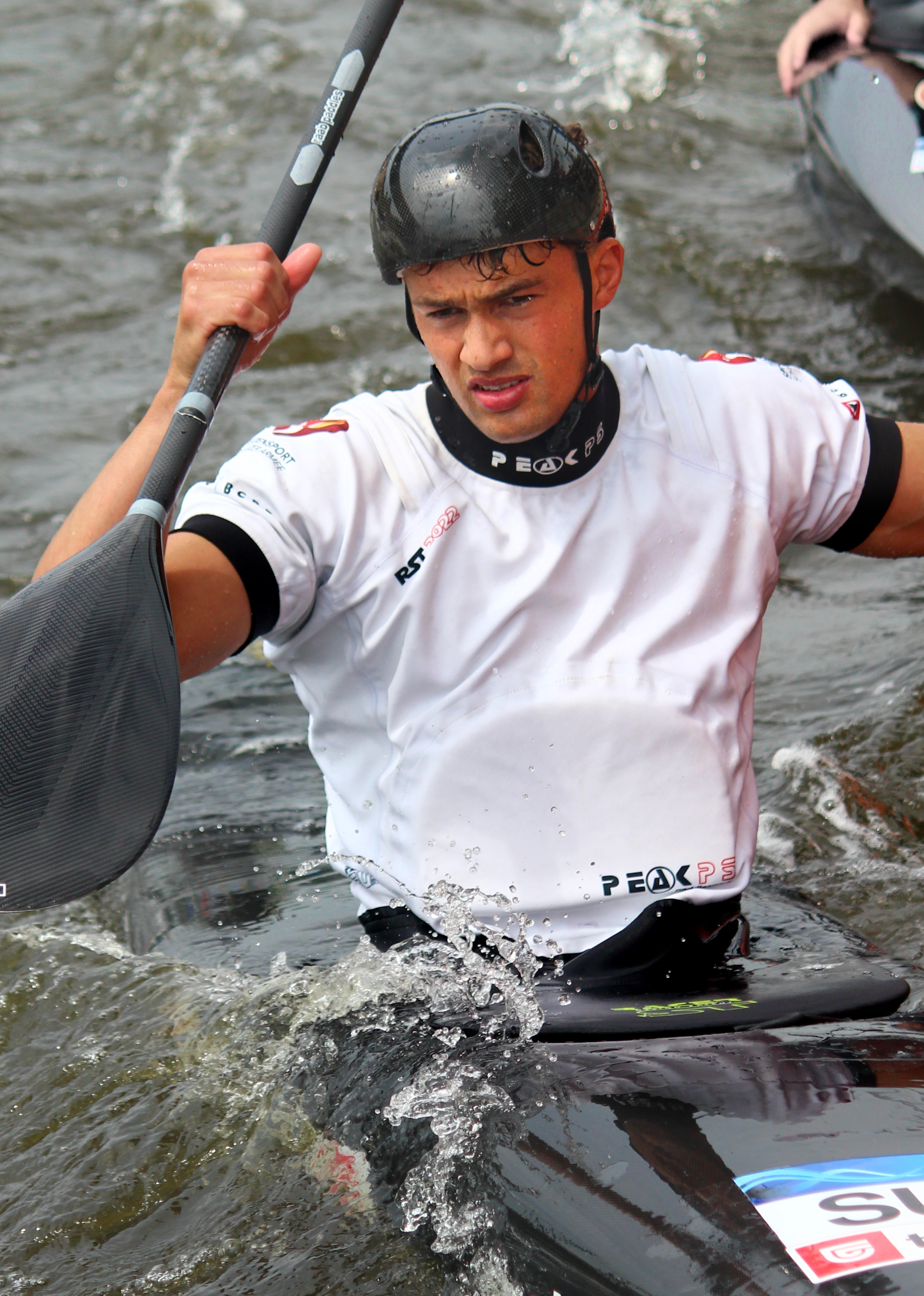
- Marx in 2023

Personal information
- Nationality: Swiss
- Born: 8 October 1998 (age 27)
- Height: 191 cm (6 ft 3 in)
- Weight: 86 kg (190 lb)

Sport
- Country: Switzerland
- Sport: Canoe slalom
- Event: K1, Kayak cross
Medal record
Men's Canoe slalom
Representing Switzerland
Event	1st	2nd	3rd
World Championships	0	1	0
European Championships	0	1	1
U23 World Championships	2	0	0
U23 European Championships	0	1	1
Total	2	3	2
World Championships
Silver medal – second place	2026 Oklahoma City	Kayak cross
European Championships
Silver medal – second place	2021 Ivrea	Kayak cross
Bronze medal – third place	2020 Prague	K1 team
U23 World Championships
Gold medal – first place	2018 Ivrea	Kayak cross
Gold medal – first place	2021 Tacen	Kayak cross
U23 European Championships
Silver medal – second place	2021 Solkan	Kayak cross
Bronze medal – third place	2018 Bratislava	K1 team

Dimitri Marx (born 8 October 1998) is a Swiss slalom canoeist who has competed at the international level since 2015, specializing in K1 and kayak cross.

== Career ==
Marx competed at the 2020 European Canoe Slalom Championships and won a bronze medal in the K1 team event. He again competed at the 2021 European Canoe Slalom Championships and won a silver medal in the kayak cross event.

In July 2026, he competed at the 2026 ICF Canoe Slalom World Championships and won a silver medal in the kayak cross event.

=== World Cup individual podiums ===
Season	Date	Venue	Position	Event
2018	24 June 2018	Liptovský Mikuláš	3rd	Kayak cross
2023	11 June 2023	Prague	1st	Kayak cross
2024	2 June 2024	Augsburg	2nd	Kayak cross

== Personal life ==
Marx's sister, Alena, is also a slalom canoeist.
