= Vít Přindiš =

Czech canoeist (born 1989)

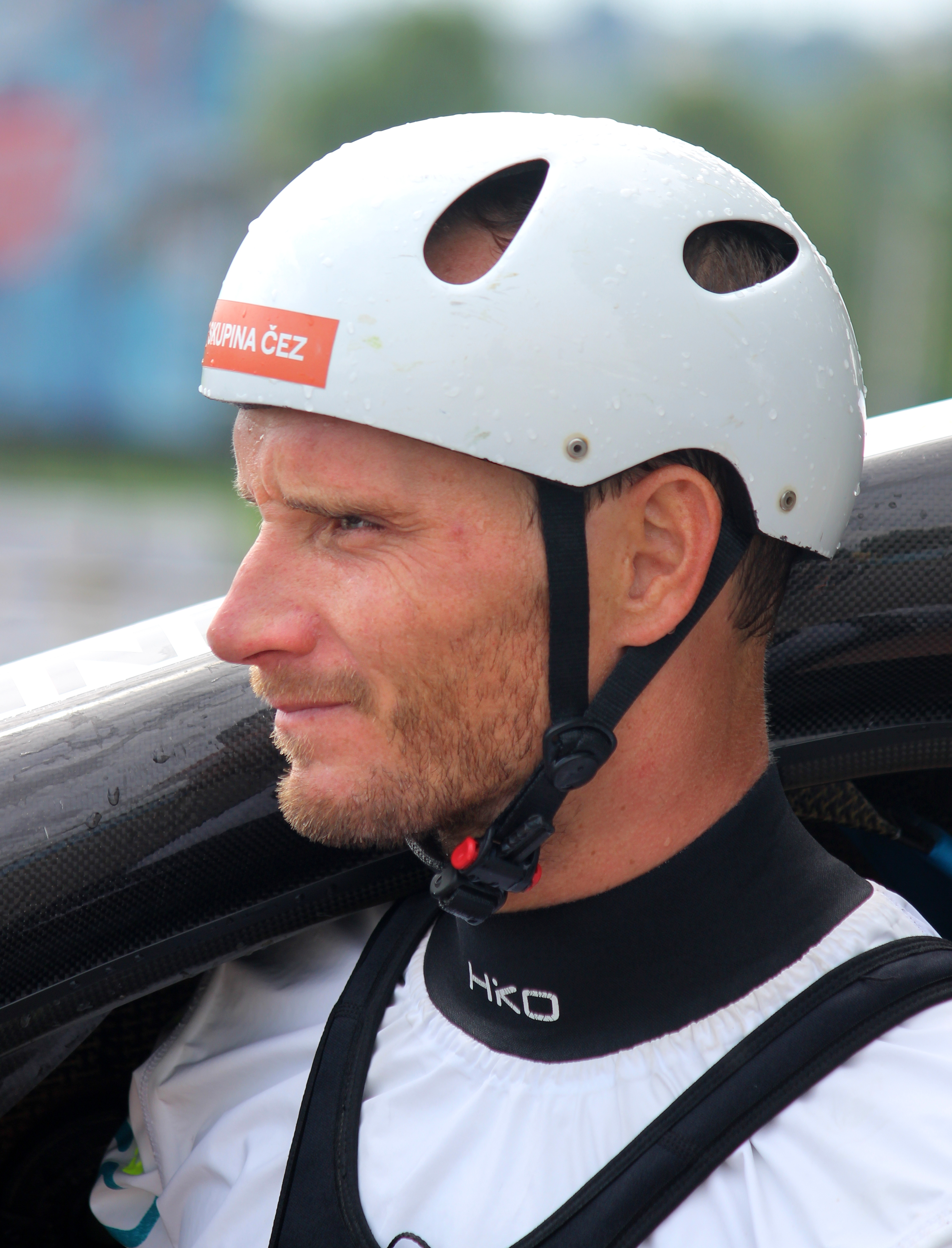
- Přindiš in 2023

Personal information
- Nationality: Czech
- Born: 14 April 1989 (age 37) Prague, Czech Republic

Sport
- Country: Czech Republic
- Sport: Canoe slalom
- Event: K1, Kayak cross

Achievements and titles
- Highest world ranking: No. 1 (2017-18, K1)
Medal record
Men's canoe slalom
Representing the Czech Republic
World Championships
Gold medal – first place	2017 Pau	K1 team
Gold medal – first place	2022 Augsburg	K1
Gold medal – first place	2023 London	K1 team
Gold medal – first place	2026 Oklahoma City	Kayak cross
Silver medal – second place	2014 Deep Creek Lake	K1 team
Silver medal – second place	2017 Pau	K1
Silver medal – second place	2019 La Seu d'Urgell	K1 team
Bronze medal – third place	2018 Rio de Janeiro	K1 team
European Games
Bronze medal – third place	2023 Kraków	Kayak cross
European Championships
Gold medal – first place	2013 Kraków	K1 team
Gold medal – first place	2016 Liptovský Mikuláš	K1 team
Gold medal – first place	2017 Tacen	K1 team
Gold medal – first place	2018 Prague	K1 team
Gold medal – first place	2019 Pau	K1
Gold medal – first place	2019 Pau	K1 team
Gold medal – first place	2021 Ivrea	K1
Gold medal – first place	2021 Ivrea	K1 team
Gold medal – first place	2021 Ivrea	Kayak cross
Gold medal – first place	2022 Liptovský Mikuláš	K1 team
Gold medal – first place	2024 Tacen	Kayak cross individual
Gold medal – first place	2024 Tacen	K1 team
Silver medal – second place	2014 Vienna	K1
Silver medal – second place	2018 Prague	K1
Silver medal – second place	2020 Prague	K1 team
U23 World Championships
Bronze medal – third place	2012 Wausau	K1 team
U23 European Championships
Gold medal – first place	2011 Banja Luka	K1 team
Silver medal – second place	2012 Solkan	K1 team
Junior World Championships
Silver medal – second place	2006 Solkan	K1 team
Junior European Championships
Silver medal – second place	2005 Kraków	K1 team
Silver medal – second place	2006 Nottingham	K1 team
Bronze medal – third place	2007 Kraków	K1 team

Vít Přindiš (born 14 April 1989) is a Czech slalom canoeist who has competed at the international level since 2005.

He won eight medals at the ICF Canoe Slalom World Championships with four golds (K1: 2022; Kayak cross: 2026; K1 team: 2017, 2023), three silvers (K1: 2017, K1 team: 2014, 2019) and a bronze (K1 team: 2018).

He also won 16 medals (12 golds, 3 silvers and 1 bronze) at the European Canoe Slalom Championships, including a bronze medal in kayak cross at the 2023 European Games in Kraków.

Přindiš won the overall World Cup title in the K1 class in 2017, 2021 and 2023 and in Kayak cross in 2021. He finished the 2017 and 2018 seasons as the World No. 1 in the K1 event.

His father Pavel is a former slalom canoeist and a medalist from World Championships.

== World Cup individual podiums ==
	1st place, gold medalist(s)	2nd place, silver medalist(s)	3rd place, bronze medalist(s)	Total
K1	8	6	2	16
Kayak cross	1	5	0	6
Total	9	11	2	22

Season	Date	Venue	Position	Event
2014	7 June 2014	Lee Valley	2nd	K1
2016	11 June 2016	La Seu d'Urgell	1st	K1
2017	17 June 2017	Prague	1st	K1
2017	24 June 2017	Augsburg	1st	K1
2017	2 September 2017	Ivrea	1st	K1
2019	1 September 2019	Markkleeberg	1st	K1
2019	8 September 2019	Prague	2nd	K1
2021	13 June 2021	Prague	1st	Kayak cross
2021	20 June 2021	Markkleeberg	2nd	Kayak cross
2021	4 September 2021	La Seu d'Urgell	1st	K1
2021	11 September 2021	Pau	1st	K1
2021	12 September 2021	Pau	2nd	Kayak cross
2022	18 June 2022	Kraków	1st	K1
2022	26 June 2022	Tacen	2nd	Kayak cross
2022	3 September 2022	La Seu d'Urgell	3rd	K1
2023	9 June 2023	Prague	2nd	K1
2023	17 June 2023	Tacen	2nd	K1
2023	2 September 2023	La Seu d'Urgell	3rd	K1
2023	7 October 2023	Vaires-sur-Marne	2nd	K1
2024	14 June 2024	Kraków	2nd	K1
2024	16 June 2024	Kraków	2nd	Kayak cross
2026	7 June 2026	Prague	2nd	Kayak cross
