= Michał Pasiut =

Polish canoeist (born 1991)

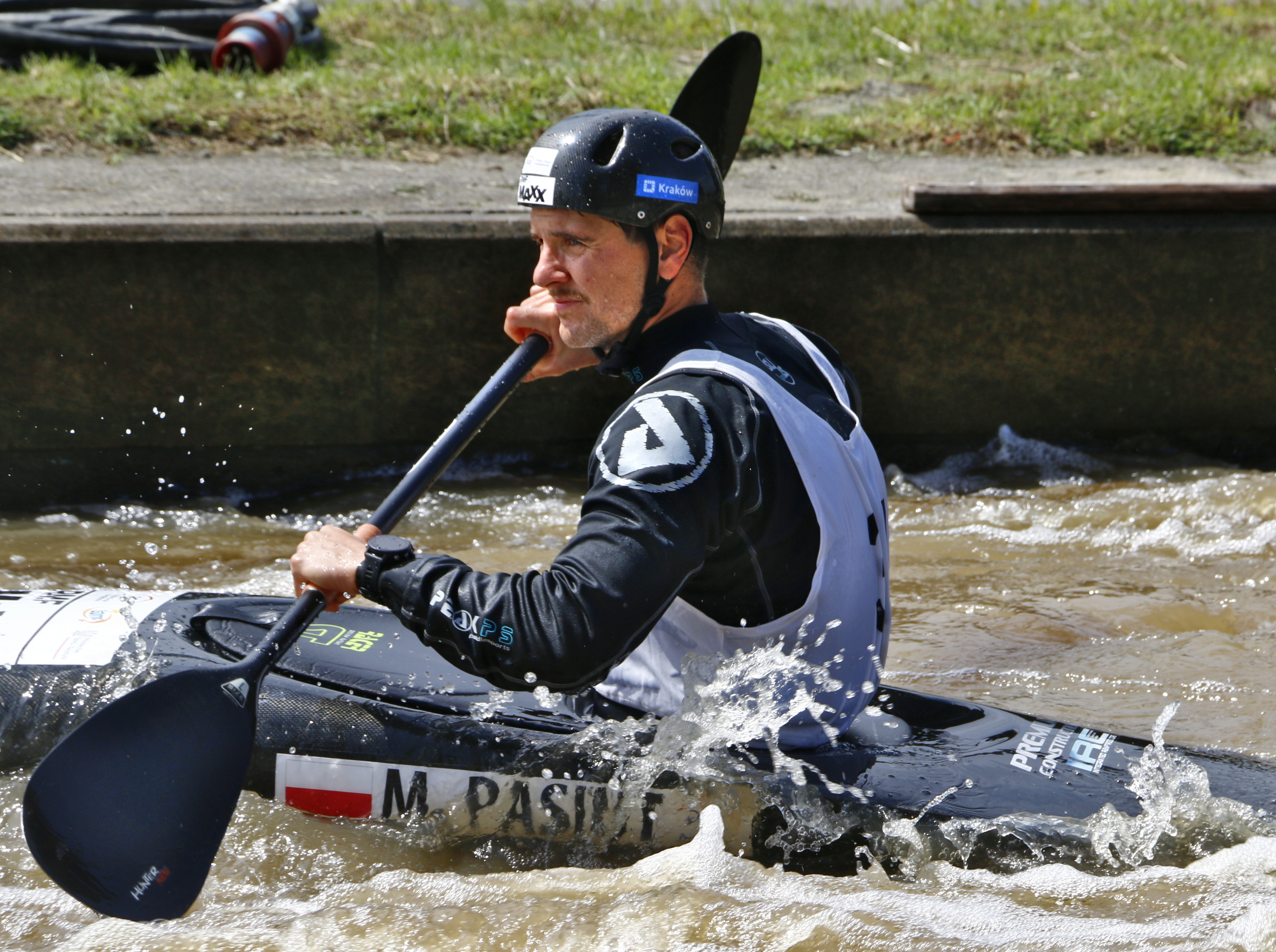

Personal information
- Nationality: Polish
- Born: 29 June 1991 (age 35) Nowy Sącz, Poland

Sport
- Country: Poland
- Sport: Canoe slalom
- Event: K1
- Club: AZS AWF Kraków
Medal record
Men's canoe slalom
Representing Poland
World Championships
Silver medal – second place	2018 Rio de Janeiro	K1 team
Silver medal – second place	2026 Oklahoma City	K1
Bronze medal – third place	2019 La Seu d'Urgell	K1 team
Bronze medal – third place	2023 London	K1 team
European Games
Silver medal – second place	2023 Kraków	K1 team
European Championships
Silver medal – second place	2018 Prague	K1 team
Silver medal – second place	2022 Liptovský Mikuláš	K1 team
U23 World Championships
Gold medal – first place	2014 Penrith	K1 team
U23 European Championships
Gold medal – first place	2014 Skopje	K1 team
Silver medal – second place	2010 Markkleeberg	K1 team
Bronze medal – third place	2013 Bourg St. Maurice	K1 team
Junior World Championships
Silver medal – second place	2008 Roudnice nad Labem	K1 team
Junior European Championships
Gold medal – first place	2008 Solkan	K1 team
Silver medal – second place	2009 Liptovský Mikuláš	K1

Michał Pasiut (born 29 June 1991) is a Polish slalom canoeist who has competed at the international level since 2008.

He won four medals in the at the ICF Canoe Slalom World Championships with two silvers (K1: 2026, K1 team: 2018) and two bronzes (K1 team: 2019, 2023).

He also won three silver medals in the same event at the European Championships, including one at the 2023 European Games in Kraków.

== World Cup individual podiums ==
Season	Date	Venue	Position	Event
2019	23 June 2019	Bratislava	2nd	K1
2026	29 May 2026	Tacen	2nd	K1
