= 2026 ICF Canoe Slalom World Championships =

Canoe slalom event in Oklahoma City

2026 World Championships
- Venue: RIVERSPORT OKC
- Location: Oklahoma City, Oklahoma, United States
- Dates: July 20–25

The 2026 ICF Canoe Slalom World Championships took place from July 20 to 25, 2026 in Oklahoma City, Oklahoma, United States under the auspices of International Canoe Federation (ICF). It was the 45th edition and the events were held at RIVERSPORT OKC, the site of the 2028 Summer Olympics. Oklahoma City was hosting the championships for the first time.

It was also the first of nine stages in the qualification for the 2028 Summer Olympics.

256 athletes from 50 countries participated at the event.

== Schedule ==
Twelve medal events were contested.

All times listed are UTC−5.

Date	Time	Events
July 20	09:34	Men's kayak cross individual
July 20	11:06	Women's kayak cross individual
July 21	09:06	K1W heats
July 21	10:44	K1M heats
July 21	14:36	K1W teams
July 21	15:13	K1M teams
July 22	10:06	C1M heats
July 22	11:56	C1W heats
July 22	14:36	C1M teams
July 22	15:21	C1W teams
July 23	10:06	K1W semifinals
July 23	11:11	K1M semifinals
July 23	14:06	K1W final
July 23	14:45	K1M final
July 24	10:06	C1M semifinals
July 24	11:11	C1W semifinals
July 24	14:06	C1M final
July 24	14:45	C1W final

Date	Time	Events
July 25	10:04	Women's kayak cross round 1
July 25	10:40	Men's kayak cross round 1
July 25	11:21	Women's kayak cross repechage
July 25	11:41	Men's kayak cross repechage
July 25	13:34	Women's kayak cross heats
July 25	14:04	Men's kayak cross heats
July 25	15:05	Women's kayak cross quarterfinals
July 25	15:23	Men's kayak cross quarterfinals
July 25	15:44	Women's kayak cross semifinals
July 25	15:53	Men's kayak cross semifinals
July 25	16:08	Women's kayak cross small final
July 25	16:13	Men's kayak cross small final
July 25	16:20	Women's kayak cross final
July 25	16:27	Men's kayak cross final

== Medal summary ==
=== Medal table ===
* Host nation (United States)

Rank	Nation	Gold	Silver	Bronze	Total
1	Czech Republic	3	3	1	7
2	Australia	3	1	0	4
3	Great Britain	2	1	3	6
4	Switzerland	1	2	0	3
5	Spain	1	0	2	3
6	Slovakia	1	0	1	2
7	Slovenia	1	0	0	1
8	France	0	2	1	3
9	Poland	0	1	1	2
10	Andorra	0	1	0	1
10	United States*	0	1	0	1
12	Austria	0	0	1	1
12	Germany	0	0	1	1
12	Italy	0	0	1	1
Totals (14 entries)		12	12	12	36

=== Men ===
==== Canoe ====
Event	Gold		Silver		Bronze	
C1	Miquel Travé; Spain	88.28	Adam Burgess; Great Britain	89.77	Lukáš Kratochvíl; Czech Republic	89.89
C1 team	Great Britain; Ryan Westley; Adam Burgess; Peter Linksted	93.18	France; Nicolas Gestin; Yohann Senechault; Jules Bernardet	93.54	Germany; Lennard Tuchscherer; Timo Trummer; Sideris Tasiadis	95.60

==== Kayak ====
Event	Gold		Silver		Bronze	
K1	Jakub Krejčí; Czech Republic	83.65	Michał Pasiut; Poland	84.34	Giovanni De Gennaro; Italy	85.27
K1 team	Slovenia; Žiga Lin Hočevar; Lan Tominc; Peter Kauzer	89.60	Switzerland; Martin Dougoud; Jan Rohrer; Gelindo Chiarello	89.71	Austria; Felix Oschmautz; Mario Leitner; Max Steinbrenner	90.78
Kayak cross	Vít Přindiš; Czech Republic		Dimitri Marx; Switzerland		Sam Leaver; Great Britain	
Kayak cross individual	Joseph Clarke; Great Britain	46.54	Jakub Krejčí; Czech Republic	46.70	David Llorente; Spain	46.98

=== Women ===
==== Canoe ====
Event	Gold		Silver		Bronze	
C1	Tereza Kneblová; Czech Republic	100.52	Mònica Dòria; Andorra	103.04	Klaudia Zwolińska; Poland	103.21
C1 team	Slovakia; Zuzana Paňková; Soňa Stanovská; Emanuela Luknárová	105.16	Czech Republic; Tereza Kneblová; Martina Satková; Adriana Morenová	105.39	France; Angèle Hug; Doriane Delassus; Marjorie Delassus	105.81

==== Kayak ====
Event	Gold		Silver		Bronze	
K1	Jessica Fox; Australia	92.06	Evy Leibfarth; United States	93.37	Kimberley Woods; Great Britain	94.91
K1 team	Australia; Kate Eckhardt; Jessica Fox; Noemie Fox	97.87	France; Emma Vuitton; Camille Prigent; Marjorie Delassus	98.51	Slovakia; Eliška Mintálová; Soňa Stanovská; Zuzana Paňková	100.72
Kayak cross	Alena Marx; Switzerland		Noemie Fox; Australia		Miren Lazkano; Spain	
Kayak cross individual	Jessica Fox; Australia	51.05	Kateřina Beková; Czech Republic	51.08	Lois Leaver; Great Britain	51.17
