= Jan Rohrer =

Swiss slalom canoeist (born 2000)

Personal information
- Nationality: Swiss
- Born: 12 December 2000 (age 25)

Sport
- Country: Switzerland
- Sport: Canoe slalom
- Event: K1, Kayak cross
Medal record
Men's canoe slalom
Representing Switzerland
World Championships
Silver medal – second place	2026 Oklahoma City	K1 team
European Championships
Gold medal – first place	2022 Liptovský Mikuláš	Kayak cross
Silver medal – second place	2024 Tacen	Kayak cross
U23 World Championships
Silver medal – second place	2021 Tacen	Kayak cross
Bronze medal – third place	2022 Ivrea	Kayak cross
Junior World Championships
Gold medal – first place	2018 Ivrea	Kayak cross

Jan Rohrer (born 12 December 2000) is a Swiss slalom canoeist who has competed at the international level since 2016, specializing in K1 and kayak cross.

He won a silver medal in the K1 team event at the 2026 ICF Canoe Slalom World Championships in Oklahoma City.

He also won one gold and one silver medal in kayak cross at the European Championships.

Rohrer won the overall World Cup title in kayak cross in 2026.

== World Cup individual podiums ==
Season	Date	Venue	Position	Event
2023	11 June 2023	Prague	2nd	Kayak cross
2023	3 September 2023	La Seu d'Urgell	1st	Kayak cross
2025	8 June 2025	La Seu d'Urgell	2nd	Kayak cross individual
2025	8 June 2025	La Seu d'Urgell	3rd	Kayak cross
2026	13 September 2026	La Seu d'Urgell	3rd	Kayak cross
