= Giovanni De Gennaro (canoeist) =

Italian slalom canoeist (born 1992)

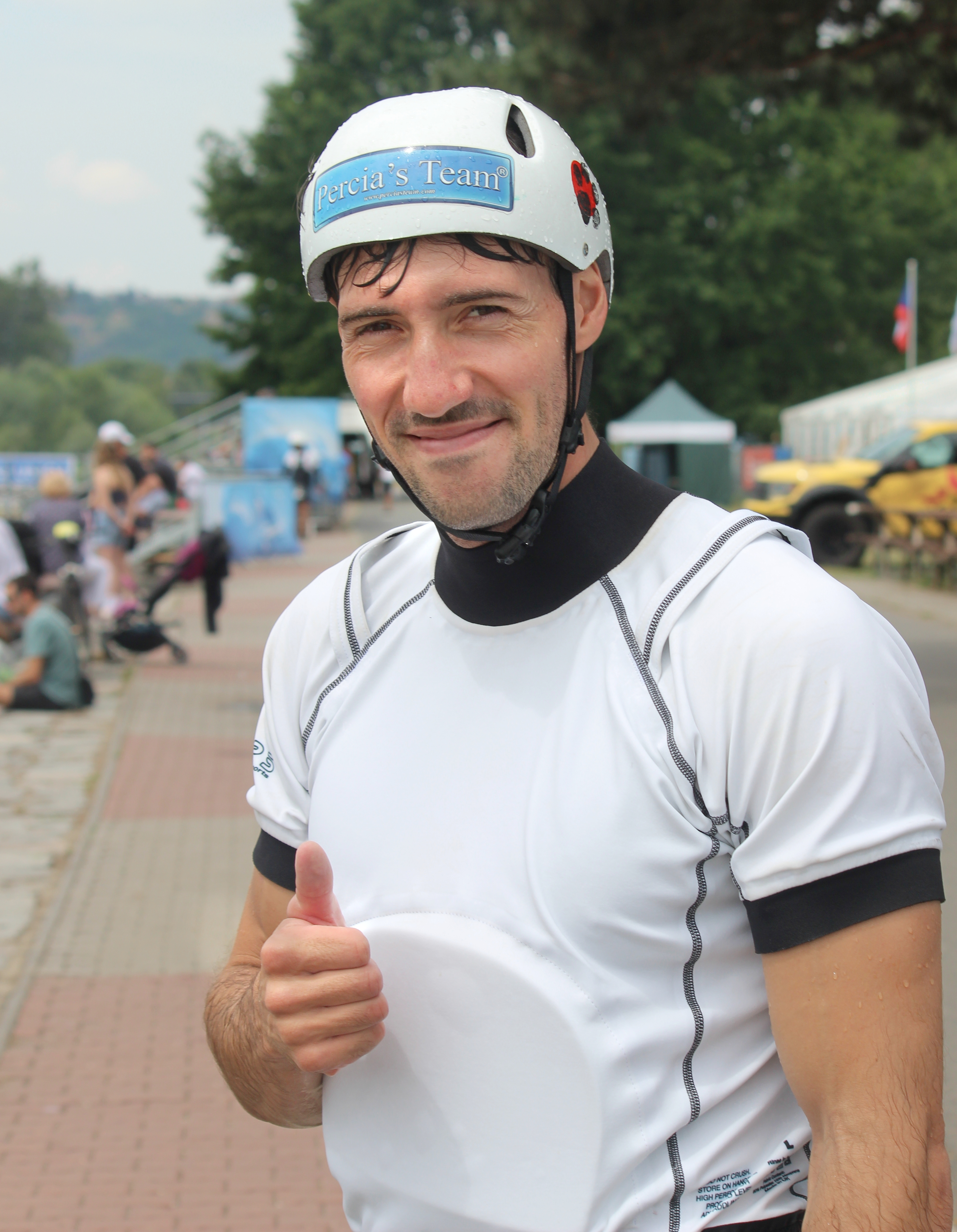
- De Gennaro in 2023

Personal information
- Born: 21 July 1992 (age 34) Brescia, Italy

Sport
- Country: Italy
- Sport: Canoe slalom
- Event: K1, Kayak cross
- Club: C.S. Carabinieri
Medal record
Men's canoe slalom
Representing Italy
Event	1st	2nd	3rd
Olympic Games	1	0	0
World Championships	1	1	2
European Championships	2	2	2
U23 World Championships	1	1	1
U23 European Championships	0	0	4
Junior World Championships	1	0	0
Junior European Championships	1	0	1
Total	7	4	10
Olympic Games
Gold medal – first place	2024 Paris	K1
World Championships
Gold medal – first place	2013 Prague	K1 team
Silver medal – second place	2022 Augsburg	K1
Bronze medal – third place	2011 Bratislava	K1 team
Bronze medal – third place	2026 Oklahoma City	K1
European Championships
Gold medal – first place	2024 Tacen	K1
Gold medal – first place	2026 Ivrea	Kayak cross individual
Silver medal – second place	2021 Ivrea	K1
Silver medal – second place	2022 Liptovský Mikuláš	K1
Bronze medal – third place	2015 Markkleeberg	K1 team
Bronze medal – third place	2026 Ivrea	K1
U23 World Championships
Gold medal – first place	2012 Wausau	K1 team
Silver medal – second place	2014 Penrith	K1
Bronze medal – third place	2013 Liptovský Mikuláš	K1
U23 European Championships
Bronze medal – third place	2011 Banja Luka	K1 team
Bronze medal – third place	2013 Bourg-Saint-Maurice	K1
Bronze medal – third place	2014 Skopje	K1 team
Bronze medal – third place	2015 Kraków	K1 team
Junior World Championships
Gold medal – first place	2010 Foix	K1
Junior European Championships
Gold medal – first place	2009 Liptovský Mikuláš	K1 team
Bronze medal – third place	2010 Markkleeberg	K1 team

Giovanni De Gennaro (born 21 July 1992) is an Italian slalom canoeist who has competed at the international level since 2008, specializing in K1 and kayak cross. He is a three time Olympian and an Olympic champion in the K1 event from the 2024 Summer Olympics.

== Career ==
De Gennaro has competed at three Olympic Games. In his first Olympic participation he finished 7th in the K1 event at the 2016 Summer Olympics in Rio de Janeiro. He then finished 14th in the K1 event at the delayed 2020 Summer Olympics in Tokyo after being eliminated in the semifinal. He then went on to win the gold medal in the K1 event at the 2024 Summer Olympics in Paris, where he also finished 13th in kayak cross.

De Gennaro won four medals at the ICF Canoe Slalom World Championships with a gold (K1 team: 2013) a silver (K1: 2022) and two bronzes (K1: 2026, K1 team: 2011).

He also won six medals (2 golds, 2 silvers and 2 bronzes) at the European Championships.

== Personal life ==
De Gennaro lives in Roncadelle (Brescia) and he was a member of Corpo Forestale dello Stato, now Carabinieri. His brother Riccardo is a former slalom canoeist. Slalom canoeist Stefanie Horn is Giovanni's sister-in-law.

== World Cup individual podiums ==
	1st place, gold medalist(s)	2nd place, silver medalist(s)	3rd place, bronze medalist(s)	Total
K1	7	3	4	14
Kayak cross	0	1	0	1
Kayak cross individual	1	0	1	2
Total	8	4	5	17

Season	Date	Venue	Position	Event
2016	4 Jun 2016	Ivrea	1st	K1
2017	1 Jul 2017	Markkleeberg	1st	K1
2018	9 Sep 2018	La Seu d'Urgell	1st	K1
2019	30 June 2019	Tacen	1st	K1
2021	12 June 2021	Prague	2nd	K1
2022	11 June 2022	Prague	2nd	K1
2022	28 August 2022	Pau	2nd	Kayak cross
2023	2 June 2023	Augsburg	1st	K1
2023	9 June 2023	Prague	3rd	K1
2024	7 June 2024	Prague	1st	K1
2024	20 September 2024	La Seu d'Urgell	3rd	K1
2025	28 June 2025	Prague	3rd	K1
2026	7 June 2026	Prague	1st	Kayak cross individual
2026	12 June 2026	Augsburg	2nd	K1
2026	14 June 2026	Augsburg	3rd	Kayak cross individual
2026	3 September 2026	Vaires-sur-Marne	1st	K1
2026	11 September 2026	La Seu d'Urgell	3rd	K1
