= Boathouse District =

Area of Oklahoma City, United States

Coordinates: 35.457924°N 97.502494°W

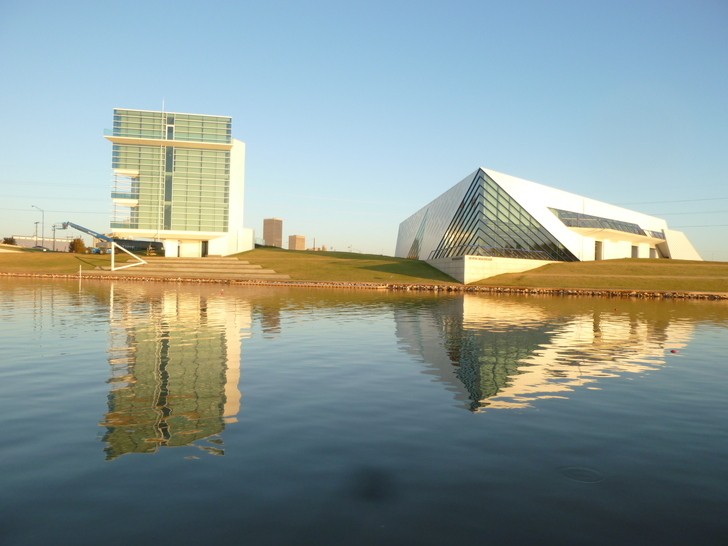
National Headquarters and National High Performance Center

The Boathouse District is a row of boathouses and attractions along the Oklahoma River in Oklahoma City. The Boathouse District offers activities such as recreational and elite rowing and kayaking, fitness facilities, private event spaces and RIVERSPORT Adventures, an outdoor adventure park. The Oklahoma City Boathouse Foundation, which manages the Boathouse District, has been named a U.S. Olympic & Paralympic Training Site by the U.S. Olympic Committee.

== History ==
The development of the Boathouse District began in the early 1990s as part of the revitalization of a seven-mile stretch of the North Canadian River, later renamed the Oklahoma River, that runs through Oklahoma City. As rowing gained popularity locally on Lake Overholser, Mike and Tempe Knopp of the Oklahoma Association for Rowing identified the Oklahoma River as a suitable site for competitive rowing due to its length and layout. The organization initiated a grassroots effort to establish a permanent rowing facility along the river.

The project gained financial backing from local business leaders, including Aubrey McClendon and Clay Bennett, who helped secure funding for the construction of the district’s first major facility. The Chesapeake Boathouse, completed in 2006, was the first structure built as part of the river’s redevelopment. Additional facilities followed, including the Devon Boathouse in 2010, the Chesapeake Finish Line Tower in 2011, and the CHK|Central Boathouse in 2015.

== Chesapeake Boathouse ==
The Chesapeake Boathouse, built in 2006, was the first structure on the newly revitalized Oklahoma River. Today it anchors the Boathouse District and serves as the community boathouse on the river.

The design is the vision of Oklahoma City architect Rand Elliott with primary funding for the project provided by Chesapeake Energy Corporation.

The design of the Chesapeake Boathouse represents a sleek rowing shell with translucent polycarbonate walls offering a dramatic nighttime image of the building “floating” above the river. Sixteen columns of light representing oars highlight the reflecting pool at the “bow” of the building. Features of the $3.5 million facility include:

- Deck, lobby, and event room for receptions and meetings
- Boat bays to store up to 124 rowing shells
- A panoramic 24-ft. wall of glass overlooking the deck, river, and reflecting pool
- Event room with a 62-foot window revealing the boat bays
- Fully equipped fitness/training room overlooking the river

== Devon Boathouse ==
The Devon Boathouse is the home of Oklahoma City University Rowing and Canoe/Kayak and headquarters for the OKC National High Performance Center. The OKC National High Performance Center provides training opportunities for Olympic hopefuls in both rowing and canoe/kayak.

Rand Elliott, of Elliott & Associates Architects, designed the Devon Boathouse for OCU. The structure is one in a series of iconic boathouses in the Boathouse District in Oklahoma City The architecture presents a striking image against the backdrop of Oklahoma City's downtown skyline, creating the impression of the boathouse's "prow" breaking the river's edge.

Soaring spaces created by glass and polycarbonate walls are flooded with natural light and include a two-story boat bay and the Ann Lacy Event Center. Expansive windows offer unobstructed views of the Oklahoma River and a second story balcony overlooks the boat bay ramps and docks. Blue LED lights accent the exterior of the boathouse at night, adding to the dramatic images of the Chesapeake Boathouse and OGE Together Lightscape on the river.

== Chesapeake Finish Line Tower ==
The Chesapeake Finish Line Tower was designed by Oklahoma architect Rand Elliott. The 60 foot tower is clearly visible from Interstate 35. The 7,500 square foot building has four levels. These include a welcome center, finish line jury/timing seats, commentary/media/race control and a VIP Viewing Gallery and observation deck.

The Chesapeake Finish Line Tower has the newest in race technology and meets the standards for both FISA, the international governing body for rowing, and the International Canoe Federation. The finish line for the Oklahoma River is attached to the tower itself and is graphically represented on nearby sidewalks and inside the building as a continuous red line. Outside, terraced seating is provided for spectators to have an outdoor view of the finish line.

== CHK|Central Boathouse ==
The CHK|Central Boathouse serves as home to the University of Central Oklahoma's women's rowing team. It also includes a live music venue and an art gallery, establishing it as a unique presence “where art meets the river” in the Boathouse District at the Oklahoma River. The CHK|Central Boathouse opened in April 2015 and is the newest boathouse in the Boathouse District.

== OU Boathouse ==
Plans for the University of Oklahoma Boathouse, home to the OU Women's NCAA Division I program, are underway. The facility has received $2 million in funding as part of a $12.5 million donation to support OU academics and athletics from Aubrey and Kathleen McClendon.

== RIVERSPORT Rapids ==
RIVERSPORT Rapids is a non-profit recreational and athletic training whitewater and rafting center. The $45.6 million project is fully funded by MAPS 3, a temporary voter-approved sales tax increase. The venue will host the canoe slalom competition during the 2028 Summer Olympics.

== RIVERSPORT Adventures ==
RIVERSPORT Adventures is a non-profit outdoor adventure park in Oklahoma City. It is home to the SandRidge Sky Zip, Sky Trail, Slide and Rumble Drop, along with recreational kayaking, stand up paddle boarding and many other adventures.

== Role in Urban Renewal ==
The Boathouse District developed as part of broader redevelopment efforts along the Oklahoma River in Oklahoma City. Beginning in the 1990s, city leaders pursued river improvements through a series of public initiatives designed to stimulate economic growth, expand recreational access, and reposition the city as a destination for rowing and paddlesports. Improvements to the river, including the installation of low-water dams and infrastructure upgrades, transformed the formerly industrial waterway into a regulated rowing course suitable for national and international competition.

The district has been closely associated with the city’s Metropolitan Area Projects (MAPS) programs, which funded public infrastructure and quality-of-life developments intended to encourage private investment. The construction of architecturally distinctive boathouses along the riverfront formed a visible component of this strategy. Supporters have described the district as a catalyst for tourism, youth sports development, and regional economic activity.

== Architectural Significance ==
The boathouses within the district were designed by internationally recognized architects and firms, contributing to its reputation for contemporary design. Facilities such as the Devon Boathouse and Chesapeake Boathouse incorporate modern materials, dramatic structural forms, and river-facing observation areas. Architectural commentators have noted the contrast between the sleek, sculptural forms of the buildings and the previously industrial character of the river corridor.

The concentration of high-profile architectural projects along a single stretch of riverfront has drawn national attention and professional awards, positioning the district as a case study in sports-centered civic architecture.

== Ecological and Recreation Impact ==
Redevelopment of the Oklahoma River corridor included shoreline stabilization, trail construction, and landscaping improvements. The district connects to multi-use trails and public recreation spaces, expanding access for residents beyond competitive rowing. In addition to elite training programs, the area supports youth rowing leagues, community paddling events, and outdoor festivals.

The Boathouse District was designated an official U.S. Olympic and Paralympic Training Site by the United States Olympic & Paralympic Committee, further elevating its profile in competitive rowing and canoe/kayak. The river has hosted national championships and international regattas, contributing to sports tourism in the region.
