= Felix Oschmautz =

Austrian slalom canoeist (born 1999)

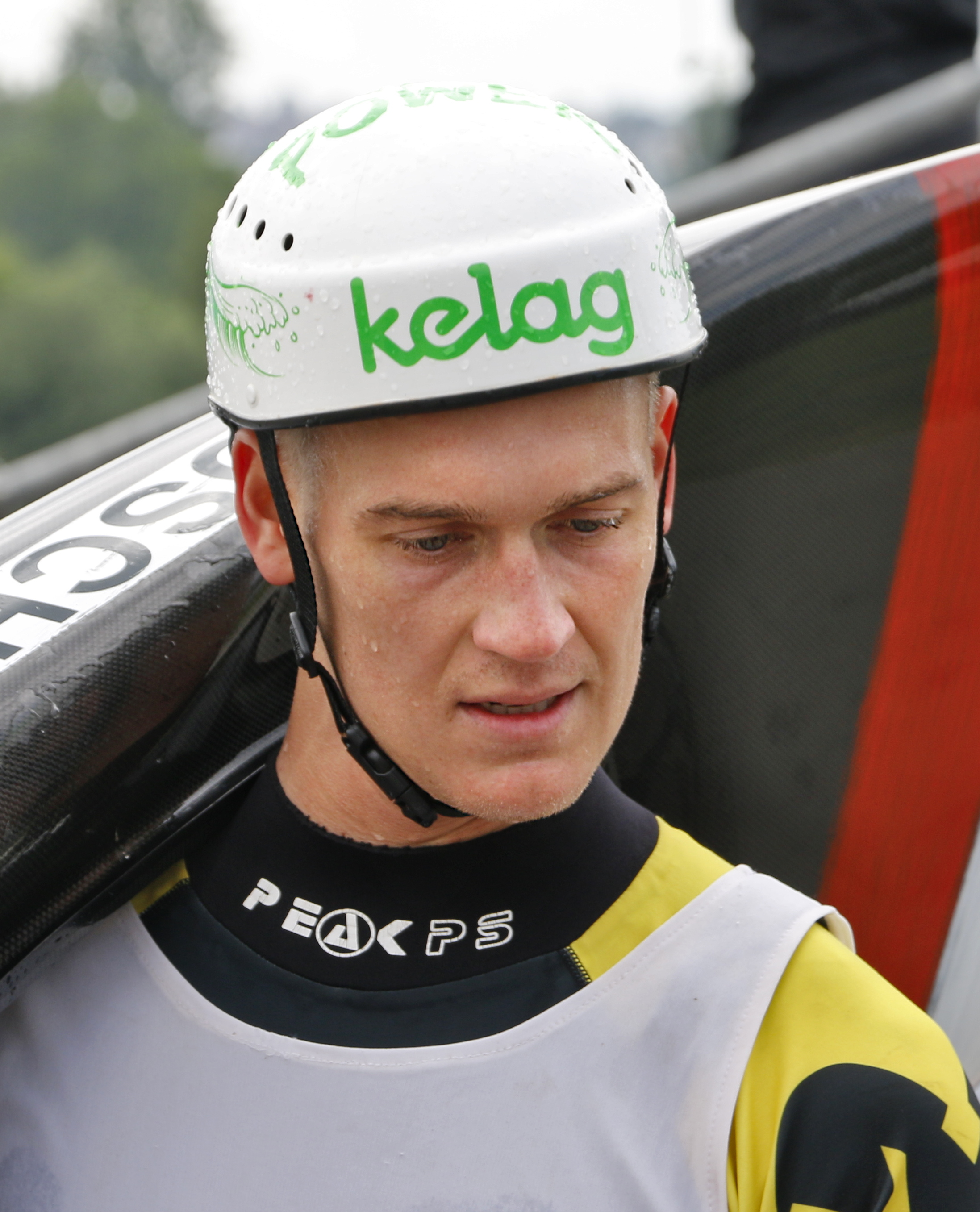

Personal information
- Nationality: Austrian
- Born: 18 July 1999 (age 27) Maria Saal, Austria

Sport
- Country: Austrian
- Sport: Canoe slalom
- Event: K1, Kayak cross
Medal record
Men's canoe slalom
Representing Austria
World Championships
Bronze medal – third place	2026 Oklahoma City	K1 team
European Games
Silver medal – second place	2023 Kraków	Kayak cross
European Championships
Silver medal – second place	2024 Tacen	K1 team
Bronze medal – third place	2022 Liptovský Mikuláš	K1
Bronze medal – third place	2022 Liptovský Mikuláš	Kayak cross
U23 World Championships
Silver medal – second place	2022 Ivrea	K1
Bronze medal – third place	2018 Ivrea	K1 team
U23 European Championships
Silver medal – second place	2019 Liptovský Mikuláš	K1 team
Bronze medal – third place	2017 Hohenlimburg	K1 team
Junior World Championships
Gold medal – first place	2017 Bratislava	K1
Silver medal – second place	2016 Kraków	K1
Junior European Championships
Silver medal – second place	2016 Solkan	K1

Felix Oschmautz (born 18 July 1999) is an Austrian slalom canoeist who has competed at the international level since 2014, specializing in K1 and kayak cross.

He won a bronze medal in the K1 team event at the 2026 ICF Canoe Slalom World Championships in Oklahoma City.

Oschmautz won four medals (2 golds and 2 silvers) at the European Championships, including a silver medal in kayak cross at the 2023 European Games in Kraków.

He represented Austria at the delayed 2020 Summer Olympics in Tokyo, finishing fourth in the K1 event. He also competed at the 2024 Summer Olympics in Paris, finishing 10th in the K1 event and 17th in kayak cross.

He has won four medals at the ICF World Junior and U23 Canoe Slalom Championships with a gold (2017) and a silver (2016) in the Junior K1 event, a silver in the U23 K1 event (2022) and a bronze (2018) in the U23 K1 team event.

== Results ==
=== World Cup individual podiums ===
Season	Date	Venue	Position	Event
2021	19 June 2021	Markkleeberg	2nd	K1
2021	4 September 2021	La Seu d'Urgell	2nd	K1
2023	17 June 2023	Tacen	3rd	K1
2023	8 October 2023	Vaires-sur-Marne	3rd	Kayak cross
2024	31 May 2024	Augsburg	1st	K1

=== Complete World Cup results ===
Year	WC1	WC2	WC3	WC4	WC5	Points	Position
2015	Prague (Czech Republic); 55	Kraków (Poland)	Liptovský Mikuláš (Slovakia); 31	La Seu (Spain); 78	Pau (France); 44	20	61st
2016	Ivrea (Italy); 40	La Seu (Spain); 33	Pau (France); 57	Prague (Czech Republic); 24	Tacen (Slovenia); 12	106	23rd
2017	Prague (Czech Republic); 28	Augsburg (Germany)	Markkleeberg (Germany); 29	Ivrea (Italy); 40	La Seu (Spain); 30	68	40th
2018	Liptovský Mikuláš (Slovakia); 17	Kraków (Poland); 15	Augsburg (Germany); 5	Tacen (Slovenia); 30	La Seu (Spain); 39	128	20th
2019	Lee Valley (United Kingdom)	Bratislava (Slovakia)	Tacen (Slovenia); 38	Markkleeberg (Germany); 29	Prague (Czech Republic); 16	81	31st
2021	Prague (Czech Republic); 24	Markkleeberg (Germany); 2	La Seu (Spain); 2	Pau (France); 10		207	4th

=== Complete Championship Results ===
Year	Level	Venue	Event	Result
2014	Junior European	(North Macedonia) Skopje	K1 team	8th
2014	Junior European	(North Macedonia) Skopje	K1	21st
2015	U23 World	(Brazil) Foz do Iguaçu	K1 team	9th
2015	Junior World	(Brazil) Foz do Iguaçu	K1	17th
2015	World	(United Kingdom) Lee Valley	K1 team	10th
2015	World	(United Kingdom) Lee Valley	K1	56th
2016	Junior European	(Slovenia) Solkan	K1	2nd
2016	Junior World	(Poland) Kraków	K1	2nd
2016	European	(Slovakia) Liptovský Mikuláš	K1 team	7th
2016	European	(Slovakia) Liptovský Mikuláš	K1	9th
2017	U23 European	(Germany) Hohenlimburg	K1 team	3rd
2017	Junior European	(Germany) Hohenlimburg	K1	7th
2017	U23 World	(Slovakia) Bratislava	K1 team	18th
2017	Junior World	(Slovakia) Bratislava	K1	1st
2017	European	(Slovenia) Tacen	K1 team	9th
2017	European	(Slovenia) Tacen	K1	15th
2017	World	(France) Pau	K1 team	16th
2017	World	(France) Pau	K1	33rd
2018	U23 European	(Slovakia) Bratislava	K1 team	15th
2018	U23 European	(Slovakia) Bratislava	K1	32nd
2018	U23 World	(Italy) Ivrea	K1 team	3rd
2018	U23 World	(Italy) Ivrea	K1	18th
2018	European	(Czech Republic) Prague	K1 team	5th
2018	European	(Czech Republic) Prague	K1	13th
2018	World	(Brazil) Rio de Janeiro	K1 team	6th
2018	World	(Brazil) Rio de Janeiro	K1	14th

Year	Level	Venue	Event	Result
2019	U23 European	(Slovakia) Liptovský Mikuláš	K1 team	2nd
2019	U23 European	(Slovakia) Liptovský Mikuláš	K1	14th
2019	U23 World	(Poland) Kraków	K1 team	5th
2019	U23 World	(Poland) Kraków	K1	4th
2019	European	(France) Pau	K1 team	13th
2019	European	(France) Pau	K1	15th
2019	World	(Spain) La Seu d'Urgell	K1 team	13th
2019	World	(Spain) La Seu d'Urgell	K1	16th
2020	U23 European	(Poland) Kraków	K1	17th
2020	European	(Czech Republic) Prague	K1 team	6th
2020	European	(Czech Republic) Prague	K1	14th
2021	European	(Italy) Ivrea	K1 team	7th
2021	European	(Italy) Ivrea	K1	6th
2021	Olympics	(Japan) Tokyo	K1	4th
2021	World	(Slovakia) Bratislava	K1 team	9th
2021	World	(Slovakia) Bratislava	K1	27th
2021	World	(Slovakia) Bratislava	Kayak cross	45th
