= Mario Leitner =

Austrian slalom canoeist (born 1997)

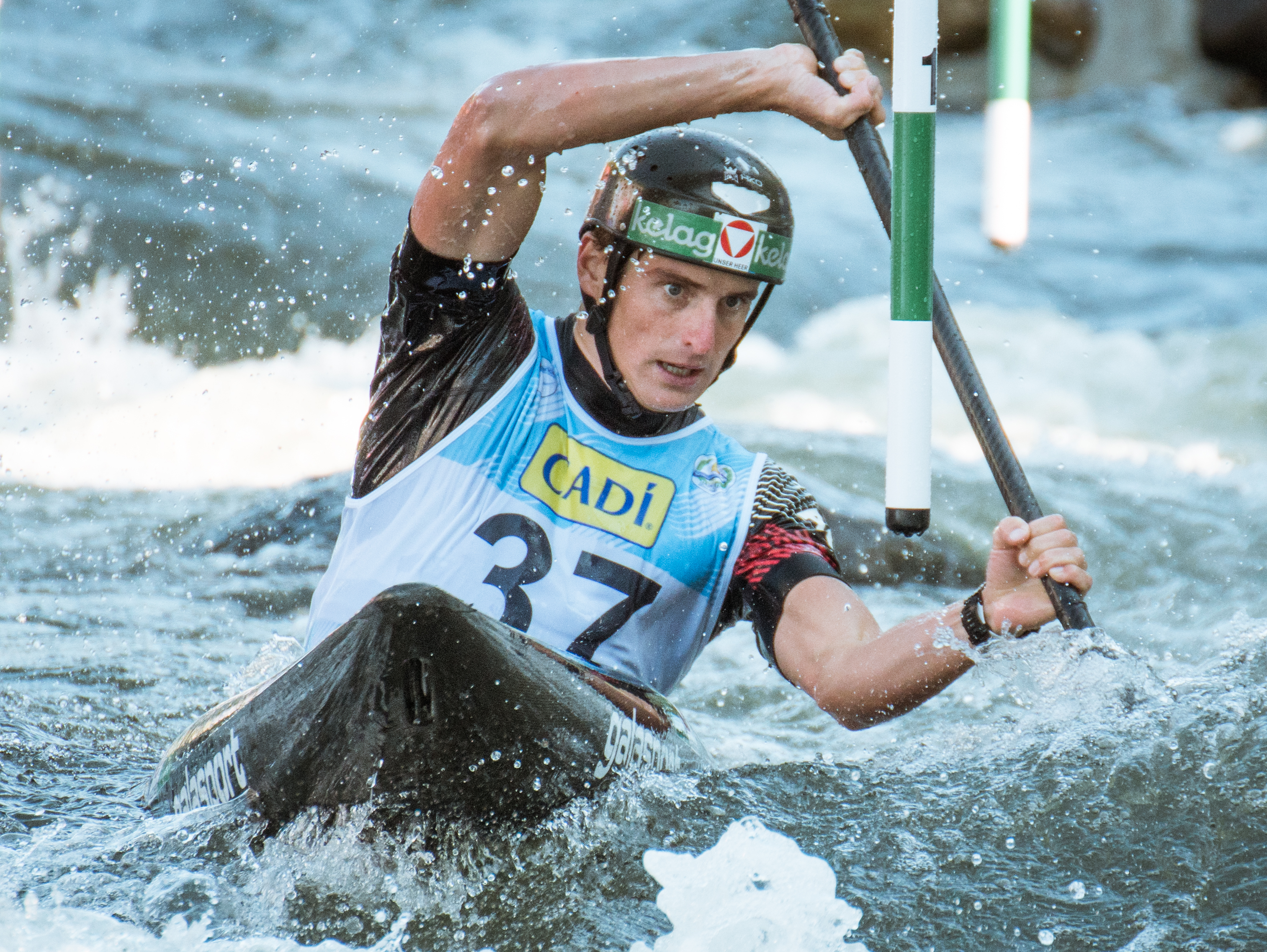
- Leitner at the 2019 Canoe Slalom World Championships.

Personal information
- Born: 2 February 1997 (age 29) St. Veit an der Glan, Austria
- Height: 177 cm (5 ft 10 in)
- Weight: 75 kg (165 lb)

Sport
- Sport: Canoe slalom
- Event: K1, Kayak cross
- Club: KC Glanegg
- Coached by: Jernej Abramič
Medal record
Men's canoe slalom
Representing Austria
World Championships
Bronze medal – third place	2021 Bratislava	Kayak cross
Bronze medal – third place	2026 Oklahoma City	K1 team
European Championships
Silver medal – second place	2022 Liptovský Mikuláš	Kayak cross
Silver medal – second place	2024 Tacen	K1
Silver medal – second place	2024 Tacen	K1 team
U23 World Championships
Silver medal – second place	2017 Bratislava	K1
Bronze medal – third place	2018 Ivrea	K1 team
Bronze medal – third place	2019 Kraków	K1
U23 European Championships
Gold medal – first place	2017 Hohenlimburg	K1
Gold medal – first place	2020 Kraków	K1
Silver medal – second place	2019 Liptovský Mikuláš	K1 team
Bronze medal – third place	2017 Hohenlimburg	K1 team
Junior World Championships
Gold medal – first place	2014 Penrith	K1

Mario Leitner (born 2 February 1997) is an Austrian slalom canoeist who has competed at the international level since 2012.

He won two bronze medals at the ICF Canoe Slalom World Championships (Kayak cross: 2021, K1 team: 2026). He also won three silver medals at the European Championships.

Leitner finished 13th in the K1 event at the 2016 Summer Olympics in Rio de Janeiro.

Leitner was introduced to canoeing by his father at age three, and joined a club aged five. In 2014 he won the Austrian Youth Sports Award after winning a gold medal at the junior world championships. He was the first male Austrian canoeist to win that title. His older sister Lisa also competes in canoe slalom.

== World Cup individual podiums ==
Season	Date	Venue	Position	Event
2021	5 September 2021	La Seu d'Urgell	2nd	Kayak cross
