= 2022 ICF Canoe Slalom World Championships – Men's C1 =

Men's canoe at the 2022 ICF Canoe Slalom World Championships
- Venue: Augsburg Eiskanal
- Location: Augsburg, Germany
- Dates: 29-31 July 2022
- Competitors: 64 from 31 nations

Medalists
gold medal	Sideris Tasiadis	Germany
silver medal	Alexander Slafkovský	Slovakia
bronze medal	Franz Anton	Germany

The men's canoe event at the 2022 ICF Canoe Slalom World Championships took place on 31 July 2022 at the Augsburg Eiskanal in Augsburg, with the qualification heats on 29 July 2022.

== Competition format ==
The event uses a three-round format with qualification heats, semifinal and final. Paddlers complete up to two runs in the heats, with the top ranked athletes starting last. In the first heat, the 20 fastest paddlers qualify automatically for the semifinal, whilst the rest compete in the second heat for additional 10 qualification spots. The final rank of non-qualifying athletes is determined by their second run score. Paddlers start in the reverse order of their heats position in the semifinal and complete a single run, with the top 10 advancing to the final. The start list for the final is once again in reverse order of the semifinal results. The athlete with the best time in the single-run final is awarded gold.

A penalty of 2 seconds is awarded for touching a gate and a 50-second penalty is awarded for missing a gate or negotiating it in the opposite direction.

An easier gate setup is generally used for the heats and then a more difficult one for semifinal and final.

== Schedule ==
All times are Central European Summer Time (UTC+2)

Date	Time	Round
29 July 2022
29 July 2022	10:13	Heats Run 1
29 July 2022	14:38	Heats Run 2
31 July 2022
31 July 2022	10:08	Semifinal
31 July 2022	12:12	Final

== Results ==
Penalties are included in the time shown. The fastest time in each round is shown in bold.

Rank	Bib	Athlete	Country	Heats						Semifinal			Final		
Rank	Bib	Athlete	Country	Run 1			Run 2			Semifinal			Final		
Rank	Bib	Athlete	Country	Time	Pen	Rank	Time	Pen	Rank	Time	Pen	Rank	Time	Pen	Rank
1st place, gold medalist(s)	5	Sideris Tasiadis	Germany	93.55	0	3	-			102.65	0	3	**101.05**	0	1
2nd place, silver medalist(s)	3	Alexander Slafkovský	Slovakia	95.19	0	7	-			103.49	0	5	102.23	4	2
3rd place, bronze medalist(s)	4	Franz Anton	Germany	99.23	2	22	**94.90**	0	1	**100.52**	0	1	102.66	0	3
4	1	Benjamin Savšek	Slovenia	93.34	0	2	-			103.37	0	4	103.06	2	4
5	6	Matej Beňuš	Slovakia	93.83	0	4	-			105.80	4	9	103.30	0	5
6	36	Mewen Debliquy	France	97.01	0	11	-			106.04	2	10	104.61	0	6
7	22	Vojtěch Heger	Czech Republic	102.04	2	34	97.54	0	6	102.60	0	2	105.19	2	7
8	10	Adam Burgess	Great Britain	95.59	0	8	-			103.63	0	6	106.84	2	8
9	9	Václav Chaloupka	Czech Republic	104.31	2	38	96.60	0	4	103.79	2	8	107.07	2	9
10	20	Kacper Sztuba	Poland	98.08	0	17	-			103.71	0	7	150.28	50	10
11	8	Nicolas Gestin	France	94.63	0	6	-			107.05	2	11	did not advance		
12	12	Miquel Travé	Spain	98.80	2	20	-			107.25	4	12	did not advance		
13	7	Denis Gargaud Chanut	France	**91.93**	0	1	-			107.29	6	13	did not advance		
14	2	Luka Božič	Slovenia	99.85	4	27	98.95	2	8	107.48	2	14	did not advance		
15	11	Ryan Westley	Great Britain	100.07	2	28	96.34	0	3	107.60	2	15	did not advance		
16	21	Thomas Koechlin	Switzerland	156.58	50	54	96.73	0	5	107.78	2	16	did not advance		
17	15	Raffaello Ivaldi	Italy	98.19	2	18	-			107.96	0	17	did not advance		
18	27	Luis Fernández	Spain	97.90	2	15	-			109.11	0	18	did not advance		
19	16	Lukáš Rohan	Czech Republic	97.75	2	14	-			109.14	6	19	did not advance		
20	23	Paolo Ceccon	Italy	96.33	0	9	-			110.06	2	20	did not advance		
21	17	Roberto Colazingari	Italy	96.53	0	10	-			110.23	4	21	did not advance		
22	26	Casey Eichfeld	United States	97.97	2	16	-			110.79	2	22	did not advance		
23	18	Anže Berčič	Slovenia	99.60	2	24	100.15	2	10	111.21	2	23	did not advance		
24	30	Jake Cochrane	Ireland	152.11	54	52	95.82	0	2	111.41	4	24	did not advance		
25	24	Matija Marinić	Croatia	97.70	2	13	-			111.44	4	25	did not advance		
26	31	Timo Trummer	Germany	93.87	0	5	-			113.66	8	26	did not advance		
27	33	Robert Hendrick	Ireland	97.59	0	12	-			114.36	4	27	did not advance		
28	13	Ander Elosegi	Spain	98.67	0	19	-			114.38	2	28	did not advance		
29	28	Takuya Haneda	Japan	109.01	4	46	98.41	0	7	116.28	2	29	did not advance		
30	55	Alibek Temirgaliev	Uzbekistan	107.10	4	43	100.07	2	9	182.53	60	30	did not advance		
31	39	Alexandr Kulikov	Kazakhstan	107.63	4	44	100.57	0	11	did not advance					
32	45	Alex Baldoni	Canada	152.74	52	53	100.64	0	12	did not advance					
33	32	Jean Pierre Bourhis	Senegal	99.31	0	23	101.47	0	13	did not advance					
34	37	Yves Bourhis	Senegal	101.67	0	33	102.27	2	14	did not advance					
35	19	Grzegorz Hedwig	Poland	100.39	4	30	102.52	6	15	did not advance					
36	44	Michał Wiercioch	Poland	105.21	4	40	102.77	0	16	did not advance					
37	47	Christos Tsakmakis	Greece	105.51	0	41	103.60	2	17	did not advance					
38	38	Peter Linksted	Great Britain	99.73	0	26	104.13	0	18	did not advance					
39	40	Kaylen Bassett	Australia	108.43	2	45	105.05	4	19	did not advance					
40	57	Zhang Zhicheng	China	159.25	60	55	107.43	4	20	did not advance					
41	48	Nathaniel Francis	United States	103.54	0	37	108.25	4	21	did not advance					
42	56	Abubakir Bukanov	Uzbekistan	115.58	4	49	109.20	2	22	did not advance					
43	50	Shota Saito	Japan	119.19	2	50	109.45	2	23	did not advance					
44	52	Daniel Parry	Canada	166.69	54	58	111.44	4	24	did not advance					
45	54	Roko Bengeri	Croatia	159.73	56	56	117.21	8	25	did not advance					
46	41	José Carvalho	Portugal	257.28	156	61	118.49	4	26	did not advance					
47	42	Joris Otten	Netherlands	115.34	2	47	122.00	2	27	did not advance					
48	51	Oliver Puchner	New Zealand	105.96	2	42	122.36	12	28	did not advance					
49	59	Matteo-Alexander Olar	Romania	141.87	10	51	138.47	14	29	did not advance					
50	61	Emīls Varslavāns	Latvia	170.47	10	59	138.87	6	30	did not advance					
51	25	Liam Jegou	Ireland	98.96	0	21	150.11	50	31	did not advance					
52	49	Kauã da Silva	Brazil	100.31	2	29	150.79	52	32	did not advance					
53	14	Marko Mirgorodský	Slovakia	102.21	4	35	151.66	54	33	did not advance					
54	34	Tristan Carter	Australia	105.16	6	39	152.65	50	34	did not advance					
55	29	Zachary Lokken	United States	99.60	0	24	152.73	54	35	did not advance					
56	43	Shota Sasaki	Japan	103.01	0	36	153.20	52	36	did not advance					
57	35	Brodie Crawford	Australia	101.19	2	32	154.94	52	37	did not advance					
58	53	Xie Yuancong	China	101.16	0	31	156.84	54	38	did not advance					
59	60	Muhammet Usta	Turkey	115.40	8	48	158.43	52	39	did not advance					
60	46	Terence Saramandif	Mauritius	214.85	104	60	159.80	52	40	did not advance					
61	58	Vishvjeet Kushwaha	India	162.13	16	57	186.13	58	41	did not advance					
62	63	Lucky Verma	India	258.07	74	62	240.37	70	42	did not advance					
63	64	Jhon Hunter Rodriguez Canela	Peru	346.39	206	63	242.26	72	43	did not advance					
64	62	Vishal Kewat	India	422.84	256	64	262.92	16	44	did not advance					
