= 2022 Oceania Canoe Slalom Championships =

- Venue: Penrith Whitewater Stadium
- Location: Penrith, Australia
- Dates: 28–30 January 2022

The 2022 Oceania Canoe Slalom Championships took place in Penrith, Australia from 28 to 30 January 2021 under the auspices of International Canoe Federation (ICF).

== Competition format ==
At the 2022 Oceania Championships was contested Open, U23 and Junior (U18) in the Men K1, Women K1, Men C1 and Women C1. All competitors had one heats qualification run and was ranked. Based on the ranking of the first qualification run, the following boats progressed directly to the semi-final: 30 K1M, 20 K1W, C1M, C1W. The remaining competitors in each event had a second heats qualification run and the following boats progressed to the semi-final: 10 K1M, K1W, C1M, C1W. Following the semi-final, the top 10 boats from each event progressed to the finals. All events was awarded in the Junior, U23 and Senior age categories.

== Schedule ==
Date	Event
28 January	Heats: Session 1 WK1 MK1, WC1, MC1
29 January	Semi-finals / Finals: WK1, MK1
30 January	Semi-finals / Finals: WC1, MC1

== Medal summary ==
Event	Gold		Silver		Bronze	
Men's C1	Tristan Carter; Australia	106.15	Kaylen Bassett; Australia	107.67	Lachlan Bassett; Australia	107.87
Men's K1	Lucien Delfour; Australia	95.42	Mathieu Biazizzo; France	97.23	Timothy Anderson; Australia	100.66
Women's C1	Jessica Fox; Australia	106.38	Noemie Fox; Australia	118.29	Kate Eckhardt; Australia	122.26
Women's K1	Jessica Fox; Australia	105.09	Noemie Fox; Australia	110.95	Kate Eckhardt; Australia	116.05
