= Noel Hendrick =

Irish canoeist (born 1997)

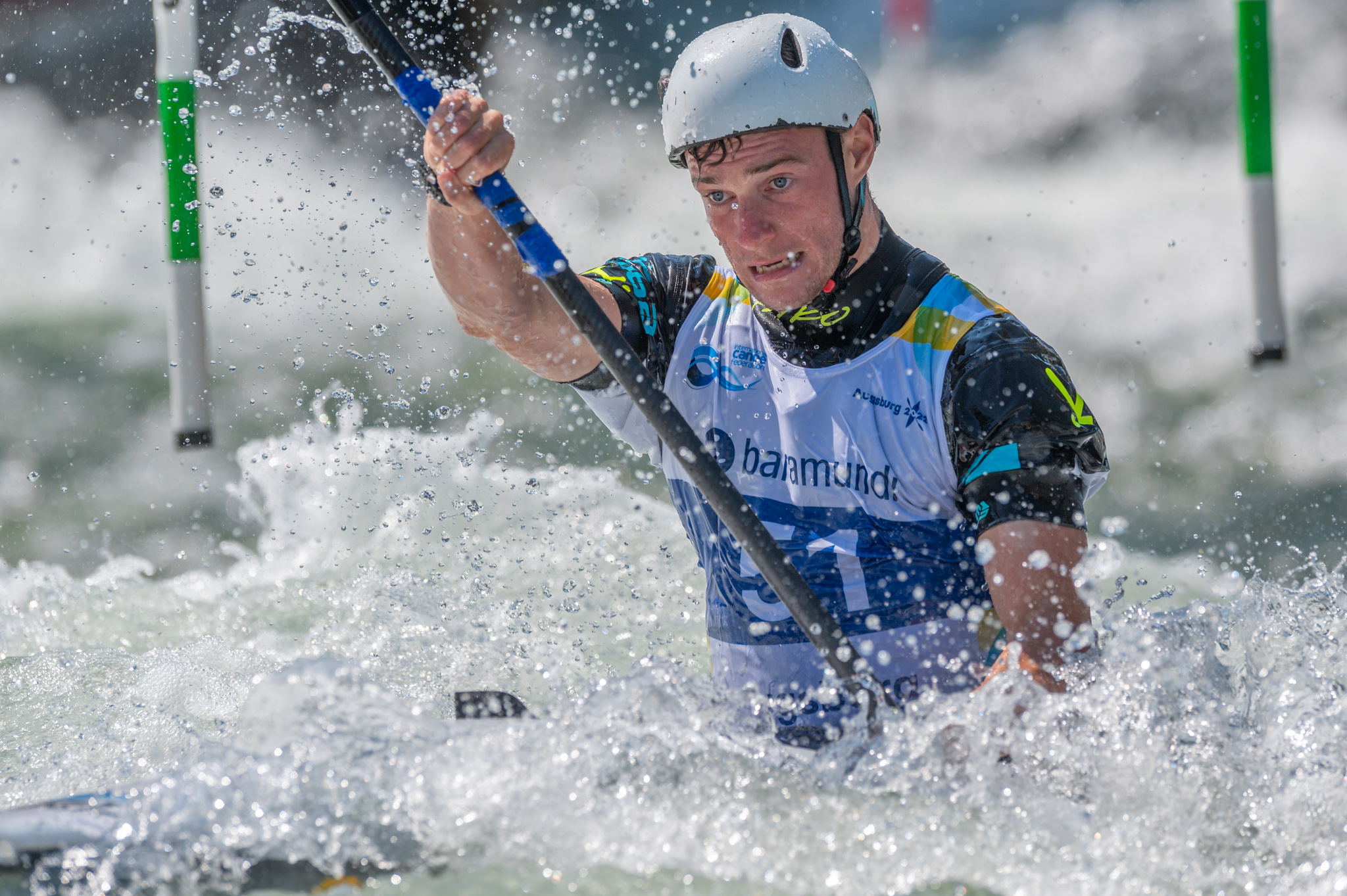
- Hendrick at the 2022 World Championships

Personal information
- Born: 24 December 1997 (age 28) Dublin, Ireland
- Home town: Donadea, County Kildare, Ireland

Sport
- Country: Ireland
- Sport: Canoe slalom
- Event: K1, Kayak cross

Noel Hendrick (born 24 December 1997) is an Irish slalom canoeist, who has competed at the international level since 2013. He competed at the 2024 Paris Olympics.

== Career ==
Hendrick is coached by Eoin Rheinisch, a canoeist that Hendrick went to watch compete at the 2012 Olympic Games.

Hendrick was fourth in the C2 event at the 2015 World Junior Championships, competing with his brother Robert.

He competed for Ireland at the 2022 ICF Canoe Slalom World Championships in Augsburg, Germany. He represented Ireland at the 2023 European Games in Kraków In June 2023.

He qualified an Irish boat in the K1 for the Olympic Games with his performance at the Canoe Slalom World Championships in September 2023. He was subsequently selected for the 2024 Paris Olympics, where he finished 15th in the K1 event and 21st in kayak cross.

== Personal life ==
From Donadea, County Kildare, his twin brother Robert is also a canoeist. He has a degree in software engineering from Maynooth University and a master's degree in artificial intelligence from Dublin City University.
