= Matija Marinić =

Croatian canoeist (born 1990)

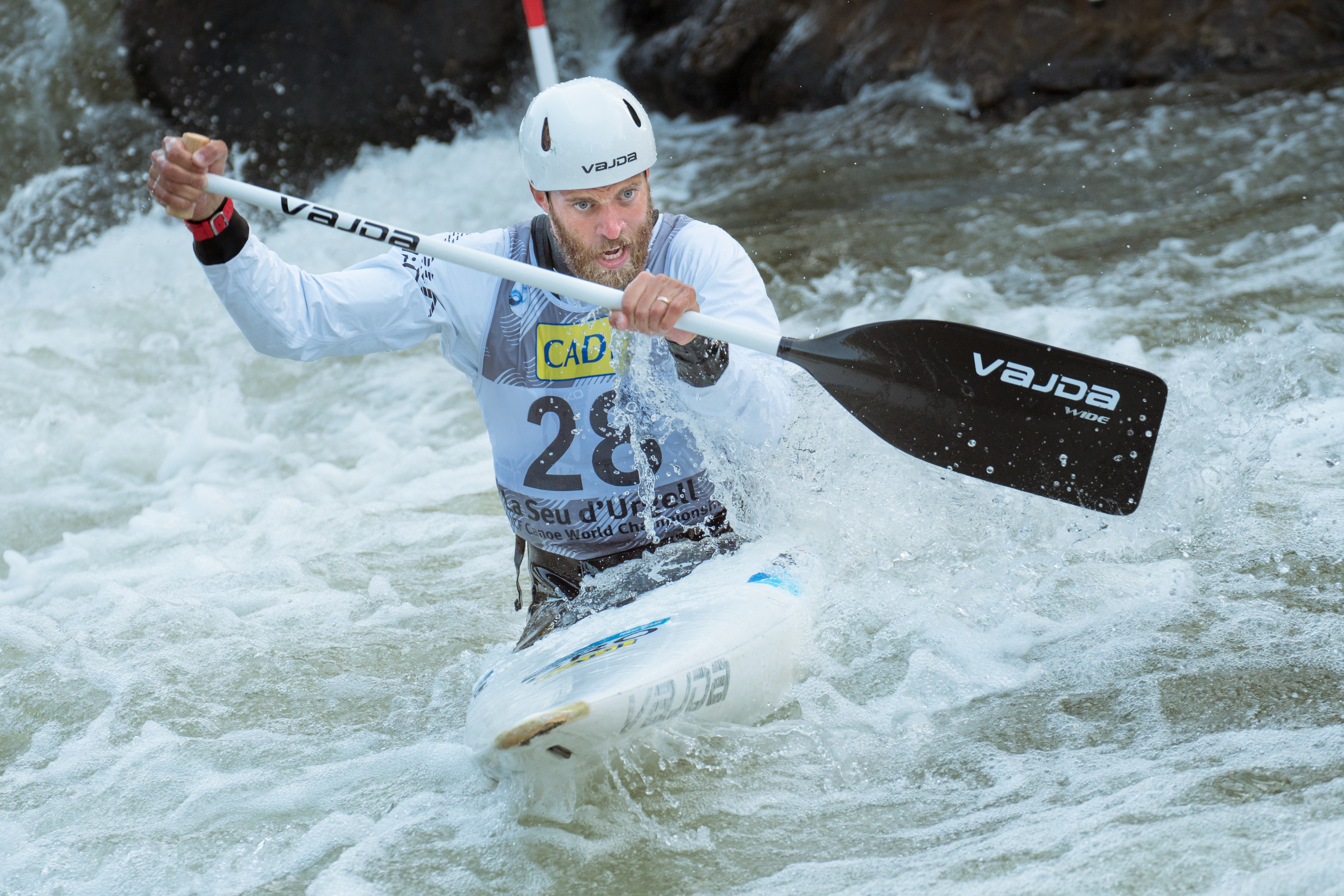
- Marinić at the 2019 ICF Canoe Slalom World Championships

Personal information
- Nationality: Croatian
- Born: 24 December 1990 (age 35) Rijeka
- Home town: Zagreb

Sport
- Country: Croatia
- Sport: Canoe slalom
- Rank: No. 34
- Event: C1
- Club: Kajak Kanu Klub Zagreb
- Coached by: Stjepan Perestegi
Medal record
Men's canoe slalom
Representing Croatia
U23 European Championships
| Gold medal – first place | 2013 Bourg-Saint-Maurice | C1 |
| Silver medal – second place | 2011 Banja Luka | C1 |

Matija Marinić (born 24 December 1990) is a Croatian slalom canoeist who has competed at the international level since 2006. Marinić competed at the 2020 Summer Olympics in Tokyo finishing in 11th in the C1 event. He also competed at the 2024 Summer Olympics in Paris, finishing 8th in the C1 event and 32nd in kayak cross. He is from Zagreb and is coached by 1992 Olympian Stjepan Perestegi.

== Personal life ==
Matija married Tea Budimir, a physiotherapist, in 2016 and has a child named Marko. He is from Rijeka on the Kvarner Gulf and currently lives in Croatia's capital city, Zagreb. He completes most of his training on the Sava River in his home town but spends a significant proportion of his time at the Tacen Whitewater Course in nearby Ljubljana, making it somewhat of a home course for him and other Croatian slalom canoeists.

== Career ==
=== Junior ===
Matija began paddling in 1997 with Kajak Kanu Klub Zagreb after transitioning from water polo. He made his international debut in 2006 aged 15, competing at the Junior European Championships and Junior World Championships in Nottingham and Solkan, respectively. He finished 27th at both events.

In 2008 Matija made the finals at both junior international events, finishing 10th at the Europeans (after incurring a 50-second penalty) and 6th at the Worlds. During this time he also competed at the U23 level, finishing 8th in C1 team at the Europeans in 2007 and 2008. Matija competed in several World Cups as a Junior and achieved a 15th place at the 2008 event on his "home" course in Tacen.

=== U23 ===
Marinić began competing at the U23 level in 2010, finishing 9th at the U23 European Championships in Markkleeberg. In the same year he competed at the senior World Championships in Tacen and finished in 13th place, aged 19. He competed in the inaugural edition of the ICF World U23 Canoe Slalom Championships in 2012 in Wausau, Wisconsin and finished in 29th place. He competed in the same event again in 2013 in Liptovský Mikuláš, improving to 18th place.

In 2011 Matija won a silver medal in C1 at the U23 European Championships in neighbouring Bosnia and Herzegovina and bettered this achievement two years later by becoming the 2013 U23 European Champion in Bourg-Saint-Maurice. Matija also won a bronze medal at the 2013 Canoe Slalom World Cup in Tacen.

=== Senior ===
Marinić finished in 42nd place at the 2015 World Championships in Lee Valley which doubled as a qualification event for the 2016 Summer Olympics, missing out on automatic qualification. His only other chance to qualify was at the 2016 European Championships in Liptovský Mikuláš. Matija finished in 11th place at this event, just short of the top ten and the opportunity to race Ander Elosegi for the European quota.

At the 2019 World Championships in La Seu d'Urgell, Matija finished in 12th place, automatically qualifying for the 2020 Summer Olympics in Tokyo as the 10th ranked NOC. Due to the COVID-19 pandemic, the only two major competitions Matija competed in between the 2019 Worlds and the Olympic Games were the 2020 and 2021 European Championships, where he finished in 16th and 14th place, respectively.

Matija has dealt with knee issues since he was 18, due to the awkward sitting position required for C1. Following the announcement of the postponement of the 2020 Games, he underwent knee surgery so as to not be held back by his injury and to be "faster and better" at the delayed 2021 Games. Marinić spent the winter leading into the Olympics training at Wadi Adventure in the United Arab Emirates with fellow Croatian Ren Korpes. In the lead-up to the postponed Games he won an ICF World Ranking race in April in Tacen, and made the final of the 2021 Canoe Slalom World Cup in Prague, where he finished in third place but was disqualified for a delayed start.

On 13 July 2021, 8 days after arriving in Tokyo to prepare for the 2020 Summer Olympics, Matija and coach Stjepan were sent into self-isolation by the Olympic organisers due to there being an infected passenger on their flight. They were initially required to self-isolate for a week but were allowed to return to training on the 15 July, two days later, following an appeal by the president of the Croatian Olympic Committee Zlatko Mateša. Mateša publicly criticized the handling of the issue, calling it a "glaring example of the inability of the organizers to deal with the problems associated with the pandemic".

Matija finished in 11th place in the C1 event at the 2020 Games, after being eliminated in the semi-final.

== Results ==
=== World Cup individual podiums ===
| Season | Date | Venue | Position | Event |
|---|---|---|---|---|
| 2013 | 17 August 2013 | Tacen | 3rd | C1 |

=== Complete World Cup results ===
| Year | WC1 | WC2 | WC3 | WC4 | WC5 | Points | Position |
|---|---|---|---|---|---|---|---|
| 2008 | Prague (Czech Republic) | Tacen (Slovenia); 30 | Augsburg (Germany); 32 | Continent | | 24 | 46th |
| 2008 | Continent | Prague (Czech Republic); 27 | Tacen (Slovenia); 15 | Augsburg (Germany) | | 44 | 39th |
| 2009 | Continent | Pau (France); 32 | Bratislava (Slovakia) | Augsburg (Germany) | | 2 | 65th |
| 2010 | Continent (Australia); 17 | Prague (Czech Republic); 20 | La Seu (Spain) | Augsburg (Germany); 27 | | 60 | 26th |
| 2011 | Tacen (Slovenia); 7 | L'Argentière (France) | Markkleeberg (Germany) | Prague (Czech Republic); 34 | | 42 | 35th |
| 2012 | Cardiff (United Kingdom) | Pau (France) | La Seu (Spain) | Prague (Czech Republic); 32 | Bratislava (Slovakia) | 2 | 69th |
| 2013 | Cardiff (United Kingdom) | Augsburg (Germany); 13 | La Seu (Spain) | Tacen (Slovenia); 3 | Bratislava (Slovakia) | 80 | 22nd |
| 2014 | Lee Valley (United Kingdom); 24 | Tacen (Slovenia); 11 | Prague (Czech Republic); 20 | La Seu (Spain); 25 | Augsburg (Germany); 34 | 91 | 24th |
| 2015 | Prague (Czech Republic); 33 | Kraków (Poland); 14 | Liptovský Mikuláš (Slovakia); 24 | La Seu (Spain); 15 | Pau (France); 31 | 78 | 27th |
| 2016 | Ivrea (Italy); 25 | La Seu (Spain); 22 | Pau (France); 25 | Prague (Czech Republic) | Tacen (Slovenia); 16 | 105 | 21st |
| 2017 | Prague (Czech Republic); 23 | Augsburg (Germany); 34 | Markkleeberg (Germany) | Ivrea (Italy) | La Seu (Spain); 32 | 23 | 44th |
| 2018 | Liptovský Mikuláš (Slovakia); 15 | Kraków (Poland); 26 | Augsburg (Germany); 27 | Tacen (Slovenia); 16 | La Seu (Spain); 26 | 105 | 22nd |
| 2019 | Lee Valley (United Kingdom); 51 | Bratislava (Slovakia) | Tacen (Slovenia); 7 | Markkleeberg (Germany) | Prague (Czech Republic); 23 | 80 | 28th |
| 2020 | Tacen (Slovenia); 4 | Pau (France); 13 | | | | N/A^{[a]} | |
| 2021 | Prague (Czech Republic); 10^{[b]} | Markkleeberg (Germany); 14 | La Seu (Spain) | Pau (France); 13 | | 123 | 14th |

Notes
^{a} No overall rankings were determined by the ICF, with only two races possible due to the COVID-19 pandemic.
^{b} Marinić finished 3rd but was disqualified from the final, being classified 10th.

=== Complete Championship Results ===
| Year | Level | Venue | Event | Result |
|---|---|---|---|---|
| 2006 | Junior World | (Slovenia) Solkan | C1 | 27th |
| 2006 | Junior European | (United Kingdom) Nottingham | C1 | 27th |
| 2007 | U23 European | (Poland) Kraków | C1 team | 8th |
| 2007 | Junior European | (Poland) Kraków | C1 | 18th |
| 2008 | European | (Poland) Kraków | C1 team | 8th |
| 2008 | European | (Poland) Kraków | C1 | 25th |
| 2008 | U23 European | (Slovenia) Solkan | C1 team | 8th |
| 2008 | Junior European | (Slovenia) Solkan | C1 | 10th |
| 2008 | Junior World | (Czech Republic) Roudnice | C1 | 6th |
| 2010 | U23 European | (Germany) Markkleeberg | C1 | 9th |
| 2010 | European | (Slovakia) Bratislava | C1 | 27th |
| 2010 | World | (Slovenia) Tacen | C1 | 13th |
| 2011 | European | (Spain) La Seu d'Urgell | C1 | 20th |
| 2011 | U23 European | (Bosnia and Herzegovina) Banja Luka | C1 team | 9th |
| 2011 | U23 European | (Bosnia and Herzegovina) Banja Luka | C1 | 2nd |
| 2011 | World | (Slovakia) Bratislava | C1 | 29th |
| 2012 | European | (Germany) Augsburg | C1 | 31st |
| 2012 | U23 World | (United States) Wausau | C1 | 29th |
| 2012 | U23 European | (Slovenia) Solkan | C1 | 22nd |
| 2013 | European | (Poland) Kraków | C1 | 15th |
| 2013 | U23 World | (Slovakia) Liptovský Mikuláš | C1 | 18th |
| 2013 | U23 European | (France) Bourg-Saint-Maurice | C1 | 1st |
| 2013 | World | (Czech Republic) Prague | C1 | 22nd |
| 2014 | European | (Austria) Vienna | C1 | 17th |
| 2014 | World | (United States) Deep Creek | C1 | 27th |

| Year | Level | Venue | Event | Result |
|---|---|---|---|---|
| 2015 | European | (Germany) Markkleeberg | C1 | 19th |
| 2015 | World | Lee Valley | C1 | 42nd |
| 2016 | European | (Slovakia) Liptovský Mikuláš | C1 | 11th |
| 2017 | European | (Slovenia) Tacen | C1 | 30th |
| 2017 | World | (France) Pau | C1 | 42nd |
| 2018 | European | (Czech Republic) Prague | C1 | 30th |
| 2018 | World | (Brazil) Rio de Janeiro | C1 | 15th |
| 2019 | European | (France) Pau | C1 | 29th |
| 2019 | World | (Spain) La Seu d'Urgell | C1 | 11th |
| 2020 | European | (Czech Republic) Prague | C1 | 16th |
| 2021 | European | (Italy) Ivrea | C1 | 14th |
| 2021 | Olympic | (Japan) Tokyo | C1 | 11th |
| 2021 | World | (Slovakia) Bratislava | C1 | 17th |
