= Yves Bourhis =

Senegalese canoeist

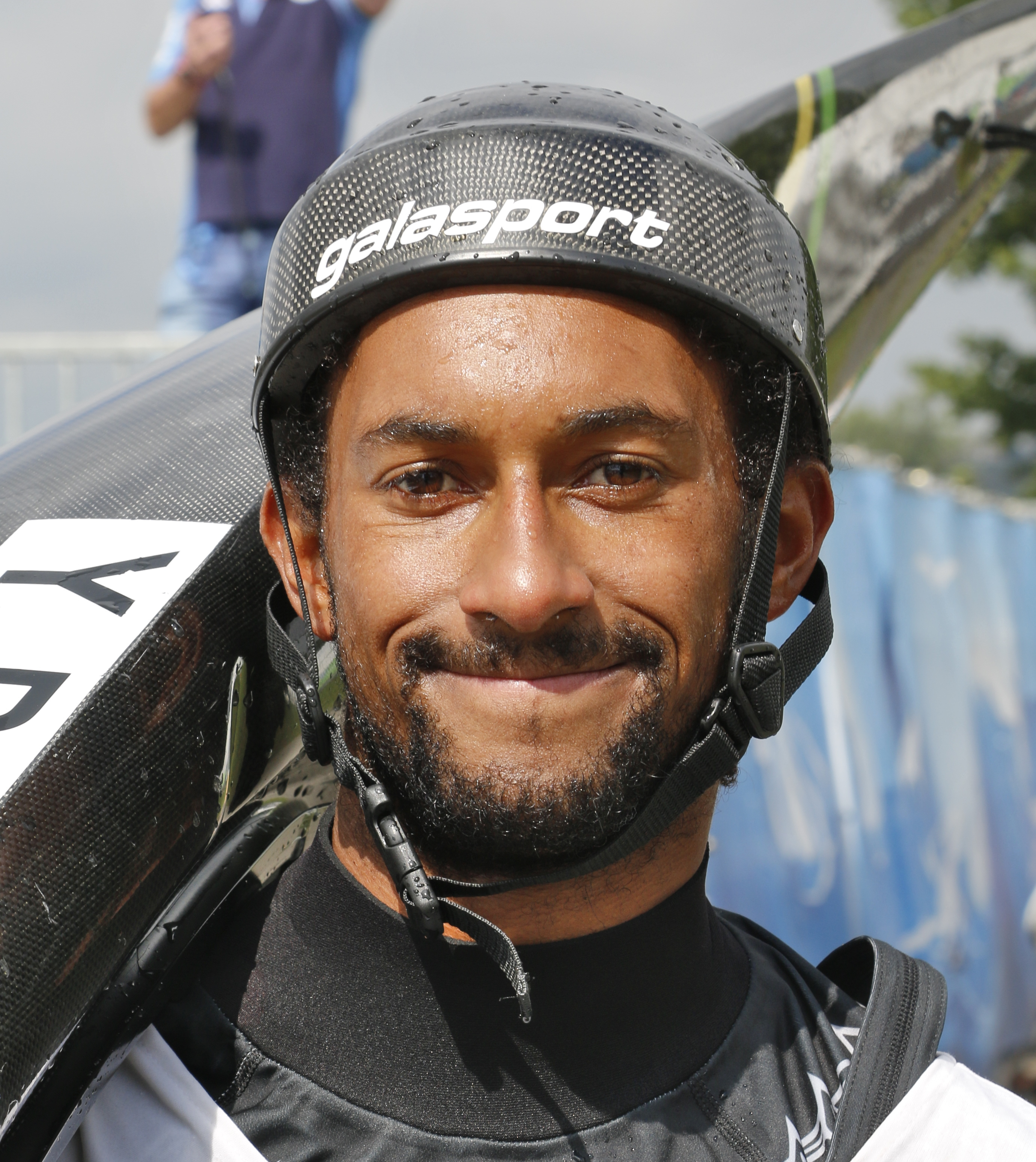
- Bourhis in 2024

Personal information
- Born: 16 March 1998 (age 27) Gouesnac'h, France

Sport
- Sport: Canoe slalom
- Event: C1, K1, Kayak cross
- Club: Club Canoe Kayak Quimper Cornouaille

Yves Marcel Victor Bourhis (born 16 March 1998) is a French-Senegalese canoeist, who has competed at the international level since 2015, representing Senegal.

He competed at the 2024 Summer Olympics in Paris finishing 12th in the C1 event, 22nd in the K1 event and 19th in kayak cross.

His brother is Jean-Pierre Bourhis, who also represented Senegal in canoe slalom at the Olympics.
