= Salim Jemai =

French-Tunisian canoeist (born 2005)

Personal information
- Born: 1 March 2005 (age 20) Strasbourg, France

Sport
- Sport: Canoe slalom
- Event(s): K1, Kayak cross, C1
- Club: ASCPA Strasbourg

Salim Ahmad Jemai (born 1 March 2005) is a French-Tunisian slalom canoeist, who has competed at the international level since 2023, representing Tunisia.

He competed at the 2024 Summer Olympics in Paris, finishing 20th in the C1 event, 17th in the K1 event and 18th in kayak cross. He was the first athlete to represent Tunisia in canoe slalom at the Olympic Games.
