= Andy Barat =

Comorian canoeist (born 1997)

Personal information
- Born: 29 November 1997 (age 28) Anjouan, Comoros

Sport
- Country: Comoros
- Sport: Canoe slalom
- Event: K1, Kayak cross

Andy Barat (born 29 November 1997) is a Comorian slalom canoeist who has competed at the international level since 2023, specializing in K1 and kayak cross. He represented Comoros at the 2024 Summer Olympics.

== Biography ==
Barat was born in 1997 and spent his early years in Mutsamudu, a city in the Comoros, before later moving to France. His father is from Anjouan while his mother is French. He played multiple sports growing up, including football, judo and BMX biking. When he was approximately 13, he was introduced to kayak slalom by his cousin, a member of the club CKClisson in Loire-Atlantique. In France, Barat attended the Raphaël-Elizé school in Sablé-sur-Sarthe. He competed at canoeing competitions in France and won the silver medal at the French Slalom Cup in 2022. He also served four years in the French Army, being a member of the 3rd Marine Infantry Regiment through 2023.

Having served for France, his mother's country, Barat decided that he wanted to represent his father's country and "make the Comorian colours shine." He began competing in international canoeing events under the Comorian flag in 2023. He participated at several events that year, including in Slovenia, Spain, France, Britain and Germany. Among the 2023 events he participated in were the Canoe Slalom World Cup and the World Championships. He competed at the World Cup again in 2024 and also won the silver medal at the 2024 African championships.

He qualified for the 2024 Summer Olympics and is the country's first-ever Olympic canoeist. He finished 24th in the K1 event and 38th in kayak cross.

Barat is regarded as the best canoeist for the Comoros, a sport that has been described as "new ... if not non-existent" in the country. He continues his training at the Clisson Canoe Kayak Club, where he is highly valued by the young members who support him daily and sometimes train alongside him.
