= Tristan Carter =

Australian canoeist (born 1998)

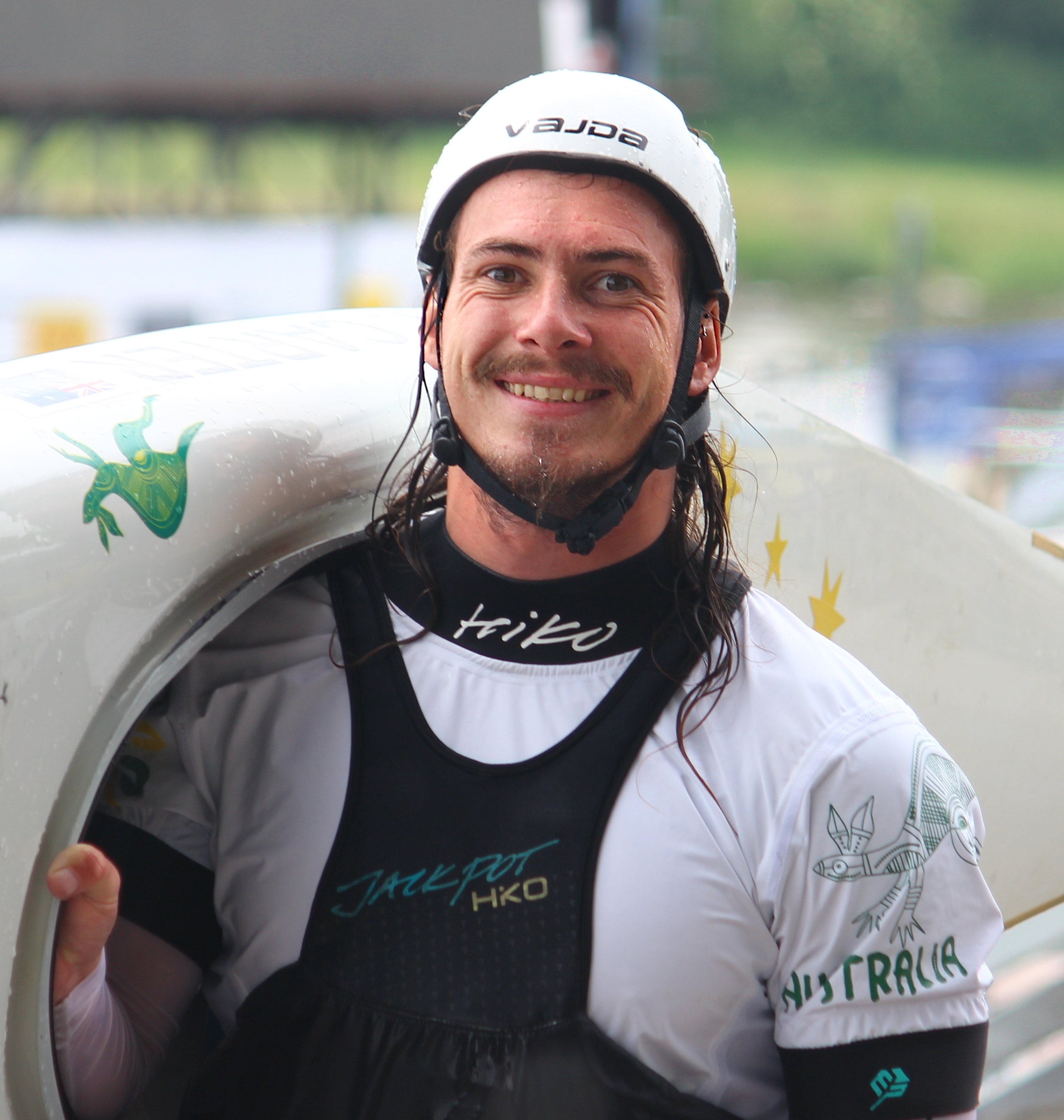
- Carter in 2023

Personal information
- Full name: Tristan James Carter
- Born: 17 February 1998 (age 28) Rosanna, Australia
- Education: Ivanhoe Grammar School
- Years active: 2014-present

Sport
- Sport: Canoe slalom
- Event: C1, K1, Kayak cross
- Club: Melbourne Canoe Club

Achievements and titles
- Olympic finals: 2024, Paris, France
Medal record
Men's canoe slalom
Representing Australia
Oceania Championships
Gold medal – first place	2022 Penrith	C1
Gold medal – first place	2025 Penrith	C1

Tristan Carter (born 17 February 1998) is an Australian canoeist who has competed at the international level since 2014.

He competed at the 2024 Summer Olympics, finishing 9th in the C1 event and 15th in kayak cross.

He is a two-time Oceania Champion in C1 and 2024 Australian Open winner in C1. He made his World Cup debut in 2015 in Liptovský Mikuláš. He first appeared at the ICF Canoe Slalom World Championships in 2017 in Pau.
