= Canoeing at the 2024 Summer Olympics – Men's slalom C-1 =

Men's slalom C-1 at the Games of the XXXIII Olympiad
- Venue: National Olympic Nautical Stadium of Île-de-France, Vaires-sur-Marne
- Dates: 27 July 2024 (heats); 29 July 2024 (semifinal & final)

Medalists
1st place, gold medalist(s)		Nicolas Gestin	France
2nd place, silver medalist(s)		Adam Burgess	Great Britain
3rd place, bronze medalist(s)		Matej Beňuš	Slovakia

The men's C-1 slalom canoeing event at the 2024 Summer Olympics took place on 27 and 29 July 2024 at the National Olympic Nautical Stadium of Île-de-France in Vaires-sur-Marne.

Benjamin Savšek was a 2020 Olympic champion, but he was placed eleventh.

== Background ==
This will the 10th appearance of the event, having previously appeared in every Summer Olympics with slalom canoeing: 1972 and 1992–2020.

== Competition format ==
Slalom canoeing uses a three-round format, with heats, semifinal, and final. In the heats, each canoeist has two runs at the course with the better time counting. The top 16 advance to the semifinal. In the semifinal, the canoeists get a single run; the top 12 advance to the final. The best time in the single-run final wins gold.

The canoe course is approximately 250 metres long, with up to 25 gates that the canoeist must pass in the correct direction. Penalty time is added for infractions such as passing on the wrong side or touching a gate. Runs typically last approximately 95 seconds.

== Schedule ==
All times are Central European Summer Time (UTC+2)

The men's slalom C-1 will take place over two days.

Date	Time	Round
27 July 2024	15:00	Heats
29 July 2024	15:30; 17:20	Semifinal; Final

== Results ==
Rank	Bib	Canoeist	Nation	Preliminary Heats						Semifinal			Final		
Rank	Bib	Canoeist	Nation	1st Ride	Pen.	2nd Ride	Pen.	Best	Order	Time	Pen.	Order	Time	Pen.	Order
1st place, gold medalist(s)	2	Nicolas Gestin	France	89.90	0	88.78	0	88.78	1	93.12	0	1	91.36	0	1
2nd place, silver medalist(s)	7	Adam Burgess	Great Britain	90.87	0	95.08	4	90.87	2	97.21	0	4	96.84	0	2
3rd place, bronze medalist(s)	4	Matej Beňuš	Slovakia	100.28	2	94.91	2	94.91	11	98.59	4	11	97.03	0	3
4	6	Sideris Tasiadis	Germany	92.44	0	92.43	0	92.43	7	96.74	0	3	97.27	0	4
5	3	Miquel Travé	Spain	92.19	2	143.45	56	92.19	6	96.69	0	2	97.92	2	5
6	8	Lukáš Rohan	Czech Republic	95.63	2	97.74	2	95.63	12	97.54	4	10	98.09	2	6
7	10	Liam Jegou	Ireland	102.67	0	99.93	6	99.93	16	96.52	2	6	98.52	2	7
8	11	Matija Marinić	Croatia	91.61	0	98.44	2	91.61	3	98.82	0	7	100.35	2	8
9	9	Tristan Carter	Australia	94.19	0	103.87	4	94.19	9	99.45	0	8	100.73	2	9
10	12	Grzegorz Hedwig	Poland	94.08	2	100.30	8	94.08	8	104.24	6	12	105.81	2	10
11	1	Benjamin Savšek	Slovenia	97.04	2	192.64	102	97.04	14	96.28	2	5	144.93	50	11
12	13	Yves Bourhis	Senegal	94.68	4	92.14	0	92.14	5	99.51	0	9	145.78	50	12
13	17	Takuya Haneda	Japan	96.82	0	99.59	0	96.82	13	103.11	4	13	did not advance		
14	5	Raffaello Ivaldi	Italy	91.90	0	94.96	4	91.90	4	108.20	0	14	did not advance		
15	15	Alex Baldoni	Canada	97.32	2	98.56	0	97.32	15	123.41	4	15	did not advance		
16	14	Casey Eichfeld	United States	99.84	6	94.69	2	94.69	10	104.23	58	16	did not advance		
17	16	Joris Otten	Netherlands	101.92	0	110.93	8	101.92	17	did not advance					
18	20	Pepe Gonçalves	Brazil	111.07	8	154.48	56	111.07	18	did not advance					
19	18	Amir Rezanejad	Refugee Olympic Team	116.16	6	119.48	6	116.16	19	did not advance					
20	19	Salim Jemai	Tunisia	128.42	4	130.02	6	128.42	20	did not advance					
