= Isak Öhrström =

Swedish slalom canoeist and an Olympian (born 1990)

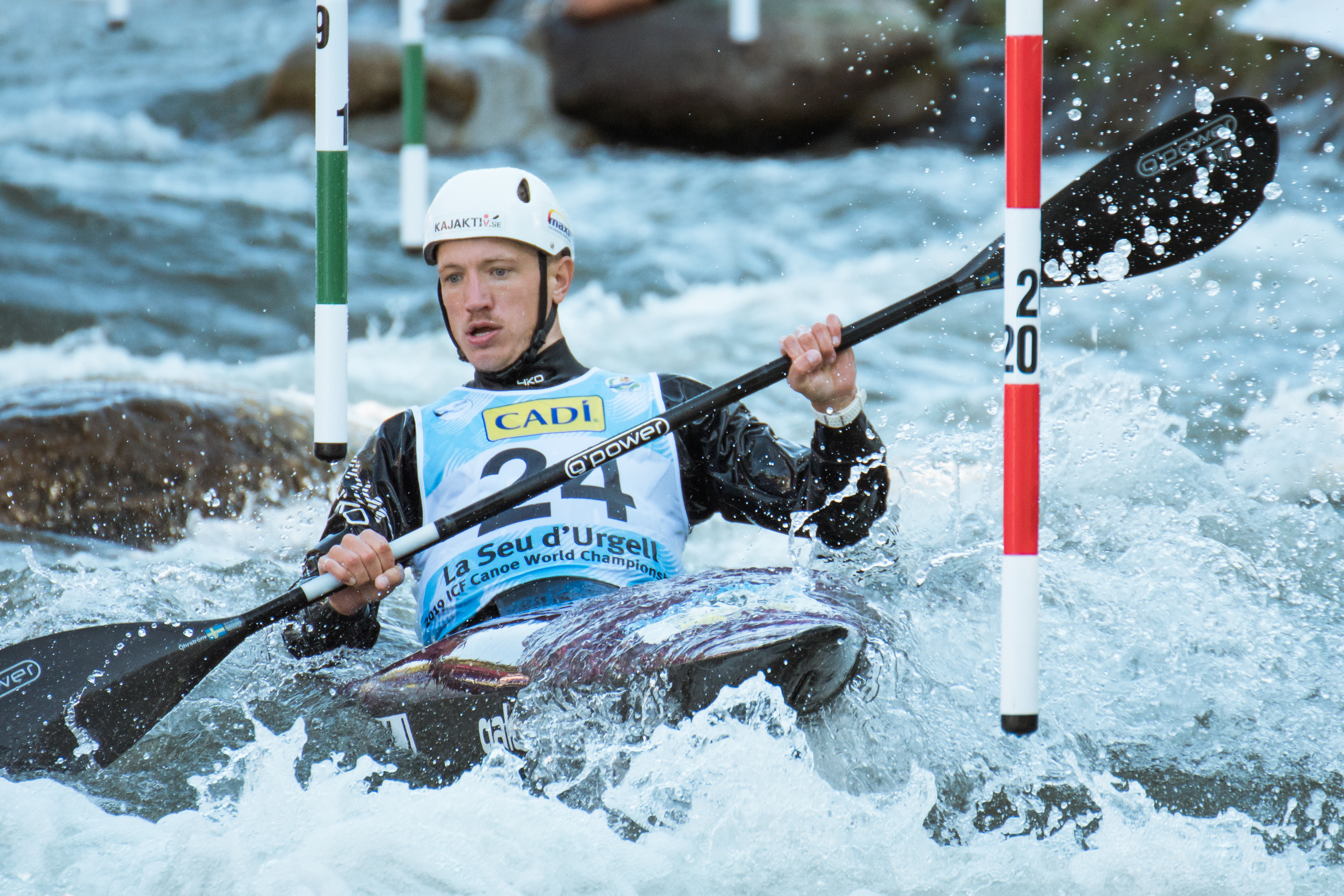
- Isak Öhrström during the 2019 Canoe slalom World Championships.

Personal information
- Nationality: Swedish
- Born: 26 November 1990 (age 35)

Sport
- Country: Sweden
- Sport: Canoe slalom
- Event: K1, Kayak cross

Isak Öhrström (born 26 November 1990) is a Swedish slalom canoeist and who has competed at the international level since 2006, specializing in K1 and kayak cross.

He is a two-time Olympian. At the 2016 Summer Olympics in Rio de Janeiro he became the first Swedish athlete in history to compete in the Olympic Games in canoe slalom. He finished in 15th place in the K1 event. He also competed at the 2024 Summer Olympics in Paris, finishing 12th in the K1 event and 28th in kayak cross.

At the 2019 World Championships in La Seu d'Urgell he qualified a nation quota for the Tokyo Olympic Games for Sweden. He did not, however, represent Sweden at the 2020 Summer Olympics.

Isak has been in several World Cup finals, including Prague 2015, Tacen 2016 and Tacen 2020 where he took the first ever world cup medal for Sweden with a gold.

In 2008 as he made it to the final of the K1 event at the World Junior Championships in Roudnice nad Labem.

== World Cup individual podiums ==
Season	Date	Venue	Position	Event
2020	17 October 2020	Tacen	1st	K1
2022	26 June 2022	Tacen	1st	Kayak cross
