= Sideris Tasiadis =

German slalom canoeist of Greek descent (born 1990)

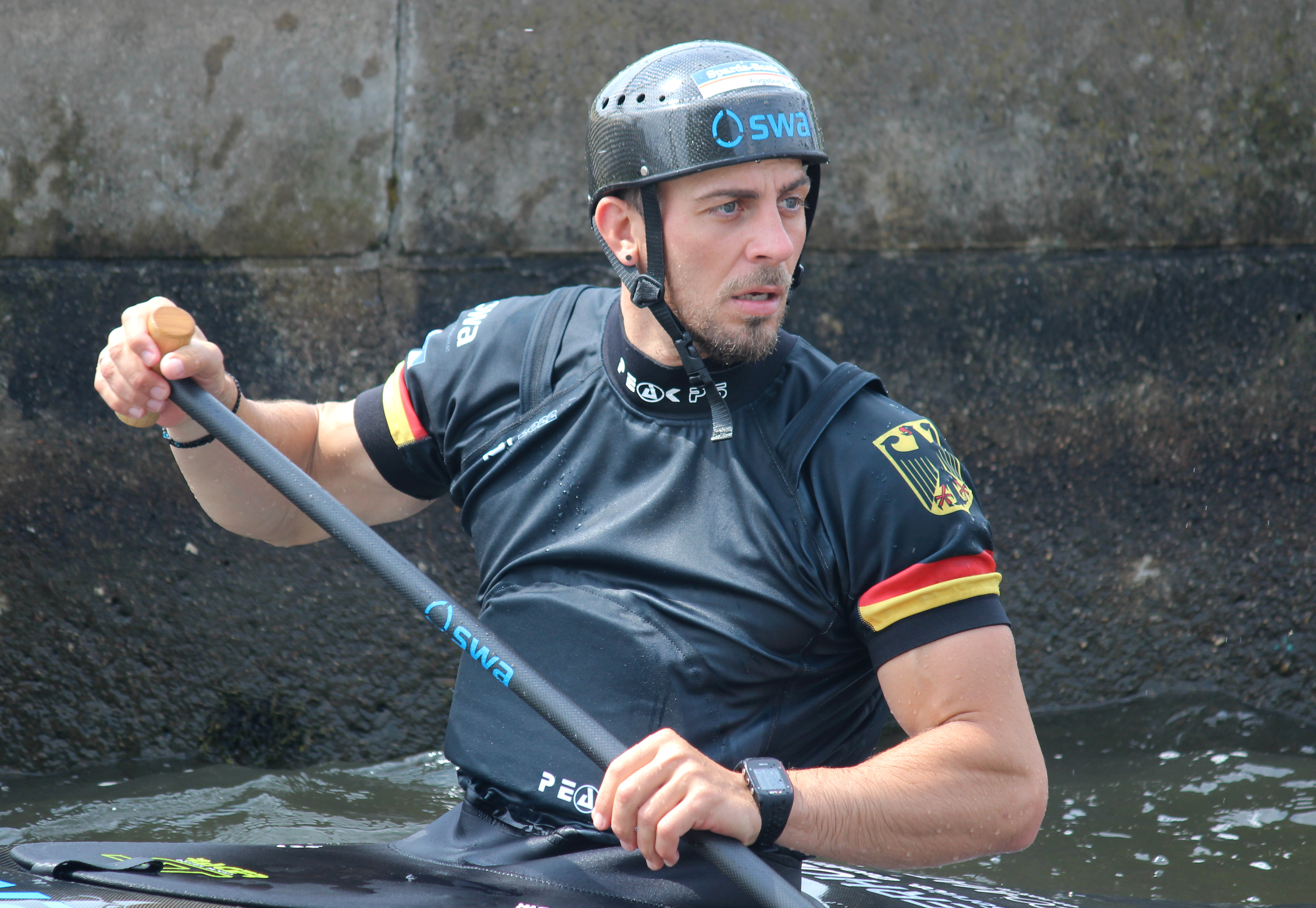
- Tasiadis in 2023

Personal information
- Nationality: German
- Born: 7 May 1990 (age 36) Augsburg, West Germany
- Height: 1.79 m (5 ft 10 in)
- Weight: 79 kg (174 lb)

Sport
- Country: Germany
- Sport: Canoe slalom
- Event: C1
- Club: Kanu Schwaben Augsburg
Medal record
Men's canoe slalom
Representing Germany
Olympic Games
Silver medal – second place	2012 London	C1
Bronze medal – third place	2020 Tokyo	C1
World Championships
Gold medal – first place	2022 Augsburg	C1
Silver medal – second place	2010 Tacen	C1 team
Silver medal – second place	2011 Bratislava	C1 team
Silver medal – second place	2013 Prague	C1 team
Silver medal – second place	2015 London	C1 team
Bronze medal – third place	2018 Rio de Janeiro	C1
Bronze medal – third place	2026 Oklahoma City	C1 team
European Games
Gold medal – first place	2023 Kraków	C1 team
European Championships
Gold medal – first place	2012 Augsburg	C1
Gold medal – first place	2017 Tacen	C1 team
Gold medal – first place	2022 Liptovský Mikuláš	C1 team
Silver medal – second place	2011 La Seu d'Urgel	C1 team
Silver medal – second place	2012 Augsburg	C1 team
Silver medal – second place	2013 Kraków	C1
Silver medal – second place	2013 Kraków	C1 team
Silver medal – second place	2015 Markkleeberg	C1
Silver medal – second place	2022 Liptovský Mikuláš	C1
Bronze medal – third place	2009 Nottingham	C1 team
Bronze medal – third place	2019 Pau	C1
Bronze medal – third place	2021 Ivrea	C1
U23 European Championships
Gold medal – first place	2010 Markkleeberg	C1 team
Junior World Championships
Gold medal – first place	2006 Solkan	C1 team
Gold medal – first place	2008 Roudnice nad Labem	C1
Bronze medal – third place	2006 Solkan	C1
Bronze medal – third place	2008 Roudnice nad Labem	C1 team
Junior European Championships
Gold medal – first place	2007 Kraków	C1
Gold medal – first place	2007 Kraków	C1 team
Gold medal – first place	2008 Solkan	C1
Gold medal – first place	2008 Solkan	C1 team
Bronze medal – third place	2005 Kraków	C1 team

Sideris Tasiadis (born 7 May 1990) is a German slalom canoeist of Greek descent who has competed at the international level since 2005. He is the son of Greek immigrants who lived in Thrace, Greece in the village of Komara for 10 years during his childhood, before moving back to Germany.

== Career ==
Tasiadis is a four-time Olympian. In 2012, he won a silver medal in the men's C1 at the 2012 Summer Olympics in London behind Tony Estanguet (FRA) and beating two-time Olympic champion Michal Martikán (SVK). He finished fifth in the C1 event four years later at the 2016 Summer Olympics in Rio de Janeiro. Tasiadis earned a second Olympic medal in the C1 event by finishing third at the delayed 2020 Summer Olympics in Tokyo. He finished 4th in the C1 event at the 2024 Summer Olympics in Paris.

He also won seven medals at the ICF Canoe Slalom World Championships with one gold (C1: 2022), four silvers (C1 team: 2010, 2011, 2013, 2015) and two bronzes (C1: 2018, C1 team: 2026).

Tasiadis won 13 medals at the European Championships (4 golds, 6 silvers and 3 bronzes), including a gold in the C1 team event at the 2023 European Games in Kraków.

Tasiadis won the overall World Cup title in the C1 class in 2013 and 2017. He is currently the No. 1-ranked athlete by the ICF, having held that position since 2018.

== World Cup individual podiums ==
	1st place, gold medalist(s)	2nd place, silver medalist(s)	3rd place, bronze medalist(s)	Total
C1	7	4	3	14

Season	Date	Venue	Position	Event
2009	12 July 2009	Augsburg	2nd	C1
2010	4 July 2010	Augsburg	3rd	C1
2013	29 June 2013	Augsburg	3rd	C1
2013	6 July 2013	La Seu d'Urgell	3rd	C1
2017	18 June 2017	Prague	1st	C1
2017	25 June 2017	Augsburg	2nd	C1
2017	2 July 2017	Markkleeberg	2nd	C1
2017	3 September 2017	Ivrea	1st	C1
2018	23 June 2018	Liptovský Mikuláš	1st	C1
2018	7 July 2018	Augsburg	1st	C1
2018	1 September 2018	Tacen	1st	C1
2019	15 June 2019	Lee Valley	1st	C1
2021	20 Jun 2021	Markkleeberg	2nd	C1
2023	3 June 2023	Augsburg	1st	C1

== Personal life ==
Tasiadis dated slalom canoeist Claudia Bär until her death in 2015 after a two-year battle with leukemia.
