= Canoeing at the 2016 Summer Olympics – Men's slalom C-1 =

Men's canoe slalom C-1 at the Games of the XXXI Olympiad
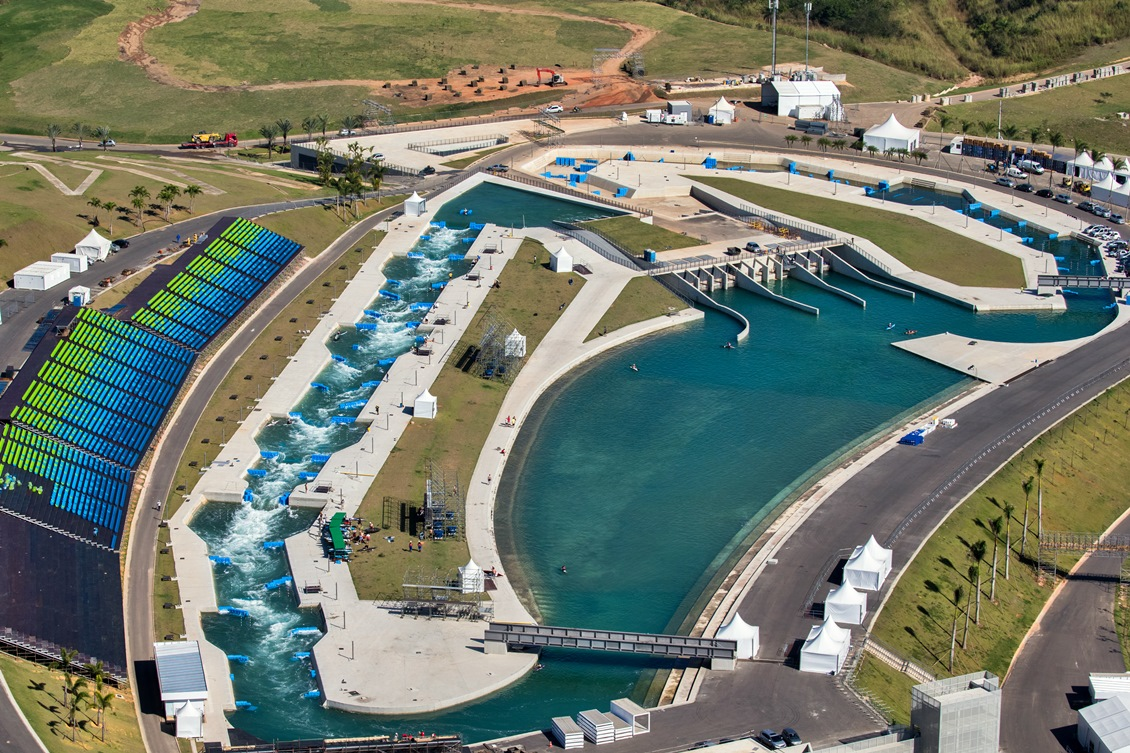
- Aerial view of the Olympic Whitewater Stadium, where the Men's canoe slalom C-1 took place.
- Venue: Olympic Whitewater Stadium
- Date: 7–9 August 2016
- Competitors: 19 from 19 nations
- Winning time: 94.17 s

Medalists
1st place, gold medalist(s)		Denis Gargaud Chanut	France
2nd place, silver medalist(s)		Matej Beňuš	Slovakia
3rd place, bronze medalist(s)		Takuya Haneda	Japan

The men's canoe slalom C-1 competition at the 2016 Olympic Games in Rio de Janeiro took place between 7 and 9 August at the Olympic Whitewater Stadium.

The gold medal was won by Denis Gargaud Chanut of France.

== Schedule ==
All times are Brasília Time (UTC−3).

Date	Time	Round
Sunday, 7 August 2016	13:30	Heats
Tuesday, 9 August 2016	13:30	Semi-final
Tuesday, 9 August 2016	15:16	Final

Slalom gate positions for Heats, 7–8 August.

Slalom gate positions for Semi-Finals and Finals, 9–11 August.

== C-1 slalom men ==
Order	Name	Preliminary Heats						Semifinal			Final		
Order	Name	1st Ride	Pen.	2nd Ride	Pen.	Best	Order	Time	Pen.	Order	Time	Pen.	Order
1st place, gold medalist(s)	Denis Gargaud Chanut (FRA)	102.03	4	93.48	2	93.48	2	98.06	0	3	94.17	0	1
2nd place, silver medalist(s)	Matej Beňuš (SVK)	95.05	0	96.78	6	95.05	6	100.68	0	8	95.02	0	2
3rd place, bronze medalist(s)	Takuya Haneda (JPN)	98.69	2	94.58	0	94.58	5	98.84	0	6	97.44	0	3
4	Vítězslav Gebas (CZE)	109.92	4	102.78	0	102.78	14	98.77	0	5	97.57	0	4
5	Sideris Tasiadis (GER)	100.47	2	92.23	0	92.23	1	95.63	0	1	97.90	2	5
6	Benjamin Savšek (SLO)	99.69	4	94.36	0	94.36	4	98.70	0	4	99.36	4	6
7	Casey Eichfeld (USA)	100.02	2	101.23	0	100.02	12	101.23	2	10	99.69	4	7
8	Ander Elosegi (ESP)	97.33	2	102.39	2	97.33	8	97.93	0	2	101.27	4	8
9	José Carvalho (POR)	111.01	4	99.18	4	99.18	11	101.04	0	9	105.74	4	9
10	David Florence (GBR)	94.11	0	DNS	-	94.11	3	99.36	0	7	109.00	4	10
11	Ian Borrows (AUS)	97.40	0	151.77	52	97.40	9	101.32	0	11	did not advance		
12	Grzegorz Hedwig (POL)	96.67	0	97.72	2	96.67	7	102.70	4	12	did not advance		
13	Alexander Lipatov (RUS)	101.78	0	98.72	4	98.72	10	104.69	0	13	did not advance		
14	Shu Jianming (CHN)	110.19	4	100.68	2	100.68	13	108.73	0	14	did not advance		
15	Cameron Smedley (CAN)	104.93	4	104.83	4	104.83	15	did not advance					
16	Felipe Borges (BRA)	122.30	14	105.14	0	105.14	16	did not advance					
17	Sebastián Rossi (ARG)	108.81	8	155.70	52	108.81	17	did not advance					
18	Jean-Pierre Bourhis (SEN)	110.94	2	109.27	2	109.27	18	did not advance					
19	Richard Merjan (LIB)	120.20	6	121.67	12	120.20	19	did not advance					
