= Wu Shao-hsuan =

Taiwanese canoeist (born 1997)

Personal information
- Born: 25 November 1997 (age 28) Taiwan

Sport
- Sport: Canoe slalom
- Event: K1, Kayak cross
- Club: Taichung City
Medal record
Men's canoe slalom
Representing Chinese Taipei
Asian Games
Bronze medal – third place	2022 Hangzhou	K1
Asian Championships
Gold medal – first place	2017 Nakhon Nayok	K1 team

Wu Shao-hsuan (born 25 November 1997) is a Taiwanese slalom canoeist who has competed at the international level since 2013, specializing in K1 and kayak cross.

He competed at the 2024 Summer Olympics, finishing 23rd in both the K1 event and kayak cross.
