= Canoeing at the 2024 Summer Olympics – Men's slalom kayak cross =

Men's slalom kayak cross at the Games of the XXXIII Olympiad
- Venue: National Olympic Nautical Stadium of Île-de-France, Vaires-sur-Marne
- Dates: 2 August 2024 (time trial); 3 August 2024 (round 1 and repechage); 4 August 2024 (heats); 5 August 2024 (quarterfinal, semifinal, and final)

Medalists
1st place, gold medalist(s)		Finn Butcher	New Zealand
2nd place, silver medalist(s)		Joseph Clarke	Great Britain
3rd place, bronze medalist(s)		Noah Hegge	Germany

The men's kayak cross slalom canoeing event at the 2024 Summer Olympics took place 2 August to 5 August 2024 at the National Olympic Nautical Stadium of Île-de-France in Vaires-sur-Marne.

== Background ==
This will be the inaugural appearance of the event.

== Competition format ==
The kayak cross event begins with a time trial to determine each canoeist's seeding for round 1 of the competition.

Round 1 features a series of 11 races with three or four competitors each. The top two in each race will advance to the heats, while the rest will move to the repechage.

The repechage features five races with the same format as round 1. In each race the top two competitors will advance to the heats, while the rest are eliminated.

The heats feature 8 races with four competitors each. The top two in each heat will advance to the quarterfinals, the top two in each of the quarterfinal races will advance to the semifinals, and the top two in each of the semifinal races will advance to the finals.

== Schedule ==
All times are Central European Summer Time (UTC+2)

The men's kayak cross slalom will take place over four days.

Date	Time	Round
2 August 2024	15:30	Time trial
3 August 2024	16:40; 18:45	Round 1 Repechage
4 August 2024	15:30	Heats
5 August 2024	15:52; 16:28; 16:48	Quarterfinal; Semifinal; Final

== Results ==
=== Time Trial ===
Time Trial
Rank	Bib	Canoeist	Time	Notes
1	1	Joseph Clarke (GBR)	66.08	
2	11	Pedro Gonçalves (BRA)	66.41	
3	13	Titouan Castryck (FRA)	67.29	
4	2	Boris Neveu (FRA)	67.48	
5	3	Giovanni De Gennaro (ITA)	67.71	
6	6	Finn Butcher (NZL)	67.74	
7	5	Felix Oschmautz (AUT)	67.87	
8	18	Noah Hegge (GER)	68.01	
9	14	Mateusz Polaczyk (POL)	68.11	
10	8	Manuel Ochoa (ESP)	68.66	
11	16	Miquel Travé (ESP)	68.70	
12	24	Salim Jemai (TUN)	68.91	
13	17	Quan Xin (CHN)	69.13	
14	22	Noel Hendrick (IRL)	69.31	
15	23	Lukáš Rohan (CZE)	69.80	
16	12	Isak Öhrström (SWE)	70.29	
17	15	Mathis Soudi (MAR)	70.53	
18	33	Liam Jegou (IRL)	70.81	
19	27	Jakub Grigar (SVK)	71.18	
20	9	Timothy Anderson (AUS)	71.41	
21	32	Jiří Prskavec (CZE)	71.71	
22	19	Tristan Carter (AUS)	72.94	
23	25	Matej Beňuš (SVK)	73.54	
24	10	Alex Baldoni (CAN)	73.70	
25	35	Benjamin Savšek (SLO)	74.18	
26	30	Adam Burgess (GBR)	74.66	
27	34	Matija Marinić (CRO)	74.80	
28	4	Martin Dougoud (SUI)	74.89	
29	29	Joris Otten (NED)	75.95	
30	21	Andy Barat (COM)	76.95	
31	31	Yves Bourhis (SEN)	78.15	
32	28	Amir Rezanejad (EOR)	79.15	
33	37	Casey Eichfeld (USA)	81.13	
34	20	Yuuki Tanaka (JPN)	81.35	
35	38	Grzegorz Hedwig (POL)	81.42	
36	36	Wu Shao-hsuan (TPE)	82.73	
37	26	Peter Kauzer (SLO)	70.74	FLT (8)
38	7	Stefan Hengst (GER)	69.67	FLT (6)

=== Round 1 ===
Proceed to Heats
Proceed to Repechage

Race 1
Rank	Bib	Canoeist	Notes
1	1	Joseph Clarke (GBR)	
2	12	Salim Jemai (TUN)	
3	33	Casey Eichfeld (USA)	FLT (2)

Race 2
Rank	Bib	Canoeist	Notes
1	13	Quan Xin (CHN)	
2	2	Pedro Gonçalves (BRA)	FLT (S)
3	32	Amir Rezanejad (EOR)	FLT (6,7,8)

Race 3
Rank	Bib	Canoeist	Notes
1	3	Titouan Castryck (FRA)	
2	31	Yves Bourhis (SEN)	
3	14	Noel Hendrick (IRL)	

Race 4
Rank	Bib	Canoeist	Notes
1	4	Boris Neveu (FRA)	
2	15	Lukáš Rohan (CZE)	
3	30	Andy Barat (COM)	

Race 5
Rank	Bib	Canoeist	Notes
1	5	Giovanni De Gennaro (ITA)	
2	16	Isak Öhrström (SWE)	
3	29	Joris Otten (NED)	

Race 6
Rank	Bib	Canoeist	Notes
1	6	Finn Butcher (NZL)	
2	28	Martin Dougoud (SUI)	
3	17	Mathis Soudi (MAR)	

Race 7
Rank	Bib	Canoeist	Notes
1	7	Felix Oschmautz (AUT)	
2	38	Stefan Hengst (GER)	
3	27	Matija Marinić (CRO)	FLT (3)
4	18	Liam Jegou (IRL)	FLT (2,8)

Race 8
Rank	Bib	Canoeist	Notes
1	8	Noah Hegge (GER)	
2	19	Jakub Grigar (SVK)	
3	37	Peter Kauzer (SLO)	
4	26	Adam Burgess (GBR)	

Race 9
Rank	Bib	Canoeist	Notes
1	20	Timothy Anderson (AUS)	
2	9	Mateusz Polaczyk (POL)	
3	36	Wu Shao-hsuan (TPE)	
4	25	Benjamin Savšek (SLO)	FLT (2)

Race 10
Rank	Bib	Canoeist	Notes
1	10	Manuel Ochoa (ESP)	
2	24	Alex Baldoni (CAN)	
3	21	Jiří Prskavec (CZE)	FLT (8)
4	35	Grzegorz Hedwig (POL)	FLT (3)

Race 11
Rank	Bib	Canoeist	Notes
1	11	Miquel Travé (ESP)	
2	34	Yuuki Tanaka (JPN)	
3	23	Matej Beňuš (SVK)	
4	22	Tristan Carter (AUS)	FLT (1)

=== Repechages ===
Proceed to Heats
Eliminated

Race 1
Rank	Bib	Canoeist	Notes
1	14	Noel Hendrick (IRL)	
2	36	Wu Shao-hsuan (TPE)	
3	23	Matej Beňuš (SVK)	FLT (2)

Race 2
Rank	Bib	Canoeist	Notes
1	35	Grzegorz Hedwig (POL)	
2	25	Benjamin Savšek (SLO)	
3	17	Mathis Soudi (MAR)	FLT (S)

Race 3
Rank	Bib	Canoeist	Notes
1	18	Liam Jegou (IRL)	
2	26	Adam Burgess (GBR)	
3	33	Casey Eichfeld (USA)	

Race 4
Rank	Bib	Canoeist	Notes
1	21	Jiří Prskavec (CZE)	
2	27	Matija Marinić (CRO)	
3	32	Amir Rezanejad (EOR)	

Race 5
Rank	Bib	Canoeist	Notes
1	22	Tristan Carter (AUS)	
2	37	Peter Kauzer (SLO)	
3	29	Joris Otten (NED)	
4	30	Andy Barat (COM)	FLT (8)

=== Heats ===
Proceed to Quarterfinals
Eliminated

Heat 1
Rank	Bib	Canoeist	Notes
1	1	Joseph Clarke (GBR)	
2	17	Jakub Grigar (SVK)	
3	32	Peter Kauzer (SLO)	
4	16	Isak Öhrström (SWE)	FLT (6)

Heat 2
Rank	Bib	Canoeist	Notes
1	8	Manuel Ochoa (ESP)	
2	25	Jiří Prskavec (CZE)	
3	24	Liam Jegou (IRL)	
4	9	Miquel Travé (ESP)	FLT (8)

Heat 3
Rank	Bib	Canoeist	Notes
1	5	Finn Butcher (NZL)	
2	28	Benjamin Savšek (SLO)	
3	21	Yuuki Tanaka (JPN)	FLT (8)
4	12	Pedro Gonçalves (BRA)	FLT (2)

Heat 4
Rank	Bib	Canoeist	Notes
1	4	Giovanni De Gennaro (ITA)	
2	13	Mateusz Polaczyk (POL)	
3	20	Yves Bourhis (SEN)	
4	29	Adam Burgess (GBR)	

Heat 5
Rank	Bib	Canoeist	Notes
1	3	Boris Neveu (FRA)	
2	19	Martin Dougoud (SUI)	
3	14	Salim Jemai (TUN)	
4	30	Matija Marinić (CRO)	FLT (R)

Heat 6
Rank	Bib	Canoeist	Notes
1	11	Timothy Anderson (AUS)	
2	27	Grzegorz Hedwig (POL)	
3	6	Felix Oschmautz (AUT)	
4	22	Stefan Hengst (GER)	

Heat 7
Rank	Bib	Canoeist	Notes
1	7	Noah Hegge (GER)	
2	26	Tristan Carter (AUS)	
3	23	Noel Hendrick (IRL)	
4	10	Quan Xin (CHN)	FLT (8)

Heat 8
Rank	Bib	Canoeist	Notes
1	2	Titouan Castryck (FRA)	
2	15	Lukáš Rohan (CZE)	
3	31	Wu Shao-hsuan (TPE)	
4	18	Alex Baldoni (CAN)	

=== Quarterfinals ===
Proceed to Semifinals
Eliminated

Quarterfinal 1
Rank	Bib	Canoeist	Notes
1	1	Joseph Clarke (GBR)	
2	17	Jakub Grigar (SVK)	
3	25	Jiří Prskavec (CZE)	
4	8	Manuel Ochoa (ESP)	FLT (8)

Quarterfinal 2
Rank	Bib	Canoeist	Notes
1	5	Finn Butcher (NZL)	
2	13	Mateusz Polaczyk (POL)	
3	28	Benjamin Savšek (SLO)	
4	4	Giovanni De Gennaro (ITA)	

Quarterfinal 3
Rank	Bib	Canoeist	Notes
1	3	Boris Neveu (FRA)	
2	19	Martin Dougoud (SUI)	
3	11	Timothy Anderson (AUS)	
4	27	Grzegorz Hedwig (POL)	

Quarterfinal 4
Rank	Bib	Canoeist	Notes
1	7	Noah Hegge (GER)	
2	15	Lukáš Rohan (CZE)	
3	2	Titouan Castryck (FRA)	FLT (3)
4	26	Tristan Carter (AUS)	FLT (R,6,8)

=== Semifinals ===
Proceed to Finals
Eliminated

Semifinal 1
Rank	Bib	Canoeist	Notes
1	1	Joseph Clarke (GBR)	
2	5	Finn Butcher (NZL)	
3	17	Jakub Grigar (SVK)	
4	13	Mateusz Polaczyk (POL)	

Semifinal 2
Rank	Bib	Canoeist	Notes
1	7	Noah Hegge (GER)	
2	15	Lukáš Rohan (CZE)	
3	3	Boris Neveu (FRA)	
4	19	Martin Dougoud (SUI)	FLT (6)

=== Finals ===
Final
Rank	Bib	Canoeist	Notes
1st place, gold medalist(s)	5	Finn Butcher (NZL)	
2nd place, silver medalist(s)	1	Joseph Clarke (GBR)	
3rd place, bronze medalist(s)	7	Noah Hegge (GER)	
4	15	Lukáš Rohan (CZE)	

Small Final
Rank	Bib	Canoeist	Notes
1	19	Martin Dougoud (SUI)	
2	17	Jakub Grigar (SVK)	
3	3	Boris Neveu (FRA)	
4	13	Mateusz Polaczyk (POL)	FLT (1)

=== Final Ranking ===
Final Ranking
Rank	Bib	Canoeist
1st place, gold medalist(s)	5	Finn Butcher (NZL)
2nd place, silver medalist(s)	1	Joseph Clarke (GBR)
3rd place, bronze medalist(s)	7	Noah Hegge (GER)
4	15	Lukáš Rohan (CZE)
5	19	Martin Dougoud (SUI)
6	17	Jakub Grigar (SVK)
7	3	Boris Neveu (FRA)
8	13	Mateusz Polaczyk (POL)
9	2	Titouan Castryck (FRA)
10	11	Timothy Anderson (AUS)
11	25	Jiří Prskavec (CZE)
12	28	Benjamin Savšek (SLO)
13	4	Giovanni De Gennaro (ITA)
14	8	Manuel Ochoa (ESP)
15	26	Tristan Carter (AUS)
16	27	Grzegorz Hedwig (POL)
17	5	Felix Oschmautz (AUT)
18	24	Salim Jemai (TUN)
19	31	Yves Bourhis (SEN)
20	20	Yuuki Tanaka (JPN)
21	22	Noel Hendrick (IRL)
22	33	Liam Jegou (IRL)
23	23	Wu Shao-hsuan (TPE)
24	26	Peter Kauzer (SLO)
25	16	Miquel Travé (ESP)
26	13	Quan Xin (CHN)
27	11	Pedro Gonçalves (BRA)
28	12	Isak Öhrström (SWE)
29	10	Alex Baldoni (CAN)
30	7	Stefan Hengst (GER)
31	30	Adam Burgess (GBR)
32	34	Matija Marinić (CRO)
33	33	Mathis Soudi (MAR)
34	25	Matej Beňuš (SVK)
35	35	Joris Otten (NED)
36	36	Amir Rezanejad (EOR)
37	37	Casey Eichfeld (USA)
38	38	Andy Barat (COM)
