= Canoeing at the 2024 Summer Olympics – Men's slalom K-1 =

Men's slalom K-1 at the Games of the XXXIII Olympiad
- Venue: National Olympic Nautical Stadium of Île-de-France, Vaires-sur-Marne
- Dates: 30 July 2024 (heats); 1 August 2024 (semifinal & final)
- Winning time: 88.22

Medalists
1st place, gold medalist(s)		Giovanni De Gennaro	Italy
2nd place, silver medalist(s)		Titouan Castryck	France
3rd place, bronze medalist(s)		Pau Echaniz	Spain

The men's K-1 slalom canoeing event at the 2024 Summer Olympics will take place on 30 July and 1 August 2024 at the National Olympic Nautical Stadium of Île-de-France in Vaires-sur-Marne.

Jiří Prskavec was the defending 2020 Olympic champion, but he was placed eighth.

== Background ==
This will the 10th appearance of the event, having previously appeared in every Summer Olympics with slalom canoeing: 1972 and 1992–2020.

== Competition format ==
Slalom canoeing uses a three-round format, with heats, semifinal, and final. In the heats, each canoeist has two runs at the course with the better time counting. The top 20 advance to the semifinal. In the semifinal, the canoeists get a single run; the top 10 advance to the final. The best time in the single-run final wins gold. The canoe course is approximately 250 metres long, with up to 25 gates that the canoeist must pass in the correct direction. Penalty time is added for infractions such as passing on the wrong side or touching a gate. Runs typically last approximately 95 seconds.

== Schedule ==
All times are Central European Summer Time (UTC+2)

The men's slalom K-1 will take place over two days.

Date	Time	Round
30 July 2024	16:00	Heats
1 August 2024	15:30; 17:30	Semifinal; Final

== Results ==
Rank	Bib	Canoeist	Nation	Preliminary Heats						Semifinal			Final		
Rank	Bib	Canoeist	Nation	1st Ride	Pen.	2nd Ride	Pen.	Best	Order	Time	Pen.	Order	Time	Pen.	Order
1st place, gold medalist(s)	2	Giovanni De Gennaro	Italy	88.46	2	85.34	0	85.34	3	93.47	2	8	88.22	0	1
2nd place, silver medalist(s)	6	Titouan Castryck	France	83.71	0	80.09	0	80.09	1	91.56	4	3	88.42	0	2
3rd place, bronze medalist(s)	15	Pau Echaniz	Spain	87.84	2	88.37	2	87.84	12	96.11	2	12	88.87	2	3
4	5	Martin Dougoud	Switzerland	86.30	0	138.24	52	86.30	6	93.07	0	7	89.44	0	4
5	3	Joseph Clarke	Great Britain	136.89	50	85.62	2	85.62	4	89.51	0	1	89.82	0	5
6	11	Jakub Grigar	Slovakia	87.10	0	91.80	4	87.10	9	94.00	4	5	90.21	0	6
7	9	Timothy Anderson	Australia	88.37	0	85.78	2	85.78	5	94.95	2	10	90.90	2	7
8	1	Jiří Prskavec	Czech Republic	83.74	0	84.90	2	83.74	2	92.53	2	6	91.74	4	8
9	12	Noah Hegge	Germany	87.67	2	87.15	0	87.15	10	91.24	2	2	93.73	4	9
10	7	Felix Oschmautz	Austria	90.07	4	92.40	4	90.07	18	91.83	0	4	94.21	4	10
11	8	Quan Xin	China	87.23	0	89.80	2	87.23	11	95.95	2	11	94.75	2	11
12	16	Isak Öhrström	Sweden	89.43	2	135.55	50	89.43	15	94.69	2	9	147.39	52	12
13	13	Mateusz Polaczyk	Poland	87.89	0	139.58	52	87.89	13	98.49	6	13	Did not advance		
14	20	Yuuki Tanaka	Japan	103.21	12	91.78	2	91.78	20	101.90	4	14	Did not advance		
15	17	Noel Hendrick	Ireland	98.64	10	90.68	2	90.68	19	102.46	4	15	Did not advance		
16	14	Mathis Soudi	Morocco	89.90	0	89.45	2	89.45	16	104.11	8	16	Did not advance		
17	23	Salim Jemai	Tunisia	101.11	6	90.03	0	90.03	17	106.68	2	17	Did not advance		
18	4	Peter Kauzer	Slovenia	90.93	2	88.84	2	88.84	14	142.80	50	18	Did not advance		
19	10	Finn Butcher	New Zealand	86.35	0	142.08	54	86.35	7	146.40	56	19	Did not advance		
20	18	Pepe Gonçalves	Brazil	86.64	0	90.71	4	86.64	8	147.09	56	20	Did not advance		
21	19	Alex Baldoni	Canada	95.18	2	97.25	4	95.18	21	Did not advance					
22	24	Yves Bourhis	Senegal	150.11	56	97.85	2	97.85	22	Did not advance					
23	21	Wu Shao-hsuan	Chinese Taipei	101.22	6	99.45	2	99.45	23	Did not advance					
24	22	Andy Barat	Comoros	105.82	4	107.59	2	105.82	24	Did not advance					
