= Matej Beňuš =

Slovak canoeist (born 1987)

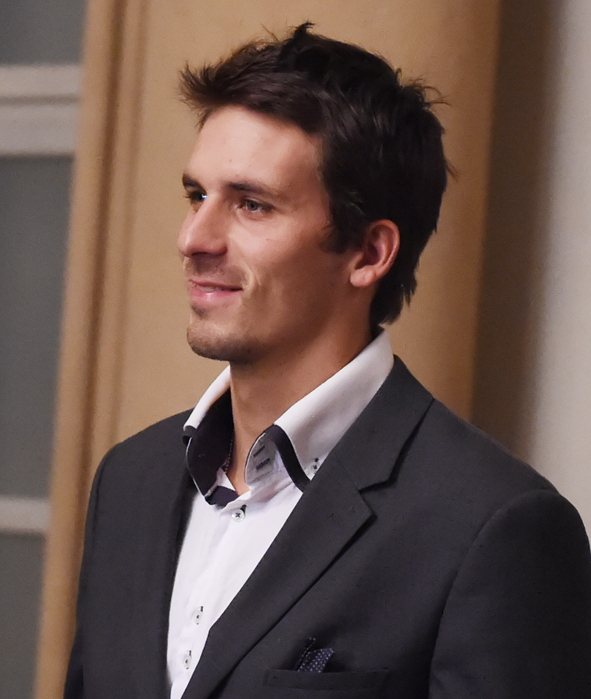
- Beňuš in 2015

Personal information
- Nationality: Slovak
- Born: 2 November 1987 (age 38) Bratislava, Slovak SR, Czechoslovakia
- Height: 1.96 m (6 ft 5 in)
- Weight: 83 kg (183 lb)

Sport
- Country: Slovakia
- Sport: Canoe slalom
- Event: C1
- Club: ŠCP Bratislava
Medal record
Men's canoe slalom
Representing Slovakia
Event	1st	2nd	3rd
Olympic Games	0	1	1
World Championships	9	1	2
European Games	0	1	0
European Championships	8	3	4
U23 European Championships	1	2	2
Junior World Championships	0	2	0
Junior European Championships	1	0	0
Total	19	10	9
Olympic Games
Silver medal – second place	2016 Rio de Janeiro	C1
Bronze medal – third place	2024 Paris	C1
World Championships
Gold medal – first place	2009 La Seu d'Urgell	C1 team
Gold medal – first place	2010 Tacen	C1 team
Gold medal – first place	2011 Bratislava	C1 team
Gold medal – first place	2013 Prague	C1 team
Gold medal – first place	2014 Deep Creek Lake	C1 team
Gold medal – first place	2015 London	C1 team
Gold medal – first place	2017 Pau	C1 team
Gold medal – first place	2018 Rio de Janeiro	C1 team
Gold medal – first place	2019 La Seu d'Urgell	C1 team
Silver medal – second place	2022 Augsburg	C1 team
Bronze medal – third place	2011 Bratislava	C1
Bronze medal – third place	2021 Bratislava	C1 team
European Games
Silver medal – second place	2023 Kraków	C1 team
European Championships
Gold medal – first place	2007 Liptovský Mikuláš	C1 team
Gold medal – first place	2008 Kraków	C1 team
Gold medal – first place	2010 Bratislava	C1 team
Gold medal – first place	2012 Augsburg	C1 team
Gold medal – first place	2013 Kraków	C1 team
Gold medal – first place	2015 Markkleeberg	C1 team
Gold medal – first place	2016 Liptovský Mikuláš	C1 team
Gold medal – first place	2021 Ivrea	C1 team
Silver medal – second place	2010 Bratislava	C1
Silver medal – second place	2021 Ivrea	C1
Bronze medal – third place	2013 Kraków	C1
Bronze medal – third place	2015 Markkleeberg	C1
Bronze medal – third place	2024 Tacen	C1 team
Bronze medal – third place	2025 Vaires-sur-Marne	C1 team
U23 European Championships
Gold medal – first place	2009 Liptovský Mikuláš	C1
Silver medal – second place	2008 Solkan	C1
Silver medal – second place	2010 Markkleeberg	C1
Bronze medal – third place	2007 Kraków	C1
Bronze medal – third place	2010 Markkleeberg	C1 team
Junior World Championships
Silver medal – second place	2004 Lofer	C1
Silver medal – second place	2004 Lofer	C1 team
Junior European Championships
Gold medal – first place	2004 Kraków	C1

Matej Beňuš (born 2 November 1987) is a Slovak slalom canoeist who has competed at the international level since 2002.

A three-time Olympian, Beňuš won a silver medal in the C1 event at the 2016 Summer Olympics in Rio de Janeiro and a bronze medal in the same event at the 2024 Summer Olympics. He also won 12 medals at the ICF Canoe Slalom World Championships with nine golds (C1 team: 2009, 2010, 2011, 2013, 2014, 2015, 2017, 2018, 2019), one silver (C1 team: 2022) and two bronzes (C1: 2011, C1 team: 2021). He is a four-time overall World Cup champion in the C1 class (2010, 2015, 2019, 2024). At the European Championships he won a total of 15 medals (8 golds, 3 silvers and 4 bronzes), including a silver in the C1 team event at the 2023 European Games in Kraków.

== Career ==
=== Junior ===
His parents introduced him to this sport at a young age, and he took it up at age 11. His first major international competition was the 2002 World Junior Championships, where he finished 23rd in the C1 category. The following year he competed at the 2003 European Junior Championships, taking ninth place in the individual C1 and sixth place in the team event, with Ján Bátik and Peter Hajdu. He won his first medals in the 2004 season: gold at the European Junior Championships in Krakow in the individual C1 category and two silver medals at the World Junior Championships, in both individual and team events. The 2005 season was his last in the junior category, finishing 8th in the C1 event at the European Junior Championships and 4th in the C1 team event. In 2004, he was named the Junior of the Year and in 2005 the Talent of the Year by the Slovak Canoe Association.

=== U23 ===
He first competed in the U23 category in 2004, achieving fifth place at the European U23 Championships in C1 team with Alexander Slafkovský and Ján Bátik. Two years later, he finished fifth in individual and seventh in the team event and in 2007 he won his first medal in this category, bronze in C1 in Krakow. He added a silver medal at the 2008 European U23 Championships and gold a year later in Liptovský Mikuláš, both in individual C1 discipline. 2010 season was the last one he was eligible to start in U23 events. He won a silver medal in the individual and bronze in the team C1 competition at the 2010 European U23 Championships in Markkleeberg.

=== Senior ===
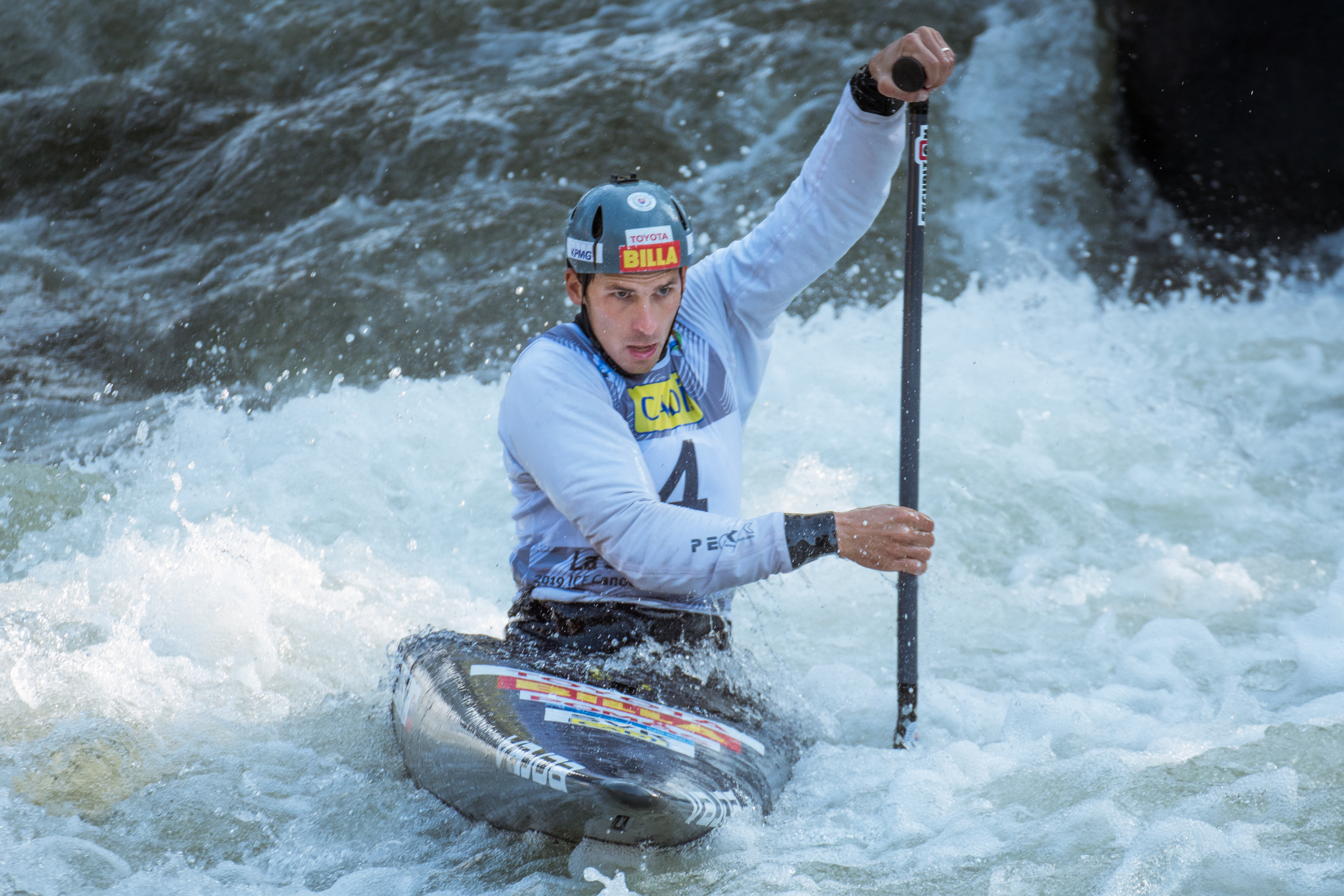
Matej Beňuš (2019)

==== C1 Individual ====
His first major international senior competition was the 2007 European Championships, where he finished 15th. He also competed at the 2007 World Championships, finishing 29th. Two years later, he managed to enter the top ten, with the sixth place at the 2009 European and fifth at the 2009 World Championships. In that season, he also achieved his first podium at the World Cup event, finishing third in Bratislava and placed fifth in the final World Cup ranking.

In 2010 he won his first individual senior medal: silver at the European Championships, when the Slovak canoeists swept all the podium positions. He also became the overall World Cup champion in C1 category. In 2011 he won his first and so far the only individual medal at the World Championships: bronze, on his home whitewater course and won his first World Cup race, placing second in the final ranking. He was also named the 2011 Canoeist of the Year by the Slovak Canoe Association. Between 2010 and 2015 he always finished in top 3 in the final rankings of the World cup, after first and second place in 2010 and 2011 respectively, he was also third in 2012, second in 2013, third again in 2014 and first in 2015. From 2013 to 2016 he always finished in top ten at major championships, with one ninth and two sixth places at the World Championships and two bronze medals (2013 and 2015) and one fifth place at the European level. In 2015, he was once again awarded the title of Slovak Canoeist of the Year. Beňuš finished the 2016 season as the World No. 1 in the C1 event.

His biggest individual success is the silver medal at the 2016 Summer Olympics, where he prolonged Slovak medal streak in this discipline (first five medals in C1 were achieved by Michal Martikán). Beňuš also competed at the 2020 Summer Olympics, finishing in 6th place in the C1 event. He won another medal at the 2024 Paris Olympics, a bronze in the C1 event. He also finished 34th in kayak cross at those games.

==== C1 Team ====
At the World Senior championships, he has been a part of Slovak team since 2009, together with Martikán and Slafkovský. They have won the gold medal at every World Championship since then, with a total of nine gold medals (surpassing the record previously held by the USA). At the European Senior Championships he first competed in the team event in 2007 with Martikán and Juraj Minčík, immediately winning the gold medal. They repeated this success next year (with Slafkovský instead of Minčík), but finished eighth in 2009. At the 2010 European Championships held in his hometown they won the gold medal again and in 2011 they finished fourth. Over the next five years they won 4 European titles together, with the exception of the 2014 season when Beňuš didn't make the national team selection.

== Career statistics ==
=== Major championships results timeline ===
Event		2007	2008	2009	2010	2011	2012	2013	2014	2015	2016	2017	2018	2019	2020	2021	2022	2023	2024	2025	2026
Olympic Games	C1	Not held	—	Not held			—	Not held			2	Not held				6	Not held		3	Not held	
Olympic Games	Kayak cross	Not held																	34	Not held	
World Championships	C1	25	Not held	15	4	3	Not held	6	9	6	Not held	13	4	16	Not held	10	5	7	Not held	5	14
World Championships	Kayak cross	Not held										—	—	—	Not held	—	60	—	Not held	—	—
World Championships	C1 team	9	Not held	1	1	1	Not held	1	1	1	Not held	1	1	1	Not held	3	2	5	Not held	9	9
European Championships	C1	15	13	6	2	19	16	3	—	3	5	5	—	34	—	2	8	12 (Note: 2023 European Games)	5	22	22
European Championships	Kayak cross	Not held														—	30	—	NQ	—	—
European Championships	Kayak cross individual	Not held																	38	—	—
European Championships	C1 team	1	1	8	1	4	1	1	—	1	1	6	—	4	—	1	4	2	3	3	6

=== World Cup individual podiums ===
	1st place, gold medalist(s)	2nd place, silver medalist(s)	3rd place, bronze medalist(s)	Total
C1	5	12	5	22

Season	Date	Venue	Position	Event
2009	5 July 2009	Bratislava	3rd	C1
2011	2 July 2011	L'Argentière-la-Bessée	1st	C1
2013	22 June 2013	Cardiff	2nd	C1
2013	29 June 2013	Augsburg	2nd	C1
2013	24 August 2013	Bratislava	3rd	C1
2014	7 June 2014	Lee Valley	2nd	C1
2014	2 August 2014	La Seu d'Urgell	2nd	C1
2014	16 August 2014	Augsburg	3rd	C1
2015	27 June 2015	Kraków	1st	C1
2015	8 August 2015	La Seu d'Urgell	2nd	C1
2015	15 August 2015	Pau	2nd	C1
2016	3 September 2016	Prague	1st	C1
2017	18 June 2017	Prague	2nd	C1
2017	25 June 2017	Augsburg	1st	C1
2017	3 September 2017	Ivrea	3rd	C1
2019	22 June 2019	Bratislava	2nd	C1
2019	7 September 2019	Prague	1st	C1
2023	3 June 2023	Augsburg	2nd	C1
2023	10 June 2023	Prague	2nd	C1
2024	15 June 2024	Kraków	2nd	C1
2025	6 September 2025	Augsburg	2nd	C1
2026	13 June 2026	Augsburg	3rd	C1

== Personal life ==
He is married, his wife's name is Ivana and they have three children, Simon, Tobias, and Sebastián. His older sister Dana Mann is also a gold medalist from the 2011 ICF Canoe Slalom World Championships in K1 team category, together with Elena Kaliská and Jana Dukátová. His mother Jana Kubovčáková won a bronze medal in the K1 team event at the 1975 ICF Canoe Slalom World Championships.

Beňuš is a practicing Roman Catholic who was raised and shaped at Salesian Youth Center in Trnávka neighbourhood of Ružinov, Bratislava.

Olympic Games
Preceded by Danka Barteková	Flagbearer for Slovakia; Tokyo 2020 together with Zuzana Rehák-Štefečeková	Succeeded by Incumbent
