= Amir Rezanejad =

Iranian canoe slalom (born 2000)

Personal information
- Full name: Amir Rezanejad Hassanjani
- Nationality: Iranian
- Born: 18 January 2000 (age 26)

Sport
- Sport: Canoe slalom

Amir Rezanejad Hassanjani (Persian: امیر رضانژاد حسنجانی; born 18 January 2000) is an Iranian slalom canoeist who has competed at the international level since 2017. He competed as part of the IOC Refugee Team at the 2024 Summer Olympics.

== Early and personal life ==
Originally from Iran, he started canoeing at the young age of 7 years-old. He initially started with flat water canoeing before switching to canoe slalom. He fled the country in 2020 by walking for 16 days and nights through the mountains which border Iran and Turkey. He eventually settled in Augsburg, Germany where he now lives and trains. He is fluent in Persian, Turkish, English and German.

== Career ==
He started his international career in 2017 and represented Iran at the 2017 ICF Canoe Slalom World Championships.

After three years away from the sport he received clearance to compete as a refugee athlete in 2023. He began to train with German coach Jurgen Koehler. He made his ICF Canoe Slalom World Cup debut in Augsburg in 2024.

He was selected to be a member of the IOC Refugee Olympic Team at the 2024 Paris Olympics, finishing 19th in the C1 event and 36th in kayak cross.
