= Timothy Anderson =

Australian canoeist (born 1994)

Tim Anderson
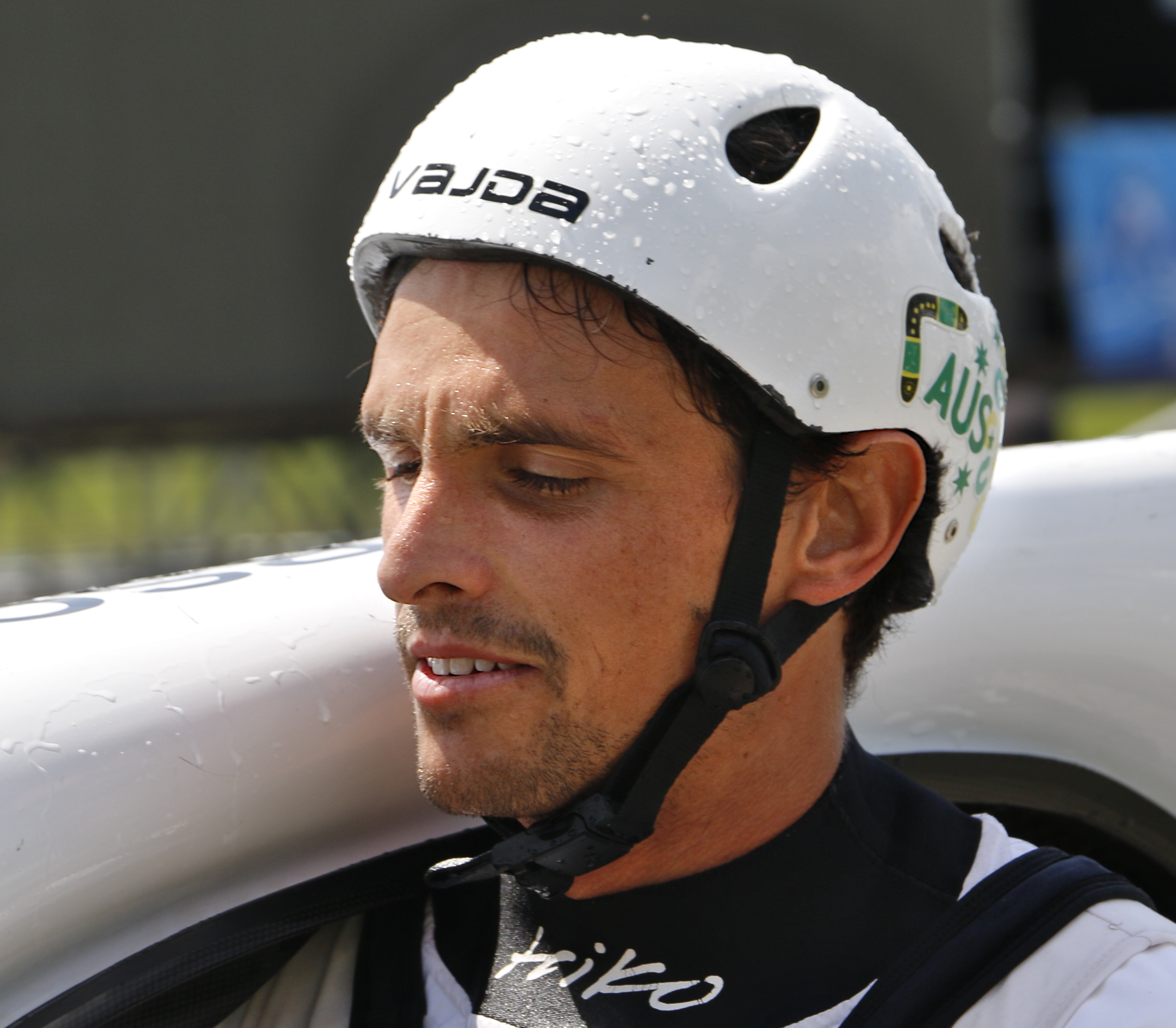
- Anderson in 2024

Personal information
- Full name: Timothy Anderson
- Nationality: Australian
- Born: 26 June 1994 (age 32) Carlton, Victoria, Australia
- Home town: Melbourne, Australia

Sport
- Country: Australia
- Sport: Canoe slalom
- Event: K1, Kayak cross
- Club: Western Sydney Whitewater Club
- Coached by: Julien Billaut
Medal record
Men's canoe slalom
Representing Australia
Oceania Championships
Bronze medal – third place	2025 Penrith	K1
Junior World Championships
Silver medal – second place	2012 Wausau	K1 team

Timothy Anderson (born 26 June 1994) is an Australian slalom canoeist who has competed at the international level since 2010. Anderson competes in the K1 and kayak cross events.

He is from Melbourne, Victoria but lives and trains in Penrith, NSW, and is coached by 2006 World Champion Julien Billaut.

== Career ==
Anderson was crowned the Oceania champion after finishing as the best-placed paddler from the region with an equal fourth at the Oceania canoe slalom titles at the Penrith Whitewater Centre early in February 2024. At the 2024 Australian Open he placed fifth in the K1, earning his place in the Olympic team, as well as winning the kayak cross event.

He competed at the 2024 Summer Olympics in Paris, finishing 7th in the K1 event and 10th in kayak cross.

Anderson earned his career best result of 5th in the K1 event at the 2023 World Championships in London, qualifying Australia a quota for the 2024 Olympics in Paris. His best result in the Kayak Cross event was 8th at the 2022 World Championships in Augsburg.

Anderson made the kayak cross quarterfinals in all five races of the 2023 World Cup to finish 3rd in the overall standings.

He won a silver medal in the K1 team event at the 2012 Junior World Championships in Wausau, Wisconsin, racing alongside Andrew Eckhardt and 2020 Olympian Daniel Watkins.

== Personal life ==
Anderson followed his brother Alastair into the sport, both learning to paddle on the Yarra River in Melbourne through the Eltham College school program. Anderson is supported by his long term partner and fellow athlete, Georgia Rankin.

Anderson completed a Bachelor of Biomedical Engineering/Bachelor of Science at the University of Sydney.

== Results ==
=== Complete World Cup results ===
Year	Class	WC1	WC2	WC3	WC4	WC5	Points	Position
2016	K1	Ivrea (Italy)	La Seu (Spain)	Pau (France)	Prague (Czech Republic); 32	Tacen (Slovenia); 31	41	50th
2017	K1	Prague (Czech Republic); 46	Augsburg (Germany); 27	Markkleeberg (Germany)	Ivrea (Italy)	La Seu (Spain)	20	58th
2018	K1	Liptovský Mikuláš (Slovakia); 25	Kraków (Poland); 49	Augsburg (Germany); 16	Tacen (Slovenia)	La Seu (Spain); 46	53	42nd
2019	K1	Lee Valley (United Kingdom); 26	Bratislava (Slovakia); 24	Tacen (Slovenia); 60	Markkleeberg (Germany)	Prague (Czech Republic); 45	46	44th
2022	K1	Prague (Czech Republic); 21	Kraków (Poland); 27	Tacen (Slovenia); 12	Pau (France); 15	La Seu (Spain); 22	151	14th
2022	Kayak cross	4	40	43	33	41	55	23rd
2023	K1	Augsburg (Germany); 21	Prague (Czech Republic); 22	Tacen (Slovenia); 7	La Seu (Spain); 8	Paris (France); 20	178	12th
2023	Kayak cross	5	12	8	12	6	161	3rd

=== Complete Championship results ===
Year	Level	Venue	Event	Result
2010	Junior World	(France) Foix	K1 team	12th
2010	Junior World	(France) Foix	K1	48th
2012	Junior World	(United States) Wausau	K1 team	2nd
2012	Junior World	(United States) Wausau	K1	16th
2013	U23 World	(Slovakia) Liptovský Mikuláš	K1 team	5th
2013	U23 World	(Slovakia) Liptovský Mikuláš	K1	41st
2014	U23 World	(Australia) Penrith	K1 team	6th
2014	U23 World	(Australia) Penrith	C1 team	10th
2014	U23 World	(Australia) Penrith	K1	30th
2015	U23 World	(Brazil) Foz do Iguaçu	K1 team	11th
2015	U23 World	(Brazil) Foz do Iguaçu	C1 team	10th
2015	U23 World	(Brazil) Foz do Iguaçu	K1	16th
2016	U23 World	(Poland) Kraków	K1 team	6th
2016	U23 World	(Poland) Kraków	K1	40th
2017	U23 World	(Slovakia) Bratislava	K1 team	10th
2017	U23 World	(Slovakia) Bratislava	K1	68th
2018	World	(Brazil) Rio de Janeiro	K1 team	10th
2018	World	(Brazil) Rio de Janeiro	K1	48th
2019	World	(Spain) La Seu d'Urgell	K1 team	8th
2019	World	(Spain) La Seu d'Urgell	K1	17th
2022	World	(Germany) Augsburg	K1 team	7th
2022	World	(Germany) Augsburg	K1	33rd
2022	World	(Germany) Augsburg	Kayak Cross	8th
2023	World	(United Kingdom) London	K1 team	9th
2023	World	(United Kingdom) London	K1	5th
2023	World	(United Kingdom) London	Kayak Cross	38th
