= Canoeing at the 2020 Summer Olympics – Men's slalom C-1 =

Olympic canoeing event

Men's slalom C-1 at the Games of the XXXII Olympiad
- Venue: Kasai Canoe Slalom Course
- Dates: 25 July 2021 (heats); 26 July 2021 (semifinal & final)
- Competitors: 18 from 18 nations

Medalists
1st place, gold medalist(s)		Benjamin Savšek	Slovenia
2nd place, silver medalist(s)		Lukáš Rohan	Czech Republic
3rd place, bronze medalist(s)		Sideris Tasiadis	Germany

The men's C-1 slalom canoeing event at the 2020 Summer Olympics took place on 25 and 26 July 2021 at the Kasai Canoe Slalom Course. 18 canoeists from 18 nations competed.

== Background ==
This was the 9th appearance of the event, having previously appeared in every Summer Olympics with slalom canoeing: 1972 and 1992–2016.

Neither reigning Olympic champion Denis Gargaud Chanut nor reigning World Champion Cédric Joly competed; both were passed over in selection for the French team in favor of Martin Thomas.

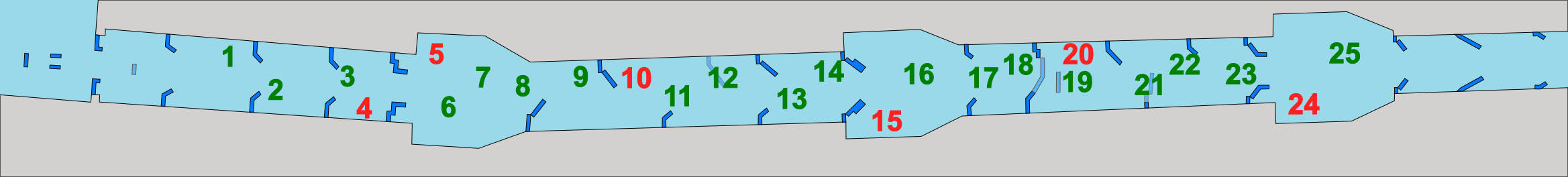
Slalom gate positions for Heats, Tokyo Olympics, 25 July 2021

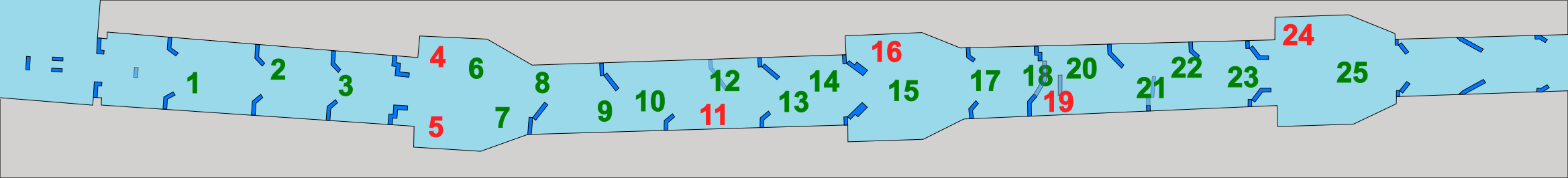
Slalom gate positions for Semifinals and Finals, Tokyo Olympics, 26 July 2021

== Qualification ==
A National Olympic Committee (NOC) entered only 1 qualified canoeist in the men's slalom C-1 event. A total of 17 qualification places were available, allocated as follows:

- 1 place for the host nation, Japan
- 11 places awarded through the 2019 ICF Canoe Slalom World Championships
- 5 places awarded through continental tournaments, 1 per continent

Pavel Eigel also competed, having already earned a quota in the Men's K1 event.

Qualifying places were awarded to the NOC, not to the individual canoeist who earned the place.

The World Championships quota places were allocated as follows:

Rank	Canoeist	Nation	Qualification	Selected competitor
1	Cédric Joly	France	1st placed NOC	Martin Thomas
2	Ander Elosegi	Spain	2nd placed NOC	Ander Elosegi
3	Luka Božič	Slovenia	3rd placed NOC	Benjamin Savšek
4	Alexander Slafkovský	Slovakia	4th placed NOC	Matej Beňuš
6	David Florence	Great Britain	5th placed NOC	Adam Burgess
7	Thomas Koechlin	Switzerland	6th placed NOC	Thomas Koechlin
9	Cameron Smedley	Canada	7th placed NOC	Cameron Smedley
10	Grzegorz Hedwig	Poland	8th placed NOC	Grzegorz Hedwig
11	Robert Hendrick	Ireland	9th placed NOC	Liam Jegou
12	Matija Marinić	Croatia	10th placed NOC	Matija Marinić
13	Vojtěch Heger	Czech Republic	11th placed NOC	Lukáš Rohan
34	Pavel Eigel	ROC	Earned quota in K1	Pavel Eigel

Continental and other places:

Nation	Canoeist	Qualification	Selected competitor
Japan	-	Host nation	Takuya Haneda
Australia	Daniel Watkins	Oceania quota	Daniel Watkins
Germany	Sideris Tasiadis	Europe quota	Sideris Tasiadis
Kazakhstan	Alexandr Kulikov	Asia quota	Alexandr Kulikov
Senegal	Jean-Pierre Bourhis	Africa quota	Jean-Pierre Bourhis
United States	Casey Eichfeld	Americas quota^{[a]}	Zachary Lokken

Notes
^{a} The quota for the Americas was allocated to the NOC with the highest-ranked eligible athlete, due to the cancellation of the 2021 Pan American Championships.

== Competition format ==
Slalom canoeing uses a three-round format, with heats, semifinal, and final. In the heats, each canoeist has two runs at the course with the better time counting. The top 15 advance to the semifinal. In the semifinal, the canoeists get a single run; the top 10 advance to the final. The best time in the single-run final wins gold.

The canoe course is approximately 250 metres long, with up to 25 gates that the canoeist must pass in the correct direction. Penalty time is added for infractions such as passing on the wrong side or touching a gate. Runs typically last approximately 95 seconds.

== Schedule ==
All times are Japan Standard Time (UTC+9)

The men's slalom C-1 took place over two consecutive days.

Date	Time	Round
Sunday, 25 July 2021	13:00	Heats
Monday, 26 July 2021	14:00	Semifinal; Final

== Results ==
Rank	Bib	Canoeist	Nation	Preliminary Heats						Semifinal			Final		
Rank	Bib	Canoeist	Nation	1st Ride	Pen.	2nd Ride	Pen.	Best	Order	Time	Pen.	Order	Time	Pen.	Order
1st place, gold medalist(s)	3	Benjamin Savšek	Slovenia	98.82	2	105.87	4	98.82	2	104.26	2	5	98.25	0	1
2nd place, silver medalist(s)	8	Lukáš Rohan	Czech Republic	103.98	2	102.15	2	102.15	8	103.68	2	4	101.96	2	2
3rd place, bronze medalist(s)	1	Sideris Tasiadis	Germany	100.69	0	101.23	0	100.69	6	105.35	2	6	103.70	0	3
4	4	Adam Burgess	Great Britain	99.82	0	99.64	2	99.64	3	106.18	2	8	103.86	0	4
5	5	Martin Thomas	France	102.75	2	102.83	4	102.75	9	100.65	0	1	104.98	0	5
6	2	Matej Beňuš	Slovakia	99.61	0	96.89	0	96.89	1	106.40	2	9	105.60	2	6
7	14	Zachary Lokken	United States	99.74	0	166.94	6	99.74	4	105.97	2	7	106.08	2	7
8	7	Ander Elosegi	Spain	103.78	4	101.51	0	101.51	7	103.15	2	3	106.59	2	8
9	12	Daniel Watkins	Australia	158.43	54	103.07	2	103.07	10	101.28	0	2	108.18	2	9
10	13	Takuya Haneda	Japan	106.57	0	105.15	2	105.15	13	107.82	0	10	109.30	4	10
11	10	Matija Marinić	Croatia	100.33	0	101.66	2	100.33	5	109.94	2	11	did not advance		
12	17	Alexandr Kulikov	Kazakhstan	109.95	2	107.43	2	107.43	15	110.23	2	12	did not advance		
13	9	Thomas Koechlin	Switzerland	105.66	4	104.57	0	104.57	12	111.20	6	13	did not advance		
14	6	Grzegorz Hedwig	Poland	109.09	6	105.95	4	105.95	14	112.16	4	14	did not advance		
15	11	Liam Jegou	Ireland	174.57	50	104.40	2	104.40	11	208.39	100	15	did not advance		
16	15	Cameron Smedley	Canada	161.07	54	108.12	4	108.12	16	did not advance					
17	16	Jean-Pierre Bourhis	Senegal	111.16	2	110.93	0	110.93	17	did not advance					
18	18	Pavel Eigel	ROC	119.60	4	DNS		119.60	18	did not advance					
