= Liam Jegou =

Irish slalom canoeist (born 1996)

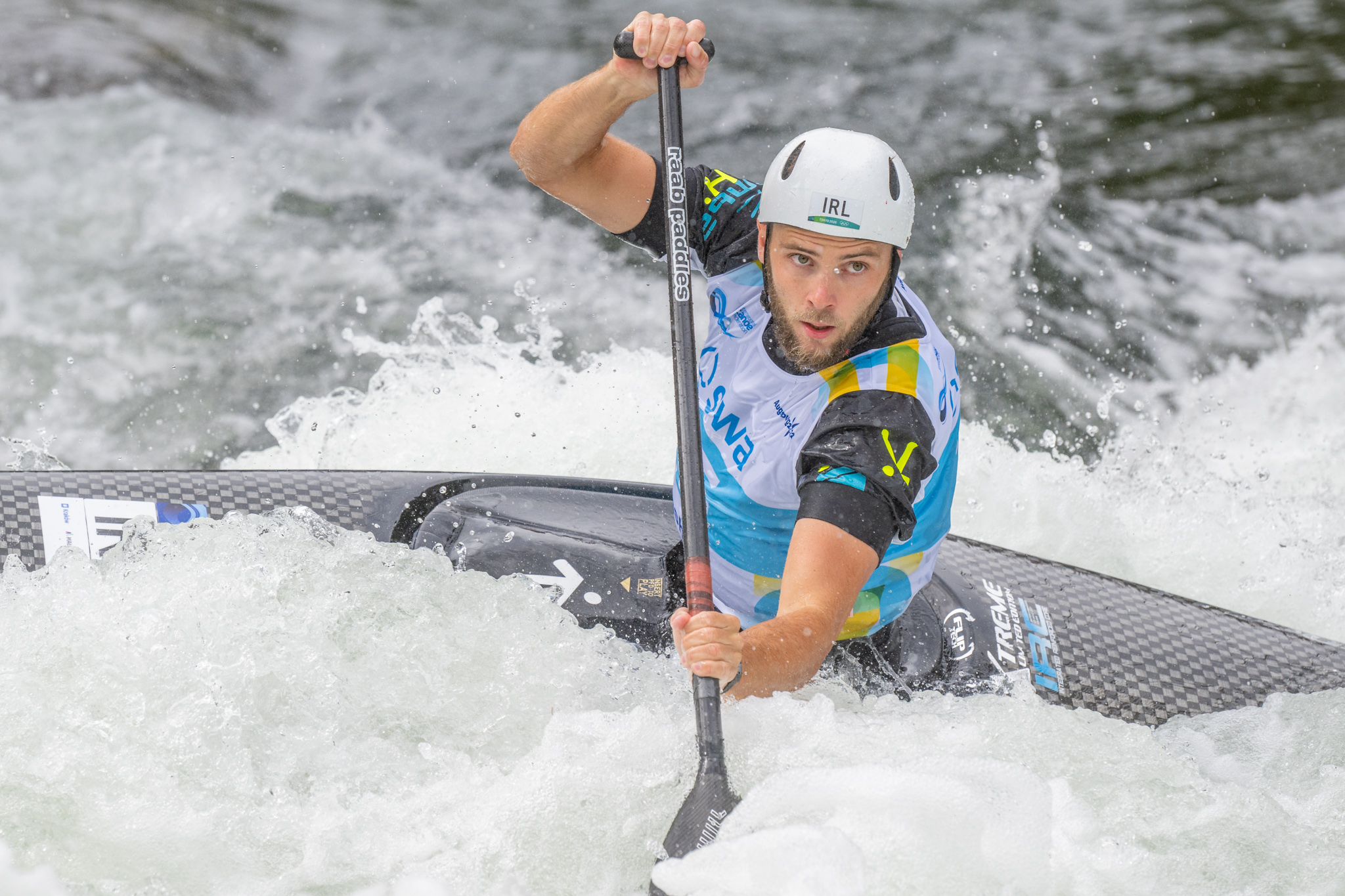
- Liam Jegou performing at 2022 ICF Canoe Slalom World Championships in Augsburg, Germany

Personal information
- Nationality: Irish
- Born: 9 January 1996 (age 30) Pabu, Brittany, France

Sport
- Country: Ireland
- Sport: Canoe slalom
- Events: C1 & C2
- Club: CADPA Huningue.
Medal record
Men's canoe slalom
Representing Ireland
European Championships
Silver medal – second place	2020 Prague	C1 team
U23 World Championships
Bronze medal – third place	2019 Kraków	C1
Junior World Championships
Silver medal – second place	2014 Penrith	C1

Liam Jegou (/ˈʒɛɡuː/; born 9 January 1996) is an Irish slalom canoeist who has competed at the international level since 2011. He is based in France but competes for Ireland. He competes in C1 individually and also competed in C2 with Cade Ryan from 2012 to 2014.

Jegou was born in Pabu, Brittany to an Irish mother and a Breton father. For the first two years of his life, he grew up in Switzerland, before moving to Ballyvaughan, County Clare for the next five years. At the age of seven, his family relocated to Huningue, France.

He won a silver medal in the C1 team event at the 2020 European Championships in Prague. He has also won two medals at the ICF World Junior and U23 Canoe Slalom Championships, with one silver in the junior category (C1: 2014) and one bronze in the U23 category (C1: 2019). He earned his best senior world championship result, of 24th, at the 2018 ICF Canoe Slalom World Championships in Rio de Janeiro.

Jegou represented Ireland in the C1 event at the 2020 Summer Olympics in Tokyo, after Ireland successfully secured a quota place at the 2019 ICF Canoe Slalom World Championships. This marked the first time Ireland was represented in this event since 1996. Liam qualified 11th fastest for the semi-final, and finished in 15th place after incurring 100-seconds of penalties. He also competed at the 2024 Summer Olympics in Paris, finishing 7th in the C1 event and 22nd in kayak cross.

== World Cup individual podiums ==
Season	Date	Venue	Position	Event
2020	8 November 2020	Pau	1st	C1
