= Joris Otten =

Dutch canoeist

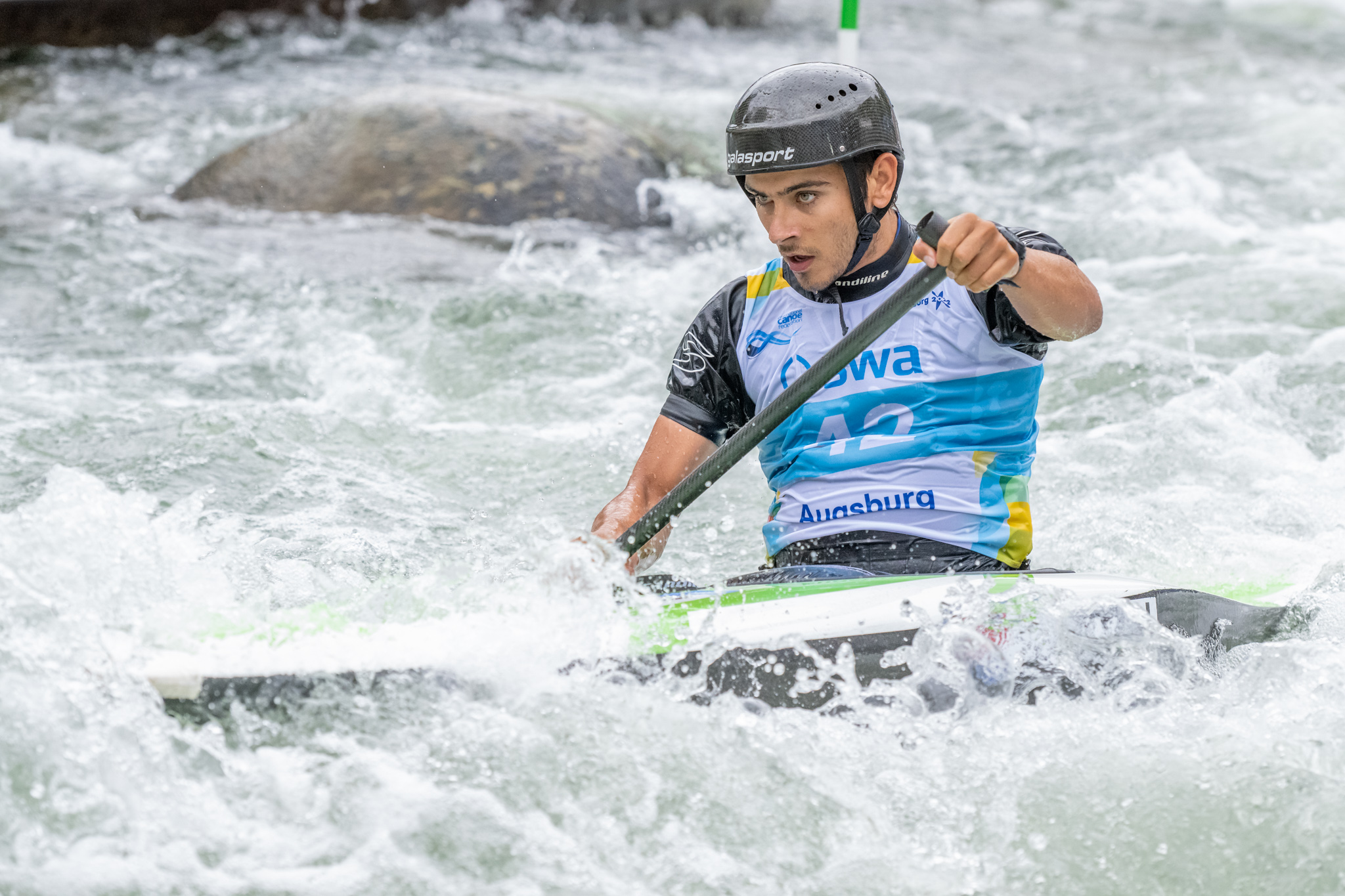
- Otten in 2022

Personal information
- Born: 1 December 1997 (age 28) Helmond, Netherlands

Sport
- Sport: Canoe slalom
- Event: C1, Kayak cross
- Club: HWC de Helmvaarders

Joris Otten (born 1 December 1997) is a Dutch slalom canoeist who has competed at the international level since 2014, specializing in C1 and kayak cross.

He competed at the 2024 Summer Olympics in Paris finishing 17th in the C1 event and 35th in kayak cross.
