= José Carvalho (canoeist) =

Portuguese slalom canoeist

Jose Carvalho
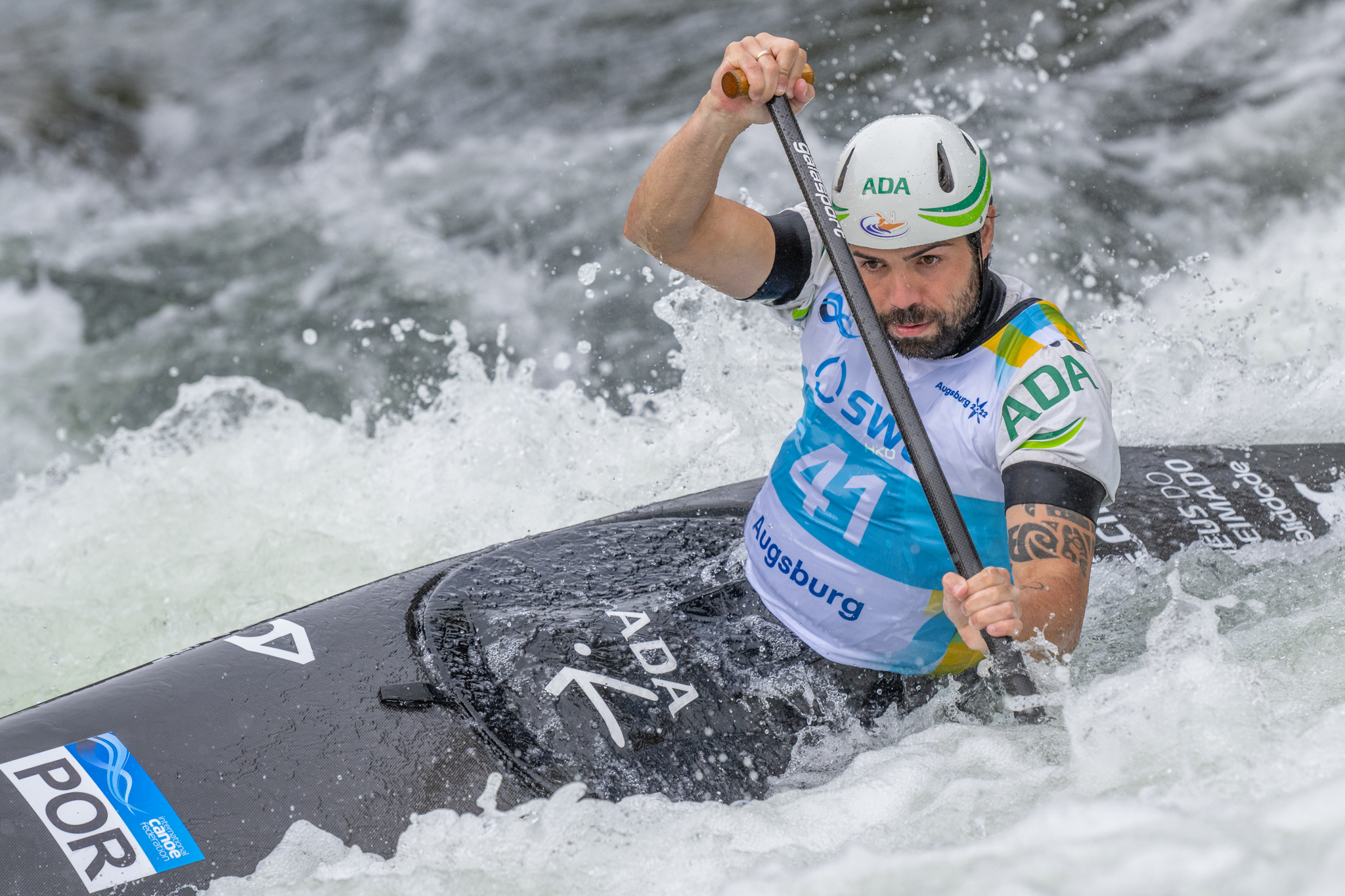
- José Carvalho performing at 2022 ICF Canoe Slalom World Championships in Augsburg, Germany

Personal information
- Nationality: Portuguese
- Born: 18 August 1988 (age 37)
- Height: 1.75 m (5 ft 9 in)
- Weight: 77 kg (170 lb)

Sport
- Country: Portugal
- Sport: Canoeing

Jose Carvalho (born 18 August 1988) is a Portuguese slalom canoeist who has competed since 2004. He finished 9th in the C1 event at the 2016 Summer Olympics in Rio de Janeiro.
