= Grzegorz Hedwig =

Polish slalom canoeist (born 1988)

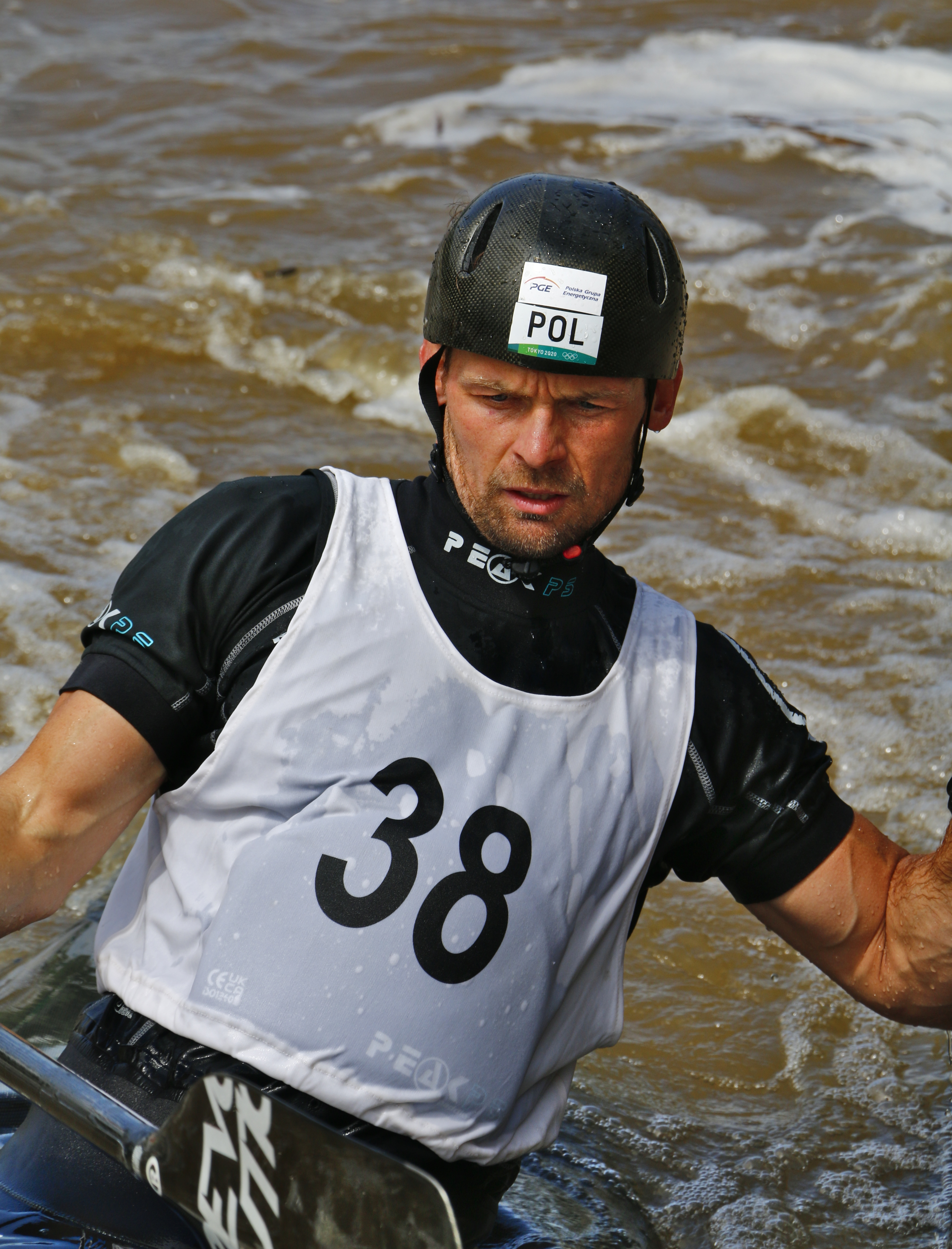
- Hedwig in 2024

Personal information
- Nationality: Polish
- Born: 17 July 1988 (age 38) Nowy Sącz, Poland
- Height: 1.79 m (5 ft 10 in)
- Weight: 82 kg (181 lb)

Sport
- Country: Poland
- Sport: Canoe slalom
- Event: C1
Medal record
Men's canoe slalom
Representing Poland
European Championships
Silver medal – second place	2016 Liptovský Mikuláš	C1 team
Silver medal – second place	2022 Liptovský Mikuláš	C1 team
Bronze medal – third place	2020 Prague	C1 team
U23 European Championships
Gold medal – first place	2007 Kraków	C1 team
Gold medal – first place	2008 Solkan	C1 team
Junior World Championships
Silver medal – second place	2006 Solkan	C1 team
Junior European Championships
Gold medal – first place	2006 Nottingham	C1
Gold medal – first place	2006 Nottingham	C1 team
Silver medal – second place	2005 Kraków	C1 team

Grzegorz Hedwig (born 17 July 1988) is a Polish slalom canoeist who has competed at the international level since 2003.

Hedwig won three medals in the C1 team event at the European Championships (2 silvers and 1 bronze).

He participated at three Summer Olympic Games. He finished 12th in the C1 event at the 2016 Summer Olympics in Rio de Janeiro and 14th in the C1 event at the 2020 Summer Olympics in Tokyo. He then finished 10th in the C1 event and 16th in kayak cross at the 2024 Summer Olympics in Paris.
