= Jean-Pierre Bourhis =

Senegalese canoeist

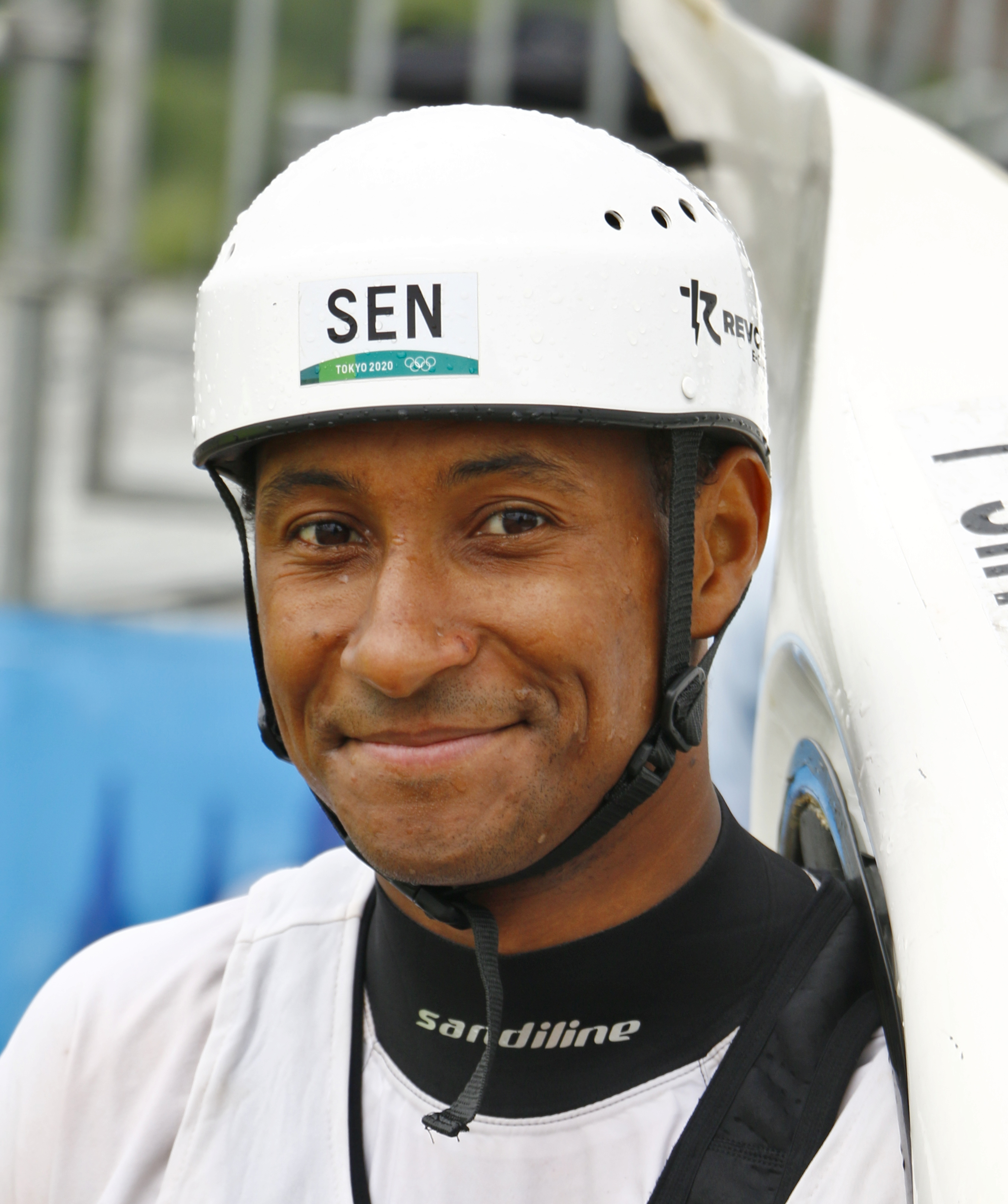

Personal information
- Full name: Jean-Pierre Renan Bourhis
- Nationality: Senegalese-French
- Born: 29 March 1995 (age 30) Quimper, France
- Height: 1.78 m (5 ft 10 in)
- Weight: 73 kg (161 lb)

Sport
- Country: Senegal
- Sport: Canoeing
- Event: C1, K1, Extreme K1

Jean-Pierre Renan Bourhis (born 29 March 1995) is a French-Senegalese slalom canoeist who has competed at the international level since 2012. He finished 18th in the C1 event at the 2016 Summer Olympics in Rio de Janeiro. At the delayed 2020 Summer Olympics in Tokyo, he again competed in the C1 event, improving to 17th. Jean Pierre is currently studying at the Institut national des sciences appliquées in Rennes. (INSA)

His brother is Yves Bourhis, who also represented Senegal in canoeing at the 2024 Summer Olympics.
