= Stjepan Perestegi =

Croatian canoeist

Medal record

Men's canoe slalom

Representing Croatia

World Championships
Silver medal – second place	1995 Nottingham	C-1 team

Stjepan Perestegi (born 20 August 1973) is a Croatian slalom canoeist who competed in the early to mid-1990s. He won a silver medal in the C-1 team event at the 1995 ICF Canoe Slalom World Championships in Nottingham.

Perestegi also finished 23rd in the C-1 event at the 1992 Summer Olympics in Barcelona.
