= Lukáš Rohan =

Czech kayaker (born 1995)

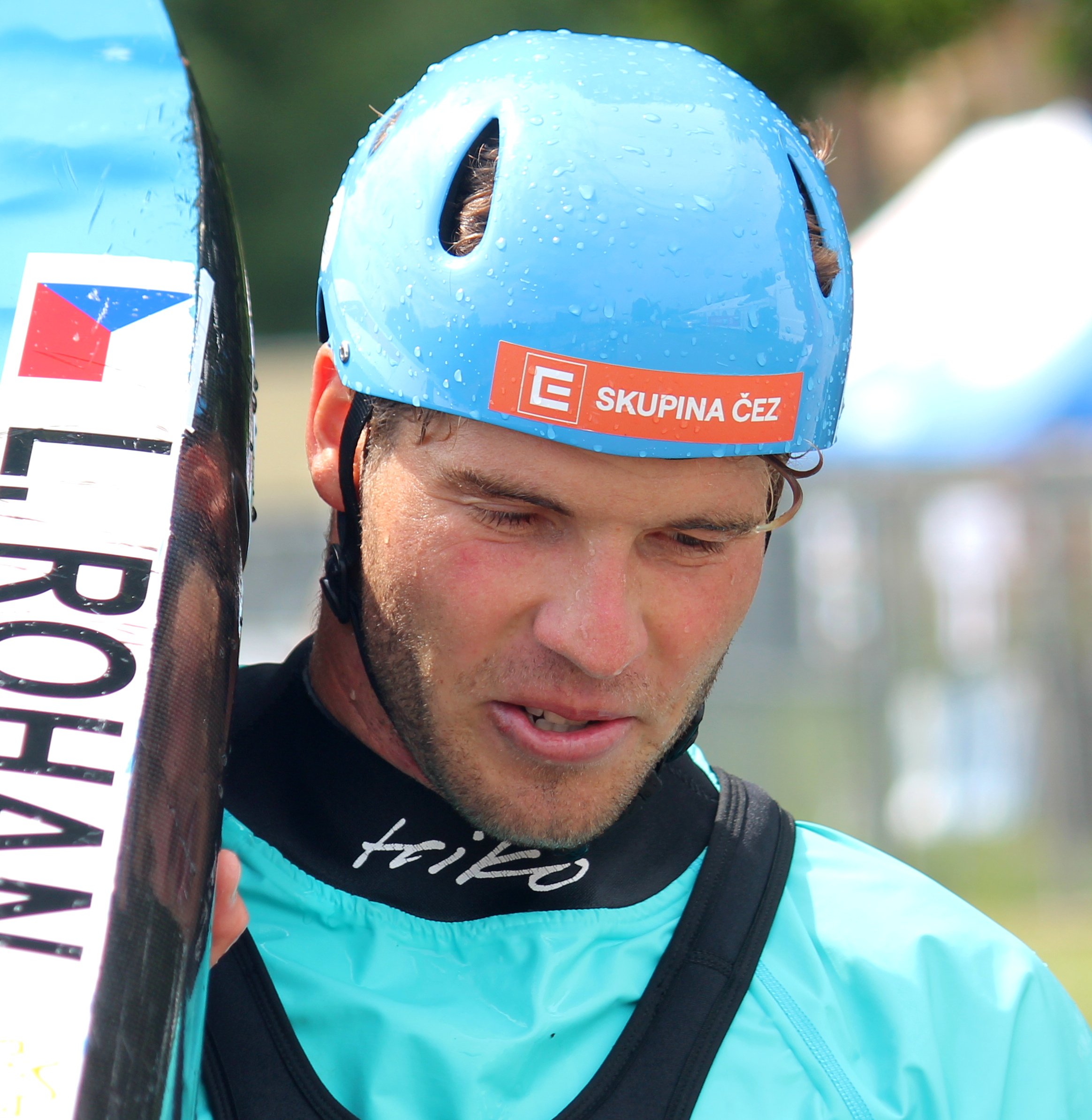
- Rohan in 2023

Personal information
- Nationality: Czech
- Born: 30 May 1995 (age 31) Mělník, Czech Republic

Sport
- Country: Czech Republic
- Sport: Canoe slalom
- Event: C1, C2
- Club: Univerzitní sportovní klub Praha
- Coached by: Jiří Rohan
Medal record
Men's canoe slalom
Representing Czech Republic
Olympic Games
Silver medal – second place	2020 Tokyo	C1
World Championships
Silver medal – second place	2021 Bratislava	C1 team
European Championships
Silver medal – second place	2014 Vienna	C1 team
Silver medal – second place	2020 Prague	C1
Silver medal – second place	2024 Tacen	C1 team
Silver medal – second place	2026 Ivrea	C1 team
Bronze medal – third place	2018 Prague	C1 team
U23 World Championships
Gold medal – first place	2013 Liptovský Mikuláš	C2 team
Gold medal – first place	2017 Bratislava	C1 team
Silver medal – second place	2016 Kraków	C1
Bronze medal – third place	2015 Foz do Iguaçu	C1 team
U23 European Championships
Gold medal – first place	2018 Bratislava	C1 team
Silver medal – second place	2016 Solkan	C1
Bronze medal – third place	2017 Hohenlimburg	C1
Bronze medal – third place	2017 Hohenlimburg	C1 team
Junior World Championships
Silver medal – second place	2012 Wausau	C2
Silver medal – second place	2013 Liptovský Mikuláš	C1
Junior European Championships
Silver medal – second place	2012 Solkan	C1 team
Silver medal – second place	2013 Bourg-Saint-Maurice	C1
Bronze medal – third place	2012 Solkan	C2 team

Lukáš Rohan (Czech pronunciation: [ˈlukaːʃ ˈroɦan]; born 30 May 1995) is a Czech slalom canoeist who has competed at the international level since 2010. He is from Mělník, Czech Republic but lives and trains in Prague. Lukáš now competes solely in the C1 discipline, however he competed in the C2 discipline alongside Adam Svoboda and Martin Říha at different times between 2010 and 2015. He is coached by his father, Olympic silver medallist Jiří Rohan.

Rohan won a silver medal in the C1 event at the 2020 Summer Olympics in Tokyo. He also competed at the 2024 Summer Olympics, finishing 6th in the C1 event and 4th in kayak cross.

He also won a silver medal in the C1 team event at the 2021 World Championships in Bratislava.

He won five medals (4 silvers and 1 bronze) at the European Championships, including a silver medal in the C1 event at the 2020 European Championships in Prague. He also won a myriad of medals at the U23 and Junior levels in both C1 and C2.

== Results ==
=== World Cup individual podiums ===
Season	Date	Venue	Position	Event
2021	13 June 2021	Prague	1st	C1
2022	12 June 2022	Prague	3rd	C1

=== Complete World Cup results ===
Year	Class	WC1	WC2	WC3	WC4	WC5	Points	Position
2012	C2	Cardiff (United Kingdom)	Pau (France)	La Seu (Spain)	Prague (Czech Republic)	Bratislava (Slovakia); 16	13	33rd
2013	C2	Cardiff (United Kingdom); 11	Augsburg (Germany)	La Seu (Spain)	Tacen (Slovenia)	Bratislava (Slovakia)	23	29th
2014	C1	Lee Valley (United Kingdom); 34	Tacen (Slovenia); 24	Prague (Czech Republic); 23	La Seu (Spain)	Augsburg (Germany)	38	38th
2015	C1	Prague (Czech Republic)	Kraków (Poland); 55	Liptovský Mikuláš (Slovakia); 23	La Seu (Spain)	Pau (France)	27	53rd
2016	C1	Ivrea (Italy); 14	La Seu (Spain); 11	Pau (France); 29	Prague (Czech Republic); 6	Tacen (Slovenia); 18	166	10th
2017	C1	Prague (Czech Republic)	Augsburg (Germany)	Markkleeberg (Germany); 8	Ivrea (Italy); 7	La Seu (Spain); 6	166	10th
2018	C1	Liptovský Mikuláš (Slovakia); 10	Kraków (Poland); 15	Augsburg (Germany); 10	Tacen (Slovenia); 22	La Seu (Spain); 17	169	12th
2019	C1	Lee Valley (United Kingdom); 19	Bratislava (Slovakia); 14	Tacen (Slovenia); 13	Markkleeberg (Germany); 24	Prague (Czech Republic); 52	104	22nd
2020	C1	Tacen (Slovenia); 10	Pau (France); 10				N/A^{[a]}	
2021	C1	Prague (Czech Republic); 1	Markkleeberg (Germany)	La Seu (Spain)	Pau (France); 12		122	15th

Notes
^{a} No overall rankings were determined by the ICF, with only two races possible due to the COVID-19 pandemic.
