= 2023 ICF Canoe Slalom World Championships – Men's C1 =

Men's canoe at the 2023 ICF Canoe Slalom World Championships
- Venue: Lee Valley White Water Centre
- Location: London, United Kingdom
- Dates: 20–22 September 2023
- Competitors: 74 from 35 nations

Medalists
gold medal	Benjamin Savšek	Slovenia
silver medal	Nicolas Gestin	France
bronze medal	Paolo Ceccon	Italy

The men's canoe event at the 2023 ICF Canoe Slalom World Championships took place on 22 September 2023 at the Lee Valley White Water Centre in London, with the qualification heats on 20 September 2023.

== Competition format ==
The event uses a three-round format with qualification heats, semifinal and final. Paddlers complete up to two runs in the heats, with the top ranked athletes starting last. In the first heat, the 20 fastest paddlers qualify automatically for the semifinal, whilst the rest compete in the second heat for additional 10 qualification spots. The final rank of non-qualifying athletes is determined by their second run score. Paddlers start in the reverse order of their heats position in the semifinal and complete a single run, with the top 10 advancing to the final. The start list for the final is once again in reverse order of the semifinal results. The athlete with the best time in the single-run final is awarded gold.

A penalty of 2 seconds is awarded for touching a gate and a 50-second penalty is awarded for missing a gate or negotiating it in the opposite direction.

The heats setup had 23 gates including 6 upstream gates (3-11-12-15-19-23). The semifinal and final gate setup also had 23 gates with 6 upstream gates (3-11-12-15-19-23), but in a more difficult configuration, causing slower times.

== Schedule ==
All times listed are UTC+1.

Date	Time	Round
20 September 2023
20 September 2023	11:30	Heats Run 1
20 September 2023	14:39	Heats Run 2
22 September 2023
22 September 2023	11:07	Semifinal
22 September 2023	14:12	Final

== Results ==
Benjamin Savšek won his second individual world title in the C1 event and fifth medal. He recorded a clean run in the final. Nicolas Gestin and Paolo Ceccon earned their first individual medals at the World Championships, winning silver and bronze respectively. Ceccon became the first Italian to win a medal in the C1 event.

There were 12 quota spots available for the 2024 Summer Olympics, one per country. The quota spots were secured by:

- Slovenia
- France
- Italy
- Czech Republic
- Great Britain
- Slovakia
- Germany
- Poland
- Ireland
- Croatia
- United States
- Spain

Penalties are included in the time shown. The fastest time in each round is shown in bold.

Rank	Bib	Athlete	Country	Heats						Semifinal			Final		
Rank	Bib	Athlete	Country	Run 1			Run 2			Semifinal			Final		
Rank	Bib	Athlete	Country	Time	Pen	Rank	Time	Pen	Rank	Time	Pen	Rank	Time	Pen	Rank
1st place, gold medalist(s)	1	Benjamin Savšek	Slovenia	85.97	0	7	-			**98.09**	2	1	**97.40**	0	1
2nd place, silver medalist(s)	5	Nicolas Gestin	France	85.31	0	3	-			100.57	0	8	98.58	0	2
3rd place, bronze medalist(s)	16	Paolo Ceccon	Italy	90.23	2	27	87.63	0	8	101.22	2	10	98.90	0	3
4	14	Lukáš Rohan	Czech Republic	89.14	0	24	86.78	0	5	100.01	0	4	98.93	0	4
5	11	Adam Burgess	Great Britain	85.59	0	4	-			100.18	0	6	99.80	0	5
6	8	Václav Chaloupka	Czech Republic	89.12	2	23	86.14	0	2	100.51	0	7	100.48	0	6
7	7	Matej Beňuš	Slovakia	87.72	0	15	-			100.02	0	5	100.98	0	7
8	3	Sideris Tasiadis	Germany	88.00	2	16	-			99.43	0	3	104.52	4	8
9	26	Grzegorz Hedwig	Poland	87.71	2	14	-			98.48	2	2	110.33	4	9
10	2	Luka Božič	Slovenia	88.23	2	17	-			100.89	2	9	149.61	52	10
11	10	Ryan Westley	Great Britain	87.05	0	10	-			101.29	2	11	did not advance		
12	4	Alexander Slafkovský	Slovakia	86.72	0	9	-			101.62	2	12	did not advance		
13	20	Jules Bernardet	France	85.83	0	5	-			102.35	4	13	did not advance		
14	13	Marko Mirgorodský	Slovakia	86.03	0	8	-			103.03	0	14	did not advance		
15	9	Franz Anton	Germany	87.62	0	13	-			103.16	0	15	did not advance		
16	29	Robert Hendrick	Ireland	85.86	2	6	-			103.51	0	16	did not advance		
17	27	Matija Marinić	Croatia	92.17	4	37	87.92	0	9	104.69	4	17	did not advance		
18	21	Timo Trummer	Germany	94.34	6	41	88.16	0	10	105.78	4	18	did not advance		
19	38	Casey Eichfeld	United States	89.74	2	26	87.60	2	7	105.89	4	19	did not advance		
20	15	Thomas Koechlin	Switzerland	88.69	0	20	-			106.13	2	20	did not advance		
20	25	Luis Fernández	Spain	88.63	2	18	-			106.13	4	20	did not advance		
22	18	Kacper Sztuba	Poland	91.11	2	31	86.61	0	3	107.27	6	22	did not advance		
23	32	Takuya Haneda	Japan	89.02	0	22	**86.07**	0	1	108.61	2	23	did not advance		
24	12	Raffaello Ivaldi	Italy	84.40	0	2	-			109.32	4	24	did not advance		
25	6	Miquel Travé	Spain	**84.07**	2	1	-			109.68	2	25	did not advance		
26	67	Zhang Peng	China	88.92	0	21	87.35	0	6	112.26	6	26	did not advance		
27	23	Zachary Lokken	United States	87.52	0	11	-			119.13	0	27	did not advance		
28	22	Žiga Lin Hočevar	Slovenia	88.68	0	19	-			159.83	52	28	did not advance		
29	66	Charles Corrêa	Brazil	201.36	104	71	86.77	0	4	166.32	54	29	did not advance		
30	17	Liam Jegou	Ireland	87.53	2	12	-			253.48	152	30	did not advance		
31	24	Jiří Prskavec	Czech Republic	90.33	0	28	88.47	2	11	did not advance					
32	35	Daniel Pérez	Spain	91.35	2	32	88.76	2	12	did not advance					
33	43	Kauã da Silva	Brazil	91.69	0	34	89.07	0	13	did not advance					
34	36	James Kettle	Great Britain	96.56	4	49	89.12	2	14	did not advance					
35	31	Jake Cochrane	Ireland	139.90	52	66	89.35	0	15	did not advance					
36	74	Anvar Klevleev	Uzbekistan	91.62	4	33	89.97	2	16	did not advance					
37	49	Shota Sasaki	Japan	92.04	2	36	90.18	0	17	did not advance					
38	30	Tristan Carter	Australia	90.38	0	29	90.29	2	18	did not advance					
39	39	Joris Otten	Netherlands	94.61	2	42	90.30	0	19	did not advance					
40	34	Brodie Crawford	Australia	97.45	4	51	90.46	0	20	did not advance					
41	50	Christos Tsakmakis	Greece	95.76	0	47	90.77	0	21	did not advance					
42	19	Roberto Colazingari	Italy	90.58	0	30	90.80	2	22	did not advance					
43	51	José Carvalho	Portugal	97.95	4	52	91.11	0	23	did not advance					
44	46	Oliver Puchner	New Zealand	150.32	54	69	91.38	0	24	did not advance					
45	44	Xie Yuancong	China	145.53	54	68	91.42	0	25	did not advance					
46	42	Alexandr Kulikov	Kazakhstan	92.02	2	35	91.90	2	26	did not advance					
47	68	Chen Zhihao	China	95.09	0	44	91.95	0	27	did not advance					
48	40	Alex Baldoni	Canada	98.98	4	53	92.21	2	28	did not advance					
49	37	Kaylen Bassett	Australia	95.45	2	46	92.26	2	29	did not advance					
50	60	Abubakir Bukanov	Uzbekistan	94.99	2	43	92.56	2	30	did not advance					
51	53	Kuanysh Yerengaipov	Kazakhstan	93.70	4	38	92.86	0	31	did not advance					
52	45	Michał Wiercioch	Poland	144.10	52	67	93.13	2	32	did not advance					
53	41	Sebastián Rossi	Argentina	94.12	0	40	93.65	2	33	did not advance					
54	33	Jean-Pierre Bourhis	Senegal	94.05	2	39	93.78	0	34	did not advance					
55	54	Manuel Trípano	Argentina	101.96	2	55	94.51	0	35	did not advance					
56	57	Sören Loos	Netherlands	96.72	2	50	95.29	2	36	did not advance					
57	48	Nathaniel Francis	United States	DNF		74	95.93	0	37	did not advance					
58	52	Terence Saramandif	Mauritius	96.04	4	48	95.99	4	38	did not advance					
59	47	Roko Bengeri	Croatia	102.92	10	57	96.91	6	39	did not advance					
60	69	Liu Chin-han	Chinese Taipei	95.44	2	45	96.94	2	40	did not advance					
61	72	Leonardo Curcel	Paraguay	107.31	4	60	98.23	0	41	did not advance					
62	58	Daniel Parry	Canada	104.95	4	59	98.53	6	42	did not advance					
63	56	Shota Saito	Japan	99.33	2	54	98.96	0	43	did not advance					
64	55	Alibek Temirgaliev	Uzbekistan	108.17	2	61	99.56	4	44	did not advance					
65	59	Yutthakan Chaidet	Thailand	104.83	6	58	102.62	0	45	did not advance					
66	61	Nicolás Trípano	Argentina	102.55	2	56	104.51	4	46	did not advance					
67	70	Ioannis Zachos	Greece	123.85	4	64	107.28	2	47	did not advance					
68	62	Muhammet Usta	Turkey	109.12	8	62	108.69	0	48	did not advance					
69	65	Richard Merjan	Lebanon	166.57	56	70	122.15	6	49	did not advance					
70	28	Lucas Roisin	France	89.19	2	25	137.51	52	50	did not advance					
71	64	Emir Fazıl Yazıcı	Turkey	112.83	8	63	168.69	56	51	did not advance					
72	73	Amir Rezanejad Hassanjani	ICF	286.91	158	73	191.17	56	52	did not advance					
73	71	Rimantas Pumputis	Lithuania	229.45	110	72	196.23	58	53	did not advance					
74	63	Ricardo Fentanes	Mexico	124.65	14	65	246.71	106	54	did not advance					
