= Canoe slalom at the 2023 European Games – Men's C1 =

Men's canoe at the 2023 European Games
- Venue: Kraków-Kolna Canoe Slalom Course
- Date: 30 June – 2 July
- Competitors: 44 from 19 nations

Medalists
gold medal	Ryan Westley	Great Britain
silver medal	Miquel Travé	Spain
bronze medal	Václav Chaloupka	Czech Republic

The canoe slalom men's canoe event at the 2023 European Games took place on 2 July 2023 at the Kraków-Kolna Canoe Slalom Course in Kraków, with the qualification heats on 30 June 2023.

== Competition format ==
The event uses a three-round format with qualification heats, semifinal and final. Paddlers complete up to two runs in the heats, with the top ranked athletes starting last. In the first heat, the 20 fastest paddlers qualify automatically for the semifinal, whilst the rest compete in the second heat for additional 10 qualification spots. The final rank of non-qualifying athletes is determined by their second run score. Paddlers start in the reverse order of their heats position in the semifinal and complete a single run, with the top 10 advancing to the final. The start list for the final is once again in reverse order of the semifinal results. The athlete with the best time in the single-run final is awarded gold.

A penalty of 2 seconds is awarded for touching a gate and a 50-second penalty is awarded for missing a gate or negotiating it in the opposite direction.

An easier gate setup is generally used for the heats and then a more difficult one for semifinal and final.

== Schedule ==
All times are Central European Summer Time (UTC+2)

Date	Time	Round
30 June 2023
30 June 2023	09:35	Heats Run 1
30 June 2023	11:05	Heats Run 2
2 July 2023
2 July 2023	09:04	Semifinal
2 July 2023	11:40	Final

== Results ==
Penalties are included in the time shown. The fastest time in each round is shown in bold.

Rank	Bib	Athlete	Country	Heats						Semifinal			Final		
Rank	Bib	Athlete	Country	Run 1			Run 2			Semifinal			Final		
Rank	Bib	Athlete	Country	Time	Pen	Rank	Time	Pen	Rank	Time	Pen	Rank	Time	Pen	Rank
1st place, gold medalist(s)	15	Ryan Westley	Great Britain	91.77	0	5	—			99.21	0	6	**94.01**	0	1
2nd place, silver medalist(s)	6	Miquel Travé	Spain	95.47	2	17	—			98.65	2	5	95.16	0	2
3rd place, bronze medalist(s)	9	Václav Chaloupka	Czech Republic	93.43	0	9	—			96.94	2	3	96.10	0	3
4	29	Jiří Prskavec	Czech Republic	94.31	0	14	—			99.36	2	7	96.18	0	4
5	24	Timo Trummer	Germany	96.06	2	20	—			99.75	0	9	98.57	0	5
6	1	Benjamin Savšek	Slovenia	92.99	2	8	—			**95.52**	0	1	98.73	4	6
7	10	Adam Burgess	Great Britain	91.97	0	6	—			95.89	0	2	101.36	2	7
8	8	Franz Anton	Germany	**90.93**	0	1	—			99.98	2	10	109.59	2	8
9	25	Lucas Roisin	France	91.48	0	2	—			98.29	2	4	113.93	6	9
10	17	Kacper Sztuba	Poland	92.06	0	7	—			99.68	0	8	156.75	50	10
11	18	Jules Bernardet	France	143.76	54	40	**91.86**	2	1	100.14	2	11	Did not advance		
12	7	Matej Beňuš	Slovakia	97.69	4	26	93.99	0	3	100.77	0	12	Did not advance		
13	13	Lukáš Rohan	Czech Republic	145.49	50	41	95.92	2	7	100.80	0	13	Did not advance		
14	11	Raffaello Ivaldi	Italy	93.55	0	10	—			101.10	0	14	Did not advance		
15	5	Nicolas Gestin	France	97.33	4	24	94.21	0	4	101.30	4	15	Did not advance		
16	4	Sideris Tasiadis	Germany	91.75	0	4	—			101.67	2	16	Did not advance		
17	2	Luka Božič	Slovenia	91.74	0	3	—			102.19	6	17	Did not advance		
18	12	Marko Mirgorodský	Slovakia	94.34	2	15	—			103.88	2	18	Did not advance		
19	34	Michał Wiercioch	Poland	95.75	0	19	—			103.90	2	19	Did not advance		
20	3	Alexander Slafkovský	Slovakia	93.66	0	12	—			104.89	4	20	Did not advance		
21	30	Nejc Polenčič	Slovenia	95.68	0	18	—			105.85	4	21	Did not advance		
22	32	James Kettle	Great Britain	100.23	6	28	95.20	0	6	106.79	4	22	Did not advance		
23	22	Matija Marinić	Croatia	94.13	0	13	—			107.06	4	23	Did not advance		
24	16	Liam Jegou	Ireland	93.56	0	11	—			108.25	4	24	Did not advance		
25	19	Flavio Micozzi	Italy	96.37	0	22	92.69	0	2	108.47	8	25	Did not advance		
26	31	Daniel Pérez	Spain	96.79	2	23	96.46	0	9	111.34	0	26	Did not advance		
27	20	Paolo Ceccon	Italy	100.74	4	29	94.90	0	5	122.14	10	27	Did not advance		
28	23	Grzegorz Hedwig	Poland	96.24	2	21	96.16	0	8	151.68	54	28	Did not advance		
29	33	Joris Otten	Netherlands	94.73	0	16	—			210.25	102	29	Did not advance		
30	27	Jake Cochrane	Ireland	97.34	2	25	98.93	2	10	220.67	108	30	Did not advance		
31	26	Robert Hendrick	Ireland	155.65	58	43	99.64	2	11	Did not advance					
32	35	José Carvalho	Portugal	103.16	4	31	100.41	4	12	Did not advance					
33	21	Luis Fernández	Spain	109.58	6	33	106.26	8	13	Did not advance					
34	38	Sören Loos	Netherlands	102.11	2	30	106.98	8	14	Did not advance					
35	36	Christos Tsakmakis	Greece	130.37	8	44	108.12	4	15	Did not advance					
36	37	Oleksandr Fedorenko	Ukraine	113.48	4	35	113.96	6	16	Did not advance					
37	39	Muhammet Usta	Turkey	167.69	58	44	114.84	6	17	Did not advance					
38	28	Serhii Sovko	Ukraine	128.87	12	39	117.29	6	18	Did not advance					
39	42	Emīls Varslavāns	Latvia	124.70	6	38	127.22	6	19	Did not advance					
40	43	Maksym Korniichuk	Ukraine	112.01	4	34	127.63	4	20	Did not advance					
41	40	Emir Fazıl Yazıcı	Turkey	119.55	2	37	130.02	6	21	Did not advance					
42	41	Rimantas Pumputis	Lithuania	150.86	16	42	135.92	10	22	Did not advance					
43	44	Ioannis Zachos	Greece	116.86	4	36	146.02	12	23	Did not advance					
44	14	Thomas Koechlin	Switzerland	97.96	2	27	158.05	56	24	Did not advance					
