= 2022 ICF Canoe Slalom World Championships – Men's C1 team =

Men's canoe teams at the 2022 ICF Canoe Slalom World Championships
- Venue: Augsburg Eiskanal
- Location: Augsburg, Germany
- Dates: 27 July 2022
- Competitors: 45 from 15 nations
- Teams: 15

Medalists
gold medal	Benjamin Savšek; Luka Božič; Anže Berčič	Slovenia
silver medal	Matej Beňuš; Marko Mirgorodský; Alexander Slafkovský	Slovakia
bronze medal	Roberto Colazingari; Raffaello Ivaldi; Paolo Ceccon	Italy

The men's canoe team event at the 2022 ICF Canoe Slalom World Championships took place on 27 July 2022 at the Augsburg Eiskanal in Augsburg.

== Competition format ==
Team events use a single run format with the team with the fastest time including penalties awarded gold. Teams consist of three paddlers from the same country.

Penalties are accumulated for each athlete, such that a team can incur a total of 150 seconds of penalties on a single gate (if all three miss it) or 6 seconds (if all three touch it). The time begins when the first paddler crosses the start beam and ends when the last one crosses the finish beam. All three paddlers must cross the finish line within 15 seconds of each other or else incur an additional 50-second penalty.

Team events are generally contested on the same gate setup as the qualification heats of the individual events.

== Results ==
Rank	Bib	Country	Athletes	Result		
Rank	Bib	Country	Athletes	Time	Pen	Total
1st place, gold medalist(s)	5	Slovenia	Benjamin Savšek; Luka Božič; Anže Berčič	95.48	0	95.48
2nd place, silver medalist(s)	3	Slovakia	Matej Beňuš; Marko Mirgorodský; Alexander Slafkovský	96.42	2	98.42
3rd place, bronze medalist(s)	7	Italy	Roberto Colazingari; Raffaello Ivaldi; Paolo Ceccon	98.64	2	100.64
4	14	Germany	Sideris Tasiadis; Franz Anton; Timo Trummer	96.93	6	102.93
5	11	Ireland	Robert Hendrick; Jake Cochrane; Liam Jegou	101.70	4	105.70
6	2	Czech Republic	Lukáš Rohan; Václav Chaloupka; Vojtěch Heger	99.81	6	105.81
7	15	Japan	Takuya Haneda; Shota Sasaki; Shota Saito	104.88	2	106.88
8	10	Australia	Tristan Carter; Kaylen Bassett; Brodie Crawford	103.35	8	111.35
9	4	Poland	Grzegorz Hedwig; Kacper Sztuba; Michał Wiercioch	101.58	12	113.58
10	12	China	Zhang Zhicheng; Xie Yuancong; Zhang Hang	110.96	18	128.96
11	1	France	Denis Gargaud Chanut; Nicolas Gestin; Mewen Debliquy	95.86	52	147.86
12	8	Spain	Luis Fernández; Miquel Travé; Ander Elosegi	99.22	54	153.22
13	9	Great Britain	Adam Burgess; Ryan Westley; Peter Linksted	105.09	56	161.09
14	6	United States	Zachary Lokken; Nathaniel Francis; Casey Eichfeld	106.68	58	164.68
-	13	India	Vishvjeet Kushwaha; Vishal Kewat; Lucky Verma	DNS		
