= Canoe slalom at the 2023 European Games – Men's C1 team =

Men's canoe team at the 2023 European Games
- Venue: Kraków-Kolna Canoe Slalom Course
- Date: 30 June
- Competitors: 33 from 11 nations
- Teams: 11

Medalists
gold medal	Sideris Tasiadis; Franz Anton; Timo Trummer	Germany
silver medal	Matej Beňuš; Marko Mirgorodský; Alexander Slafkovský	Slovakia
bronze medal	Ryan Westley; Adam Burgess; James Kettle	Great Britain

The canoe slalom men's canoe team event at the 2023 European Games took place on 30 June 2023 at the Kraków-Kolna Canoe Slalom Course in Kraków.

== Competition format ==
Team events use a single run format with the team with the fastest time including penalties awarded gold. Teams consist of three paddlers from the same country.

Penalties are accumulated for each athlete, such that a team can incur a total of 150 seconds of penalties on a single gate (if all three miss it) or 6 seconds (if all three touch it). The time begins when the first paddler crosses the start beam and ends when the last one crosses the finish beam. All three paddlers must cross the finish line within 15 seconds of each other or else incur an additional 50-second penalty.

Team events are generally contested on the same gate setup as the qualification heats of the individual events.

== Results ==
Rank	Bib	Country	Athletes	Result		
Rank	Bib	Country	Athletes	Time	Pen	Total
1st place, gold medalist(s)	1	Germany	Sideris Tasiadis; Franz Anton; Timo Trummer	101.69	0	101.69
2nd place, silver medalist(s)	4	Slovakia	Matej Beňuš; Marko Mirgorodský; Alexander Slafkovský	103.60	2	105.60
3rd place, bronze medalist(s)	8	Great Britain	Ryan Westley; Adam Burgess; James Kettle	103.84	4	107.84
4	5	Italy	Paolo Ceccon; Raffaello Ivaldi; Flavio Micozzi	105.17	4	109.17
5	9	France	Jules Bernardet; Nicolas Gestin; Lucas Roisin	101.26	8	109.26
6	6	Czechia	Václav Chaloupka; Lukáš Rohan; Jiří Prskavec	105.53	6	111.53
7	2	Poland	Kacper Sztuba; Grzegorz Hedwig; Michał Wiercioch	108.03	4	112.03
8	10	Slovenia	Benjamin Savšek; Luka Božič; Nejc Polenčič	103.29	10	113.29
9	3	Spain	Miquel Travé; Luis Fernández; Daniel Pérez	111.09	6	117.09
10	7	Ireland	Liam Jegou; Robert Hendrick; Jake Cochrane	110.24	8	118.24
11	11	Ukraine	Oleksandr Fedorenko; Serhii Sovko; Maksym Korniichuk	142.62	66	208.62
