= 2021 ICF Canoe Slalom World Championships – Men's C1 =

World championship canoeing event

Men's C1 at the 2021 ICF Canoe Slalom World Championships
- Venue: Čunovo Water Sports Centre
- Location: Bratislava, Slovakia
- Dates: 23–26 September 2021
- Competitors: 53 from 27 nations

Medalists
| gold medal | Václav Chaloupka | Czech Republic |
| silver medal | Alexander Slafkovský | Slovakia |
| bronze medal | Franz Anton | Germany |

The Men's C1 at the 2021 ICF Canoe Slalom World Championships took place on 23 and 26 September 2021 at the Čunovo Water Sports Centre in Bratislava. It was the 41st edition of the event, and 53 athletes from 27 nations competed.

The event was won by Václav Chaloupka of the Czech Republic, competing in his first World Championships. Slovak Alexander Slafkovský won silver, matching his position from 2013 and 2017, whilst 2018 World Champion Franz Anton won bronze.

== Background ==
Reigning World Champion Cédric Joly did not have the opportunity to defend his title won in La Seu d'Urgell in 2019, after he missed out on domestic selection. World No. 1 and Tokyo bronze-medallist Sideris Tasiadis also didn't compete. Benjamin Savšek entered the event as Olympic Champion and had the opportunity to become the first male to become World and Olympic Champion in the same calendar year. Frenchman Denis Gargaud Chanut came into the event having won two World Cup rounds en route to his first overall World Cup title. Gargaud Chanut also won the European Championships this year and the 2011 World Championships on this course. Host nation Slovakia also fielded a strong team, with World No. 2 Alexander Slafkovský and No. 4 Matej Beňuš.

== Competition format ==
The Men's C1 event in canoe slalom uses a three-round format with heats, a semifinal and final. Athletes complete up to two runs in the heats. In the first heat, the 20 fastest men qualify automatically for the semifinal, whilst the rest complete another run in the repêchage second heat for a further 10 qualification positions. The final rank of non-qualifying athletes is determined by their second run score. Athletes start in the reverse order of their heats position in the semifinal and complete a single run, with the top 10 advancing to the final. The athlete with the best time in the single-run final is awarded gold.

Penalties of 2 or 50 seconds are incurred for infractions such as missing a gate, touching a gate, or not negotiating gates in numerical order. A team may request up to one review of a penalty per boat in the heats or semifinals phases, with no enquiries considered in the finals.

== Schedule ==
All times are Central European Summer Time (UTC+2)

| Date | Time | Round |
|---|---|---|
Thursday, 23 September 2021
| Thursday, 23 September 2021 | 15:48 | Heats Run 1 |
| Thursday, 23 September 2021 | 17:28 | Heats Run 2 |
Sunday, 26 September 2021
| Sunday, 26 September 2021 | 10:08 | Semifinal |
| Sunday, 26 September 2021 | 12:10 | Final |

== Results ==
Home favourite Alexander Slafkovský topped the first heat with a clean 83.96, more than 2 seconds clear of next best Olympic Champion Benjamin Savšek. Pole Kacper Sztuba won the second heat, 3.03 off Slafkovský's first run time. Martin Thomas and Raffaello Ivaldi were the two highest ranked athletes to miss out on the semifinal. 26 of the 30 who progressed to the semifinal did so with a penalty-free run.

Savšek finished fastest in the semifinal with a time of 91.18, ahead of 2018 World Champion Franz Anton and Slafkovský.

Václav Chaloupka became the 2021 C1M World Champion with a clean run of 92.02, the first to become both Senior and U23 World Champion in this event. Slafkovský won silver, just 0.15 seconds behind Chaloupka due to a touch on the penultimate gate, whilst Anton won bronze. Savšek appeared set to win the event before a mistake at the bottom of the course which incurred him a 50-second penalty.

Penalties are included in the time shown. The fastest time in each round is shown in bold.

| Rank | Bib | Canoeist | Nation | Heats | | | | | | Semifinal | | | Final | | |
| Rank | Bib | Canoeist | Nation | Run 1 | | | Run 2 | | | Semifinal | | | Final | | |
| Rank | Bib | Canoeist | Nation | Time | Pen. | Order | Time | Pen. | Order | Time | Pen. | Order | Time | Pen. | Order |
|---|---|---|---|---|---|---|---|---|---|---|---|---|---|---|---|
| 1st place, gold medalist(s) | 17 | Václav Chaloupka | Czech Republic | 90.86 | 0 | 26 | 91.12 | 2 | 7 | 93.63 | 4 | 6 | **92.02** | 0 | 1 |
| 2nd place, silver medalist(s) | 1 | Alexander Slafkovský | Slovakia | **83.96** | 0 | 1 | - | | | 92.75 | 2 | 3 | 92.17 | 2 | 2 |
| 3rd place, bronze medalist(s) | 2 | Franz Anton | Germany | 88.32 | 0 | 16 | - | | | 91.66 | 0 | 2 | 94.10 | 2 | 3 |
| 4 | 19 | Nicolas Gestin | France | 88.04 | 0 | 12 | - | | | 94.44 | 4 | 7 | 94.81 | 4 | 4 |
| 5 | 7 | Denis Gargaud Chanut | France | 88.21 | 0 | 15 | - | | | 93.11 | 0 | 4 | 94.84 | 4 | 5 |
| 6 | 13 | Ander Elosegi | Spain | 88.37 | 2 | 17 | - | | | 93.56 | 2 | 5 | 95.17 | 2 | 6 |
| 7 | 16 | Lukáš Rohan | Czech Republic | 87.52 | 0 | 9 | - | | | 95.87 | 6 | 10 | 99.15 | 0 | 7 |
| 8 | 8 | Adam Burgess | Great Britain | 89.92 | 2 | 24 | 88.85 | 0 | 3 | 95.60 | 0 | 9 | 105.96 | 2 | 8 |
| 9 | 5 | Benjamin Savšek | Slovenia | 86.30 | 0 | 2 | - | | | **91.18** | 2 | 1 | 141.31 | 50 | 9 |
| 10 | 3 | Matej Beňuš | Slovakia | 88.07 | 0 | 13 | - | | | 95.57 | 2 | 8 | 141.97 | 50 | 10 |
| 11 | 6 | David Florence | Great Britain | 86.57 | 0 | 3 | - | | | 96.58 | 2 | 11 | did not advance | | |
| 12 | 10 | Miquel Travé | Spain | 90.57 | 2 | 25 | 87.49 | 0 | 2 | 97.09 | 6 | 12 | did not advance | | |
| 13 | 26 | Zachary Lokken | USA | 89.58 | 0 | 19 | - | | | 97.19 | 4 | 13 | did not advance | | |
| 14 | 28 | Luis Fernández | Spain | 87.15 | 0 | 7 | - | | | 97.39 | 4 | 14 | did not advance | | |
| 15 | 23 | Kirill Setkin | RCF | 93.02 | 2 | 35 | 88.97 | 0 | 4 | 97.80 | 0 | 15 | did not advance | | |
| 16 | 27 | Flavio Micozzi | Italy | 87.71 | 0 | 10 | - | | | 98.85 | 0 | 16 | did not advance | | |
| 17 | 24 | Matija Marinić | Croatia | 86.91 | 0 | 5 | - | | | 100.08 | 2 | 17 | did not advance | | |
| 18 | 14 | Roberto Colazingari | Italy | 89.34 | 0 | 18 | - | | | 101.19 | 6 | 18 | did not advance | | |
| 19 | 12 | Grzegorz Hedwig | Poland | 88.11 | 0 | 14 | - | | | 101.22 | 4 | 19 | did not advance | | |
| 20 | 34 | Nikolai Shkliaruk | RCF | 93.11 | 2 | 36 | 91.65 | 2 | 9 | 101.41 | 2 | 20 | did not advance | | |
| 21 | 38 | Joris Otten | Netherlands | 92.35 | 0 | 31 | 89.71 | 0 | 5 | 101.76 | 6 | 21 | did not advance | | |
| 22 | 25 | Liam Jegou | Ireland | 91.17 | 2 | 28 | 90.68 | 0 | 6 | 102.35 | 6 | 22 | did not advance | | |
| 23 | 21 | Kacper Sztuba | Poland | 89.60 | 0 | 21 | **86.99** | 0 | 1 | 109.69 | 4 | 23 | did not advance | | |
| 24 | 20 | Thomas Koechlin | Switzerland | 86.98 | 0 | 6 | - | | | 142.40 | 50 | 24 | did not advance | | |
| 25 | 22 | Vojtěch Heger | Czech Republic | 87.98 | 0 | 11 | - | | | 142.43 | 50 | 25 | did not advance | | |
| 26 | 18 | Casey Eichfeld | USA | 89.59 | 2 | 20 | - | | | 145.56 | 50 | 26 | did not advance | | |
| 27 | 4 | Luka Božič | Slovenia | 86.80 | 0 | 4 | - | | | 148.76 | 56 | 27 | did not advance | | |
| 28 | 30 | Jean-Pierre Bourhis | Senegal | 89.70 | 0 | 22 | 91.69 | 0 | 10 | 149.20 | 52 | 28 | did not advance | | |
| 29 | 36 | Peter Linksted | Great Britain | 91.47 | 0 | 29 | 91.22 | 0 | 8 | 151.42 | 52 | 29 | did not advance | | |
| 30 | 9 | Marko Mirgorodský | Slovakia | 87.50 | 0 | 8 | - | | | 256.22 | 156 | 30 | did not advance | | |
| 31 | 32 | Dmitrii Khramtsov | RCF | 92.37 | 2 | 32 | 91.74 | 2 | 11 | did not advance | | | | | |
| 32 | 31 | Jake Cochrane | Ireland | 146.87 | 54 | 46 | 92.68 | 2 | 12 | did not advance | | | | | |
| 33 | 29 | Timo Trummer | Germany | 92.83 | 0 | 33 | 94.91 | 2 | 13 | did not advance | | | | | |
| 34 | 33 | Felipe Borges | Brazil | 95.28 | 0 | 38 | 95.59 | 2 | 14 | did not advance | | | | | |
| 35 | 42 | Nathaniel Francis | USA | 100.05 | 2 | 39 | 95.84 | 2 | 15 | did not advance | | | | | |
| 36 | 35 | Klemen Vidmar | Slovenia | 145.83 | 50 | 45 | 96.19 | 0 | 16 | did not advance | | | | | |
| 37 | 48 | Abubakir Bukanov | Uzbekistan | 105.26 | 2 | 40 | 97.57 | 2 | 17 | did not advance | | | | | |
| 38 | 15 | Raffaello Ivaldi | Italy | 91.99 | 0 | 30 | 97.80 | 4 | 18 | did not advance | | | | | |
| 39 | 39 | Michal Wiercioch | Poland | 92.96 | 0 | 34 | 98.55 | 2 | 19 | did not advance | | | | | |
| 40 | 45 | Alex Baldoni | Canada | 94.85 | 2 | 37 | 98.78 | 2 | 20 | did not advance | | | | | |
| 41 | 40 | Kaua Da Silva | Brazil | 105.35 | 6 | 41 | 100.41 | 4 | 21 | did not advance | | | | | |
| 42 | 41 | Shota Saito | Japan | 161.71 | 54 | 49 | 102.98 | 0 | 22 | did not advance | | | | | |
| 43 | 47 | Alibek Temirgaliev | Uzbekistan | 105.79 | 2 | 42 | 104.29 | 0 | 23 | did not advance | | | | | |
| 44 | 43 | Aurimas Kuodis | Lithuania | 153.32 | 6 | 48 | 132.46 | 12 | 24 | did not advance | | | | | |
| 45 | 52 | Rimantas Pumputis | Lithuania | 150.28 | 4 | 47 | 135.17 | 12 | 25 | did not advance | | | | | |
| 46 | 11 | Martin Thomas | France | 89.77 | 0 | 23 | 144.78 | 52 | 26 | did not advance | | | | | |
| 47 | 37 | Kaylen Bassett | Australia | 91.06 | 2 | 27 | 144.84 | 54 | 27 | did not advance | | | | | |
| 48 | 46 | Ricardo Fentanes | Mexico | 168.99 | 10 | 50 | 149.32 | 14 | 28 | did not advance | | | | | |
| 49 | 44 | Wu Jung-Cheng | Chinese Taipei | 125.37 | 4 | 43 | 165.47 | 50 | 29 | did not advance | | | | | |
| 50 | 50 | Samuel Muturi | Kenya | 171.07 | 12 | 51 | 167.81 | 10 | 30 | did not advance | | | | | |
| 51 | 49 | Ismoilbek Abdumanapov | Uzbekistan | 224.96 | 106 | 52 | 180.23 | 54 | 31 | did not advance | | | | | |
| 52 | 51 | Grigorios Komninos | Greece | 130.37 | 8 | 44 | 209.54 | 60 | 32 | did not advance | | | | | |
| 53 | 53 | Matteo-Alexander Olar | Romania | 245.28 | 110 | 53 | 225.19 | 60 | 33 | did not advance | | | | | |
