= 2023 ICF Canoe Slalom World Championships – Men's C1 team =

Men's canoe teams at the 2023 ICF Canoe Slalom World Championships
- Venue: Lee Valley White Water Centre
- Location: London, United Kingdom
- Dates: 19 September 2023
- Competitors: 48 from 16 nations
- Teams: 16

Medalists
| gold medal | Nicolas Gestin; Jules Bernardet; Lucas Roisin | France |
| silver medal | Adam Burgess; Ryan Westley; James Kettle | Great Britain |
| bronze medal | Roberto Colazingari; Raffaello Ivaldi; Paolo Ceccon | Italy |

The men's canoe team event at the 2023 ICF Canoe Slalom World Championships took place on 19 September 2023 at Lee Valley White Water Centre in London.

== Competition format ==
Team events use a single run format with the team with the fastest time including penalties awarded gold. Teams consist of three paddlers from the same country.

Penalties are accumulated for each athlete, such that a team can incur a total of 150 seconds of penalties on a single gate (if all three miss it) or 6 seconds (if all three touch it). The time begins when the first paddler crosses the start beam and ends when the last one crosses the finish beam. All three paddlers must cross the finish line within 15 seconds of each other or else incur an additional 50-second penalty.

The teams had to navigate a total of 18 gates along the course, including 6 upstream gates (4-7-8-11-14-15).

== Results ==
| Rank | Bib | Country | Athletes | Result | | |
| Rank | Bib | Country | Athletes | Time | Pen | Total |
|---|---|---|---|---|---|---|
| 1st place, gold medalist(s) | 11 | France | Nicolas Gestin; Jules Bernardet; Lucas Roisin | 99.17 | 0 | 99.17 |
| 2nd place, silver medalist(s) | 13 | Great Britain | Adam Burgess; Ryan Westley; James Kettle | 99.20 | 0 | 99.20 |
| 3rd place, bronze medalist(s) | 3 | Italy | Roberto Colazingari; Raffaello Ivaldi; Paolo Ceccon | 100.31 | 0 | 100.31 |
| 4 | 1 | Slovenia | Benjamin Savšek; Luka Božič; Žiga Lin Hočevar | 101.46 | 0 | 101.46 |
| 5 | 2 | Slovakia | Alexander Slafkovský; Marko Mirgorodský; Matej Beňuš | 100.13 | 2 | 102.13 |
| 6 | 4 | Germany | Sideris Tasiadis; Franz Anton; Timo Trummer | 100.76 | 2 | 102.76 |
| 7 | 6 | Czech Republic | Václav Chaloupka; Lukáš Rohan; Jiří Prskavec | 103.27 | 0 | 103.27 |
| 8 | 9 | Poland | Grzegorz Hedwig; Kacper Sztuba; Michał Wiercioch | 103.45 | 0 | 103.45 |
| 9 | 12 | Spain | Miquel Travé; Daniel Pérez; Luis Fernández | 105.99 | 2 | 107.99 |
| 10 | 8 | Australia | Tristan Carter; Brodie Crawford; Kaylen Bassett | 109.04 | 2 | 111.04 |
| 11 | 5 | Ireland | Jake Cochrane; Robert Hendrick; Liam Jegou | 109.18 | 2 | 111.18 |
| 12 | 16 | Argentina | Sebastián Rossi; Manuel Trípano; Nicolás Trípano | 111.69 | 0 | 111.69 |
| 13 | 7 | Japan | Takuya Haneda; Shota Sasaki; Shota Saito | 109.84 | 2 | 111.84 |
| 14 | 15 | Uzbekistan | Alibek Temirgaliev; Anvar Klevleev; Abubakir Bukanov | 109.82 | 4 | 113.82 |
| 15 | 10 | China | Xie Yuancong; Zhang Peng; Chen Zhihao | 117.10 | 8 | 125.10 |
| 16 | 14 | United States | Casey Eichfeld; Nathaniel Francis; Zachary Lokken | 118.28 | 58 | 176.28 |
