= 2025 ICF Canoe Slalom World Championships – Men's C1 =

Men's canoe at the 2025 ICF Canoe Slalom World Championships
- Venue: Penrith Whitewater Stadium
- Location: Penrith, Australia
- Dates: 30 September–2 October 2025
- Competitors: 62 from 30 nations

Medalists
gold medal	Nicolas Gestin	France
silver medal	Ryan Westley	Great Britain
bronze medal	Kaylen Bassett	Australia

The men's canoe event at the 2025 ICF Canoe Slalom World Championships took place on 2 October 2025 at the Penrith Whitewater Stadium in Penrith, with the qualification heats run on 30 September 2025.

== Competition format ==
The event uses a three-round format with qualification heats, semifinal and final. The top 30 paddlers from the single qualification run qualify for the semifinal. Paddlers start in the reverse order of their qualification position in the semifinal and complete a single run, with the top 12 advancing to the final. The start list for the final is once again in reverse order of the semifinal results. The athlete with the best time in the single-run final is awarded gold.

A penalty of 2 seconds is awarded for touching a gate and a 50-second penalty is awarded for missing a gate or negotiating it in the opposite direction.

The qualification course had 22 gates including 6 upstream gates (2-7-10-11-15-21). The semifinal and final course had 25 gates with 6 upstream gates (4-5-11-12-20-24).

== Schedule ==
The final was moved forward from 14:33 to 13:03 due to threat of high winds.

All times listed are UTC+10.

Date	Time	Round
30 September 2025
30 September 2025	10:03	Heats
2 October 2025
2 October 2025	10:33	Semifinal
2 October 2025	13:03	Final

== Results ==
Penalties are included in the time shown. The fastest time in each round is shown in bold.

Rank	Bib	Canoeist	Nation	Heats			Semifinal			Final		
Rank	Bib	Canoeist	Nation	Time	Pen	Rank	Time	Pen	Rank	Time	Pen	Rank
1	1	Nicolas Gestin	France	95.70	2	10	**101.66**	2	1	**97.13**	0	1
2	9	Ryan Westley	Great Britain	96.94	0	14	103.94	2	10	98.03	0	2
3	21	Kaylen Bassett	Australia	95.03	0	8	103.42	0	8	98.74	0	3
4	5	Miquel Travé	Spain	94.24	0	3	103.53	0	9	99.60	0	4
5	8	Matej Beňuš	Slovakia	97.23	0	17	102.61	0	3	100.02	0	5
6	16	Kacper Sztuba	Poland	94.11	0	2	107.17	0	12	100.97	0	6
7	4	Luka Božič	Slovenia	94.32	0	4	102.76	0	5	101.60	2	7
8	24	Lennard Tuchscherer	Germany	94.59	0	6	101.94	0	2	103.17	0	8
9	3	Benjamin Savšek	Slovenia	94.54	0	5	106.78	2	11	104.47	4	9
10	19	Michal Martikán	Slovakia	99.35	2	30	103.04	0	6	105.55	4	10
11	32	Oier Díaz	Spain	96.96	0	15	103.41	2	7	106.32	2	11
12	15	Marko Mirgorodský	Slovakia	99.10	2	27	102.66	2	4	106.42	0	12
13	2	Yohann Senechault	France	96.58	2	12	107.44	6	13	did not advance		
14	10	Adam Burgess	Great Britain	96.08	2	11	107.60	2	14	did not advance		
15	12	Paolo Ceccon	Italy	98.65	2	21	107.64	2	15	did not advance		
16	39	Aleksandr Kharlamtsev	Individual Neutral Athletes	99.07	2	26	107.86	0	16	did not advance		
17	23	Thomas Koechlin	Switzerland	94.63	0	7	108.21	0	17	did not advance		
18	17	Martino Barzon	Italy	97.06	2	16	108.44	4	18	did not advance		
19	11	Jiří Prskavec	Czech Republic	97.26	2	18	110.17	0	19	did not advance		
20	41	Benjamin Ross	Australia	99.00	2	24	110.89	0	20	did not advance		
21	35	Marc Vicente	Spain	99.27	2	29	111.89	4	21	did not advance		
22	26	Luc Royle	Great Britain	97.39	0	19	113.34	2	22	did not advance		
23	43	Zhang Zhicheng	China	98.81	2	23	114.72	2	23	did not advance		
24	18	Adam Král	Czech Republic	**93.56**	0	1	116.07	8	24	did not advance		
25	47	Charles Corrêa	Brazil	99.06	2	25	116.86	6	25	did not advance		
26	60	Egor Smirnov	Individual Neutral Athletes	96.60	0	13	130.75	4	26	did not advance		
27	14	Tristan Carter	Australia	95.20	2	9	148.90	50	27	did not advance		
28	30	Robert Hendrick	Ireland	97.48	2	20	157.80	50	28	did not advance		
29	46	Anvar Klevleev	Uzbekistan	99.23	2	28	157.88	54	29	did not advance		
30	20	Vojtěch Heger	Czech Republic	98.71	2	22	160.63	56	30	did not advance		
31	42	Michał Wiercioch	Poland	99.63	2	31	did not advance					
32	28	Dmitrii Khramtsov	Individual Neutral Athletes	99.64	0	32	did not advance					
33	25	Liam Jegou	Ireland	99.68	0	33	did not advance					
34	7	Mewen Debliquy	France	99.92	2	34	did not advance					
35	27	Alex Baldoni	Canada	100.13	0	35	did not advance					
36	40	Zachary Lokken	United States	100.15	2	36	did not advance					
37	45	Kauã da Silva	Brazil	100.16	0	37	did not advance					
38	33	Casey Eichfeld	United States	100.17	2	38	did not advance					
39	37	Joris Otten	Netherlands	100.70	0	39	did not advance					
40	31	Oliver Puchner	New Zealand	101.15	2	40	did not advance					
41	29	Jake Cochrane	Ireland	101.16	2	41	did not advance					
42	36	Szymon Nowobilski	Poland	101.56	6	42	did not advance					
43	48	James Senior	New Zealand	101.77	4	43	did not advance					
44	22	Matija Marinić	Croatia	101.87	2	44	did not advance					
45	51	Finn Anderson	New Zealand	102.72	0	45	did not advance					
46	49	Takuya Haneda	Japan	103.67	4	46	did not advance					
47	34	Manuel Trípano	Argentina	104.48	6	47	did not advance					
48	57	Wabu Youzhuacier	China	105.43	0	48	did not advance					
49	53	Wu Jung-cheng	Chinese Taipei	106.53	2	49	did not advance					
50	50	Shota Saito	Japan	107.21	2	50	did not advance					
51	55	Ryker Harris	Canada	107.31	0	51	did not advance					
52	52	Daniel Parry	Canada	107.74	4	52	did not advance					
53	44	Zhang Peng	China	108.22	6	53	did not advance					
54	13	Flavio Micozzi	Italy	108.37	2	54	did not advance					
55	54	Leonardo Curcel	Paraguay	112.72	0	55	did not advance					
56	61	Mārtiņš Plaudis	Latvia	120.84	6	56	did not advance					
57	59	Ricardo Fentanes	Mexico	126.29	2	57	did not advance					
58	6	Žiga Lin Hočevar	Slovenia	146.59	52	58	did not advance					
59	38	Niels Zimmermann	Germany	148.99	52	59	did not advance					
60	58	Mustafa Parlak	Turkey	163.66	54	60	did not advance					
61	56	Ng Wee Meng	Singapore	380.66	160	61	did not advance					
	62	Samuel Muchiri	Kenya	Did not start								
