= 2025 ICF Canoe Slalom World Championships – Men's C1 team =

Men's canoe teams at the 2025 ICF Canoe Slalom World Championships
- Venue: Penrith Whitewater Stadium
- Location: Penrith, Australia
- Dates: 30 September 2025
- Competitors: 39 from 13 nations
- Teams: 13

Medalists
gold medal	Nicolas Gestin; Mewen Debliquy; Yohann Senechault	France
silver medal	Adam Burgess; Ryan Westley; Luc Royle	Great Britain
bronze medal	Benjamin Savšek; Luka Božič; Žiga Lin Hočevar	Slovenia

The men's canoe team event at the 2025 ICF Canoe Slalom World Championships took place on 30 September 2025 at Penrith Whitewater Stadium in Penrith.

== Competition format ==
Team events use a single run format with the team with the fastest time including penalties awarded gold. Teams consist of three paddlers from the same country.

Penalties are accumulated for each athlete, such that a team can incur a total of 150 seconds of penalties on a single gate (if all three miss it) or 6 seconds (if all three touch it). The time begins when the first paddler crosses the start beam and ends when the last one crosses the finish beam. All three paddlers must cross the finish line within 15 seconds of each other or else incur an additional 50-second penalty.

The teams had to navigate a total of 20 gates along the course, including 6 upstream gates (2-7-10-11-15-20).

== Results ==
Rank	Bib	Country	Athletes	Result		
Rank	Bib	Country	Athletes	Time	Pen	Total
1st place, gold medalist(s)	1	France	Nicolas Gestin; Mewen Debliquy; Yohann Senechault	99.97	0	99.97
2nd place, silver medalist(s)	2	Great Britain	Adam Burgess; Ryan Westley; Luc Royle	100.76	0	100.76
3rd place, bronze medalist(s)	4	Slovenia	Benjamin Savšek; Luka Božič; Žiga Lin Hočevar	98.86	2	100.86
4	9	Australia	Tristan Carter; Kaylen Bassett; Benjamin Ross	101.29	0	101.29
5	3	Italy	Flavio Micozzi; Martino Barzon; Paolo Ceccon	101.38	0	101.38
6	10	Ireland	Robert Hendrick; Liam Jegou; Jake Cochrane	102.66	0	102.66
7	8	Spain	Miquel Travé; Oier Díaz; Marc Vicente	104.19	0	104.19
8	6	Czech Republic	Jiří Prskavec; Vojtěch Heger; Adam Král	101.98	4	105.98
9	5	Slovakia	Matej Beňuš; Marko Mirgorodský; Michal Martikán	104.43	4	108.43
10	7	Poland	Kacper Sztuba; Michał Wiercioch; Szymon Nowobilski	104.53	4	108.53
11	13	Canada	Alex Baldoni; Daniel Parry; Ryker Harris	112.65	2	114.65
12	12	New Zealand	Oliver Puchner; Finn Anderson; James Senior	108.03	8	116.03
13	11	China	Zhang Peng; Wabu Youzhuacier; Zhang Zhicheng	115.58	2	117.58
