= Benjamin Savšek =

Slovenian canoeist (born 1987)

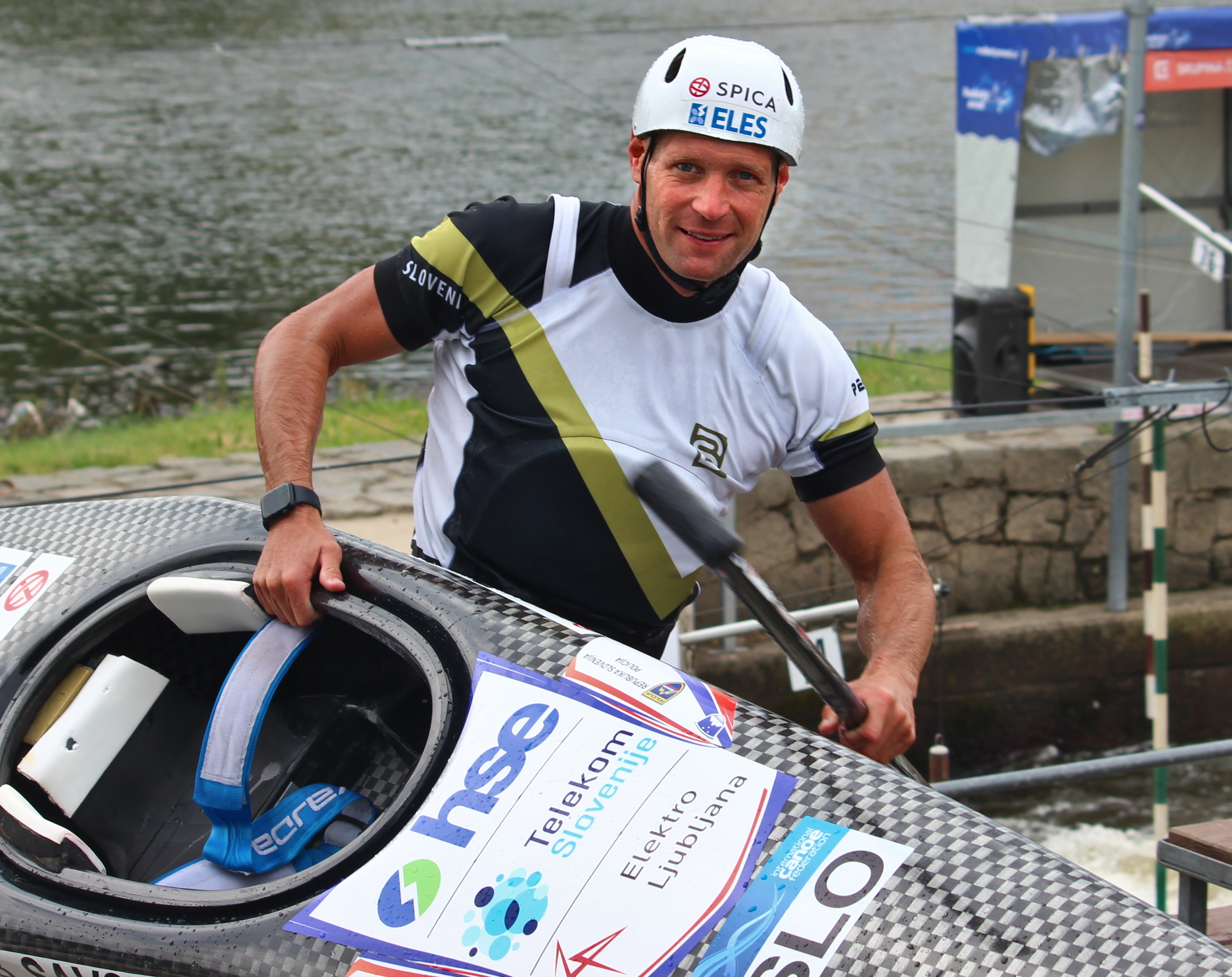
- Savšek in 2023

Personal information
- Nationality: Slovenian
- Born: 24 March 1987 (age 39) Ljubljana, SR Slovenia, SFR Yugoslavia
- Height: 1.77 m (5 ft 10 in)
- Weight: 74 kg (163 lb)

Sport
- Country: Slovenia
- Sport: Canoe slalom
- Event: C1
- Club: KKK Tacen
Medal record
Men's canoe slalom
Representing Slovenia
Event	1st	2nd	3rd
Olympic Games	1	0	0
World Championships	3	3	4
European Championships	8	2	4
U23 European Championships	1	2	1
Total	13	7	9
Olympic Games
Gold medal – first place	2020 Tokyo	C1
World Championships
Gold medal – first place	2017 Pau	C1
Gold medal – first place	2022 Augsburg	C1 team
Gold medal – first place	2023 London	C1
Silver medal – second place	2014 Deep Creek Lake	C1
Silver medal – second place	2015 London	C1
Silver medal – second place	2018 Rio de Janeiro	C1 team
Bronze medal – third place	2013 Prague	C1
Bronze medal – third place	2014 Deep Creek Lake	C1 team
Bronze medal – third place	2015 London	C1 team
Bronze medal – third place	2025 Penrith	C1 team
European Championships
Gold medal – first place	2014 Vienna	C1 team
Gold medal – first place	2015 Markkleeberg	C1
Gold medal – first place	2019 Pau	C1
Gold medal – first place	2019 Pau	C1 team
Gold medal – first place	2020 Prague	C1
Gold medal – first place	2020 Prague	C1 team
Gold medal – first place	2022 Liptovský Mikuláš	C1
Gold medal – first place	2024 Tacen	C1 team
Silver medal – second place	2017 Tacen	C1 team
Silver medal – second place	2025 Vaires-sur-Marne	C1 team
Bronze medal – third place	2012 Augsburg	C1
Bronze medal – third place	2013 Kraków	C1 team
Bronze medal – third place	2021 Ivrea	C1 team
Bronze medal – third place	2024 Tacen	C1
U23 European Championships
Gold medal – first place	2009 Liptovský Mikuláš	C1 team
Silver medal – second place	2006 Nottingham	C1 team
Silver medal – second place	2010 Markkleeberg	C1 team
Bronze medal – third place	2008 Solkan	C1

Benjamin Savšek (born 24 March 1987) is a Slovenian slalom canoeist who has competed at the international level since 2002, specializing in the C1 discipline. With an Olympic gold, 2 individual world titles and 4 individual European titles, he is one of the most successful C1 paddlers of his generation.

Savšek competed at four Olympic Games. His first appearance was at the 2012 Summer Olympics where he finished in 8th place in the C1 event. He finished in 6th place in the same event four years later at the 2016 Summer Olympics in Rio de Janeiro. At the 2020 Summer Olympics in Tokyo he won gold in the C1 event after completing a clean run in the final. He also competed at the 2024 Summer Olympics in Paris, finishing 11th in the C1 event and 12th in kayak cross.

Savšek won ten medals at the ICF Canoe Slalom World Championships including 5 individual medals. He won gold in the C1 event in 2017 in Pau and then again in 2023 in London. He also has two silvers (2014 and 2015) and a bronze (2013). The other five medals came from the C1 team events as part of the Slovenian team. These include a gold in 2022, a silver in 2018 and three bronzes in 2014, 2015 and 2025.

Savšek also won 14 medals at the European Canoe Slalom Championships (8 golds, 2 silver and 4 bronzes). Six of these medals are individual (4 golds and 2 bronzes).

Savšek has also had success in the World Cup where he has collected 5 victories and 19 podiums as of 2023. He is yet to win the overall title, however, finishing in the runner-up position of 4 occasions (2009, 2015, 2017 and 2021). He finished in the top ten of the overall standings every year from 2009 to 2023 (with the exception of the 2020 season when there were no World Cup final rankings due to the COVID-19 pandemic).

Savšek was the year-end World No. 1 in C1 event in 2015 and 2022.

== Career statistics ==
=== Major championships results timeline ===
Event		2008	2009	2010	2011	2012	2013	2014	2015	2016	2017	2018	2019	2020	2021	2022	2023	2024	2025	2026
Olympic Games	C1	—	Not held			8	Not held			6	Not held				1	Not held		11	Not held	
Olympic Games	Kayak cross	Not held																12	Not held	
World Championships	C1	Not held	19	7	17	Not held	3	2	2	Not held	1	7	18	Not held	9	4	1	Not held	9	12
World Championships	C1 team	Not held	4	5	12	Not held	4	3	3	Not held	5	2	6	Not held	5	1	4	Not held	3	4
European Championships	C1	18	10	6	13	3	27	6	1	12	4	11	1	1	6	1	6 (Note: 2023 European Games)	3	11	20
European Championships	C1 team	6	6	6	8	5	3	1	9	9	2	5	1	1	3	10	8	1	2	11

=== World Cup individual podiums ===
	1st place, gold medalist(s)	2nd place, silver medalist(s)	3rd place, bronze medalist(s)	Total
C1	6	6	9	21

Season	Date	Venue	Position	Event
2009	3 August 2009	Kananaskis	2nd	C1^{1}
2010	19 June 2010	Prague	2nd	C1
2012	25 August 2012	Prague	1st	C1
2014	14 June 2014	Tacen	1st	C1
2014	21 June 2014	Prague	3rd	C1
2015	20 June 2015	Prague	2nd	C1
2015	27 June 2015	Kraków	3rd	C1
2015	8 August 2015	La Seu d'Urgell	3rd	C1
2016	3 September 2016	Prague	3rd	C1
2016	10 September 2016	Tacen	1st	C1
2017	10 September 2017	La Seu d'Urgell	1st	C1
2021	13 June 2021	Prague	3rd	C1
2021	20 June 2021	Markkleeberg	3rd	C1
2021	12 September 2021	Pau	2nd	C1
2022	19 June 2022	Kraków	2nd	C1
2022	26 June 2022	Tacen	3rd	C1
2022	28 August 2022	Pau	3rd	C1
2023	10 June 2023	Prague	1st	C1
2023	16 June 2023	Tacen	3rd	C1
2024	8 June 2024	Prague	2nd	C1
2024	14 September 2024	Ivrea	1st	C1

^{1} Pan American Championship counting for World Cup points

Olympic Games
Preceded by Eva Terčelj and Bojan Tokić	Flagbearer for Slovenia; Paris 2024	Succeeded by Incumbent
