= Marko Mirgorodský =

Slovak slalom canoeist (b. 1998)

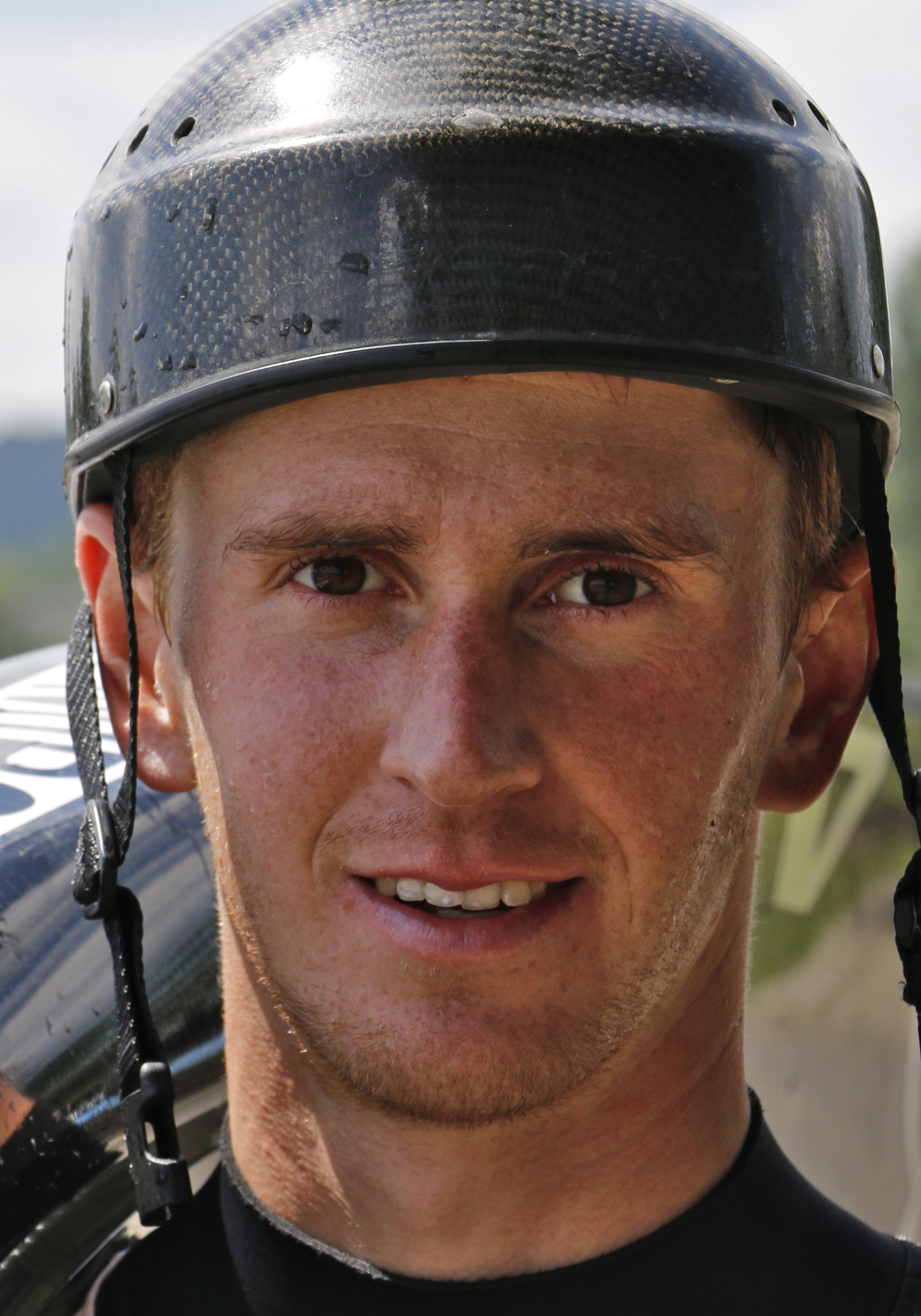

Personal information
- Nationality: Slovak
- Born: 4 November 1998 (age 27) Liptovský Mikuláš, Slovakia

Sport
- Country: Slovakia
- Sport: Canoe slalom
- Event: C1
- Club: Kanoe Tatra Klub
Medal record
Men's canoe slalom
Representing Slovakia
World Championships
Silver medal – second place	2022 Augsburg	C1 team
Bronze medal – third place	2021 Bratislava	C1 team
European Games
Silver medal – second place	2023 Kraków	C1 team
European Championships
Silver medal – second place	2018 Prague	C1 team
Bronze medal – third place	2024 Tacen	C1 team
Bronze medal – third place	2025 Vaires-sur-Marne	C1 team
Youth Olympic Games
Bronze medal – third place	2014 Nanjing	C1
U23 World Championships
Gold medal – first place	2017 Bratislava	C1
Silver medal – second place	2019 Kraków	C1 team
Junior World Championships
Gold medal – first place	2014 Penrith	C1 team
Gold medal – first place	2015 Foz do Iguaçu	C1
Gold medal – first place	2016 Kraków	C1
U23 European Championships
Gold medal – first place	2017 Hohenlimburg	C1
Silver medal – second place	2018 Bratislava	C1 team
Silver medal – second place	2019 Liptovský Mikuláš	C1
Junior European Championships
Gold medal – first place	2015 Kraków	C1
Silver medal – second place	2016 Solkan	C1

Marko Mirgorodský (born 4 November 1998) is a Slovak slalom canoeist who has competed at the international level since 2013, specializing in the C1 discipline.

Mirgorodský won two medals in the C1 team event at the ICF Canoe Slalom World Championships with a silver in 2022 and a bronze in 2021. He also won four medals (2 silvers and 2 bronzes) in the same event at the European Championships, including a bronze at the 2023 European Games in Kraków.

He is a one-time World U23 Champion (2017) and two-time World Junior Champion (2015 & 2016) in the C1 discipline.

He competed in the Boys' C1 Obstacle Canoe Slalom at the 2014 Youth Olympic Games in Nanjing, winning a bronze medal.

== Career statistics ==
=== Major championships results timeline ===
Event		2018	2019	2020	2021	2022	2023	2024	2025	2026
World Championships	C1	—	—	Not held	30	53	14	Not held	12	4
World Championships	C1 team	—	—	Not held	3	2	5	Not held	9	9
European Championships	C1	7	6	—	—	6	18 (Note: 2023 European Games)	17	10	5
European Championships	C1 team	2	4	—	—	4	2	3	3	6

=== World Cup individual podiums ===
Season	Date	Venue	Position	Event
2023	1 September 2023	La Seu d'Urgell	3rd	C1
2024	1 June 2024	Augsburg	2nd	C1
2026	6 June 2026	Prague	2nd	C1

=== Complete World Cup results ===
Year	WC1	WC2	WC3	WC4	WC5	Points	Position
2016	Ivrea (Italy); 24	La Seu (Spain); 28	Pau (France); 19	Prague (Czech Republic); 13	Tacen (Slovenia)	80	28th
2018	Liptovský Mikuláš (Slovakia); 20	Kraków (Poland); 18	Augsburg (Germany); 4	Tacen (Slovenia); 17	La Seu (Spain); 14	178	11th
2021	Prague (Czech Republic); 4	Markkleeberg (Germany); 5	La Seu (Spain); 5	Pau (France); 11		198	5th
