= Roberto Colazingari =

Italian slalom canoeist (born 1993)

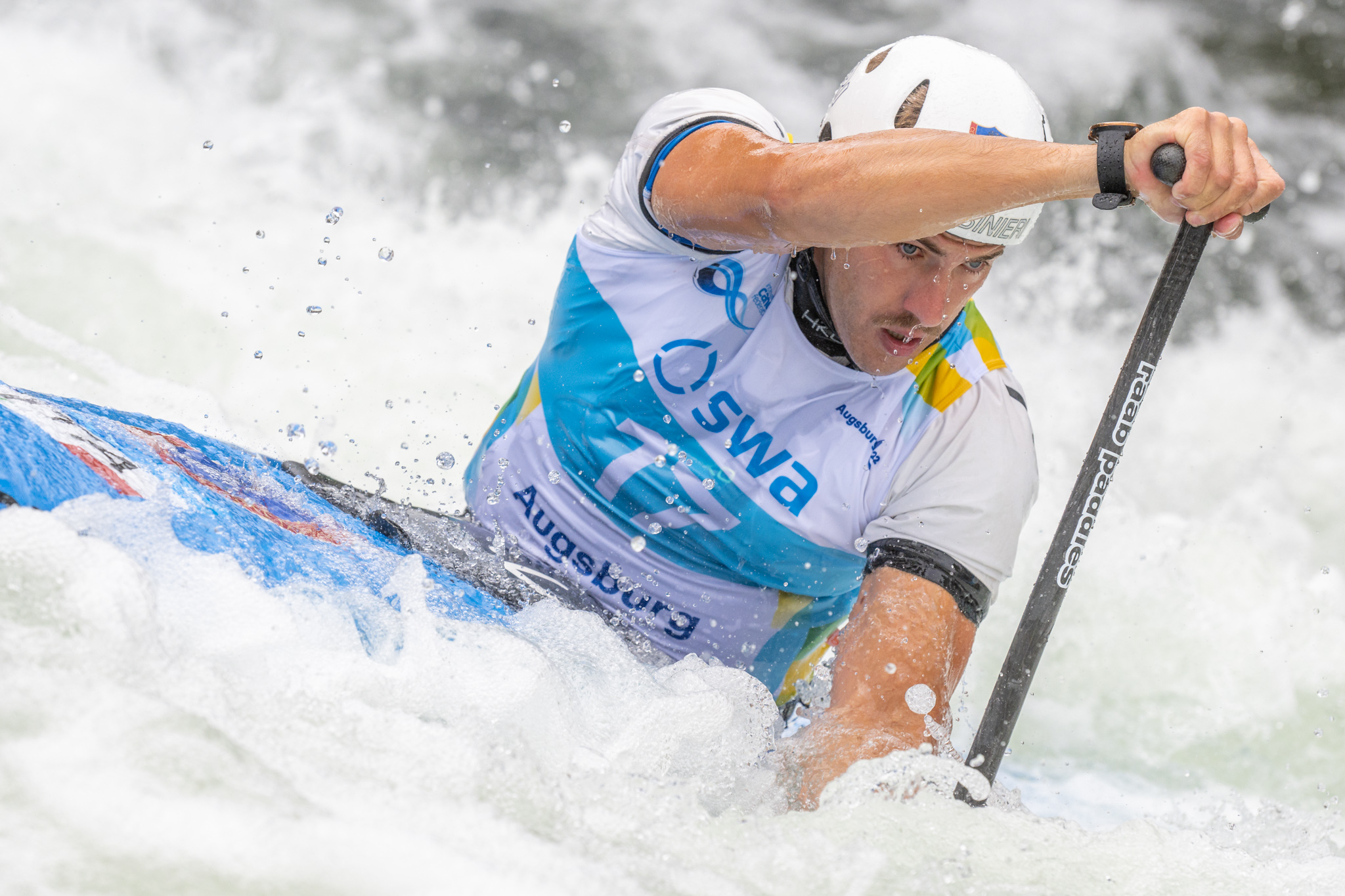
- Roberto Colazingari in 2022

Personal information
- Nationality: Italian
- Born: 7 April 1993 (age 33)
- Home town: Subiaco, Lazio

Sport
- Country: Italy
- Sport: Canoe slalom
- Event(s): C1 & C2
- Club: C.S. Carabinieri
- Coached by: Daniele Molmenti
Medal record
Men's canoe slalom
Representing Italy
World Championships
Bronze medal – third place	2022 Augsburg	C1 team
Bronze medal – third place	2023 London	C1 team
European Championships
Silver medal – second place	2021 Ivrea	C1 team
Bronze medal – third place	2017 Tacen	C1 team
U23 World Championships
Gold medal – first place	2012 Wausau	C1
Gold medal – first place	2014 Penrith	C1
Gold medal – first place	2015 Foz do Iguaçu	C1 team
U23 European Championships
Silver medal – second place	2015 Kraków	C1 team
Bronze medal – third place	2012 Solkan	C1
Junior World Championships
Bronze medal – third place	2010 Foix	C1
Junior European Championships
Gold medal – first place	2011 Banja Luka	C1

Roberto Colazingari (born 7 May 1993) is an Italian slalom canoeist who has competed at the international level since 2008. He is from Subiaco and trains with C.S. Carabinieri, coached by 2012 Olympic Champion Daniele Molmenti. Roberto competed internationally in the C2 discipline in 2011 and 2012, now competing solely in C1.

Colazingari won two bronze medals in the C1 team event at the ICF Canoe Slalom World Championships, earning them in 2022 and 2023. Roberto has also won two medals at the European Championships in the C1 team event with a bronze in 2017 and a silver in 2021 at Tacen and Ivrea, respectively. His best senior world championship results are 5th (C1: 2017, Pau) and 42nd (C2: 2011, Bratislava).

Roberto formed part of an historic triple victory for Italy, winning gold in C1 at the 2019 Canoe Slalom World Cup in Tacen to accompany Stefanie Horn and Giovanni De Gennaro's gold medals in women's and men's K1.

Colazingari has won three gold medals at the U23 World Championships in the C1 team (2015) and C1 (2012, 2014) events. The two individual medals made him the first to win the title twice, an achievement met only by Nicolas Gestin in 2021.

Colazingari began paddling with Subiaco Canoanium Club before joining Corpo Forestale dello Stato on 19 June 2012. He is now a member of the Carabinieri, Italy's national gendarmerie, after it absorbed the State Forestry Corps at the end of 2016.

== Results ==
=== World Cup individual podiums ===
Season	Date	Venue	Position	Event
2019	29 June 2019	Tacen	1st	C1

=== Complete World Cup results ===
Year	WC1	WC2	WC3	WC4	WC5	Points	Position
2008	Continent	Prague (Czech Republic); 32	Tacen (Slovenia)	Augsburg (Germany)		2	96th
2009	Continent	Pau (France)	Bratislava (Slovakia); 41	Augsburg (Germany); 42		4	51st
2010	Continent	Prague (Czech Republic); 32	La Seu (Spain); 45	Augsburg (Germany)		4	88th
2011	Tacen (Slovenia); 17	L'Argentière (France); 33	Markkleeberg (Germany); 33	Prague (Czech Republic)		30	39th
2012	Cardiff (United Kingdom)	Pau (France); 50	La Seu (Spain)	Prague (Czech Republic); 12	Bratislava (Slovakia); 27	44	33rd
2013	Cardiff (United Kingdom)	Augsburg (Germany)	La Seu (Spain); 19	Tacen (Slovenia); 15	Bratislava (Slovakia); 30	57	29th
2014	Lee Valley (United Kingdom); 30	Tacen (Slovenia); 16	Prague (Czech Republic); 12	La Seu (Spain)	Augsburg (Germany)	63	31st
2015	Prague (Czech Republic)	Kraków (Poland)	Liptovský Mikuláš (Slovakia)	La Seu (Spain)	Pau (France); 20	46	51st
2016	Ivrea (Italy); 5	La Seu (Spain); 21	Pau (France); 33	Prague (Czech Republic); 20	Tacen (Slovenia); 17	143	15th
2017	Prague (Czech Republic); 16	Augsburg (Germany); 15	Markkleeberg (Germany); 13	Ivrea (Italy); 13	La Seu (Spain); 24	149	15th
2018	Liptovský Mikuláš (Slovakia); 34	Kraków (Poland); 12	Augsburg (Germany); 15	Tacen (Slovenia)	La Seu (Spain); 23	92	25th
2019	Lee Valley (United Kingdom); 22	Bratislava (Slovakia)	Tacen (Slovenia); 1	Markkleeberg (Germany); 20	Prague (Czech Republic); 14	162	7th
2021	Prague (Czech Republic); 13	Markkleeberg (Germany); 19	La Seu (Spain); 26	Pau (France); 24		101	18th
