= 2022 ICF Canoe Slalom World Championships =

2022 World Championships
- Venue: Augsburg Eiskanal
- Location: Augsburg, Germany
- Dates: 26–31 July

The 2022 ICF Canoe Slalom World Championships took place from 26 to 31 July 2022 in Augsburg, Germany under the auspices of International Canoe Federation (ICF). It was the 42nd edition. The events took place at the Augsburg Eiskanal. Augsburg hosted the championships for the fourth time after previously hosting in 1957, 1985 and 2003.

The championships took place 50 years after canoe slalom first appeared at the Summer Olympics when the events were held on the same course.

A total of 380 athletes from 70 countries participated in the event. Russia and Belarus were excluded from participation due to the 2022 Russian invasion of Ukraine.

== Schedule ==
Ten medal events were contested.

All times listed are UTC+2.

| Date | Starting Time | Events |
|---|---|---|
| 27 July | 09:30 | K1W, K1M, C1W, C1M teams |
| 28 July | 09:15 | K1W, K1M heats – 1st run |
| 28 July | 14:15 | K1W, K1M heats – 2nd run |
| 29 July | 09:15 | C1W, C1M heats – 1st run |
| 29 July | 14:00 | C1W, C1M heats – 2nd run |
| 30 July | 09:03 | K1W, K1M semifinals |
| 30 July | 12:05 | K1W, K1M finals |
| 30 July | 16:00 | Extreme slalom Women & Men – Time trials |
| 31 July | 09:03 | C1W, C1M semifinals |
| 31 July | 11:35 | C1W, C1M finals |
| 31 July | 15:00 | Extreme slalom Women & Men – Heats |
| 31 July | 16:03 | Extreme slalom Women & Men – Quarterfinals |
| 31 July | 16:39 | Extreme slalom Women & Men – Semifinals |
| 31 July | 16:59 | Extreme slalom Women & Men – Finals |

== Medal summary ==
=== Medal table ===
* Host nation (Germany)

| Rank | Nation | Gold | Silver | Bronze | Total |
|---|---|---|---|---|---|
| 1 | Germany* | 5 | 1 | 3 | 9 |
| 2 | Czech Republic | 2 | 0 | 0 | 2 |
| 3 | Great Britain | 1 | 2 | 2 | 5 |
| 4 | Australia | 1 | 2 | 0 | 3 |
| 5 | Slovenia | 1 | 1 | 0 | 2 |
| 6 | Slovakia | 0 | 2 | 0 | 2 |
| 7 | France | 0 | 1 | 2 | 3 |
| 8 | Italy | 0 | 1 | 1 | 2 |
| 9 | Andorra | 0 | 0 | 1 | 1 |
| 9 | Poland | 0 | 0 | 1 | 1 |
| Totals (10 entries) | | 10 | 10 | 10 | 30 |

=== Men ===
==== Canoe ====
| Event | Gold | | Silver | | Bronze | |
|---|---|---|---|---|---|---|
| C1 | Sideris Tasiadis; Germany | 101.05 | Alexander Slafkovský; Slovakia | 102.23 | Franz Anton; Germany | 102.66 |
| C1 team | Slovenia; Benjamin Savšek; Luka Božič; Anže Berčič | 95.48 | Slovakia; Matej Beňuš; Marko Mirgorodský; Alexander Slafkovský | 98.42 | Italy; Roberto Colazingari; Raffaello Ivaldi; Paolo Ceccon | 100.64 |

==== Kayak ====
| Event | Gold | | Silver | | Bronze | |
|---|---|---|---|---|---|---|
| K1 | Vít Přindiš; Czech Republic | 94.78 | Giovanni De Gennaro; Italy | 95.49 | Boris Neveu; France | 95.75 |
| K1 team | Germany; Hannes Aigner; Noah Hegge; Stefan Hengst | 91.90 | Great Britain; Joseph Clarke; Christopher Bowers; Bradley Forbes-Cryans | 93.68 | France; Boris Neveu; Titouan Castryck; Malo Quéméneur | 95.67 |
| Extreme | Joseph Clarke; Great Britain | | Anatole Delassus; France | | Stefan Hengst; Germany | |

=== Women ===
==== Canoe ====
| Event | Gold | | Silver | | Bronze | |
|---|---|---|---|---|---|---|
| C1 | Andrea Herzog; Germany | 111.72 | Jessica Fox; Australia | 112.64 | Mallory Franklin; Great Britain | 117.05 |
| C1 team | Czech Republic; Gabriela Satková; Tereza Fišerová; Martina Satková | 115.35 | Germany; Elena Lilik; Andrea Herzog; Nele Bayn | 116.85 | Great Britain; Mallory Franklin; Kimberley Woods; Sophie Ogilvie | 117.85 |

==== Kayak ====
| Event | Gold | | Silver | | Bronze | |
|---|---|---|---|---|---|---|
| K1 | Ricarda Funk; Germany | 101.14 | Jessica Fox; Australia | 102.45 | Elena Lilik; Germany | 103.99 |
| K1 team | Germany; Ricarda Funk; Elena Lilik; Jasmin Schornberg | 102.78 | Slovenia; Eva Terčelj; Eva Alina Hočevar; Ajda Novak | 105.26 | Poland; Klaudia Zwolińska; Natalia Pacierpnik; Dominika Brzeska | 109.25 |
| Extreme | Jessica Fox; Australia | | Kimberley Woods; Great Britain | | Mònica Dòria Vilarrubla; Andorra | |
