= Ryan Westley =

British slalom canoeist (born 1993)

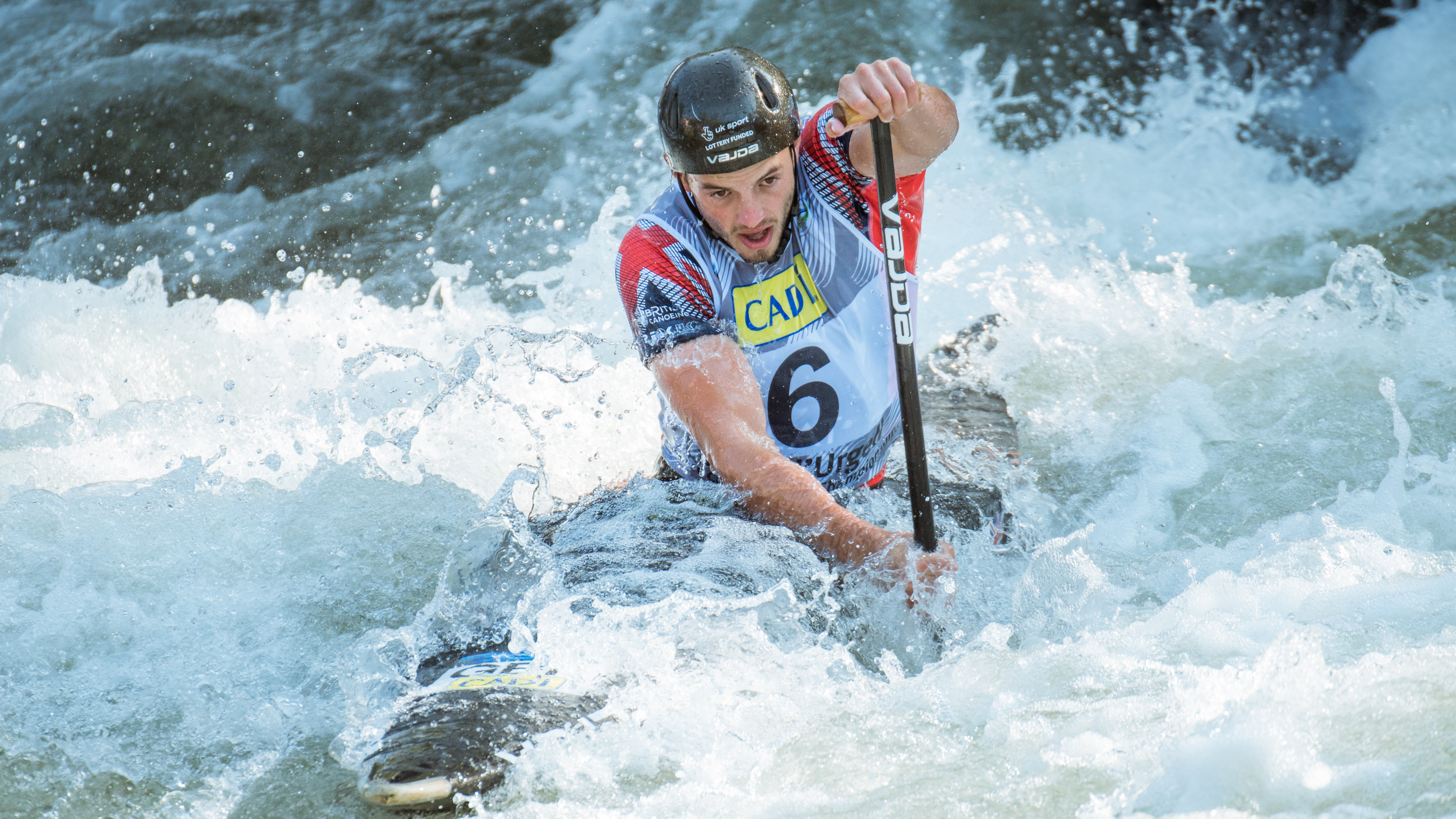

Personal information
- Nationality: British
- Born: 19 August 1993 (age 33) Exeter, England
- Height: 1.81 m (5 ft 11 in)
- Weight: 79 kg (174 lb)

Sport
- Country: Great Britain
- Sport: Canoe slalom
- Event: C1, C2
- Club: Lower Wharfe Canoe Club
Medal record
Men's canoe slalom
Representing Great Britain
World Championships
Gold medal – first place	2026 Oklahoma City	C1 team
Silver medal – second place	2017 Pau	C1 team
Silver medal – second place	2018 Rio de Janeiro	C1
Silver medal – second place	2023 London	C1 team
Silver medal – second place	2025 Penrith	C1
Silver medal – second place	2025 Penrith	C1 team
Bronze medal – third place	2015 London	C1
Bronze medal – third place	2018 Rio de Janeiro	C1 team
European Games
Gold medal – first place	2023 Kraków	C1
Bronze medal – third place	2023 Kraków	C1 team
European Championships
Gold medal – first place	2018 Prague	C1
Gold medal – first place	2025 Vaires-sur-Marne	C1 team
Bronze medal – third place	2015 Markkleeberg	C1 team
Bronze medal – third place	2016 Liptovský Mikuláš	C1 team
U23 World Championships
Silver medal – second place	2016 Kraków	C1 team
U23 European Championships
Gold medal – first place	2016 Solkan	C1
Silver medal – second place	2014 Skopje	C2
Silver medal – second place	2014 Skopje	C1 team
Junior World Championships
Gold medal – first place	2010 Foix	C1 team
Junior European Championships
Silver medal – second place	2010 Markkleeberg	C2 team
Silver medal – second place	2011 Banja Luka	C2 team

Ryan Westley (born 19 August 1993) is a British slalom canoeist who has competed at the international level since 2009.

He won eight medals at the World Championships with one gold (C1 team: 2026), five silvers (C1: 2018, 2025, C1 team: 2017, 2023, 2025) and two bronzes (C1: 2015, C1 team: 2018).

He also won six medals (3–0–3) at the European Championships, including a gold and a bronze at the 2023 European Games in Kraków.

== World Cup individual podiums ==
Season	Date	Venue	Position	Event
2016	3 September 2016	Prague	2nd	C1
2018	23 June 2018	Liptovský Mikuláš	3rd	C1
2019	15 June 2019	Lee Valley	3rd	C1
2024	15 June 2024	Kraków	3rd	C1
2024	21 September 2024	La Seu d'Urgell	2nd	C1
2025	14 June 2025	Pau	1st	C1
2026	4 September 2026	Vaires-sur-Marne	3rd	C1
