= Nicolas Gestin =

French slalom canoeist

Nicolas Gestin CLH OLY
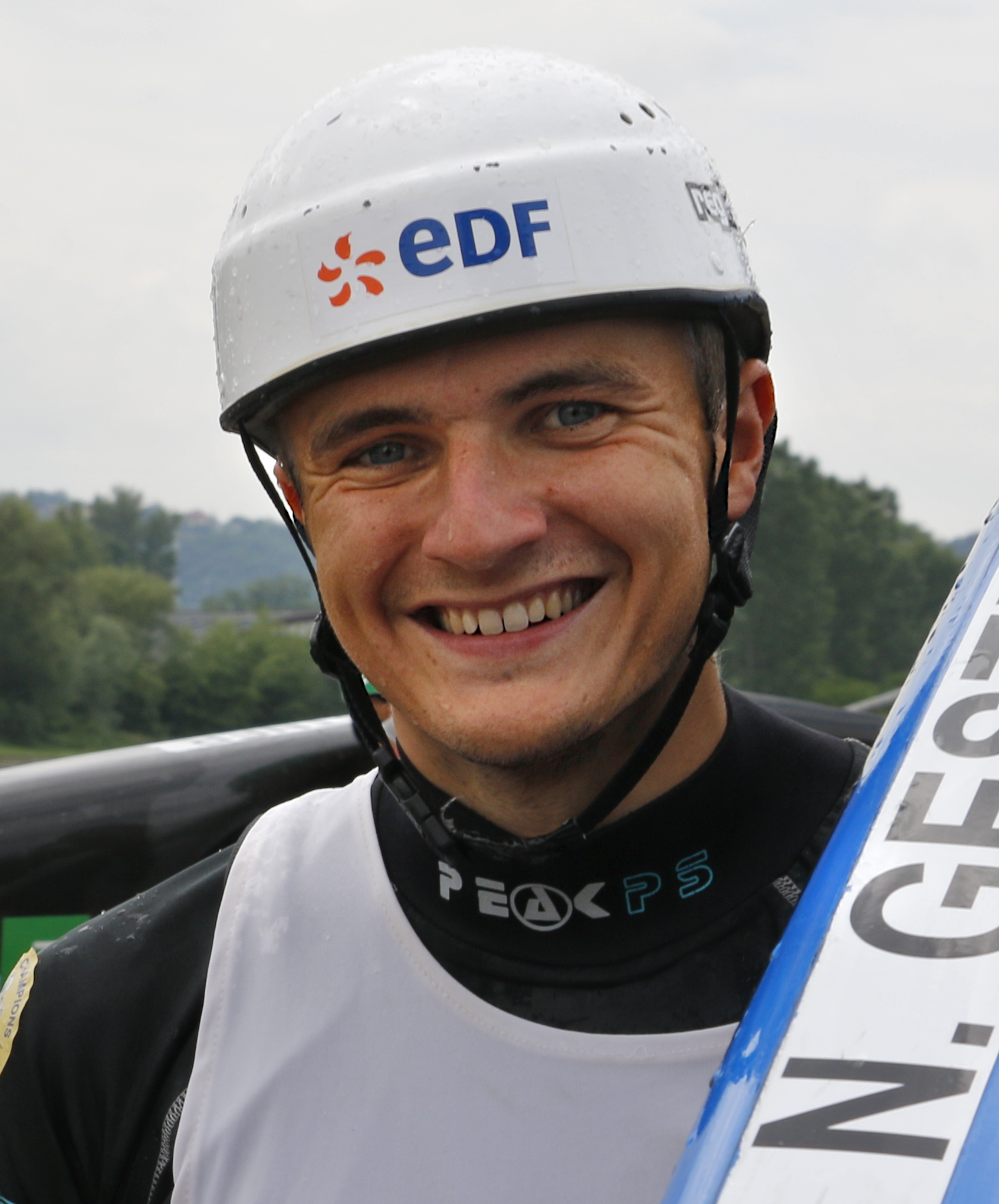
- Gestin in 2024

Personal information
- Nationality: French
- Born: 30 March 2000 (age 26)
- Home town: Tréméven, France

Sport
- Country: France
- Sport: Canoe slalom
- Event: C1
- Club: Canoë Kayak Club Quimperlé
- Coached by: Arnaud Brogniart
Medal record
Men's canoe slalom
Representing France
Olympic Games
Gold medal – first place	2024 Paris	C1
World Championships
Gold medal – first place	2021 Bratislava	C1 team
Gold medal – first place	2023 London	C1 team
Gold medal – first place	2025 Penrith	C1
Gold medal – first place	2025 Penrith	C1 team
Silver medal – second place	2023 London	C1
Silver medal – second place	2026 Oklahoma City	C1 team
European Championships
Gold medal – first place	2026 Ivrea	C1 team
Silver medal – second place	2025 Vaires-sur-Marne	C1
U23 World Championships
Gold medal – first place	2019 Kraków	C1
Gold medal – first place	2021 Tacen	C1
Bronze medal – third place	2021 Tacen	C1 team
U23 European Championships
Gold medal – first place	2019 Liptovský Mikuláš	C1
Junior World Championships
Gold medal – first place	2018 Ivrea	C1 team
Bronze medal – third place	2016 Kraków	C1 team
Bronze medal – third place	2018 Ivrea	C1
Junior European Championships
Silver medal – second place	2018 Bratislava	C1
Silver medal – second place	2018 Bratislava	C1 team

Nicolas Gestin pronounced [nikɔla ʒɛstɛ̃] (born 30 March 2000) is a French slalom canoeist who has competed at the international level since 2016. He is from Tréméven, Finistère in Brittany. He became Olympic Champion on home soil at the 2024 Summer Olympics in the C1 event.

== Career ==
=== Junior ===
Gestin began paddling with his local club, Canoë Kayak Club Quimperlé. He made his first junior team in 2016, finishing 5th individually at the Junior Worlds in Kraków, also earning a bronze in the C1 team event. Nicolas received €1,000 from the Quimperlé community to help finance international travel. He dislocated his shoulder in August 2016, resulting in him missing the 2016 Junior Europeans and selection for the 2017 team. Gestin's breakthrough season was his last as a junior, where he earned four medals and made two World Cup finals. At the 2018 Junior Europeans he won a silver medal in both C1 and C1 team, followed by a gold in C1 team and a bronze individually at the 2018 Junior Worlds in Ivrea.

=== U23 ===
Gestin has won three medals at the U23 World Championships with two golds in C1 (2019, 2021) and a bronze in the C1 team event (2021). By winning the 2021 championship, Gestin became only the second athlete to win the title twice (after Roberto Colazingari) and the first to win it at consecutive events. Nicolas also won a gold medal in C1 at the 2019 U23 Europeans, an event which he did not compete in the following two years (in 2021 in order to prepare for the World Championships).

=== Senior ===
Nicolas' first races at the senior level were the last two World Cups of the 2018 season where he made both finals finishing 8th and 10th in Tacen and La Seu, respectively. He won a silver medal at the 2020 World Cup in Tacen. Gestin was coached by 1993 and 1995 vice world champion Anne Boixel until 2021 and now by French national team coach Arnaud Brogniart. He participated in the French selection trials for the 2020 Summer Olympics, finishing 6th. Gestin finished 5th at the 2021 European Championships in Ivrea.

Gestin won the gold medal in the men's C1 at the 2024 Summer Olympics.

He won six medals at the World Championships with four golds (C1: 2025, C1 team: 2021, 2023, 2025) and two silvers (C1: 2023, C1 team: 2026). He finished 4th in the C1 event in at the 2021 World Championships.

He won one gold and one silver medal at the European Championships.

Gestin won the overall World Cup title in the C1 class in 2022 and 2025.

== Results ==
=== World Cup individual podiums ===
	1st place, gold medalist(s)	2nd place, silver medalist(s)	3rd place, bronze medalist(s)	Total
C1	6	2	4	12

Season	Date	Venue	Position	Event
2020	18 October 2020	Tacen	2nd	C1
2022	12 June 2022	Prague	2nd	C1
2022	19 June 2022	Kraków	1st	C1
2022	4 September 2022	La Seu d'Urgell	1st	C1
2024	1 June 2024	Augsburg	3rd	C1
2024	8 June 2024	Prague	3rd	C1
2025	7 June 2025	La Seu d'Urgell	3rd	C1
2025	28 June 2025	Prague	1st	C1
2025	30 August 2025	Tacen	1st	C1
2025	6 September 2025	Augsburg	1st	C1
2026	6 June 2026	Prague	1st	C1
2026	12 September 2026	La Seu d'Urgell	3rd	C1

=== Complete World Cup results ===
Year	WC1	WC2	WC3	WC4	WC5	Points	Position
2018	Liptovský Mikuláš (Slovakia)	Kraków (Poland)	Augsburg (Germany)	Tacen (Slovenia); 8	La Seu (Spain); 10	106	21st
2019	Lee Valley (United Kingdom)	Bratislava (Slovakia)	Tacen (Slovenia); 8	Markkleeberg (Germany); 15	Prague (Czech Republic)	66	30th
2020	Tacen (Slovenia); 2	Pau (France)				N/A^{[a]}	
2021	Prague (Czech Republic); 19	Markkleeberg (Germany); 39	La Seu (Spain); 9	Pau (France); 8		138	12th
2022	Prague (Czech Republic); 2	Kraków (Poland); 1	Tacen (Slovenia); 15	Pau (France); 4	La Seu (Spain); 1	309	1st
2023	Augsburg (Germany); 4	Prague (Czech Republic); 26	Tacen (Slovenia)	La Seu (Spain); 7	Pau (France); 6	183	8th
2024	Augsburg (Germany); 3	Prague (Czech Republic); 3	Kraków (Poland)	Ivrea (Italy)	La Seu (Spain); 11	164	13th
2025	La Seu (Spain); 3	Pau (France); 35	Prague (Czech Republic); 1	Tacen (Slovenia); 1	Augsburg (Germany); 1	292	1st

Notes
^{a} No overall rankings were determined by the ICF, with only two races possible due to the COVID-19 pandemic.

=== Complete Championship results ===
Year	Level	Venue	Event	Result
2016	Junior World	(Poland) Kraków	C1 team	3rd
2016	Junior World	(Poland) Kraków	C1	5th
2018	Junior European	(Slovakia) Bratislava	C1 team	2nd
2018	Junior European	(Slovakia) Bratislava	C1	2nd
2018	Junior World	(Italy) Ivrea	C1 team	1st
2018	Junior World	(Italy) Ivrea	C1	3rd
2019	U23 European	(Slovakia) Liptovský Mikuláš	C1 team	9th
2019	U23 European	(Slovakia) Liptovský Mikuláš	C1	1st
2019	U23 World	(Poland) Kraków	C1 team	4th
2019	U23 World	(Poland) Kraków	C1	1st
2021	U23 World	(Slovenia) Tacen	C1 team	3rd
2021	U23 World	(Slovenia) Tacen	C1	1st
2021	European	(Italy) Ivrea	C1 team	10th
2021	European	(Italy) Ivrea	C1	5th
2021	World	(Slovakia) Bratislava	C1 team	1st
2021	World	(Slovakia) Bratislava	C1	4th

== Awards and honours ==
Orders

- Knight of the Legion of Honour: 2024
