= 2023 ICF Canoe Slalom World Championships =

Canoe slalom event in London

2023 World Championships
- Venue: Lee Valley White Water Centre
- Location: London, United Kingdom
- Dates: 19–24 September

The 2023 ICF Canoe Slalom World Championships took place from 19 to 24 September 2023 in London, United Kingdom under the auspices of International Canoe Federation (ICF). It was the 43rd edition and the events were held at the Lee Valley White Water Centre, the site of the 2012 Summer Olympics. London hosted the championships for the second time after previously hosting in 2015.

The championships were also the only global qualification event for the 2024 Summer Olympics in Paris. 302 athletes from 58 countries competed for 15 quota spots in K1 events and 12 spots in C1 events.

== Schedule ==
Ten medal events were contested.

All times listed are UTC+1.

Date	Starting time	Events
19 September	10:30	C1W teams
19 September	11:02	C1M teams
19 September	11:47	K1W teams
19 September	12:30	K1M teams
20 September	10:30	C1W heats – 1st run
20 September	11:30	C1M heats – 1st run
20 September	14:00	C1W heats – 2nd run
20 September	14:39	C1M heats – 2nd run
21 September	09:00	K1W heats – 1st run
21 September	10:21	K1M heats – 1st run
21 September	13:30	K1W heats – 2nd run
21 September	14:31	K1M heats – 2nd run
22 September	10:03	C1W semifinals
22 September	11:08	C1M semifinals
22 September	13:35	C1W final
22 September	14:12	C1M final

Date	Starting time	Events
23 September	10:03	K1W semifinals
23 September	11:08	K1M semifinals
23 September	13:35	K1W final
23 September	14:12	K1M final
24 September	09:00	Women's kayak cross time trial
24 September	09:53	Men's kayak cross time trial
24 September	11:55	Women's kayak cross heats
24 September	12:19	Men's kayak cross heats
24 September	13:34	Women's kayak cross quarterfinals
24 September	13:53	Men's kayak cross quarterfinals
24 September	14:11	Women's kayak cross semifinals
24 September	14:20	Men's kayak cross semifinals
24 September	14:31	Women's kayak cross final
24 September	14:37	Men's kayak cross final

== Medal summary ==
=== Medal table ===
* Host nation (Great Britain)

Rank	Nation	Gold	Silver	Bronze	Total
1	Great Britain*	5	2	1	8
2	Australia	2	0	1	3
3	France	1	4	0	5
4	Czech Republic	1	2	0	3
5	Slovenia	1	0	2	3
6	Slovakia	0	1	0	1
6	Spain	0	1	0	1
8	Italy	0	0	2	2
8	Poland	0	0	2	2
10	Morocco	0	0	1	1
10	Switzerland	0	0	1	1
Totals (11 entries)		10	10	10	30

=== Men ===
==== Canoe ====
Event	Gold		Silver		Bronze	
C1	Benjamin Savšek; Slovenia	97.40	Nicolas Gestin; France	98.58	Paolo Ceccon; Italy	98.90
C1 team	France; Nicolas Gestin; Jules Bernardet; Lucas Roisin	99.17	Great Britain; Adam Burgess; Ryan Westley; James Kettle	99.20	Italy; Roberto Colazingari; Raffaello Ivaldi; Paolo Ceccon	100.31

==== Kayak ====
Event	Gold		Silver		Bronze	
K1	Joseph Clarke; Great Britain	91.32	Jiří Prskavec; Czech Republic	93.26	Mathis Soudi; Morocco	93.91
K1 team	Czech Republic; Jiří Prskavec; Vít Přindiš; Jakub Krejčí	91.76	France; Boris Neveu; Titouan Castryck; Benjamin Renia	92.99	Poland; Mateusz Polaczyk; Michał Pasiut; Dariusz Popiela	95.23
Kayak cross	Joseph Clarke; Great Britain		Boris Neveu; France		Martin Dougoud; Switzerland	

=== Women ===
==== Canoe ====
Event	Gold		Silver		Bronze	
C1	Mallory Franklin; Great Britain	108.05	Kimberley Woods; Great Britain	108.47	Jessica Fox; Australia	108.94
C1 team	Great Britain; Mallory Franklin; Kimberley Woods; Ellis Miller	112.45	Czech Republic; Gabriela Satková; Tereza Fišerová; Tereza Kneblová	114.55	Slovenia; Eva Alina Hočevar; Alja Kozorog; Lea Novak	115.32

==== Kayak ====
Event	Gold		Silver		Bronze	
K1	Jessica Fox; Australia	103.60	Eliška Mintálová; Slovakia	104.73	Klaudia Zwolińska; Poland	105.00
K1 team	Australia; Jessica Fox; Noemie Fox; Kate Eckhardt	108.62	Spain; Maialen Chourraut; Laia Sorribes; Olatz Arregui	108.91	Great Britain; Mallory Franklin; Kimberley Woods; Phoebe Spicer	109.02
Kayak cross	Kimberley Woods; Great Britain		Camille Prigent; France		Eva Terčelj; Slovenia	
