= James Kettle =

British slalom canoeist

Personal information
- Nationality: British
- Born: 19 September 2001 (age 24) London, England

Sport
- Country: Great Britain
- Sport: Canoe slalom
- Event: C1
Medal record
Men's canoe slalom
Representing Great Britain
World Championships
Silver medal – second place	2023 London	C1 team
European Games
Bronze medal – third place	2023 Kraków	C1 team
U23 World Championships
Silver medal – second place	2023 Kraków	C1 team
U23 European Championships
Gold medal – first place	2023 Bratislava	C1 team
Silver medal – second place	2022 České Budějovice	C1 team
Junior World Championships
Bronze medal – third place	2019 Kraków	C1 team

James Kettle (born 19 September 2001) is a British slalom canoeist athlete who has competed internationally since 2019.

He won a silver medal in the C1 team event at the 2023 World Championships in London. He also won a bronze medal in the same event at the 2023 European Games in Kraków.
