= Raffaello Ivaldi =

Italian slalom canoeist (born 1997)

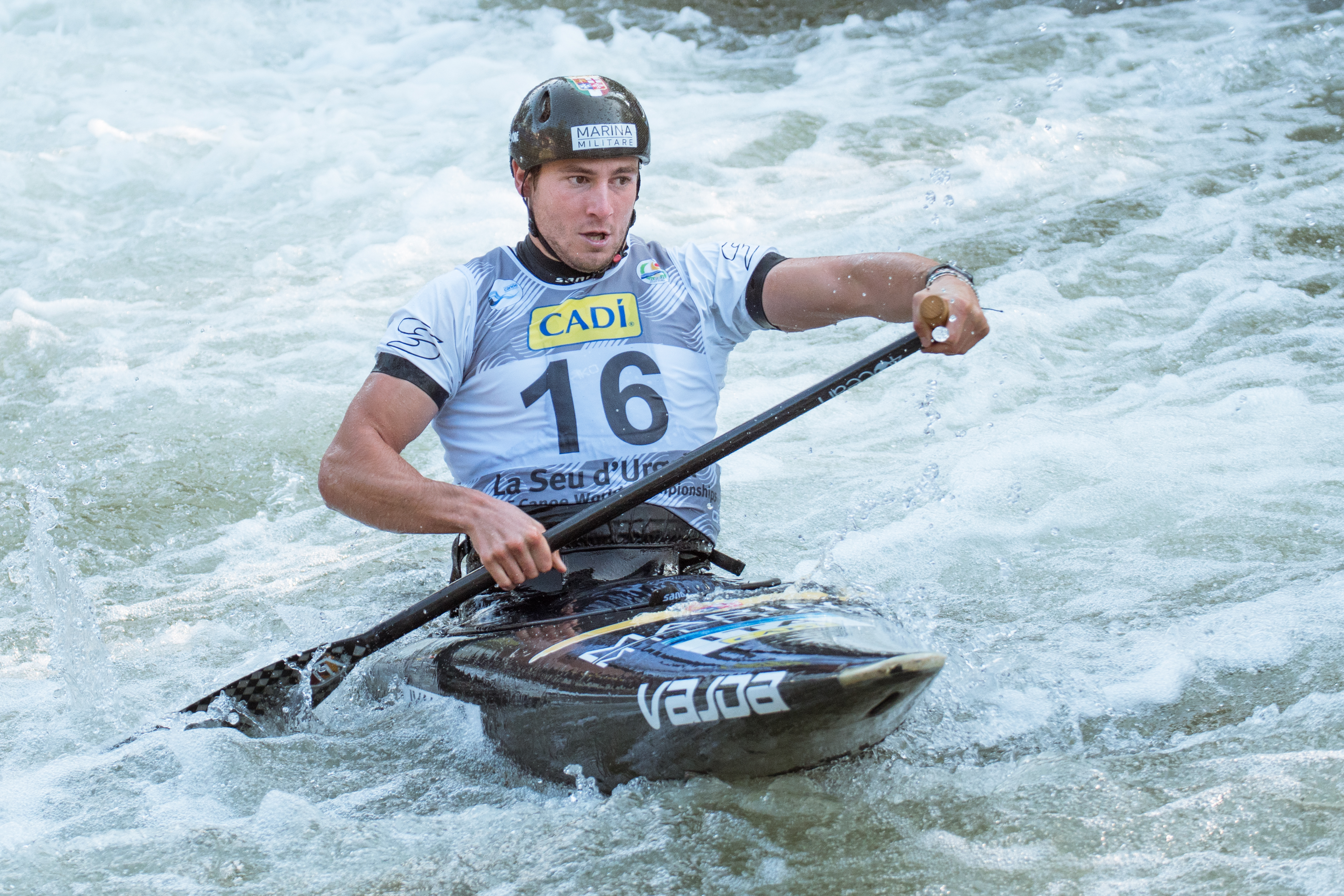

Personal information
- Nationality: Italian
- Born: 16 December 1997 (age 28)

Sport
- Country: Italy
- Sport: Canoe slalom
- Event: C1
- Club: Marina Militare
Medal record
Men's canoe slalom
Representing Italy
World Championships
Bronze medal – third place	2022 Augsburg	C1 team
Bronze medal – third place	2023 London	C1 team
European Championships
Silver medal – second place	2021 Ivrea	C1 team
Bronze medal – third place	2017 Tacen	C1 team
Bronze medal – third place	2026 Ivrea	C1 team
U23 World Championships
Gold medal – first place	2015 Foz do Iguaçu	C1 team
Gold medal – first place	2019 Kraków	C1 team
Silver medal – second place	2018 Ivrea	C1
U23 European Championships
Gold medal – first place	2019 Liptovský Mikuláš	C1 team
Silver medal – second place	2015 Kraków	C1 team
Junior European Championships
Gold medal – first place	2014 Skopje	C1

Raffaello Ivaldi (16 December 1997) is an Italian slalom canoeist who has competed at the international level since 2012. He trains in Ivrea, Italy and is studying law at the University of Verona.

Ivaldi won two bronze medals in the C1 team event at the ICF Canoe Slalom World Championships, earning them in 2022 and 2023. He won one silver and two bronze medals in the C1 team event at the European Championships.

He also won three medals at the ICF World Junior and U23 Canoe Slalom Championships, with two golds in C1 team (2019, 2015) and one silver in C1 (2018).

He competed at the 2024 Summer Olympics in Paris, finishing 14th in the C1 event.

Ivaldi won back-to-back World Cups in La Seu D'Urgell and Vaires-sur-Marne at the end of 2023 to clinch third in the overall standings.

His brother Zeno Ivaldi is also a slalom canoeist, as was his father Ettore Ivaldi.

== Results ==
=== World Cup individual podiums ===
Season	Date	Venue	Position	Event
2017	18 June 2017	Prague	3rd	C1
2023	1 September 2023	La Seu d'Urgell	1st	C1
2023	6 October 2023	Vaires-sur-Marne	1st	C1
2024	14 September 2024	Ivrea	3rd	C1
2026	13 June 2026	Augsburg	1st	C1

=== Complete World Cup results ===
Year	WC1	WC2	WC3	WC4	WC5	Points	Position
2013	Cardiff (United Kingdom)	Augsburg (Germany)	La Seu (Spain); 45	Tacen (Slovenia); 41	Bratislava (Slovakia); 43	6	55th
2014	Lee Valley (United Kingdom)	Tacen (Slovenia)	Prague (Czech Republic); 44	La Seu (Spain)	Augsburg (Germany)	2	83rd
2015	Prague (Czech Republic); 37	Kraków (Poland); 36	Liptovský Mikuláš (Slovakia); 40	La Seu (Spain)	Pau (France)	6	70th
2016	Ivrea (Italy)	La Seu (Spain)	Pau (France)	Prague (Czech Republic); 23	Tacen (Slovenia); 25	53	35th
2017	Prague (Czech Republic); 3	Augsburg (Germany); 35	Markkleeberg (Germany); 51	Ivrea (Italy); 10	La Seu (Spain); 27	110	21st
2018	Liptovský Mikuláš (Slovakia); 27	Kraków (Poland)	Augsburg (Germany)	Tacen (Slovenia)	La Seu (Spain); 16	65	28th
2019	Lee Valley (United Kingdom); 9	Bratislava (Slovakia)	Tacen (Slovenia); 16	Markkleeberg (Germany); 8	Prague (Czech Republic); 51	105	21st
2021	Prague (Czech Republic); 11	Markkleeberg (Germany); 15	La Seu (Spain)	Pau (France); 25		90	21st
2022	Prague (Czech Republic); 25	Kraków (Poland); 9	Tacen (Slovenia); 7	Pau (France); 14	La Seu (Spain); 8	196	7th
2023	Augsburg (Germany); 17	Prague (Czech Republic); 4	Tacen (Slovenia); 30	La Seu (Spain); 1	Paris (France); 1	257	3rd
