= Lucas Roisin =

French slalom canoeist

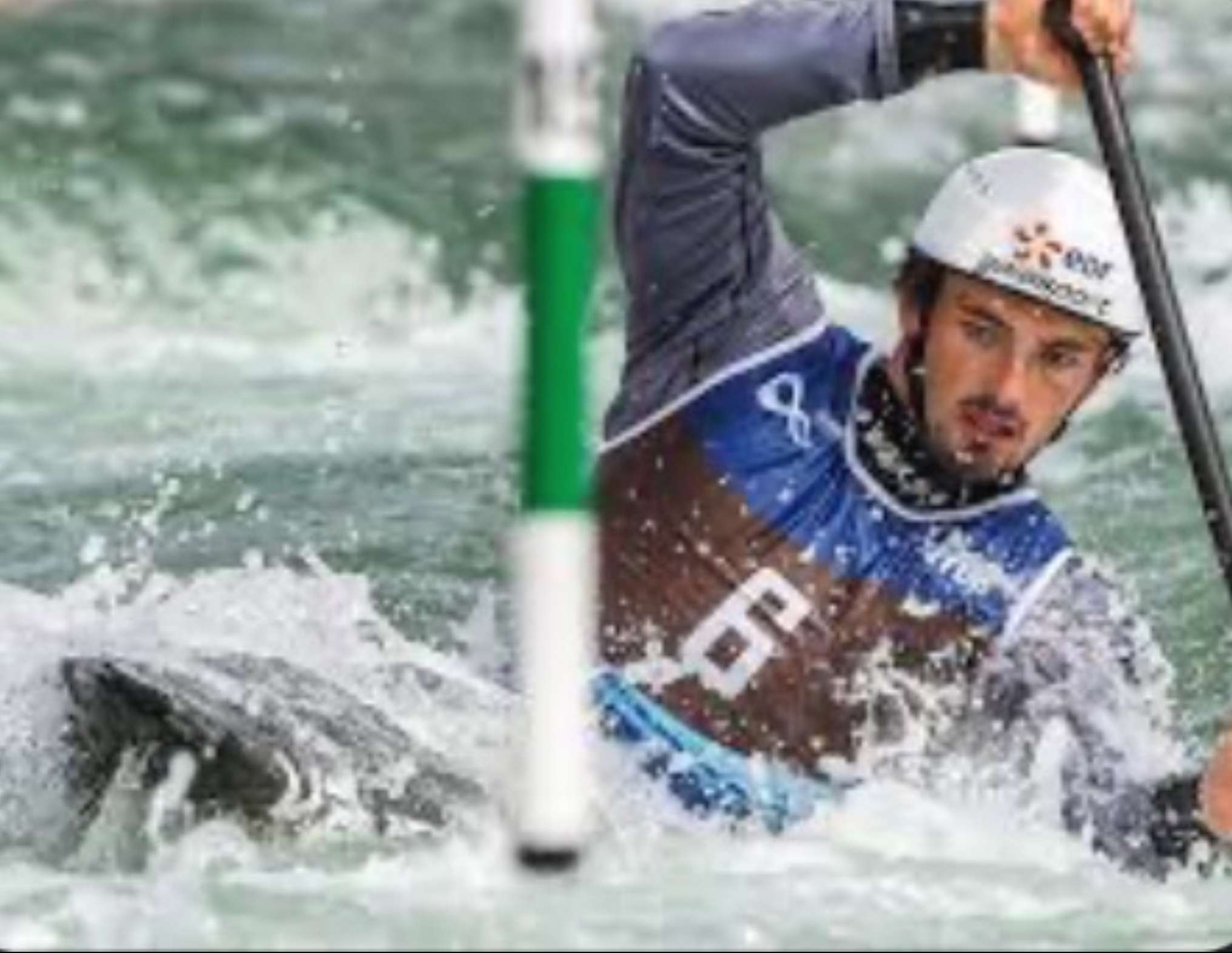

Personal information
- Nationality: French
- Born: 24 March 1997 (age 29)

Sport
- Country: France
- Sport: Canoe slalom
- Event: C1, C2
Medal record
Men's canoe slalom
Representing France
World Championships
| Gold medal – first place | 2023 London | C1 team |
Youth Olympic Games
| Gold medal – first place | 2014 Nanjing | C1 |
U23 World Championships
| Silver medal – second place | 2018 Ivrea | C1 team |
| Silver medal – second place | 2019 Kraków | C1 |
| Bronze medal – third place | 2017 Bratislava | C1 team |
U23 European Championships
| Gold medal – first place | 2014 Skopje | C2 team |
| Gold medal – first place | 2017 Hohenlimburg | C1 team |
| Bronze medal – third place | 2018 Bratislava | C1 team |
| Bronze medal – third place | 2019 Liptovský Mikuláš | C1 |
Junior World Championships
| Gold medal – first place | 2015 Foz do Iguaçu | C2 |
Junior European Championships
| Gold medal – first place | 2014 Skopje | C2 |
| Gold medal – first place | 2015 Kraków | C1 team |

Lucas Roisin (born 24 March 1997) is a French slalom canoeist who has competed at the international level since 2014.

He won a gold medal in the C1 team event at the 2023 World Championships in London.
