= Adam Burgess =

British slalom canoeist (born 1992)

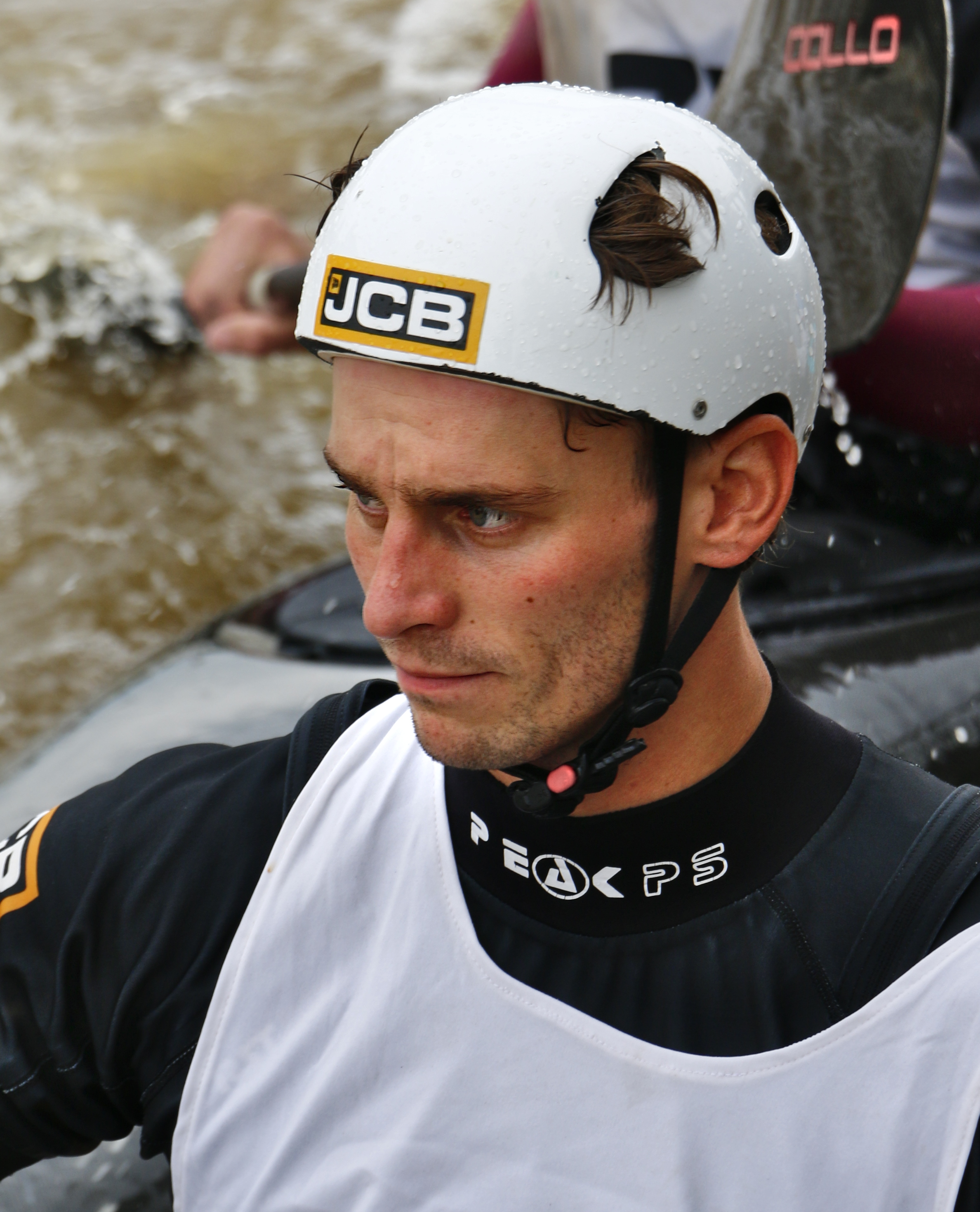
- Burgess in 2024

Personal information
- Full name: Adam James Burgess
- Nationality: British
- Born: 17 July 1992 (age 34) Stoke-on-Trent, England
- Education: Nottingham Trent University
- Height: 1.80 m (5 ft 11 in)
- Weight: 70 kg (154 lb)

Sport
- Country: Great Britain
- Sport: Canoe slalom
- Event: C1, C2
- Club: Stafford & Stone Canoe Club
Medal record
Men's Canoe slalom
Representing Great Britain
Olympic Games
Silver medal – second place	2024 Paris	C1
World Championships
Gold medal – first place	2026 Oklahoma City	C1 team
Silver medal – second place	2017 Pau	C1 team
Silver medal – second place	2023 London	C1 team
Silver medal – second place	2025 Penrith	C1 team
Silver medal – second place	2026 Oklahoma City	C1
Bronze medal – third place	2013 Prague	C2 team
Bronze medal – third place	2015 London	C2 team
Bronze medal – third place	2018 Rio de Janeiro	C1 team
European Games
Bronze medal – third place	2023 Kraków	C1 team
European Championships
Gold medal – first place	2012 Augsburg	C2 team
Gold medal – first place	2025 Vaires-sur-Marne	C1 team
Silver medal – second place	2018 Prague	C1
Bronze medal – third place	2015 Markkleeberg	C1 team
Bronze medal – third place	2016 Liptovský Mikuláš	C1 team
U23 World Championships
Gold medal – first place	2015 Foz do Iguaçu	C1
Silver medal – second place	2012 Wausau	C2 team
Silver medal – second place	2015 Foz do Iguaçu	C1 team
U23 European Championships
Silver medal – second place	2011 Banja Luka	C1 team
Bronze medal – third place	2011 Banja Luka	C2 team
Bronze medal – third place	2012 Solkan	C2 team
Junior World Championships
Gold medal – first place	2010 Foix	C1 team

Adam James Burgess (born 17 July 1992) is a British slalom canoeist who has competed at the international level since 2008.

He won a silver medal in the C1 event at the 2024 Summer Olympics in Paris.

== Career ==
Burgess won eight medals at the ICF Canoe Slalom World Championships with one gold (C1 team: 2026), four silvers (C1: 2026; C1 team: 2017, 2023, 2025) and three bronzes (C1 team: 2018, C2 team: 2013, 2015).

He also won six medals at the European Championships (2 golds, 1 silver and 3 bronzes), including a bronze in the C1 team event at the 2023 European Games in Kraków. He is the 2015 U23 World Champion in C1.

His partner in the C2 boat from 2010 to 2015 was Greg Pitt.

He represented Great Britain at the 2020 Summer Olympics in the C1 event, finishing in 4th place just 0.16 seconds off bronze. Representing Great Britain at the 2024 Paris Olympics he won the silver medal in the C1 event and finished 31st in kayak cross.

== Results ==
=== World Cup individual podiums ===
Season	Date	Venue	Position	Event
2017	2 July 2017	Markkleeberg	3rd	C1
2019	15 June 2019	Lee Valley	2nd	C1
2022	19 June 2022	Kraków	3rd	C1
2025	7 June 2025	La Seu d'Urgell	2nd	C1
2026	6 June 2026	Prague	3rd	C1
2026	13 June 2026	Augsburg	2nd	C1

=== Complete World Cup results ===
Year	Class	WC1	WC2	WC3	WC4	WC5	Points	Position
2011	C1	Tacen (Slovenia)	L'Argentière (France); 24	Markkleeberg (Germany)	Prague (Czech Republic)		17	48th
2011	C2	21	14	Markkleeberg (Germany)	18		28	24th
2012	C1	Cardiff (United Kingdom)	Pau (France); 36	La Seu (Spain)	Prague (Czech Republic); 4	Bratislava (Slovakia)	48	30th
2012	C2	20	20	La Seu (Spain)	7	Bratislava (Slovakia)	87	21st
2013	C2	Cardiff (United Kingdom); 10	Augsburg (Germany)	La Seu (Spain)	Tacen (Slovenia)	Bratislava (Slovakia)	27	26th
2014	C1	Lee Valley (United Kingdom)	Tacen (Slovenia)	Prague (Czech Republic); 34	La Seu (Spain); 21	Augsburg (Germany)	24	45th
2014	C2	19	Tacen (Slovenia)	12	14	12	87	13th
2015	C1	Prague (Czech Republic); 20	Kraków (Poland)	Liptovský Mikuláš (Slovakia); 30	La Seu (Spain); 20	Pau (France); 15	107	19th
2015	C2	25	Kraków (Poland)		23	25	6	37th
2016	C1	Ivrea (Italy); 16	La Seu (Spain); 9	Pau (France); 6	Prague (Czech Republic); 5	Tacen (Slovenia); 4	241	3rd
2017	C1	Prague (Czech Republic); 59	Augsburg (Germany); 24	Markkleeberg (Germany); 3	Ivrea (Italy)	La Seu (Spain); 29	83	29th
2018	C1	Liptovský Mikuláš (Slovakia); 30	Kraków (Poland); 8	Augsburg (Germany); 7	Tacen (Slovenia)	La Seu (Spain); 15	139	13th
2019	C1	Lee Valley (United Kingdom); 2	Bratislava (Slovakia)	Tacen (Slovenia)	Markkleeberg (Germany)	Prague (Czech Republic); 15	139	11th
2021	C1	Prague (Czech Republic); 9	Markkleeberg (Germany); 37	La Seu (Spain); 19	Pau (France)		62*	18th*

* Season still in progress.
