= Paolo Ceccon =

Italian slalom canoeist (born 1996)

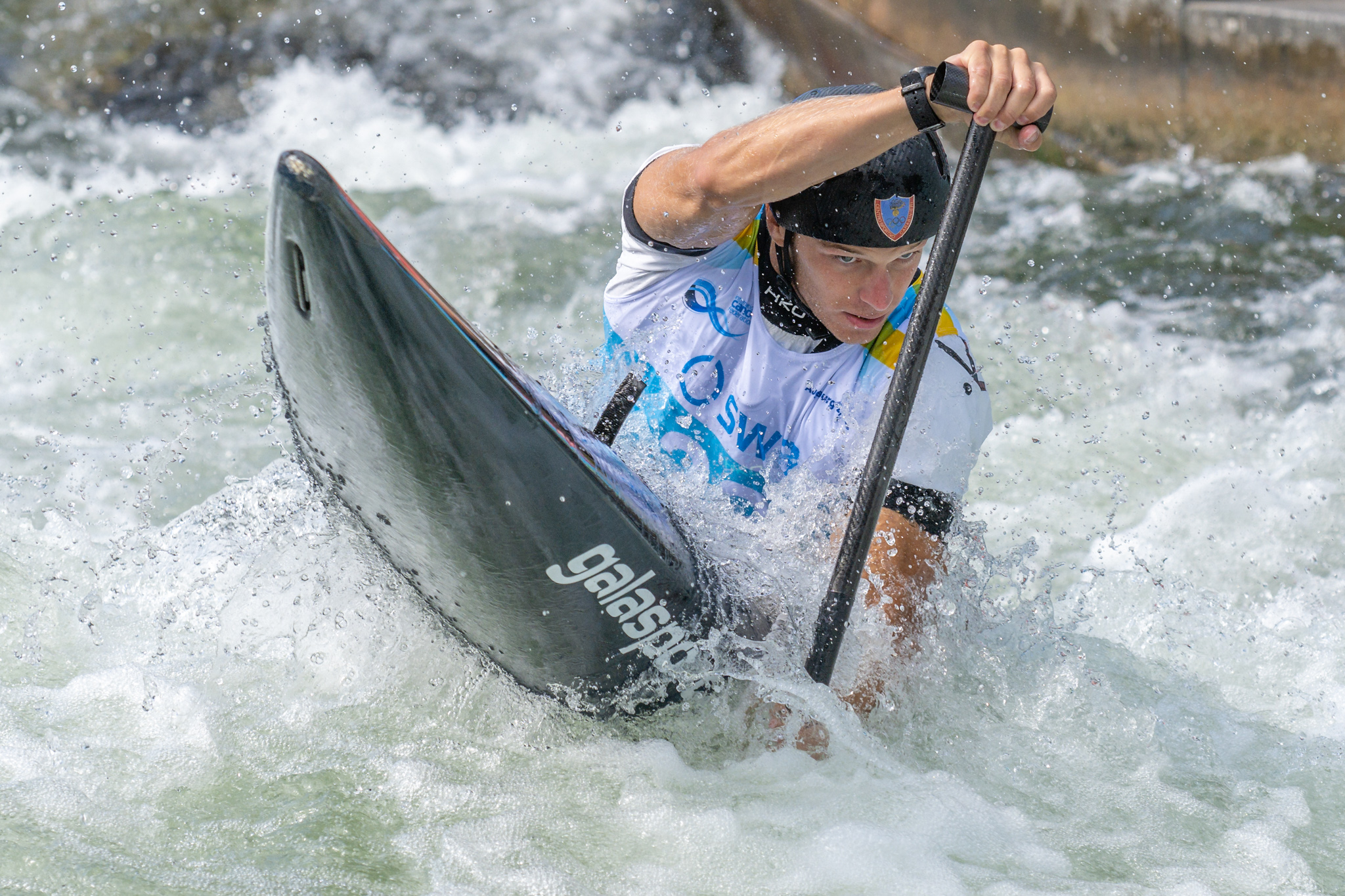
- Paolo Ceccon in 2022

Personal information
- Nationality: Italian
- Born: 13 September 1996 (age 29)
- Height: 180 cm (5 ft 11 in)
- Weight: 70 kg (154 lb)

Sport
- Country: Italy
- Sport: Canoe slalom
- Event: C1
Medal record
Men's canoe slalom
Representing Italy
World Championships
Bronze medal – third place	2022 Augsburg	C1 team
Bronze medal – third place	2023 London	C1
Bronze medal – third place	2023 London	C1 team
U23 World Championships
Gold medal – first place	2015 Foz do Iguaçu	C1 team
Gold medal – first place	2019 Kraków	C1 team
Silver medal – second place	2015 Foz do Iguaçu	C1
U23 European Championships
Gold medal – first place	2019 Liptovský Mikuláš	C1 team
Silver medal – second place	2015 Kraków	C1 team

Paolo Ceccon (born 13 September 1996) is an Italian slalom canoeist who has competed at the international level since 2011.

He won three bronze medals at the ICF Canoe Slalom World Championships, one in the C1 event (2023) and two in the C1 team event (2022 and 2023).
