= Franz Anton =

German slalom canoeist (born 1989)

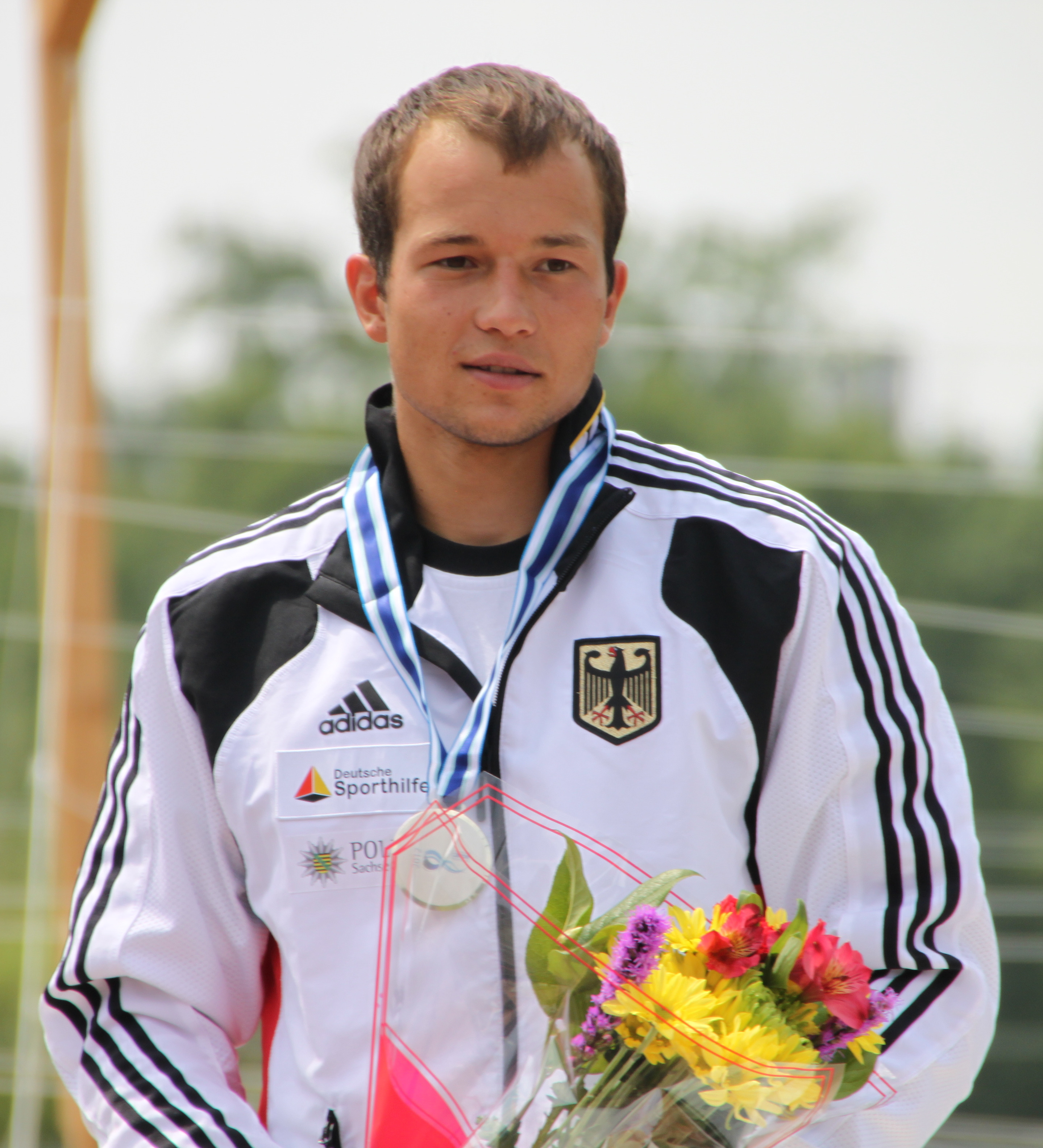
- Anton at the 2012 U23 World Championships

Personal information
- Nationality: German
- Born: 23 October 1989 (age 36) Lutherstadt Wittenberg, East Germany
- Height: 173 cm (5 ft 8 in)
- Weight: 70 kg (154 lb)

Sport
- Country: Germany
- Sport: Canoe slalom
- Event: C1, C2
- Club: LKC Leipziger
- Coached by: Michael Trummer (national); Frithjof Bergner (personal)
Medal record
Representing Germany
World Championships
Gold medal – first place	2015 London	C2
Gold medal – first place	2018 Rio de Janeiro	C1
Silver medal – second place	2010 Tacen	C1 team
Silver medal – second place	2013 Prague	C1 team
Silver medal – second place	2015 London	C1 team
Silver medal – second place	2015 London	C2 team
Bronze medal – third place	2014 Deep Creek Lake	C1
Bronze medal – third place	2021 Bratislava	C1
Bronze medal – third place	2022 Augsburg	C1
European Games
Gold medal – first place	2023 Kraków	C1 team
European Championships
Gold medal – first place	2017 Tacen	C1 team
Gold medal – first place	2018 Prague	C2 team
Gold medal – first place	2022 Liptovský Mikuláš	C1 team
Silver medal – second place	2013 Kraków	C1 team
Silver medal – second place	2015 Markkleeberg	C2
Bronze medal – third place	2013 Kraków	C2 team
Bronze medal – third place	2016 Liptovský Mikuláš	C2 team
U23 World Championships
Silver medal – second place	2012 Wausau	C1
U23 European Championships
Gold medal – first place	2010 Markkleeberg	C1 team
Bronze medal – third place	2011 Banja Luka	C1 team
Junior European Championships
Gold medal – first place	2007 Kraków	C1 team

Franz Anton (born 23 October 1989) is a German slalom canoeist who has competed at the international level since 2006. He specialized in the C1 class from the start of his career. Between 2012 and 2018 he was also competing in the C2 class together with Jan Benzien.

He won nine medals at the ICF Canoe Slalom World Championships with two golds (C1: 2018, C2: 2015), four silvers (C1 team: 2010, 2013, 2015; C2 team: 2015), and three bronzes (C1: 2014, 2021, 2022). He also won eight medals at the European Championships (4 golds, 2 silvers and 2 bronzes), including a gold in the C1 team event at the 2023 European Games in Kraków.

At the 2016 Summer Olympics, he placed 4th in the C2 event, together with teammate Jan Benzien.

Anton took up canoeing aged nine at the Meissner Canoe Club, together with his brother Albrecht, who is also a slalom canoeist. He works as a police officer and is married to Rebecca Juttner.

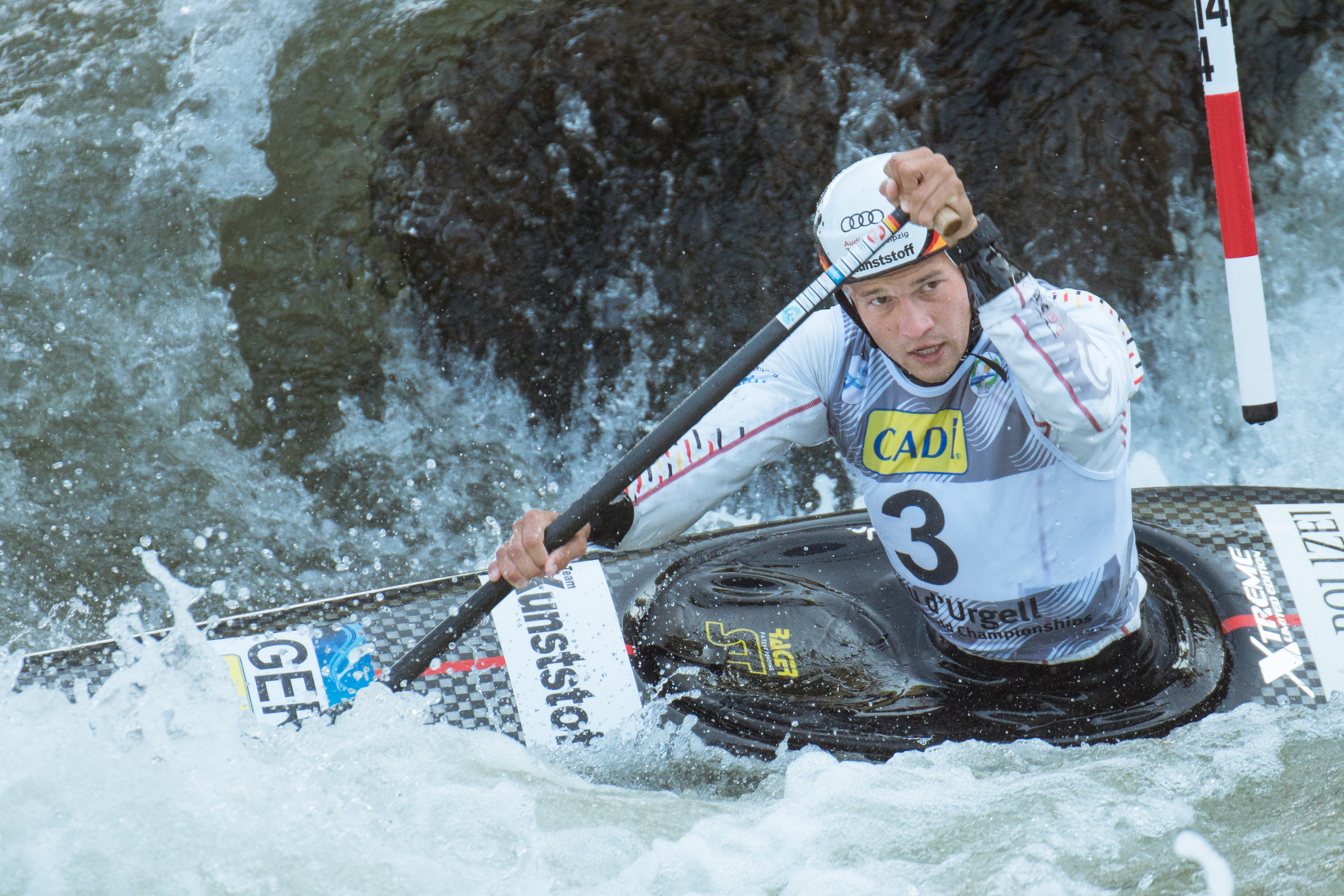
Anton during the 2019 Canoe slalom World Championships

== World Cup individual podiums ==
	1st place, gold medalist(s)	2nd place, silver medalist(s)	3rd place, bronze medalist(s)	Total
C1	1	3	4	8
C2	1	2	0	3
Total	2	5	4	11

Season	Date	Venue	Position	Event
2012	2 September 2012	Bratislava	1st	C2
2013	17 August 2013	Tacen	2nd	C1
2014	8 June 2014	Lee Valley	2nd	C2
2014	17 August 2014	Augsburg	2nd	C2
2017	25 June 2017	Augsburg	3rd	C1
2018	1 September 2018	Tacen	3rd	C1
2018	8 September 2018	La Seu d'Urgell	2nd	C1
2019	22 June 2019	Bratislava	1st	C1
2019	31 August 2019	Markkleeberg	3rd	C1
2021	5 September 2021	La Seu d'Urgell	3rd	C1
2023	6 October 2023	Vaires-sur-Marne	2nd	C1
