= Luis Fernández (canoeist) =

Spanish canoeist

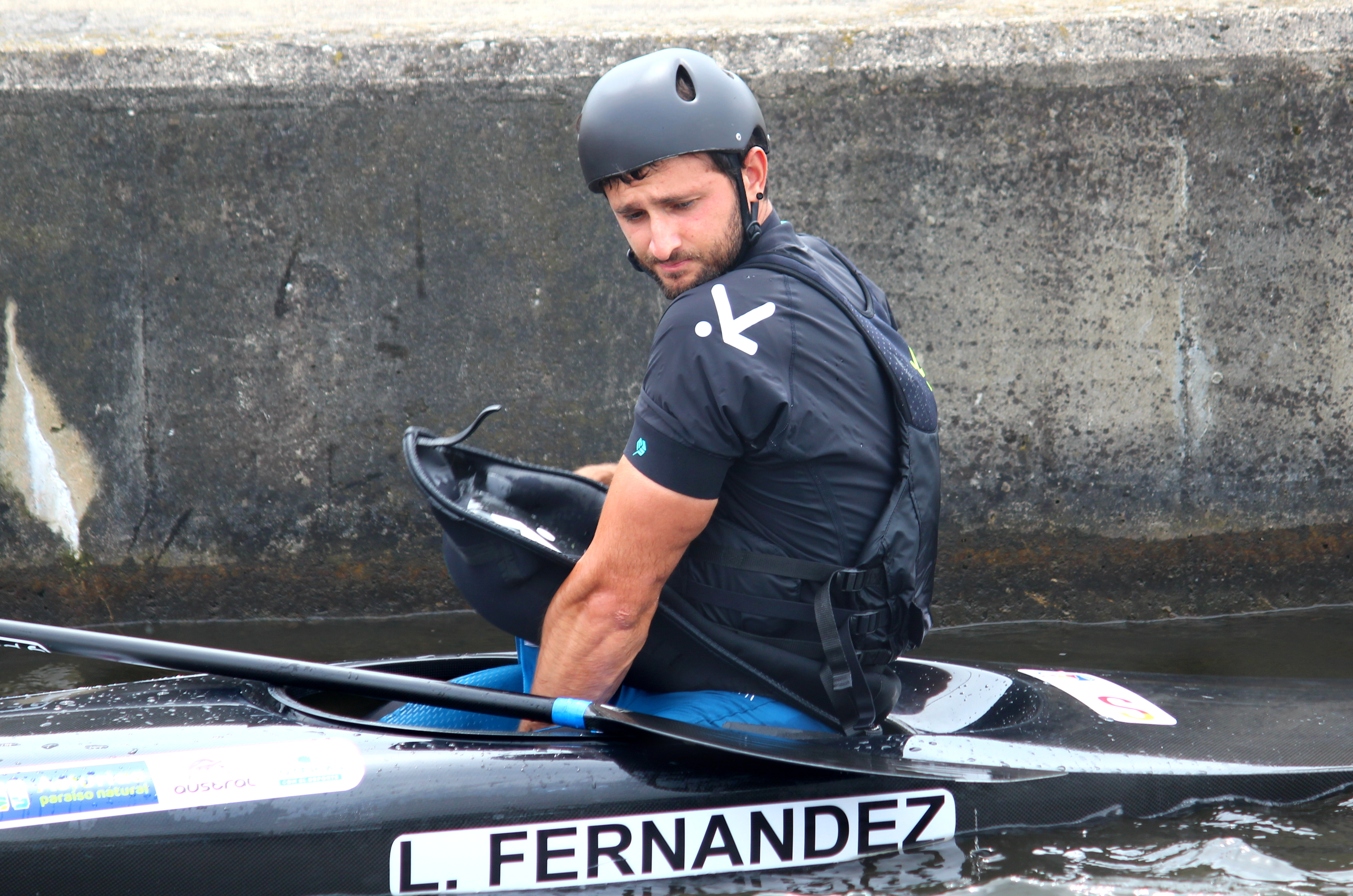

Personal information
- Nationality: Spanish
- Born: 20 January 1997 (age 29)

Sport
- Country: Spain
- Sport: Canoe slalom
- Event: C1
Medal record
Men's canoe slalom
Representing Spain
World Championships
Silver medal – second place	2019 La Seu d'Urgell	C1 team
European Championships
Bronze medal – third place	2022 Liptovský Mikuláš	C1 team
Junior World Championships
Bronze medal – third place	2014 Penrith	C1 team

Luis Fernández (born 20 January 1997) is a Spanish slalom canoeist who has competed at the international level since 2014.

He won a silver medal in the C1 team event at the 2019 ICF Canoe Slalom World Championships in La Seu d'Urgell. He also won a bronze medal in the same event at the 2022 European Championships in Liptovský Mikuláš.
