= Pau-Pyrénées Whitewater Stadium =

Artificial whitewater course in Pau, France

Coordinates: 43.286°N 0.358°W

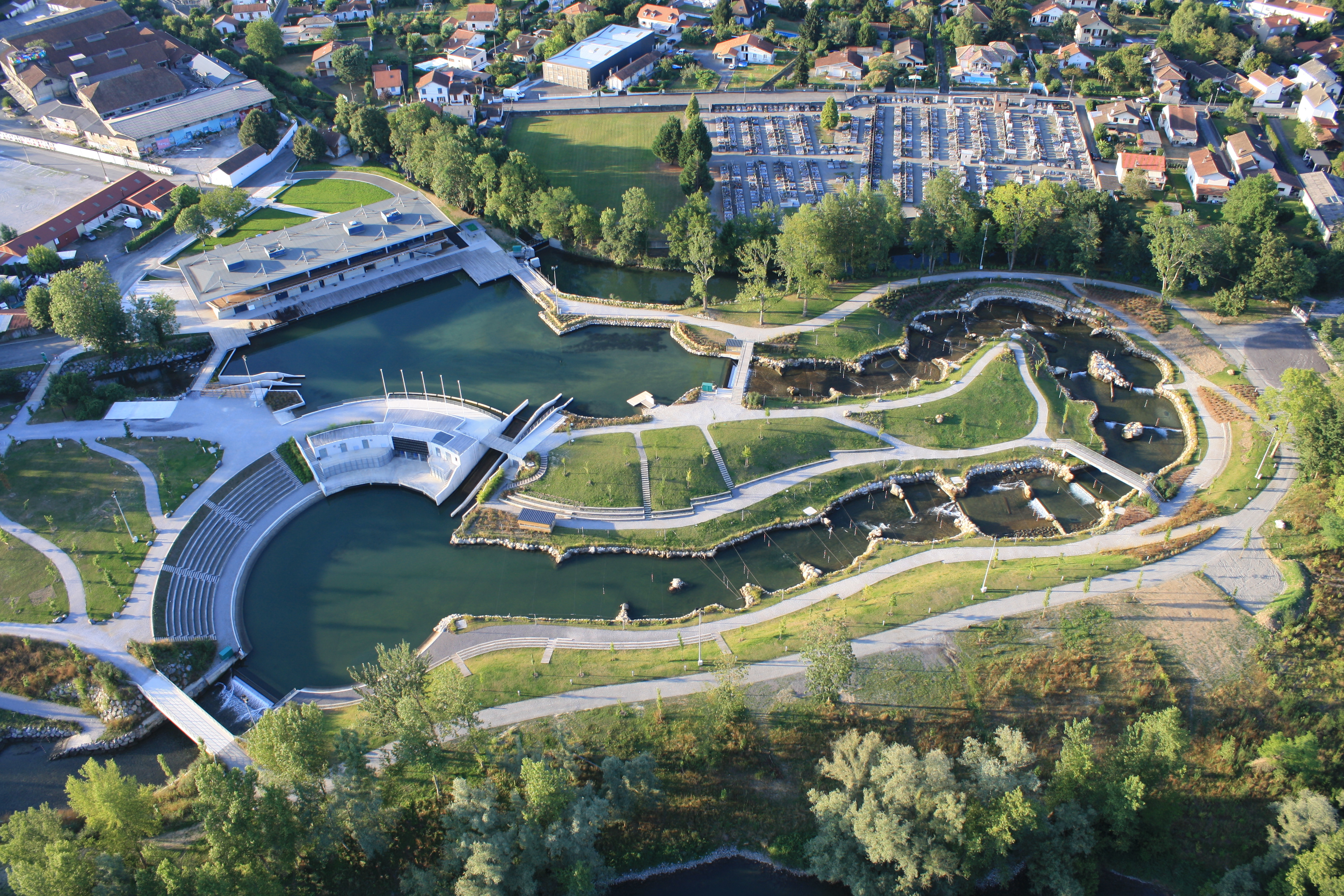

About
- Locale: Pau, France
- Managing agent: Communauté d'agglomération de Pau-Pyrénées
- Main shape: Loop
- Water source: Gave de Pau
- Pumped: Competition course only: supplemental pumping up to 10.5 m^{3}/s (370 cu ft/s)
- Flow diversion: From Gave de Pau
- Practice pool: Yes
- Canoe lift: yes
- Construction: 2006 - 2008
- Opening date: April 2008

Stats
- Length: Competition: 300 metres (984 ft) Training: 200 metres (656 ft)
- Drop: Competition: 5.0 metres (16 ft) Training: 2.0 metres (7 ft)
- Slope: Competition: 1.7% (88 ft/mi) Training: 1.0% (53 ft/mi)
- Flowrate: 15 m^{3}/s (530 cu ft/s)

Pau-Pyrénées Whitewater Stadium (French: Stade d'eaux-vives Pau-Pyrénées) is the home training facility for the French national canoe slalom team. It was first used to train the French team for the 2008 Summer Olympics in Beijing. It 2009, it was the first of three venues used in the canoe slalom World Cup. It is also a whitewater park for recreational use by the general public.

== History and design ==
Map of the stadium

The town of Pau has long been a center of activity for French canoe slalom. The natural rapids in the center of town are still equipped with hanging slalom gates. But the sport is increasingly conducted on artificial whitewater, and the presence in Pau of two Olympic medalists, Tony Estanguet and his older brother Patrice, helped to make Pau the site of this new 11.7 million € facility.

It is located beside a small dam upstream from town, where it uses diverted river water supplemented by pumped recirculation when the river's streamflow is low. The artificial channels are lined with boulders embedded in concrete, and the visible instream flow diverters are natural rocks, giving the course a natural appearance, similar to that of the nearby Parc Olímpic del Segre on the Spanish side of the mountains. The moveable plastic bollards common to many such courses are not used here.

== 2009 & 2012 World Cup ==
Stadium layout for the 2009 (top) and 2012 (bottom) World Cups

External videos
- Tony Estanguet racing through the course during the 2012 World Cup

For the July 2009 World Cup race, there were 14 downstream gates and 6 upstream gates. Most of the racers backed through downstream gates #3 and #16 in order to set up for upstream gates #4 and #17. For the 2012 race, there were 25 gates for the semi-finals and finals. For the heats, with only 18 gates, the six upstream gates were in the same spots but with lower numbers: 4, 6, 10, 12, 14, & 18. In two places, a barrier was added connecting an island to the right bank and sending all flow around the left side of the island.
