= 2026 ICF Canoe Slalom World Championships – Men's C1 =

Men's canoe at the 2026 ICF Canoe Slalom World Championships
- Venue: RIVERSPORT OKC
- Location: Oklahoma City, United States
- Dates: 22–24 July 2026
- Competitors: 70 from 32 nations

Medalists
gold medal	Miquel Travé	Spain
silver medal	Adam Burgess	Great Britain
bronze medal	Lukáš Kratochvíl	Czech Republic

The men's canoe event at the 2026 ICF Canoe Slalom World Championships took place on 24 July 2026 at the RIVERSPORT OKC in Oklahoma City, with the qualification heats on 22 July 2026.

== Competition format ==
The event uses a three-round format with qualification heats, semifinal and final. The top 30 paddlers from the single qualification run qualify for the semifinal. Paddlers start in the reverse order of their qualification position in the semifinal and complete a single run, with the top 12 advancing to the final. The start list for the final is once again in reverse order of the semifinal results. The athlete with the best time in the single-run final is awarded gold.

A penalty of 2 seconds is awarded for touching a gate and a 50-second penalty is awarded for missing a gate or negotiating it in the opposite direction.

The qualification course had 22 gates including 6 upstream gates (5-7-11-14-17-20). The semifinal and final course also had 22 gates with 6 upstream gates (5-7-11-14-17-22).

== Schedule ==
All times listed are UTC–5.

Date	Time	Round
22 July 2026
22 July 2026	10:06	Heats
24 July 2026
24 July 2026	10:06	Semifinal
24 July 2026	14:06	Final

== Results ==
Penalties are included in the time shown. The fastest time in each round is shown in bold.

Rank	Bib	Canoeist	Nation	Heats			Semifinal			Final		
Rank	Bib	Canoeist	Nation	Time	Pen	Rank	Time	Pen	Rank	Time	Pen	Rank
1st place, gold medalist(s)	3	Miquel Travé	Spain	85.24	0	5	93.19	2	10	**88.28**	0	1
2nd place, silver medalist(s)	7	Adam Burgess	Great Britain	85.16	0	4	91.65	0	3	89.77	0	2
3rd place, bronze medalist(s)	17	Lukáš Kratochvíl	Czech Republic	84.60	0	2	92.73	2	7	89.89	0	3
4	14	Marko Mirgorodský	Slovakia	84.92	0	3	91.03	0	2	90.42	0	4
5	15	Flavio Micozzi	Italy	89.08	0	16	93.62	2	12	91.36	0	5
6	1	Nicolas Gestin	France	**84.01**	0	1	93.03	2	9	92.60	4	6
7	8	Raffaello Ivaldi	Italy	89.12	0	17	92.23	0	6	93.18	0	7
8	23	Sideris Tasiadis	Germany	88.79	0	13	91.86	0	4	93.28	0	8
9	6	Ryan Westley	Great Britain	89.64	0	19	**90.58**	0	1	94.25	4	9
10	21	Lennard Tuchscherer	Germany	87.18	0	8	92.12	0	5	95.43	2	10
11	2	Yohann Senechault	France	86.08	2	7	93.19	2	10	96.92	4	11
12	11	Benjamin Savšek	Slovenia	91.02	4	29	92.74	0	8	145.64	52	12
13	25	Dmitrii Khramtsov	Individual Neutral Athletes	90.74	2	26	93.96	0	13	Did not advance		
14	9	Matej Beňuš	Slovakia	85.71	0	6	94.29	2	14	Did not advance		
15	24	Matija Marinić	Croatia	87.85	2	11	94.71	0	15	Did not advance		
16	29	Szymon Nowobilski	Poland	90.02	0	21	94.91	0	16	Did not advance		
17	33	Casey Eichfeld	United States	90.22	2	23	95.07	4	17	Did not advance		
18	4	Luka Božič	Slovenia	89.48	2	18	95.11	0	18	Did not advance		
19	45	Zhang Peng	China	90.65	0	24	95.42	4	19	Did not advance		
20	31	Alex Baldoni	Canada	90.97	0	28	95.56	0	20	Did not advance		
21	43	Kauã da Silva	Brazil	90.66	2	25	95.63	0	21	Did not advance		
22	34	Peter Linksted	Great Britain	90.05	2	22	96.18	0	22	Did not advance		
23	40	Yves Bourhis	Senegal	87.76	0	10	96.56	2	23	Did not advance		
24	41	Zachary Lokken	United States	90.78	2	27	96.68	2	24	Did not advance		
25	12	Václav Chaloupka	Czech Republic	91.44	4	30	96.94	0	25	Did not advance		
26	39	Manuel Trípano	Argentina	88.81	0	14	97.82	0	26	Did not advance		
27	36	Jake Cochrane	Ireland	89.65	0	20	98.95	2	27	Did not advance		
28	35	Lachlan Bassett	Australia	88.53	0	12	99.66	4	28	Did not advance		
29	26	Liam Jegou	Ireland	87.57	0	9	101.13	4	29	Did not advance		
30	57	Ji Junyu	China	88.95	0	15	106.02	6	30	Did not advance		
31	30	Oliver Puchner	New Zealand	91.76	0	31	Did not advance					
32	54	Alexandr Kulikov	Kazakhstan	92.22	0	32	Did not advance					
33	44	Anvar Klevleev	Uzbekistan	92.35	2	33	Did not advance					
34	5	Žiga Lin Hočevar	Slovenia	92.42	4	34	Did not advance					
35	38	Zhang Zhicheng	China	92.63	0	35	Did not advance					
36	37	Aleksandr Kharlamtsev	Individual Neutral Athletes	93.02	0	36	Did not advance					
37	10	Jules Bernardet	France	93.05	0	37	Did not advance					
38	49	Ioannis Zachos	Greece	93.14	0	38	Did not advance					
39	19	Lukáš Rohan	Czech Republic	93.24	0	39	Did not advance					
40	42	Michał Wiercioch	Poland	93.38	2	40	Did not advance					
41	18	Kaylen Bassett	Australia	93.43	2	41	Did not advance					
42	52	Takuya Haneda	Japan	93.81	0	42	Did not advance					
43	68	Manato Nakajima	Japan	93.91	0	43	Did not advance					
44	59	Tyler Gevaert	Canada	94.28	2	44	Did not advance					
45	22	Thomas Koechlin	Switzerland	94.33	2	45	Did not advance					
46	16	Tristan Carter	Australia	94.48	4	46	Did not advance					
47	50	Terence Saramandif	Mauritius	94.59	4	47	Did not advance					
48	48	Finn Anderson	New Zealand	95.16	0	48	Did not advance					
49	56	Petar Habek	Croatia	95.89	2	49	Did not advance					
50	51	Shota Saito	Japan	96.17	0	50	Did not advance					
51	27	Timo Trummer	Germany	96.27	6	51	Did not advance					
52	47	Jean-Pierre Bourhis	Senegal	97.05	2	52	Did not advance					
53	32	Alex Segura	Spain	97.12	4	53	Did not advance					
54	55	Wu Jung-cheng	Chinese Taipei	97.88	0	54	Did not advance					
55	61	Chang Fu-hua	Chinese Taipei	98.11	2	55	Did not advance					
56	62	Geral Soto	Chile	98.22	0	56	Did not advance					
57	20	Oier Díaz	Spain	98.34	2	57	Did not advance					
58	46	James Senior	New Zealand	99.23	8	58	Did not advance					
59	58	Damjan Hohnjec	Croatia	102.31	6	59	Did not advance					
60	53	Nathaniel Francis	United States	102.67	0	60	Did not advance					
61	60	Tseng Hsin-kuang	Chinese Taipei	102.79	0	61	Did not advance					
62	70	Dimitrios Zachos	Greece	105.88	2	62	Did not advance					
63	63	Mustafa Parlak	Turkey	106.56	4	63	Did not advance					
64	66	Martin Thomas	Canada	106.58	4	64	Did not advance					
65	67	Ricardo Fentanes	Mexico	115.41	6	65	Did not advance					
66	13	Kacper Sztuba	Poland	135.61	50	66	Did not advance					
67	28	Dominik Egyházy	Slovakia	143.20	54	67	Did not advance					
68	64	Alexandr Korobov	Kazakhstan	147.00	50	68	Did not advance					
69	69	Lewis Groos	Cook Islands	217.15	104	69	Did not advance					
70	65	Ng Wee Meng	Singapore	240.62	58	70	Did not advance					
