= 2026 ICF Canoe Slalom World Championships – Men's C1 team =

Men's canoe teams at the 2026 ICF Canoe Slalom World Championships
- Venue: RIVERSPORT OKC
- Location: Oklahoma City, Oklahoma, United States
- Dates: 22 July 2026
- Competitors: 48 from 16 nations
- Teams: 16

Medalists
gold medal	Ryan Westley; Adam Burgess; Peter Linksted	Great Britain
silver medal	Nicolas Gestin; Yohann Senechault; Jules Bernardet	France
bronze medal	Lennard Tuchscherer; Timo Trummer; Sideris Tasiadis	Germany

The men's canoe team event at the 2026 ICF Canoe Slalom World Championships took place on 22 July 2026 at RIVERSPORT OKC in Oklahoma City.

== Competition format ==
Team events use a single run format with the team with the fastest time including penalties awarded gold. Teams consist of three paddlers from the same country.

Penalties are accumulated for each athlete, such that a team can incur a total of 150 seconds of penalties on a single gate (if all three miss it) or 6 seconds (if all three touch it). The time begins when the first paddler crosses the start beam and ends when the last one crosses the finish beam. All three paddlers must cross the finish line within 15 seconds of each other or else incur an additional 50-second penalty.

The teams had to navigate a total of 18 gates along the course, including 6 upstream gates (5-7-11-14-17-18).

== Results ==
Rank	Bib	Country	Athletes	Result		
Rank	Bib	Country	Athletes	Time	Pen	Total
1st place, gold medalist(s)	2	Great Britain	Ryan Westley; Adam Burgess; Peter Linksted	93.18	0	93.18
2nd place, silver medalist(s)	1	France	Nicolas Gestin; Yohann Senechault; Jules Bernardet	91.54	2	93.54
3rd place, bronze medalist(s)	16	Germany	Lennard Tuchscherer; Timo Trummer; Sideris Tasiadis	95.60	0	95.60
4	3	Slovenia	Žiga Lin Hočevar; Benjamin Savšek; Luka Božič	94.53	2	96.53
5	6	Czech Republic	Václav Chaloupka; Lukáš Kratochvíl; Lukáš Rohan	96.52	2	98.52
6	8	Poland	Kacper Sztuba; Szymon Nowobilski; Michał Wiercioch	95.48	4	99.48
7	11	China	Zhang Zhicheng; Zhang Peng; Ji Junyu	101.39	0	101.39
8	4	Australia	Kaylen Bassett; Tristan Carter; Lachlan Bassett	100.65	2	102.65
9	7	Slovakia	Matej Beňuš; Marko Mirgorodský; Dominik Egyházy	99.03	4	103.03
10	14	Croatia	Matija Marinić; Damjan Hohnjec; Petar Habek	101.50	2	103.50
11	15	United States	Casey Eichfeld; Zachary Lokken; Nathaniel Francis	100.40	6	106.40
12	13	Chinese Taipei	Wu Jung-cheng; Chang Fu-hua; Tseng Hsin-kuang	112.37	2	114.37
13	12	Japan	Shota Saito; Takuya Haneda; Manato Nakajima	104.77	10	114.77
14	10	New Zealand	Oliver Puchner; Finn Anderson; James Senior	104.58	56	160.58
15	9	Canada	Martin Thomas; Alex Baldoni; Tyler Gevaert	122.29	152	274.29
16	5	Spain	Miquel Travé; Oier Díaz; Alex Segura	DNS		
