= Werro =

Werro is a Swiss surname that may refer to the following notable people:

- Audrey Werro (born 2004), Swiss track and field athlete
- Lukas Werro (born 1991), Swiss slalom canoeist
- Simon Werro (born 1989), Swiss slalom canoeist, brother of Lukas

== See also ==
- Võru, Estonian town that had the German name Werro
