= Anderson Oliveira =

Anderson Oliveira may refer to:

- Anderson Oliveira (canoeist) (born 1992), Brazilian canoeist
- Anderson Oliveira (footballer, born 1998), Brazilian footballer
- Anderson (footballer, born 1988) (Anderson Luís de Abreu Oliveira), Brazilian footballer

== See also ==
- Anderson Oliveira Almeida (born 1980), Brazilian footballer
