= Canoeing at the 2015 Pan American Games – Men's slalom C-1 =

Men's slalom C-1 at the 2015 Pan American Games
- Venue: Minden Wild Water Preserve
- Dates: July 18–19
- Competitors: 8 from 8 nations
- Winning time: 92.80

Medalists
Gold medal	Casey Eichfeld	United States
Silver medal	Cameron Smedley	Canada
Bronze medal	Felipe Borges	Brazil

The men's slalom C-1 canoeing event at the 2015 Pan American Games will be held between the 18th and 19 July at the Minden Wild Water Preserve in Minden Hills. At the Pan American Sports Organization's 2013 general assembly in Jamaica, canoe slalom competitions were added to the program. This will be the first time slalom has been staged at the Pan American Games. Furthermore, women will also compete in canoe races for the first time ever in both disciplines. The winners of the four canoe slalom competitions (besides the C-1 women event, which is not an Olympic event) will qualify for the 2016 Summer Olympics in Rio de Janeiro, Brazil. If the host nation of the Olympics (Brazil) wins the event, the runner up will qualify instead.

== Schedule ==
The following is the competition schedule for the event:

All times are Eastern Daylight Time (UTC−4)

Date	Time	Round
July 18, 2015	10:35	Heat–Run 1
July 18, 2015	12:07	Heat–Run 2
July 19, 2015	10:39	Semi-final
July 19, 2015	13:15	Final

== Results ==
=== Heat ===
Rank	Name	Nation	Run 1			Run 2			Best	Notes
Rank	Name	Nation	Time	Pen.	Total	Time	Pen.	Total	Best	Notes
1	Casey Eichfeld	United States	89.98	0	89.98	85.33	2	87.33	87.33	Q
2	Sebastián Rossi	Argentina	92.02	0	92.02	90.16	0	90.16	90.16	Q
3	Cameron Smedley	Canada	91.90	4	95.90	89.05	2	91.05	91.05	Q
4	Felipe Borges	Brazil	93.30	2	95.30	92.95	2	94.95	94.95	Q
5	Jose Silva	Venezuela	101.05	4	105.05	99.64	2	101.64	101.64	Q
6	Nicolás Sierra	Mexico	156.55	54	210.55	114.62	18	132.62	132.62	Q
7	Andrés Pérez	Colombia	176.31	0	176.31	156.63	60	216.63	176.31	Q
8	Luis Mendez Rojas	Costa Rica			DNF	203.67	10	213.67	213.67	Q

=== Semifinal ===
Rank	Name	Nation	Time	Pen.	Total	Notes
1	Casey Eichfeld	United States	92.84	2	94.84	Q
2	Cameron Smedley	Canada	93.69	8	101.69	Q
3	Sebastián Rossi	Argentina	112.25	8	120.25	Q
4	Felipe Borges	Brazil	117.79	6	123.79	Q
5	Jose Silva	Venezuela	139.83	2	141.83	Q
6	Andrés Pérez	Colombia	134.42	56	190.42	Q
7	Nicolás Sierra	Mexico	148.85	66	214.85	
8	Luis Mendez Rojas	Costa Rica	218.88	56	274.88	

=== Final ===
Rank	Name	Nation	Time	Pen.	Total	Notes
1st place, gold medalist(s)	Casey Eichfeld	United States	92.80	0	92.80	
2nd place, silver medalist(s)	Cameron Smedley	Canada	92.09	2	94.09	
3rd place, bronze medalist(s)	Felipe Borges	Brazil	98.41	0	98.41	
4	Sebastián Rossi	Argentina	93.95	6	99.95	
5	Jose Silva	Venezuela	105.99	6	111.99	
6	Andrés Pérez	Colombia	140.18	56	196.18	
