= Canoeing at the 2015 Pan American Games – Men's slalom C-2 =

Men's slalom C-2 at the 2015 Pan American Games
- Venue: Minden Wild Water Preserve
- Dates: July 18–19
- Competitors: 12 from 6 nations
- Winning time: 106.95

Medalists
Gold medal	Devin McEwan; Casey Eichfeld	United States
Silver medal	Charles Correa; Anderson Oliveira	Brazil
Bronze medal	Lucas Rossi; Sebastián Rossi	Argentina

The men's slalom C-2 canoeing event at the 2015 Pan American Games will be held between the 18 and 19 of July at the Minden Wild Water Preserve in Minden Hills. At the Pan American Sports Organization's 2013 general assembly in Jamaica, canoe slalom competitions were added to the program. This will be the first-time slalom has been staged at the Pan American Games. Furthermore, women will also compete in canoe races for the first time ever in both disciplines. The winners of the four canoe slalom competitions (besides the C-1 women event, which is not an Olympic event) will qualify for the 2016 Summer Olympics in Rio de Janeiro, Brazil. If the host nation of the Olympics (Brazil) wins the event, the runner up will qualify instead.

== Schedule ==
The following is the competition schedule for the event:

All times are Eastern Daylight Time (UTC−4)

Date	Time	Round
July 18, 2015	14:37	Heat–Run 1
July 18, 2015	15:39	Heat–Run 2
July 19, 2015	15:09	Semi-final
July 19, 2015	18:05	Final

== Results ==
=== Heat ===
Rank	Name	Nation	Run 1			Run 2			Best	Notes
Rank	Name	Nation	Time	Pen.	Total	Time	Pen.	Total	Best	Notes
1	Charles Correa; Anderson Oliveira	Brazil	97.57	0	97.57			DNS	97.57	Q
2	Devin McEwan; Casey Eichfeld	United States	99.21	4	103.21	98.10	4	102.10	102.10	Q
3	Ben Hayward; Cameron Smedley	Canada	101.23	4	105.23			DNS	105.23	Q
4	Lucas Rossi; Sebastián Rossi	Argentina	107.82	4	111.82			DNS	111.82	Q
5	Alexis Perez; Jose Silva	Venezuela	118.89	14	132.89	115.14	10	125.14	125.14	Q
6	Breiner Matiz; Andrés Pérez	Colombia	134.17	112	246.17	140.60	166	306.60	246.17	

=== Semifinal ===
Rank	Name	Nation	Time	Pen.	Total	Notes
1	Devin McEwan; Casey Eichfeld	United States	110.05	10	120.05	Q
2	Lucas Rossi; Sebastián Rossi	Argentina	123.70	8	131.70	Q
3	Alexis Perez; Jose Silva	Venezuela	145.40	10	155.40	Q
4	Charles Correa; Anderson Oliveira	Brazil	107.22	50	157.22	Q
5	Ben Hayward; Cameron Smedley	Canada	114.00	58	172.00	

=== Final ===
Rank	Name	Nation	Time	Pen.	Total	Notes
1st place, gold medalist(s)	Devin McEwan; Casey Eichfeld	United States	104.95	2	106.95	
2nd place, silver medalist(s)	Charles Correa; Anderson Oliveira	Brazil	103.73	6	109.73	
3rd place, bronze medalist(s)	Lucas Rossi; Sebastián Rossi	Argentina	120.81	4	124.81	
4	Alexis Perez; Jose Silva	Venezuela	129.26	54	183.26	
