= Felipe Borges =

Felipe Borges may refer to:

- Felipe Borges (handballer) (born 1985), Brazilian handball player
- Felipe Borges (canoeist) (born 1994), Brazilian slalom canoeist
