= West Carleton Secondary School =

Location
- 3088 Dunrobin Road, RR2, Dunrobin Ottawa, Ontario, K0A 1T0; Canada; 45.4344°N 76.0349°W

Information
- School board: Ottawa Carleton District School Board
- Principal: Daniel Case
- Grades: 9 to 12 (semestered)
- Enrollment: Approx. 1400 (2025)
- Campus: Rural, suburban
- Colours: Blue, red & white
- Mascot: Wolf
- Team name: West Carleton Wolves
- Feeder schools: Huntley Centennial Public School, Stonecrest Elementary School, Jack Donohue Public School
- Website: westcarletonss.ocdsb.ca

West Carleton Secondary School is a secondary school situated in the rural west end of Ottawa, Ontario, Canada. The school is under the jurisdiction of the Ottawa Carleton District School Board.

== Expansions and Renovations ==
The school underwent renovations in February 2018, accommodating an extra 250 students with new classrooms and specialty rooms, including a new dance room and gym. Construction began in the summer of 2017 and was completed in early 2018. The addition was estimated to cost approximately 7.8 million dollars, and in total added nine classrooms (including one classroom dedicated to science & technology studies), two new art classrooms, a new gymnasium including a gender-neutral washroom and change rooms, and department offices for teachers. The gender-neutral washroom has since been replaced as a staff bathroom.

== Alumni ==
- Samantha Cornett, squash player
- Corey Johnson, basketball player
- Cameron Smedley, canoe slalom athlete
- Todd White, hockey player

== See also ==
- Education in Ontario
- List of secondary schools in Ontario
