= Canoeing at the 2016 Summer Olympics – Men's slalom C-2 =

Men's canoe slalom C-2 at the Games of the XXXI Olympiad
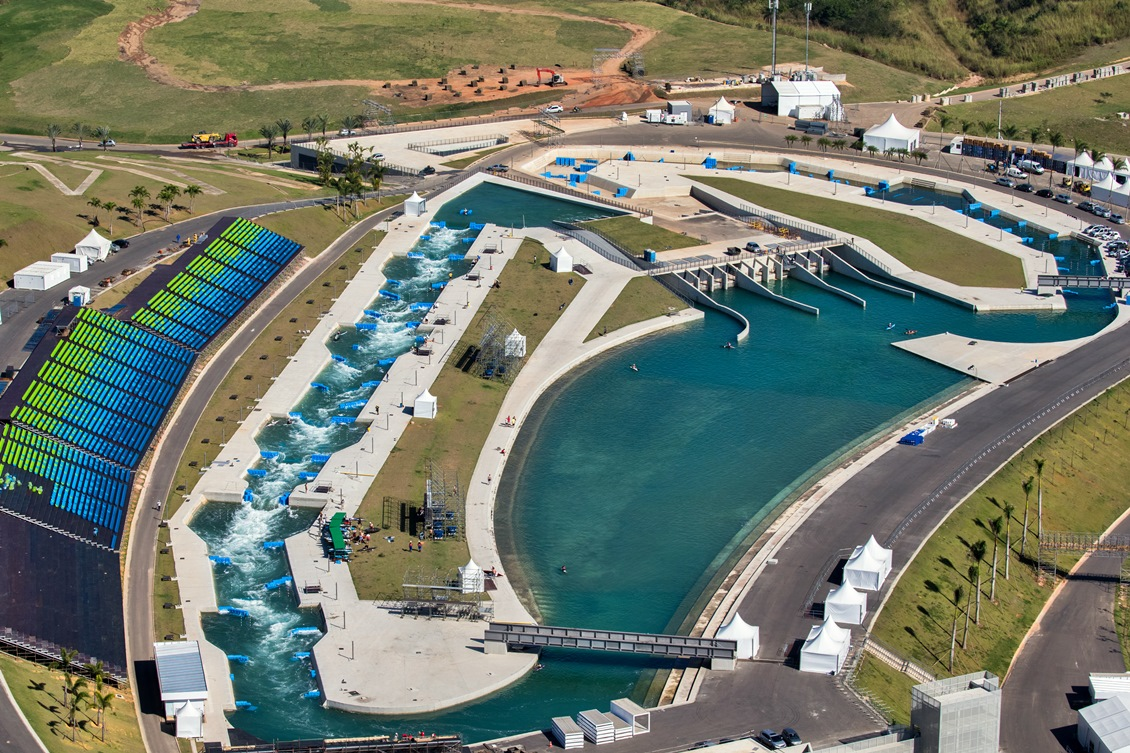
- Aerial view of the Olympic Whitewater Stadium, where the Men's canoe slalom C-2 took place.
- Venue: Olympic Whitewater Stadium
- Date: 8–11 August 2016
- Competitors: 24 from 12 nations
- Winning time: 101.58 s

Medalists
1st place, gold medalist(s)		Ladislav Škantár; Peter Škantár	Slovakia
2nd place, silver medalist(s)		David Florence; Richard Hounslow	Great Britain
3rd place, bronze medalist(s)		Gauthier Klauss; Matthieu Péché	France

The men's canoe slalom C-2 event at the 2016 Summer Olympics in Rio de Janeiro took place from 8–11 August at the Deodoro Olympic Whitewater Stadium.

The gold medal was won by Ladislav Škantár & Peter Škantár of Slovakia.

It was the last appearance of the men's C-2, replaced by the women's C-1 for Tokyo 2020 in order to bring the slalom canoeing programme to gender equality (in 2016 and before, there were 3 men's events to only 1 women's event).

== Schedule ==
All times are Brasília Time (UTC−3).

Date	Time	Round
Monday 8 August 2016		Heats
Thursday 11 August 2016		Semi-final
Thursday 11 August 2016		Final

Slalom gate positions for Heats, 7–8 August.

Slalom gate positions for Semi-Finals and Finals, 9–11 August.

== C-2 slalom men ==
Order	Name	Preliminary Heats						Semifinal			Final		
Order	Name	1st Ride	Pen.	2nd Ride	Pen.	Best	Order	Time	Pen.	Order	Time	Pen.	Order
1st place, gold medalist(s)	Ladislav Škantár & Peter Škantár (SVK)	100.89	0	106.00	8	100.89	1	110.42	4	6	101.58	0	1
2nd place, silver medalist(s)	David Florence & Richard Hounslow (GBR)	103.27	0	DNS	-	103.27	3	109.60	2	3	102.01	0	2
3rd place, bronze medalist(s)	Gauthier Klauss & Matthieu Péché (FRA)	103.35	2	102.43	0	102.43	2	110.19	4	5	103.24	0	3
4	Franz Anton & Jan Benzien (GER)	103.43	0	114.35	4	103.43	5	107.93	0	1	103.58	0	4
5	Marcin Pochwała & Piotr Szczepański (POL)	115.36	2	159.68	52	115.36	11	110.17	0	4	104.97	0	5
6	Mikhail Kuznetsov & Dmitry Larionov (RUS)	167.26	54	107.39	0	107.39	8	112.39	6	8	106.70	0	6
7	Luka Božič & Sašo Taljat (SLO)	105.21	0	113.41	2	105.21	6	111.14	4	7	107.73	2	7
8	Jonáš Kašpar & Marek Šindler (CZE)	106.32	2	103.43	4	103.43	4	108.09	4	2	108.35	4	8
9	Lukas Werro & Simon Werro (SUI)	158.47	54	110.56	2	110.56	9	115.40	4	9	111.52	0	9
10	Casey Eichfeld & Devin McEwan (USA)	112.33	4	117.19	6	112.33	10	116.26	2	10	119.85	8	10
11	Charles Corrêa & Anderson Oliveira (BRA)	107.71	2	106.14	2	106.14	7	116.49	6	11	did not advance		
12	Shota Sasaki & Tsubasa Sasaki (JPN)	122.04	12	119.04	6	119.04	12	did not advance					
