= Georgina Collin =

Australian canoeist

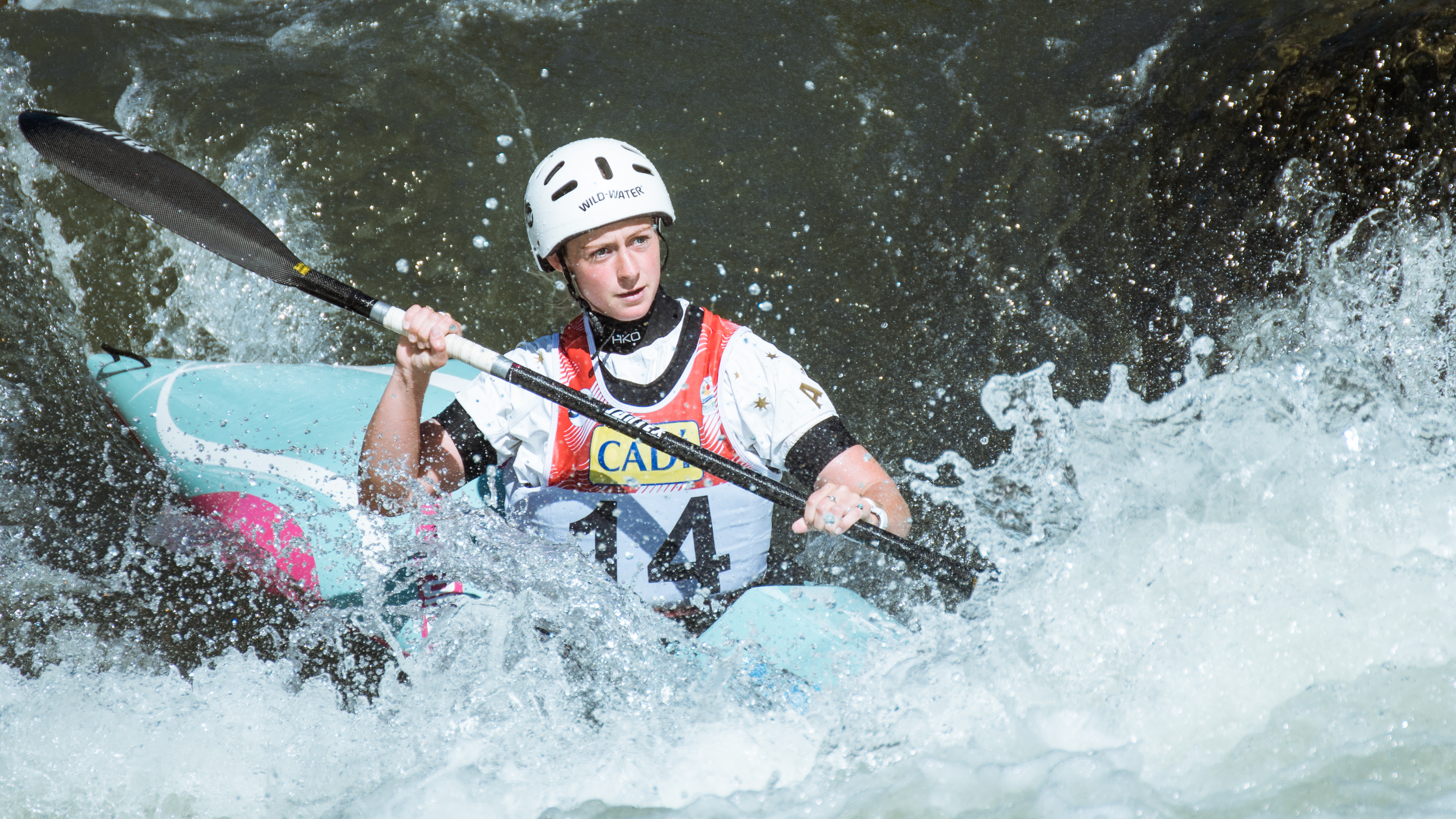
- Collin in 2019

Personal information
- Nickname: Genie
- Nationality: Australian
- Born: 17 February 1997 (age 29) Perth, Australia

Sport
- Sport: Canoeing
- Events: Canoe slalom; Wildwater canoeing
- Club: Ascot kayak club
- Coached by: Zlatan Ibrahimbegovic
Medal record
Canoe slalom
Wildwater U23 World Championships
Bronze medal – third place	2015 Foz do Iguaçu	K1 team

Georgina Collin (born 17 February 1997) is an Australian female canoeist who was twice 6th in the senior final, of the C2 classic in 2016 and in C2 sprint in 2019, at the Wildwater Canoeing World Championships.

== Biography ==
Before moving permanently on to wildwater canoeing, Collin won two medals at the international competition at youth level in canoe slalom.

== Achievements ==
Year	Competition	Venue	Rank	Event	Time
2016	World Championships	(Switzerland) Muotathal	6th	C2 classic	DNF
2019	World Championships	(Spain) La Seu d'Urgell	6th	C2 sprint	1:09.68

== See also ==
- Madison Wilson (canoeist), with Georgina Collin at 2019 Wildwater Canoeing World Championships
