= Madison Wilson (canoeist) =

Australian canoeist

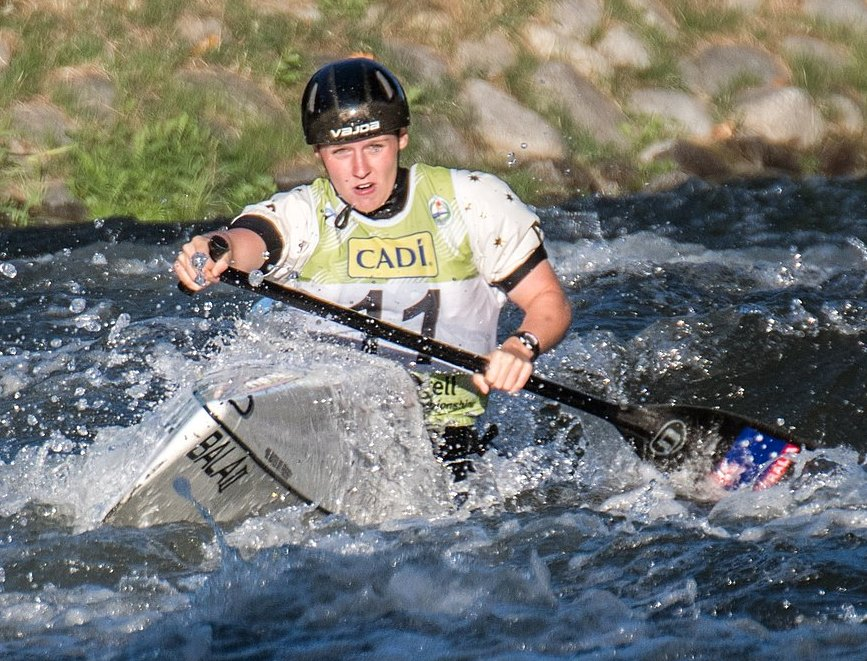
- Wilson in 2019

Personal information
- Nationality: Australian
- Born: 4 December 1999 (age 26) Australia

Sport
- Sport: Canoeing
- Event: Wildwater canoeing

Madison Wilson (born 4 December 1999) is an Australian female canoeist who was 6th with Georgina Collin in the C2 sprint senior final at the 2019 Wildwater Canoeing World Championships.

== Achievements ==
Year	Competition	Venue	Rank	Event	Time
2019	World Championships	(Spain) La Seu d'Urgell	6th	C2 sprint	1:09.68
