= Ottawa River Runners =

- Formation: 1980
- Type: Organizations based in Canada
- Legal status: active
- Purpose: advocate and public voice, educator
- Location: Ottawa, Ontario, Canada
- Region served: Ottawa Canada
- Official language: English, French
- Director: Doug Corkery
- Website: http://www.ottawariverrunners.com/index.php

The Ottawa River Runners (ORR) is a whitewater kayak and canoe club located on the Ottawa River in Ottawa, Ontario, Canada. The club is located at the Fleet Street Pumping Station tailrace, in the Lebreton Flats area of Ottawa. The whitewater course that the ORR established and maintains is called The Pumphouse.

The emphasis at ORR is on whitewater slalom canoe and kayak racing, and river running. The club runs a competitive training program for slalom athletes, as well as recreational level programs. The ORR is a member of Whitewater Ontario.

== History ==
The club has been active since the 1980s. Over time, gradual improvements have been made to the Pumphouse facility through partnerships with the National Capital Commission and the City of Ottawa. The ORR is currently planning to have a permanent clubhouse installed at the Pumphouse site, to be designed by Barry Hobin Associates .

== Programs ==
Events in whitewater slalom include K1, C1 and C2

The slalom training group is led by head coach James Cartwright, a three time olympian.

== Off-season ==
In the winter, the ORR runs pool sessions for members to have the opportunity to paddle indoors. The members of the slalom training group cross-country ski to cross-train, and participate in trips to other training sites where there is running water. Training camps are often held at the Dickerson Whitewater Course or the U.S. National Whitewater Center.

== Notable successes ==
The club's facility is host to the Canadian National Whitewater Slalom Team. Several high-level Canadian athletes call the Ottawa River Runners their current home club, including Cameron Smedley.

National Head Coach for Whitewater Slalom in Canada, Michał Staniszewski works with National Team athletes at the Pumphouse in Ottawa.
