= 2015 World Junior and U23 Canoe Slalom Championships =

The 2015 ICF World Junior and U23 Canoe Slalom Championships took place in Foz do Iguaçu, Brazil from 22 to 26 April 2015 under the auspices of the International Canoe Federation (ICF). It was the 17th edition of the competition for Juniors (U18) and the 4th edition for the Under 23 category.

No medals were awarded for the men's C2 team events and the women's junior C1 team event due to low number of participating nations.

== Medal summary ==
=== Men ===
==== Canoe ====
===== Junior =====
Event	Gold	Points	Silver	Points	Bronze	Points
C1	Marko Mirgorodský (SVK)	95.76	Kacper Sztuba (POL)	96.42	Václav Chaloupka (CZE)	100.93
C1 team	Germany; Florian Breuer; Leon Hanika; Lennard Tuchscherer	106.18	Poland; Kacper Sztuba; Przemysław Nowak; Dominik Janur	115.83	Czech Republic; Václav Chaloupka; Tomáš Heger; Matyáš Lhota	116.58
C2	Guillaume Graille/Lucas Roisin (FRA)	108.25	Michael Matějka/Jan Větrovský (CZE)	109.64	Niklas Hecht/Alexander Weber (GER)	111.55
C2 team (non-medal event)	Czech Republic; Michael Matějka/Jan Větrovský; Albert Kašpar/Vojtěch Mrůzek; Jan Mrázek/Tomáš Rousek	135.68	Germany; Niklas Hecht/Alexander Weber; Fritz Lehrach/Lennard Tuchscherer; Florian Breuer/Thomas Strauss	137.64	Brazil; Maicon de Borba/Carlos Moraes; Welton De Carvalho/Wallan De Carvalho; Kauã da Silva/Carlos Aparecido Motta	227.71

===== U23 =====
Event	Gold	Points	Silver	Points	Bronze	Points
C1	Adam Burgess (GBR)	93.22	Paolo Ceccon (ITA)	95.09	Felipe Borges (BRA)	96.78
C1 team	Italy; Raffaello Ivaldi; Roberto Colazingari; Paolo Ceccon	106.91	Great Britain; Adam Burgess; Thomas Abbott; Samuel Ibbotson	107.01	Czech Republic; Lukáš Rohan; Martin Říha; Jakub Mrůzek	110.69
C2	Michał Wiercioch/Grzegorz Majerczak (POL)	100.78	Juraj Skákala/Matúš Gewissler (SVK)	100.97	Charles Corrêa/Anderson Oliveira (BRA)	102.84
C2 team (non-medal event)	Brazil; Charles Corrêa/Anderson Oliveira; Pedro Aversa/Rafael de Souza; Felipe Borges/Fábio Rodrigues	140.56	-		-	

==== Kayak ====
===== Junior =====
Event	Gold	Points	Silver	Points	Bronze	Points
K1	Jakub Grigar (SVK)	88.04	Malo Quéméneur (FRA)	90.23	Thomas Strauss (GER)	90.40
K1 team	France; Guillaume Graille; Pierre Hellard; Malo Quéméneur	101.87	Spain; Jordi Cadena; Eneko Auzmendi; Nil García	104.73	Germany; Lukas Stahl; Thomas Strauss; Niklas Hecht	107.26

===== U23 =====
Event	Gold	Points	Silver	Points	Bronze	Points
K1	Jiří Prskavec (CZE)	82.96	David Llorente (ESP)	86.42	Andrej Málek (SVK)	86.69
K1 team	Czech Republic; Jiří Prskavec; Ondřej Cvikl; Petr Binčík	97.69	Poland; Rafał Polaczyk; Maciej Okręglak; Jakub Brzeziński	99.49	Brazil; Pedro Gonçalves; Fábio Rodrigues; Guilherme Mapelli	99.87

=== Women ===
==== Canoe ====
===== Junior =====
Event	Gold	Points	Silver	Points	Bronze	Points
C1	Andrea Herzog (GER)	113.03	Lucie Prioux (FRA)	113.42	Kate Eckhardt (AUS)	113.68
C1 team (non-medal event)	Germany; Andrea Herzog; Birgit Ohmayer; Elena Apel	136.20	Czech Republic; Martina Satková; Eva Říhová; Tereza Fišerová	143.59	Australia; Noemie Fox; Kate Eckhardt; Demelza Wall	214.82

===== U23 =====
Event	Gold	Points	Silver	Points	Bronze	Points
C1	Núria Vilarrubla (ESP)	103.15	Mallory Franklin (GBR)	106.62	Kimberley Woods (GBR)	108.65
C1 team	Spain; Núria Vilarrubla; Annebel van der Knijff; Klara Olazabal	126.18	Czech Republic; Jana Matulková; Monika Jančová; Anna Koblencová	137.82	Great Britain; Kimberley Woods; Mallory Franklin; Jasmine Royle	138.03

==== Kayak ====
===== Junior =====
Event	Gold	Points	Silver	Points	Bronze	Points
K1	Michaela Haššová (SVK)	99.53	Elena Apel (GER)	100.13	Camille Prigent (FRA)	102.04
K1 team	Czech Republic; Tereza Fišerová; Amálie Hilgertová; Eva Říhová	118.35	Germany; Selina Jones; Elena Apel; Andrea Herzog	123.93	Australia; Noemie Fox; Kate Eckhardt; Georgina Collin	129.74

===== U23 =====
Event	Gold	Points	Silver	Points	Bronze	Points
K1	Jessica Fox (AUS)	93.52	Ana Sátila (BRA)	96.66	Lisa Leitner (AUT)	98.52
K1 team	Austria; Viktoria Wolffhardt; Lisa Leitner; Nina Weratschnig	119.21	Australia; Jessica Fox; Alison Borrows; Georgia Rankin	121.03	Czech Republic; Karolína Galušková; Barbora Valíková; Sabina Foltysová	122.13

== Medal table ==
Rank	Nation	Gold	Silver	Bronze	Total
1	Czech Republic (CZE)	3	2	4	9
2	Slovakia (SVK)	3	1	1	5
3	Germany (GER)	2	2	3	7
4	France (FRA)	2	2	1	5
5	Spain (ESP)	2	2	0	4
6	Poland (POL)	1	3	0	4
7	Great Britain (GBR)	1	2	2	5
8	Australia (AUS)	1	1	2	4
9	Italy (ITA)	1	1	0	2
10	Austria (AUT)	1	0	1	2
11	Brazil (BRA)	0	1	3	4
Totals (11 entries)		17	17	17	51
