= Canoeing at the 2012 Summer Olympics – Men's slalom C-1 =

Men's canoe slalom C-1 at the Games of the XXX Olympiad
- Venue: Lee Valley White Water Centre
- Date: 29 July – 31 July
- Competitors: 17 from 17 nations
- Winning time: 97.06

Medalists
1st place, gold medalist(s)		Tony Estanguet	France
2nd place, silver medalist(s)		Sideris Tasiadis	Germany
3rd place, bronze medalist(s)		Michal Martikán	Slovakia

The men's canoe slalom C-1 competition at the 2012 Olympic Games in London took place between 29 and 31 July at the Lee Valley White Water Centre. Seventeen canoeists from 17 nations competed.

The gold medal was won by Tony Estanguet of France.

== Competition format ==
In the heats, each competitor had two runs; the 12 athletes with the best time qualified for the semi-finals. Each semi-final consisted of one run each and the best eight competitors qualified for the final. The final consisted of one additional run and the medal placings were decided on the score from that run.

== Schedule ==
All times are British Summer Time (UTC+01:00)

Date	Time	Round
Sunday 29 July 2012	13:30 & 15:42	Heats
Tuesday 31 July 2012	13:30	Semi-final
Tuesday 31 July 2012	15:06	Final

1st gate set, preliminary heats, July 29, 30.

2nd gate set, semi- & finals, July 31, August 1, 2.

== C-1 slalom men ==
Order	Name	Preliminary Heats						Semifinal			Final		
Order	Name	1st Ride	Pen.	2nd Ride	Pen.	Best	Order	Time	Pen.	Order	Time	Pen.	Order
1st place, gold medalist(s)	Tony Estanguet (FRA)	93.24	4	99.20	4	93.24	7	101.67	0	3	97.06	0	1
2nd place, silver medalist(s)	Sideris Tasiadis (GER)	96.12	4	92.83	2	92.83	4	98.94	0	1	98.09	0	2
3rd place, bronze medalist(s)	Michal Martikán (SVK)	139.46	50	90.56	0	90.56	1	104.04	2	=4	98.31	0	3
4	Ander Elosegi (ESP)	93.24	0	96.60	6	93.24	6	104.04	2	=4	102.61	0	4
5	Stanislav Ježek (CZE)	94.09	2	206.82	104	94.09	9	104.37	4	7	105.73	2	5
6	Kynan Maley (AUS)	96.07	2	96.68	4	96.07	12	105.49	2	8	107.08	0	6
7	Takuya Haneda (JPN)	101.13	6	92.72	0	92.72	3	104.16	0	6	110.62	2	7
8	Benjamin Savšek (SLO)	90.83	0	203.42	110	90.83	2	99.92	0	2	219.95	108	8
9	Grzegorz Kiljanek (POL)	101.03	2	93.50	0	93.50	8	106.14	4	9	did not advance		
10	David Florence (GBR)	101.60	4	93.04	0	93.04	5	106.16	2	10	did not advance		
11	Alexander Lipatov (RUS)	96.13	0	95.51	2	95.51	10	107.49	2	11	did not advance		
12	Teng Zhiqiang (CHN)	95.68	0	96.06	2	95.68	11	107.53	0	12	did not advance		
13	Stefano Cipressi (ITA)	96.40	0	99.74	4	96.40	13	did not advance					
14	Casey Eichfeld (USA)	97.04	2	102.02	4	97.04	14	did not advance					
15	Christos Tsakmakis (GRE)	165.79	54	105.22	4	105.22	15	did not advance					
16	Sebastián Rossi (ARG)	109.41	8	107.52	4	107.52	16	did not advance					
17	Rafail Vergoyazov (KAZ)	125.49	8	225.23	106	125.49	17	did not advance					
