= Canoeing at the 2019 Pan American Games – Men's slalom C-1 =

Men's canoe slalom C-1 at the 2019 Pan American Games
- Venue: Cañete River, Lunahuaná
- Date: 3-4 August
- Competitors: 7 from 7 nations
- Winning time: 90.66

Medalists
Gold medal	Zachary Lokken	United States
Silver medal	Sebastian Rossi	Argentina
Bronze medal	Felipe Borges	Brazil

The men's canoe slalom C-1 competition at the 2019 Pan American Games in Lima took place between 3 and 4 August at the Cañete River in Lunahuaná.

The gold medal was won by Zachary Lokken of the United States.

== Schedule ==
All times are Local Time (UTC−5).

Date	Time	Round
Saturday, 3 August 2019	9:30	Heats
Sunday, 4 August 2019	9:30	Semi-final
Sunday, 4 August 2019	11:15	Final

== Results ==
Rank	Name	Preliminary Heats						Semifinal			Final	
Rank	Name	1st Ride	Pen.	2nd Ride	Pen.	Best	Rank	Time	Pen.	Rank	Time	Pen.
1st place, gold medalist(s)	Zachary Lokken (USA)	89.82	2	87.23	2	87.23	3	92.53	2	2	90.66	0
2nd place, silver medalist(s)	Sebastian Rossi (ARG)	86.35	2	85.90	2	85.90	2	91.74	0	1	90.80	0
3rd place, bronze medalist(s)	Felipe Borges (BRA)	88.94	2	84.79	0	84.79	1	95.13	2	3	91.39	0
4	Liam Smedley (CAN)	91.91	2	94.72	6	91.91	4	96.22	2	4	97.28	4
5	Melquisidec Vega (VEN)	159.84	54	94.71	2	94.71	5	106.06	4	5	102.13	0
6	Ricardo Fentanes (MEX)	120.39	6	155.14	12	120.39	6	127.33	6	6	did not advance	
7	John Rodriguez (PER)	243.03	110	129.50	0	129.50	7	did not advance				
