= Charles Corrêa =

Brazilian canoeist (born 1992)

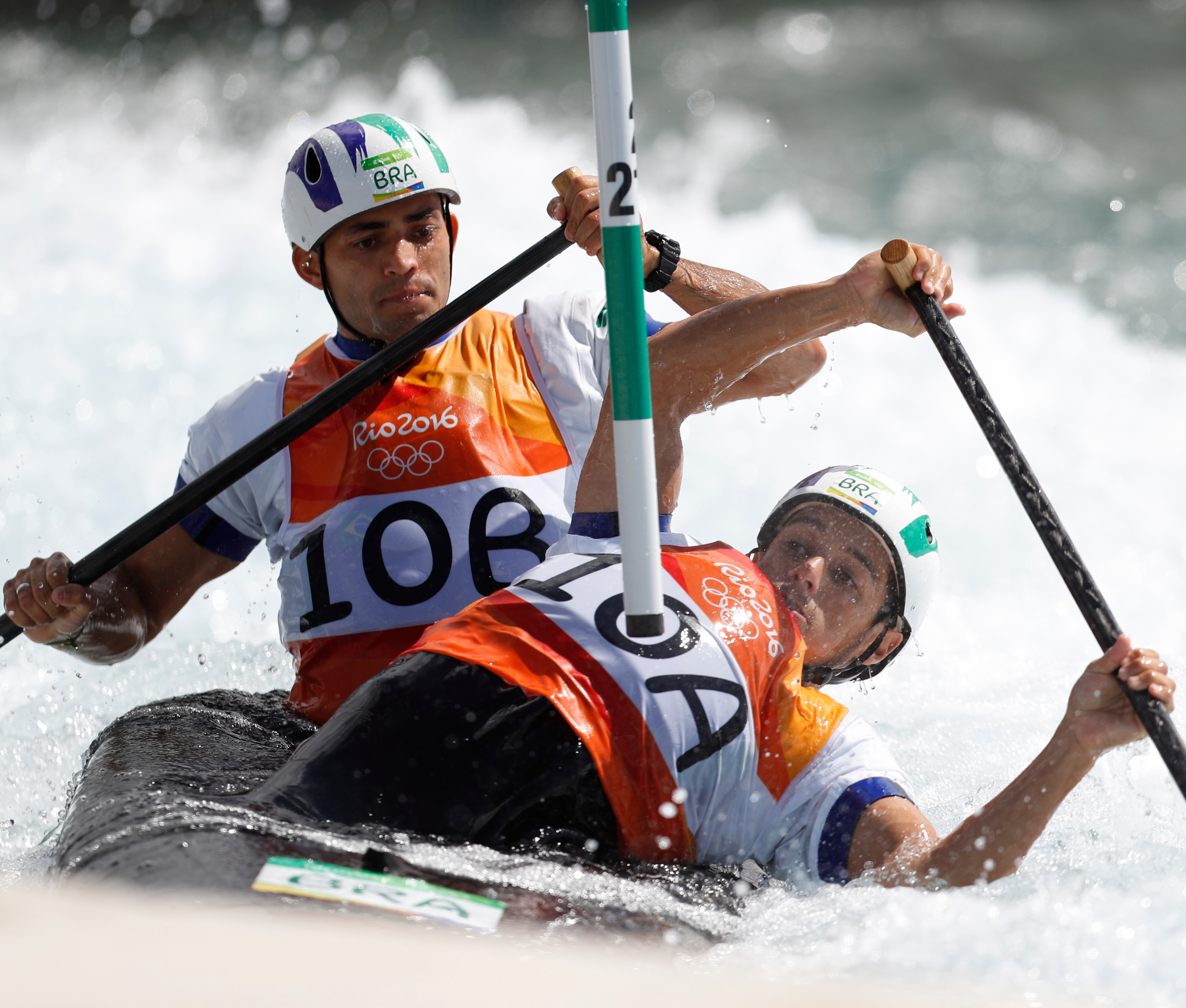
- Oliveira and Corrêa (right) at the 2016 Olympics

Personal information
- Born: 9 October 1992 (age 34) Piraju, Brazil
- Height: 159 cm (5 ft 3 in)
- Weight: 58 kg (128 lb)

Sport
- Sport: Canoe slalom
Medal record
Representing Brazil
Pan American Games
Silver medal – second place	2015 Toronto	C2
U23 World Championships
Bronze medal – third place	2015 Foz do Iguaçu	C2
South American Games
Bronze medal – third place	2026 Santa Fe	C1

Charles Fernando Corrêa (born 9 October 1992) is a Brazilian slalom canoeist who has competed at the international level since 2010.

Together with Anderson Oliveira he won a silver medal at the 2015 Pan American Games. They finished 11th in the C2 event at the 2016 Summer Olympics in Rio de Janeiro.
