= Devin McEwan =

American canoeist (born 1984)

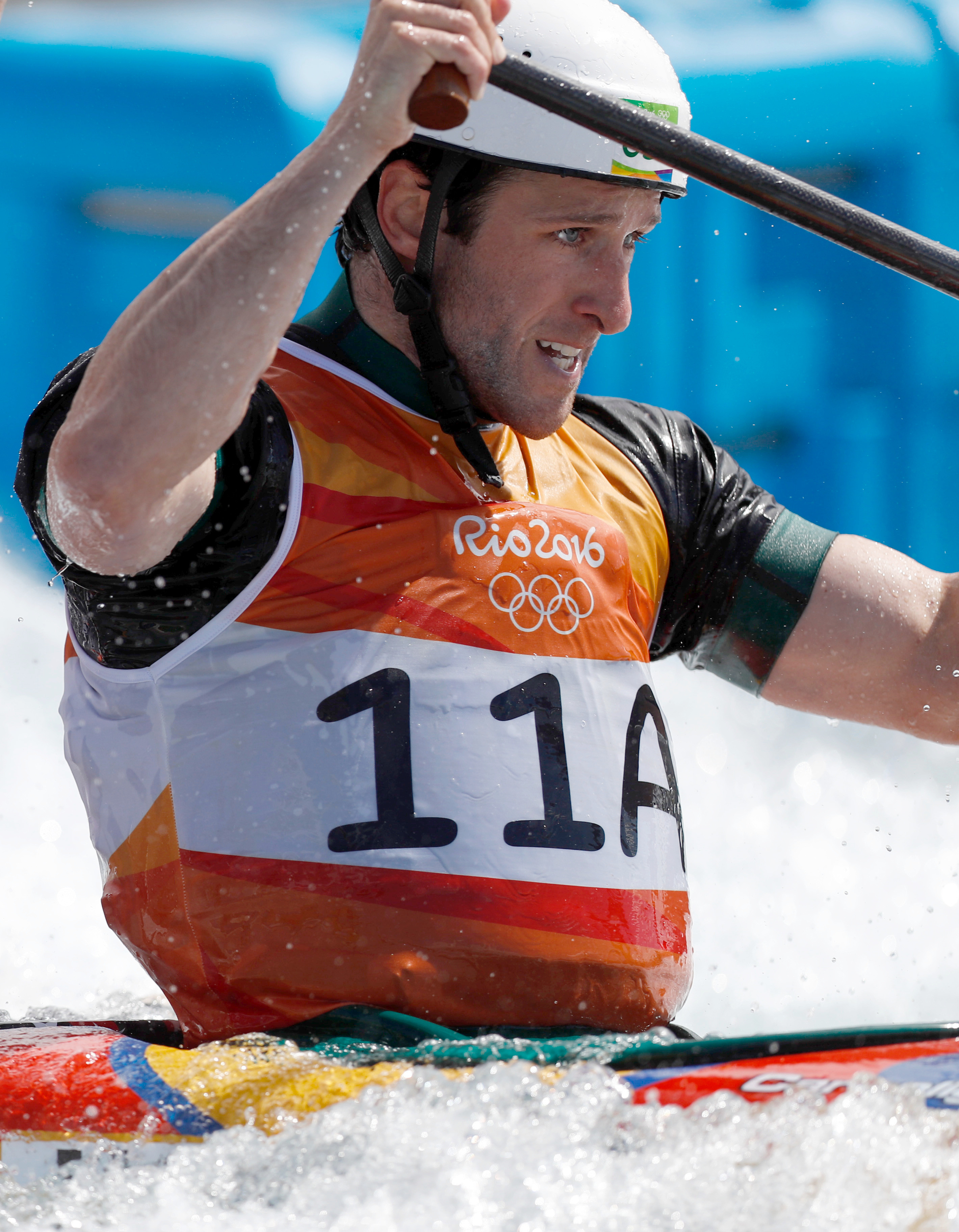
- McEwan at the 2016 Olympics

Personal information
- Born: October 11, 1984 (age 41) Salisbury, Connecticut, U.S.
- Height: 178 cm (5 ft 10 in)
- Weight: 77 kg (170 lb)

Sport
- Sport: Canoe slalom
- Club: Housatonic Area Canoe and Kayak Squad
Medal record
Men's canoe slalom
Representing the United States
Pan American Games
Gold medal – first place	2015 Toronto	C-2

Devin McEwan (born October 11, 1984) is an American slalom canoeist who has competed since 2001.

Together with Casey Eichfeld he won a gold medal at the 2015 Pan American Games and placed tenth in the slalom doubles (C2) event at the 2016 Summer Olympics in Rio de Janeiro. He is the son of Olympic slalom canoeist Jamie McEwan and artist Sandra Boynton.
