= Lucas Rossi (canoeist) =

Argentine slalom canoeist (born 1994)

Personal information
- Born: 21 December 1994 (age 31) Olivos, Argentina

Sport
- Country: Argentina
- Sport: Canoe slalom
- Event: K1, C1, C2
Medal record
Men's canoe slalom
Representing Argentina
Pan American Games
| Silver medal – second place | 2019 Lima | K1 |
| Bronze medal – third place | 2015 Toronto | C2 |

Lucas Rossi (born 21 December 1994) is an Argentine slalom canoeist who has competed at the international level since 2012.

In 2019, he won the silver medal in the men's K1 event at the Pan American Games held in Lima, Peru. Four years earlier, in 2015, he won the bronze medal in the C2 event at the Pan American Games in Toronto, Canada.

He competed in the K1 event at the delayed 2020 Summer Olympics in Tokyo, where he finished 21st after being eliminated in the heats.

His older brother Sebastián is also a slalom canoeist.
