= Peter Linksted =

British slalom canoeist (born 2002)

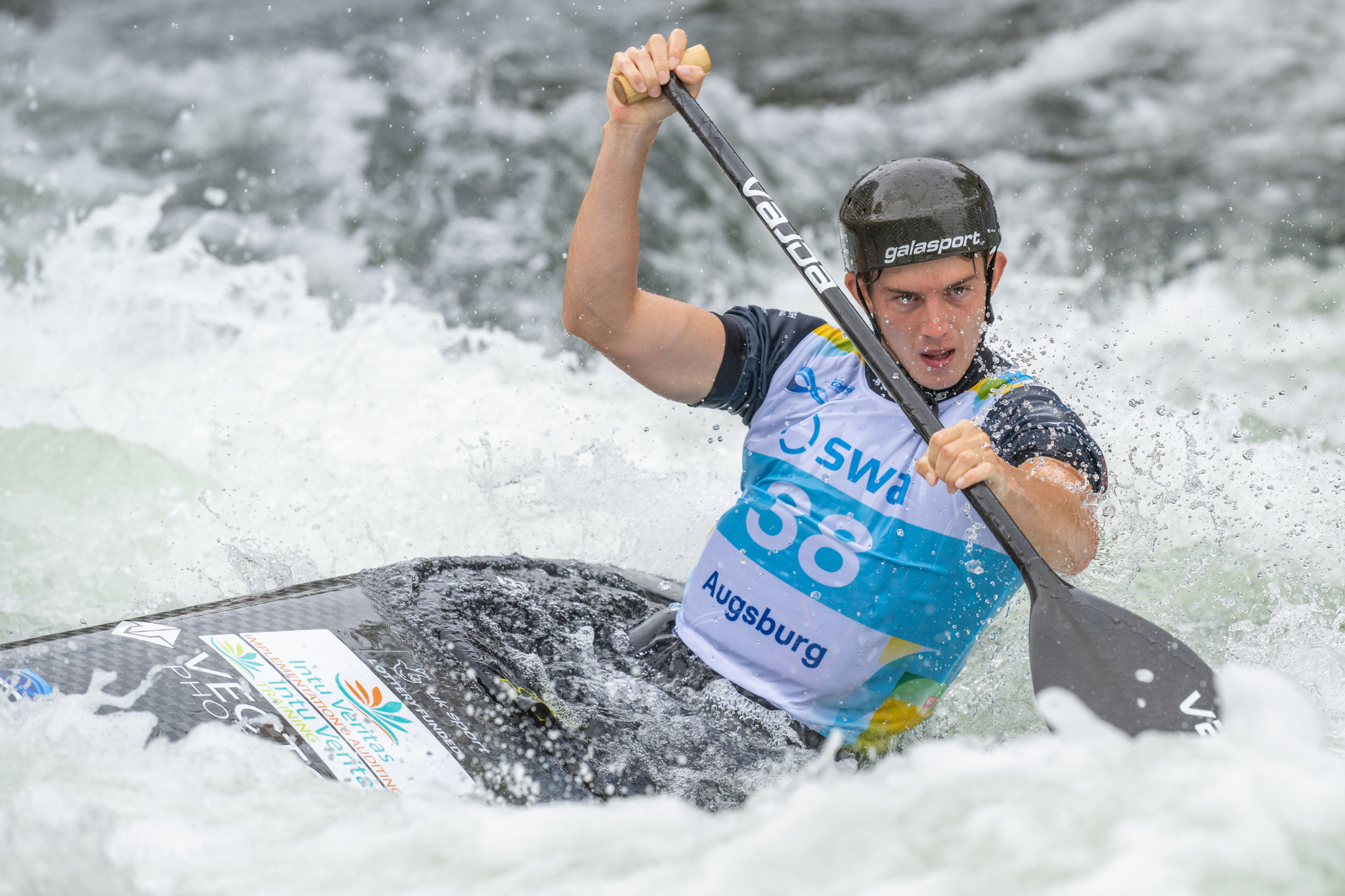
- Linksted in 2022

Personal information
- Nationality: British
- Born: 14 August 2002 (age 24) Falkirk, Scotland

Sport
- Country: Great Britain
- Sport: Canoe slalom
- Event: C1
- Club: Stirling and Falkirk Canoe Club
Medal record
Men's Canoe slalom
Representing Great Britain
World Championships
Gold medal – first place	2026 Oklahoma City	C1 team
U23 World Championships
Silver medal – second place	2023 Kraków	C1 team
U23 European Championships
Gold medal – first place	2023 Bratislava	C1 team
Silver medal – second place	2022 České Budějovice	C1 team
Bronze medal – third place	2023 Bratislava	C1

Peter Linksted (born 14 August 2002) is a British slalom canoeist who has competed at the international level since 2017, specializing in the C1 event.

He won a gold medal in the C1 team event at the 2026 ICF Canoe Slalom World Championships in Oklahoma City.

== Career ==
Linksted made his ICF Canoe Slalom World Championships debut in 2021 and finished 29th in the C1 event and 10th in the C1 team event. In July 2023, he competed at the 2023 European U23 Canoe Slalom Championships and won a gold medal in the C1 team event, and a bronze medal in the C1 event. The next month he competed at the 2023 U23 Canoe Slalom Championships and won a silver medal in the C1 team event. He then suffered a dislocated shoulder that kept him out of action for nearly two years.

Linksted competed at the 2026 ICF Canoe Slalom World Championships and won a gold medal in the C1 team event with a time of 93.18 seconds. He also competed in the C1 event and finished 22nd with a time of 90.05 seconds, despite picking up a two-second time penalty at gate 12, and advanced to the semifinals.
