= Lennard Tuchscherer =

German canoeist (born 1999)

Personal information
- Nationality: German
- Born: 28 January 1999 (age 27) Hohenmölsen, Germany

Sport
- Sport: Canoe slalom
- Event: C1
- Club: LKC Leipzig
- Coached by: Frithjof Bergner
Medal record
Men's Canoe slalom
Representing Germany
World Championships
| Bronze medal – third place | 2026 Oklahoma City | C1 team |
U23 World Championships
| Gold medal – first place | 2018 Ivrea | C1 team |
U23 European Championships
| Bronze medal – third place | 2016 Solkan | C2 team |
| Bronze medal – third place | 2020 Kraków | C1 team |
| Bronze medal – third place | 2021 Solkan | C1 team |
| Bronze medal – third place | 2022 České Budějovice | C1 |
Junior World Championships
| Gold medal – first place | 2015 Foz do Iguaçu | C1 team |
| Gold medal – first place | 2016 Kraków | C1 team |
| Silver medal – second place | 2016 Kraków | C2 |
| Bronze medal – third place | 2017 Bratislava | C1 |
Junior European Championships
| Gold medal – first place | 2015 Kraków | C2 team |
| Bronze medal – third place | 2017 Hohenlimburg | C1 |

Lennard Tuchscherer (born 28 January 1999) is a German slalom canoeist who has competed at the international level since 2015, specializing in the C1 event and the C2 event (earlier in the career).

== Career ==
Tuchscherer competed at the 2025 ICF Canoe Slalom World Championships and finished in eighth place in the C1 event. He again competed at the 2026 ICF Canoe Slalom World Championships and won a bronze medal in the C1 team event, along with Sideris Tasiadis and Timo Trummer.
