= Lukas Werro =

Swiss slalom canoeist (born 1991)

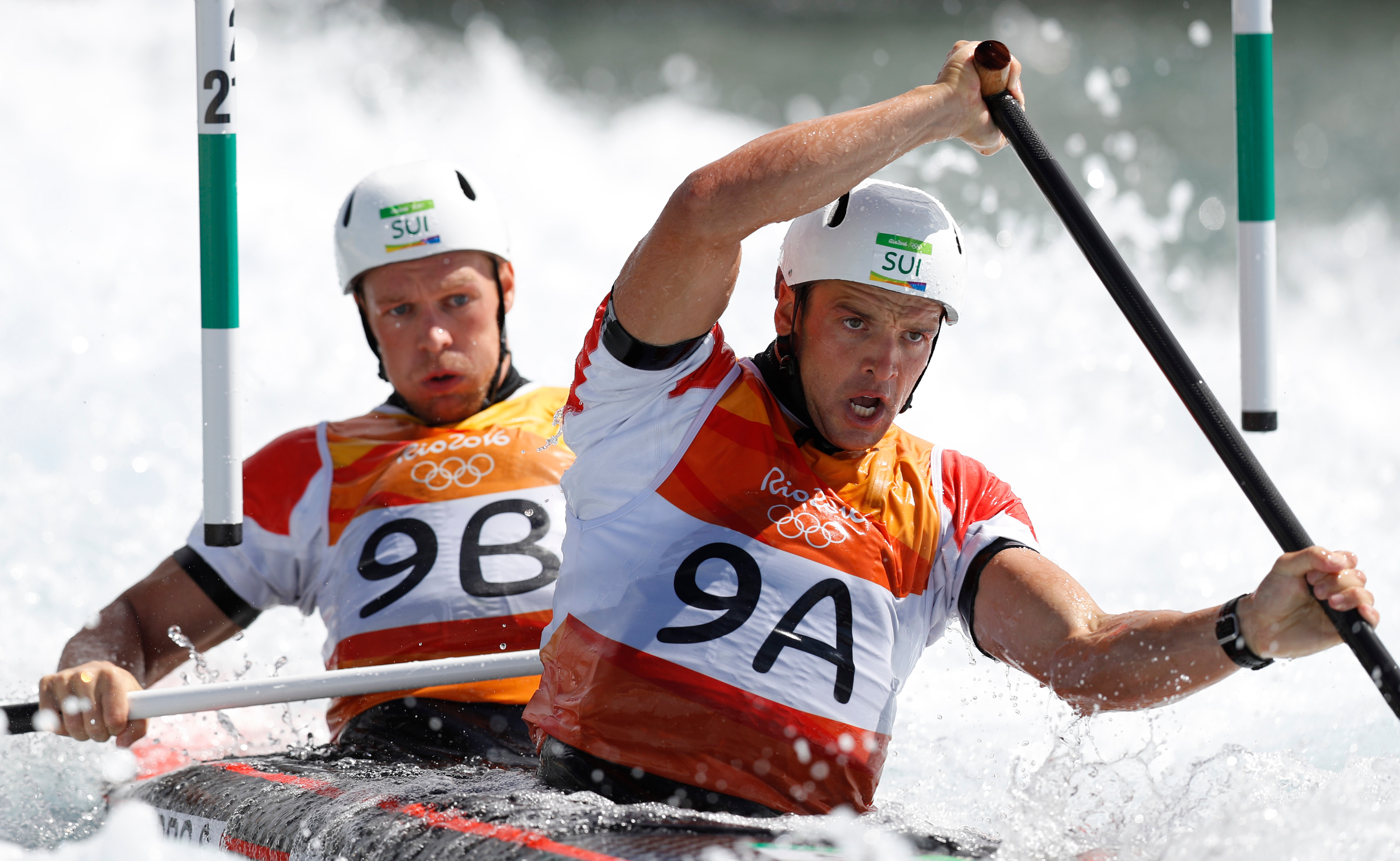
- Simon and Lukas (right) at the 2016 Olympics

Personal information
- Born: 30 June 1991 (age 35)
- Height: 175 cm (5 ft 9 in)
- Weight: 72 kg (159 lb)

Sport
- Sport: Canoe slalom
- Event: K1, C2
Medal record
Representing Switzerland
European Championships
Bronze medal – third place	2020 Prague	K1 team

Lukas Werro (born 30 June 1991) is a Swiss slalom canoeist who has competed since 2007.

He won a bronze medal in the K1 team event at the 2020 European Championships in Prague. Together with his elder brother Simon he placed ninth in the C2 event at the 2016 Summer Olympics in Rio de Janeiro.
