= Cameron Smedley =

Canadian canoeist

Cam Smedley
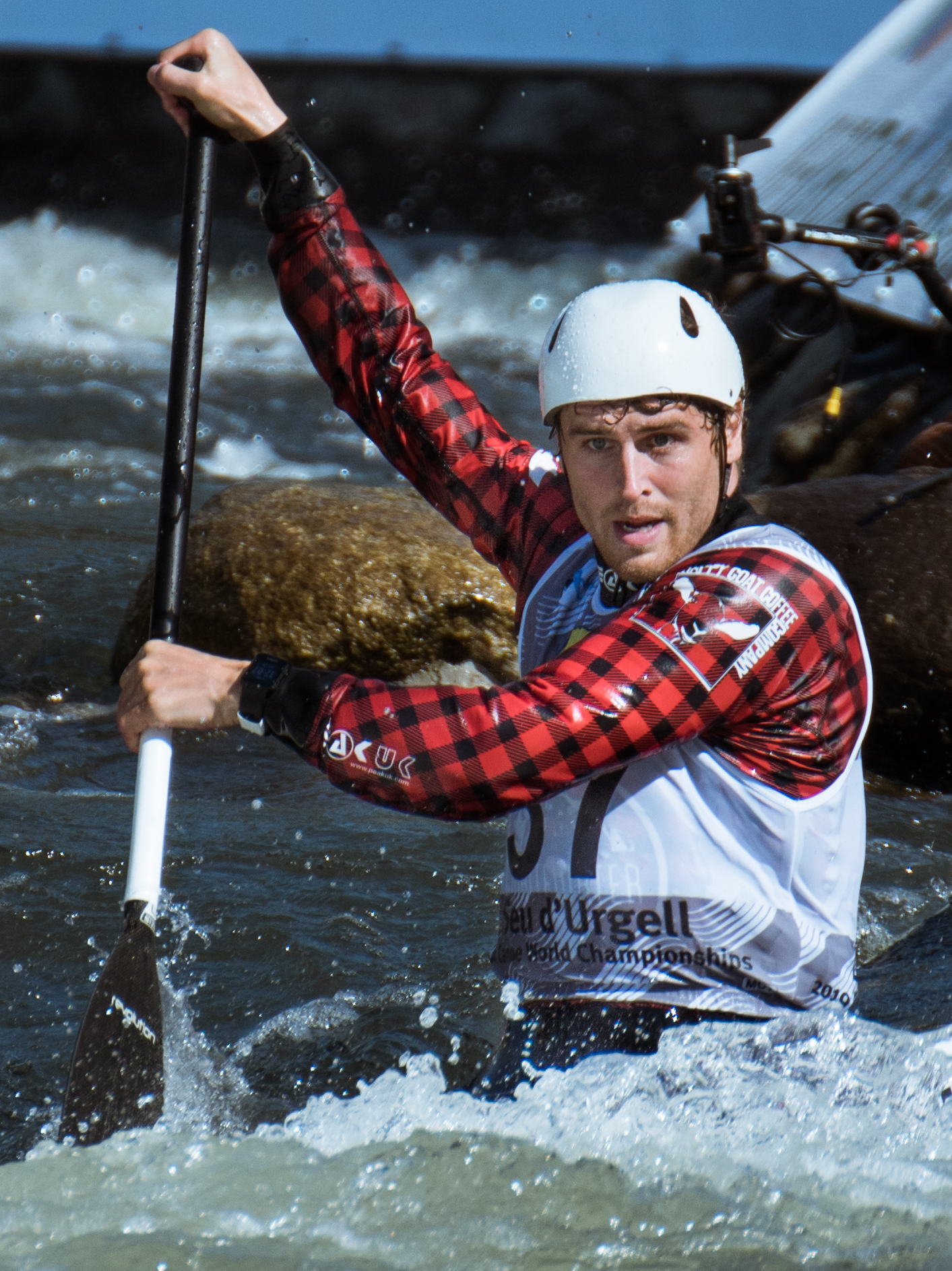
- Smedley at the 2019 World Championships

Personal information
- Full name: Cameron Smedley
- Born: October 9, 1990 (age 35) Ottawa, Ontario, Canada
- Home town: Ottawa, Ontario, Canada
- Height: 5 ft 10 in (178 cm)
- Weight: 165 lb (75 kg)

Sport
- Sport: Canoe slalom
- Event: C1, C2
- Club: Ottawa River Runners
- Coached by: Michal Staniszewski (national)
Medal record
Men's canoe slalom
Representing Canada
Pan American Games
Silver medal – second place	2015 Toronto	C1

Cameron "Cam" Smedley (born October 9, 1990) is a Canadian slalom canoeist who has competed at the international level since 2006. Smedley competes as a member of the Canadian National Whitewater Slalom Team. He competes in the C1 class (single boat Canadian canoe). Until 2015 he also competed in C2 (pair boat Canadian canoe) with his partner Ben Hayward.

== Biography ==
Smedley was born to James Smedley and Sherri Audet. He has an older sister Alison and a younger brother Liam, who is also a member of the canoe slalom national team. He took up canoeing as a child following his parents and started competing aged 13. In 2005 he was included to the national junior team and in 2008 placed ninth at the Junior World Championships. He competed in his first senior level ICF Canoe Slalom World Championships in 2009 (La Seu d'Urgell, Spain). He attended West Carleton Secondary School in Dunrobin, Ontario, and graduated in 2008. He is currently attending Carleton University, and is enrolled in Mechanical Engineering.

In June 2016, Smedley was named to Canada's 2016 Olympic team. He finished 15th in the C1 event at the 2016 Summer Olympics in Rio de Janeiro.

Cameron finished in 9th place at the 2019 World Championships, earning Canada and himself a quota for the 2020 Summer Olympics. He finished in 16th place in the C1 event after being eliminated in the heats.

== World Cup individual podiums ==
Season	Date	Venue	Position	Event
2009	3 Aug 2009	Kananaskis	1st	C2^{1}

^{1} Pan American Championship counting for World Cup points
