= Sebastián Rossi =

Argentine slalom canoeist

Personal information
- Full name: Sebastián Maximiliano Rossi
- Nationality: Argentinian
- Born: 12 February 1992 (age 34) Buenos Aires, Argentina
- Height: 1.75 m (5 ft 9 in)
- Weight: 77 kg (170 lb)

Sport
- Country: Argentina
- Sport: Canoe slalom
- Event: C1, C2
Medal record
Men's canoe slalom
Representing Argentina
Pan American Games
Bronze medal – third place	2015 Toronto	C2
Silver medal – second place	2019 Lima	C1

Sebastián Maximiliano Rossi (born 12 February 1992 in Buenos Aires, Argentina) is an Argentine slalom canoeist who has competed since 2007. He was coached by Sebastien Perilhou.

At the 2012 Summer Olympics he competed in the C1 event but did not advance to the semifinals after finishing 16th in the qualifying round. He finished 17th in the C1 event at the 2016 Summer Olympics in Rio de Janeiro.

Sebastián won the bronze medal in the C2 event at the 2015 Pan American Games, silver in the C1 event at the 2019 Pan American Games. He won gold in the C1 event at the Pan American Canoe Slalom championships in 2023.

His younger brother Lucas is also a slalom canoeist.

Rossi gained attention during the COVID pandemic, as he trained in his father-in-law's pool.
