= Felipe Borges (canoeist) =

Brazilian canoeist (born 1994)

Personal information
- Full name: Felipe Borges da Silva
- Born: 16 November 1994 (age 31) Foz do Iguaçu, Brazil
- Height: 1.85 m (6 ft 1 in)
- Weight: 72 kg (159 lb)

Sport
- Country: Brazil
- Sport: Canoe slalom
- Event: C1, C2
Medal record
Men's canoe slalom
Representing Brazil
Pan American Games
Bronze medal – third place	2015 Toronto	C1
Bronze medal – third place	2019 Lima	C1
U23 World Championships
Bronze medal – third place	2015 Foz do Iguaçu	C1

Felipe Borges da Silva (born 16 November 1994) is a Brazilian slalom canoeist who has competed at the international level since 2010.

He finished 16th in the C1 event at the 2016 Summer Olympics in Rio de Janeiro.
