= Anderson Oliveira (canoeist) =

Brazilian canoeist

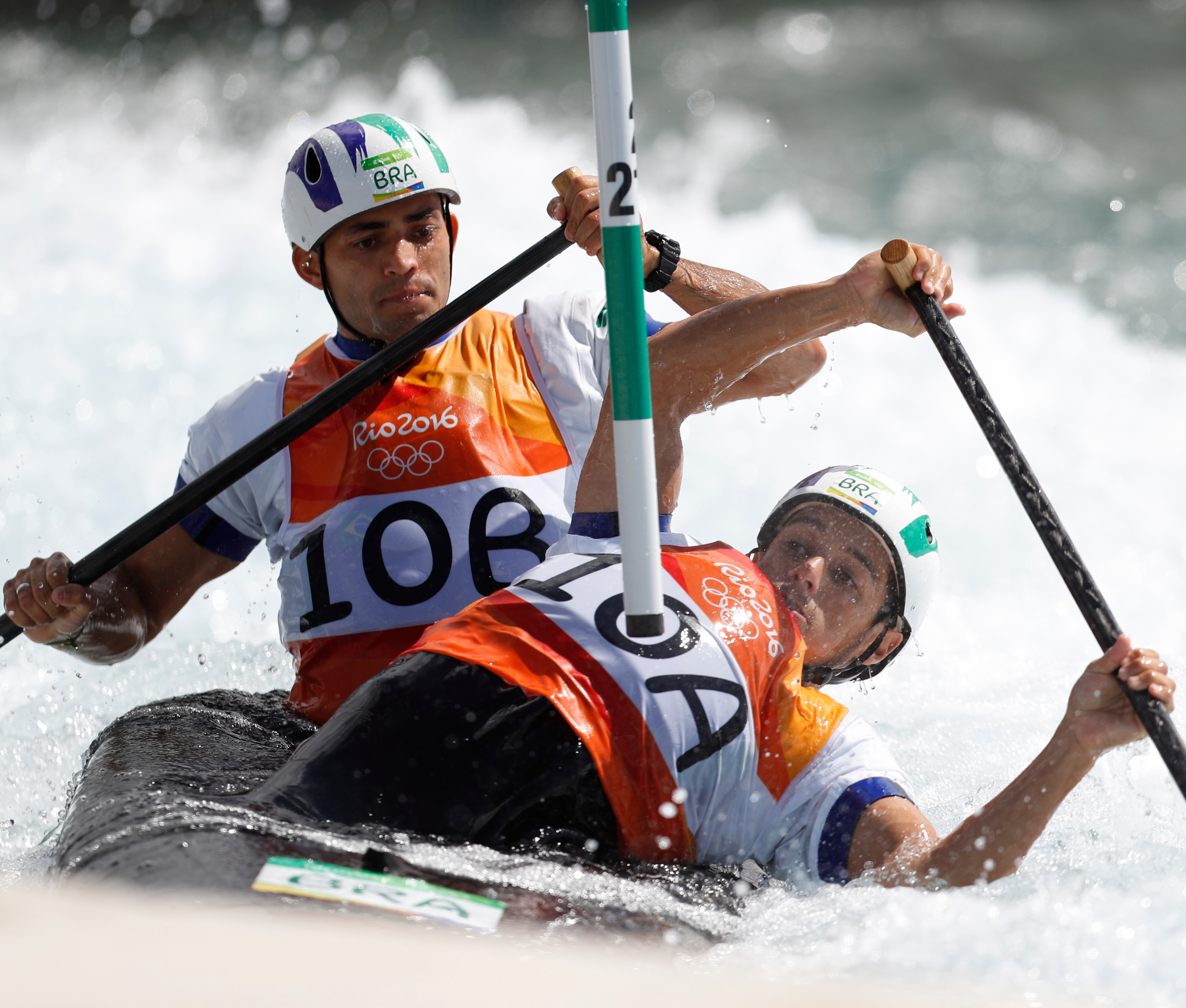
- Oliveira (left) and Corrêa at the 2016 Olympics

Personal information
- Born: 10 January 1992 (age 34) Piraju, Brazil
- Height: 169 cm (5 ft 7 in)
- Weight: 64 kg (141 lb)

Sport
- Sport: Canoe slalom
Medal record
Representing Brazil
Pan American Games
Silver medal – second place	2015 Toronto	C2
U23 World Championships
Bronze medal – third place	2015 Foz do Iguaçu	C2

Anderson dos Santos Oliveira (born 10 January 1992) is a Brazilian slalom canoeist who has competed at the international level since 2011.

Together with Charles Corrêa he won a silver medal at the 2015 Pan American Games. They finished 11th in the C2 event at the 2016 Summer Olympics in Rio de Janeiro.
