= Simon Werro =

Swiss slalom canoeist (born 1989)

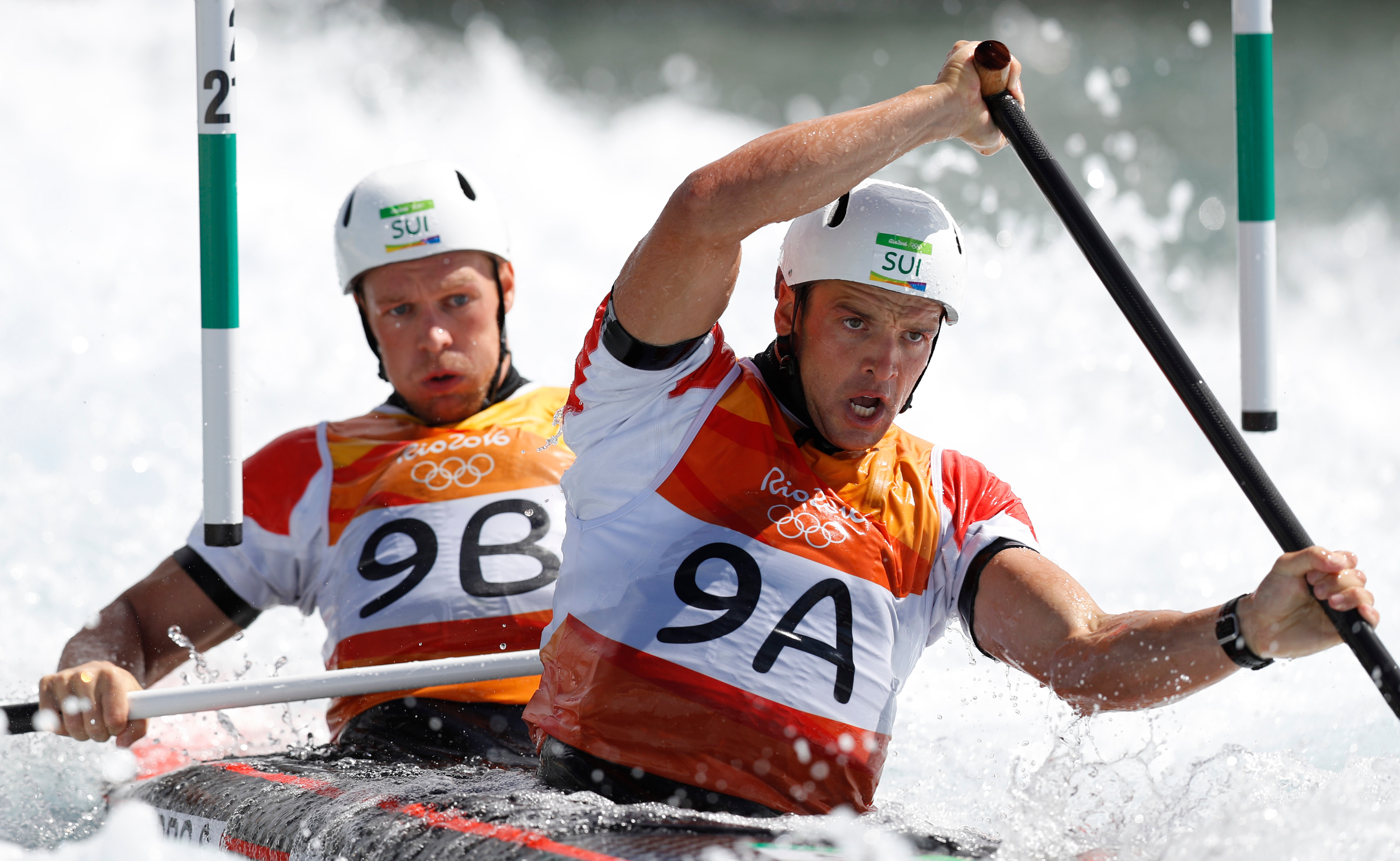
- Simon (left) and Lukas at the 2016 Olympics

Personal information
- Born: 9 December 1989 (age 36)
- Height: 178 cm (5 ft 10 in)
- Weight: 74 kg (163 lb)

Sport
- Sport: Canoe slalom

Simon Werro (born 9 December 1989) is a Swiss slalom canoeist who has competed since 2010. Together with his younger brother Lukas he placed ninth in the slalom doubles (C2) event at the 2016 Summer Olympics in Rio de Janeiro.
