= Lachlan Bassett =

Australian canoeist

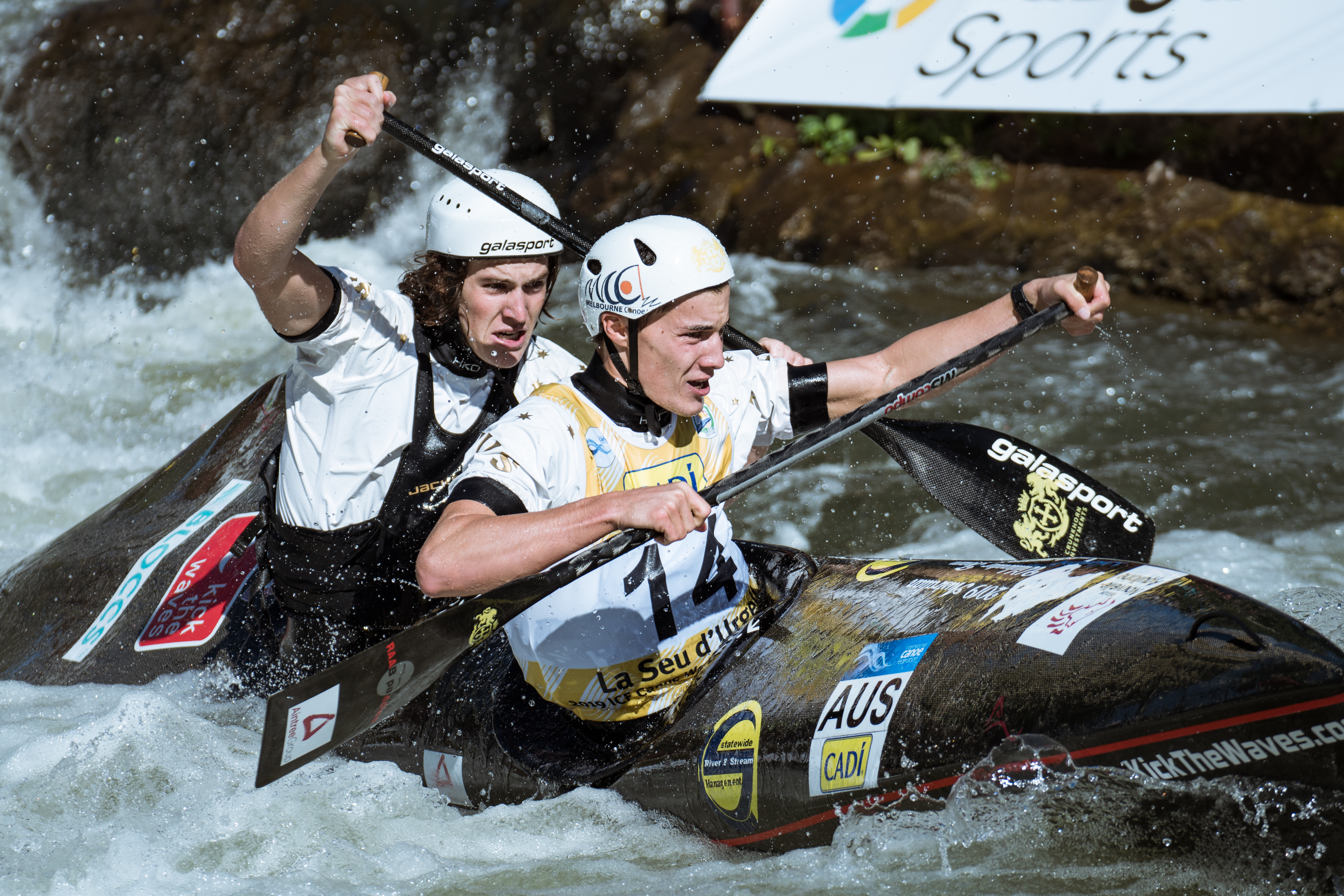

Personal information
- Born: 4 November 1999 (age 26)

Sport
- Country: Australia
- Sport: canoeing

Lachlan Bassett (born 4 November 1999) is an Australian male canoeist who was a finalist at the senior level at the 2018 and 2019 Wildwater Canoeing World Championships.

Lachlan Bassett has also been a Paddle Australia Athlete since 2015 where he competed in his first ICF Wildwater World Championships in the United States as well as a Canoe Slalom world championships in 2016, 2017 and 2020. As well as being on the senior Wildwater World championships team he was a reserve Team member for The 2019 U23 National Canoe Slalom Team and selected for the 2020 U23 Canoe Slalom World championships. Lachlan has come 5th, 6th, 6th, 9th at Two World Championships, as well as coming 30th and 23rd at Canoe Slalom World Championships.

== Results ==
Past Results Wildwater - C2M

- 2015 World Championships Sprint - Bryson City, US - 6th
- 2015 World Championships Classic - Bryson City, US - 5th
- 2017 World Championships Sprint - Murau, Austria- 9th
- 2017 World Championships Classic - Murau, Austria- 6th
- 2018 Wildwater Sprint Grand Prix - Penrith, Australia - 1st
- 2019 Wildwater National Championships Wildwater Classic Race -Tasmania, Australia - 1st
- 2019 Wildwater National Championships Wildwater Sprint Race- Run 1 -Tasmania, Australia - 1st
- 2019 Wildwater National Championships Wildwater Sprint Race- Run 2 -Tasmania, Australia - 1st

Canoe Slalom - C1M

- 2016 World Championships - Krakow, Poland - 30th
- 2017 World Championships - Bratislava, Slovakia - 23rd
- 2018 Australian Open - Sydney, Australia - 24th
- 2019 Senior Canoe Slalom National Championships - Tasmania, Australia- 5th overall 3rd U23
- 2019 Australian Open - Sydney, Australia - 29th
- 2019 Oceania Open - Sydney, Australia - 17th
- 2019 New Zealand Canoe Slalom Nationals - Kawerau, New Zealand - 2nd
