= Timo Trummer =

German canoeist (born 1996)

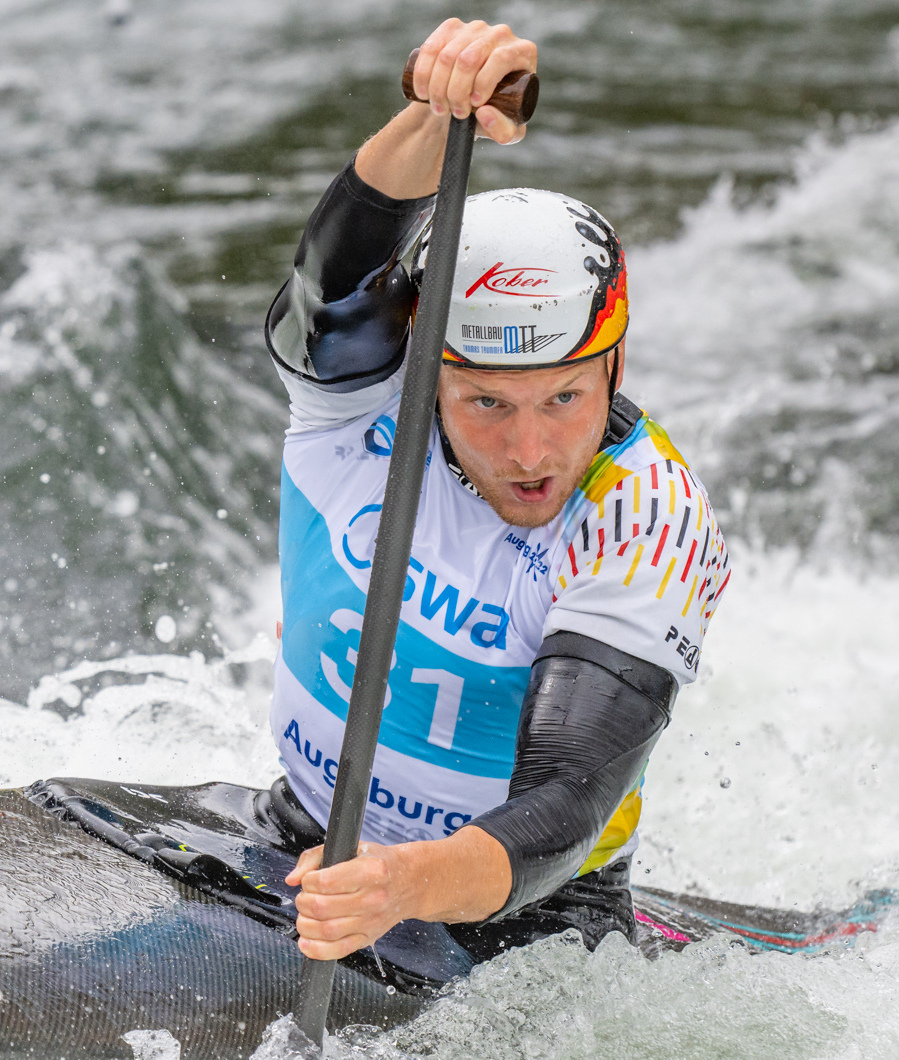
- Trummer in 2022

Personal information
- Born: 15 April 1996 (age 30) Zeitz, Germany

Sport
- Sport: Canoe slalom
- Event: C1
Medal record
Men's Canoe slalom
Representing Germany
World Championships
Bronze medal – third place	2026 Oklahoma City	C1 team
European Games
Gold medal – first place	2023 Kraków	C1 team
European Championships
Gold medal – first place	2022 Liptovský Mikuláš	C1 team
U23 World Championships
Gold medal – first place	2018 Ivrea	C1 team
U23 European Championships
Silver medal – second place	2017 Hohenlimburg	C1 team
Junior European Championships
Gold medal – first place	2014 Skopje	C1 team
Gold medal – first place	2014 Skopje	C2 team

Timo Trummer (born 15 April 1996) is a German slalom canoeist who has competed at the international level since 2014, specializing in the C1 event and the C2 event (earlier in the career).

== Career ==
Trummer competed at the 2023 European Games and won a gold medal in the C1 team event, along with Franz Anton and Sideris Tasiadis.

In July 2026, he competed at the 2026 ICF Canoe Slalom World Championships in Oklahoma City and won a bronze medal in the C1 team event.
