= Kaylen Bassett =

Australian canoeist

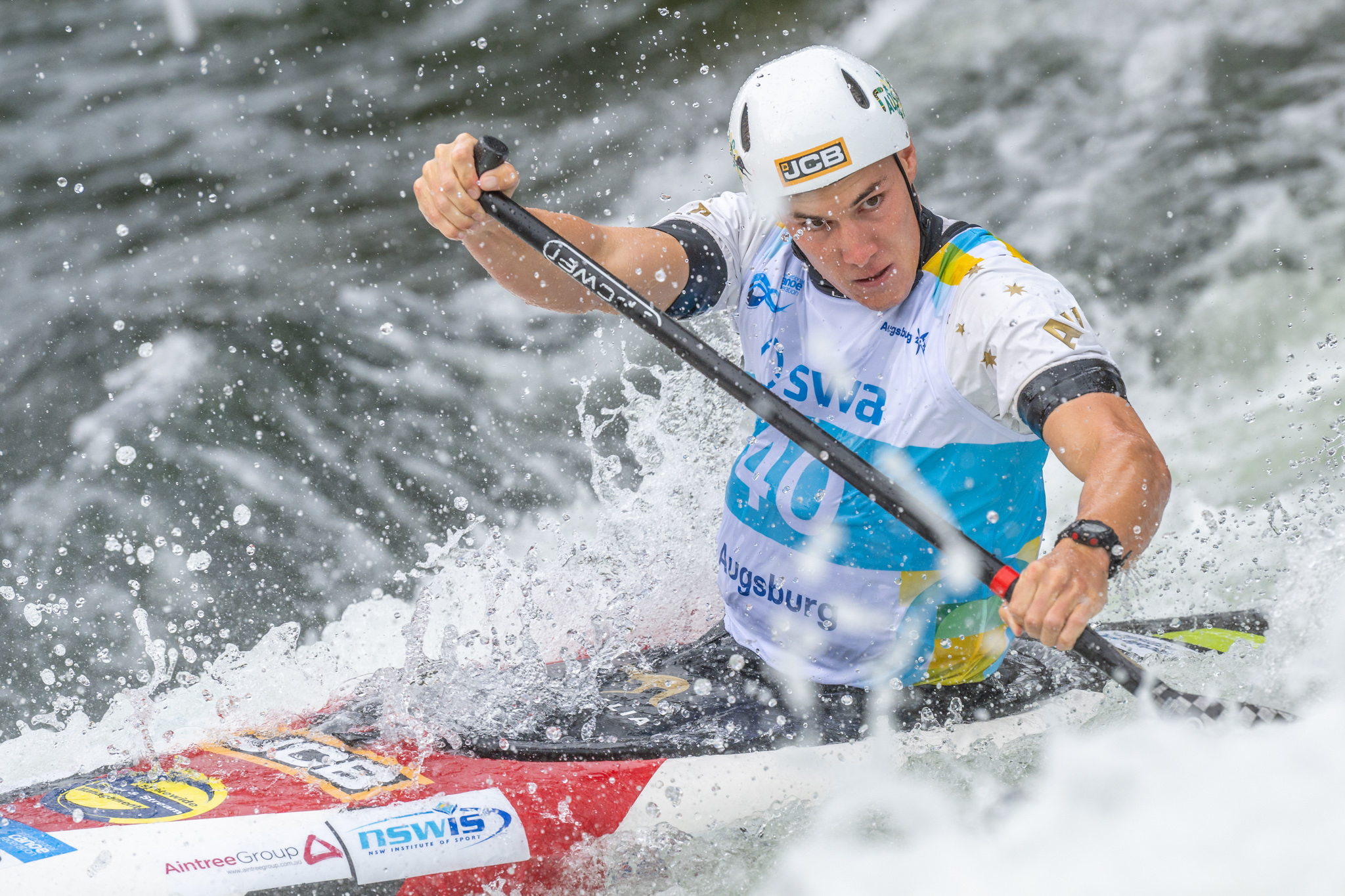
- Kaylen Bassett performing at 2022 ICF Canoe Slalom World Championships in Augsburg, Germany

Personal information
- Born: 17 July 1997 (age 28)
- Website: https://kaylenbassett.com/

Sport
- Country: Australia
- Sport: Canoe slalom, Wildwater canoeing
- Event: C1, Kayak cross
Medal record
Men's canoe slalom
Representing Australia
World Championships
Bronze medal – third place	2025 Penrith	C1
Oceania Championships
Silver medal – second place	2025 Penrith	C1

Kaylen Bassett (born 17 July 1997) is an Australian slalom and wildwater canoeist. He has competed at the international level in canoe slalom since 2021, specializing in C1 and kayak cross.

He won a bronze medal in the C1 event at the 2025 World Championships in Penrith.

He was a finalist at the 2018 and 2019 Wildwater Canoeing World Championships.
