= Zachary Lokken =

American canoeist (born 1994)

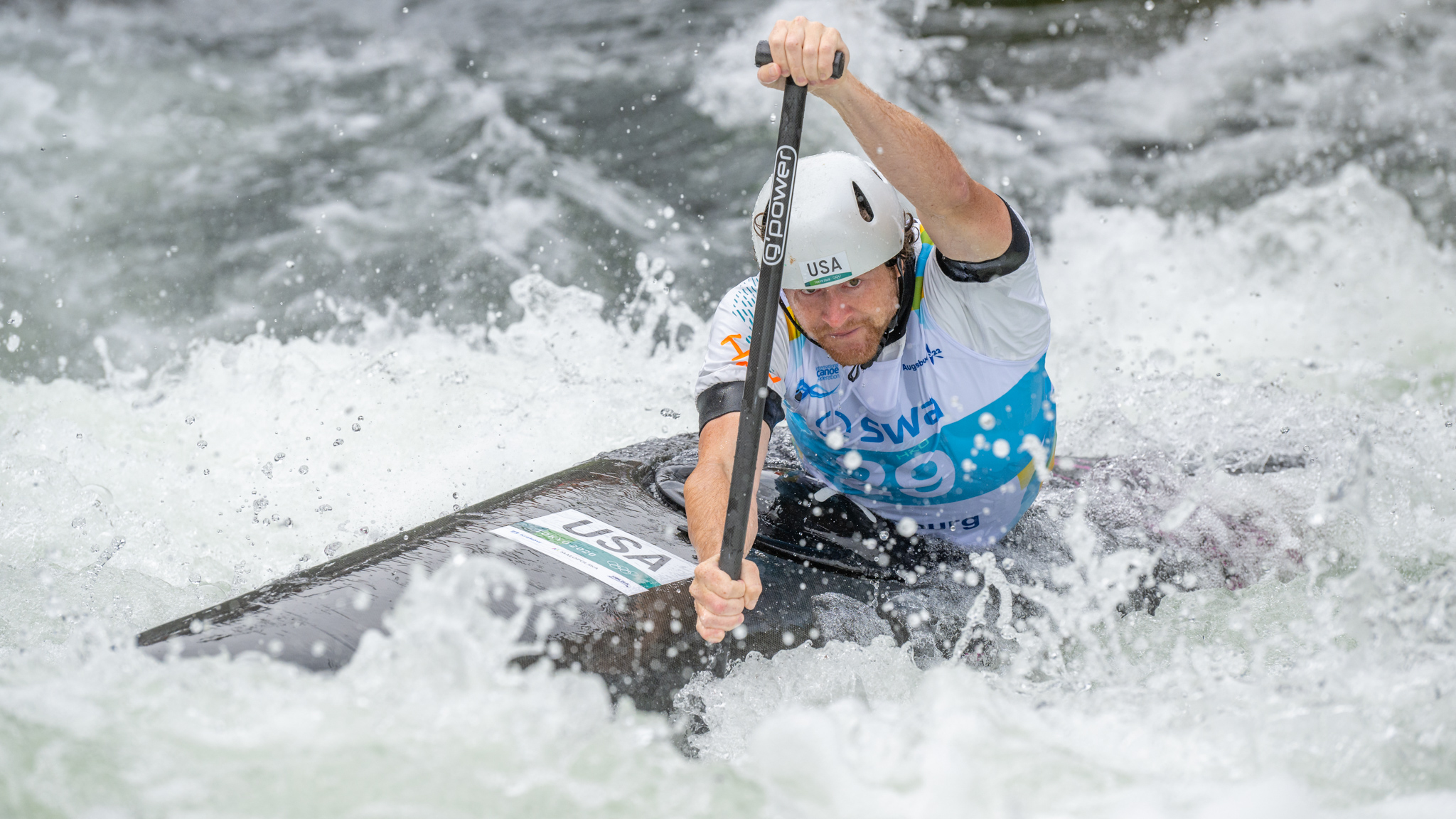
- Zachary Lokken performing at 2022 ICF Canoe Slalom World Championships in Augsburg, Germany

Personal information
- Born: March 25, 1994 (age 32) Durango, Colorado, U.S.
- Height: 5 ft 10 in (178 cm)
- Weight: 160 lb (73 kg)

Sport
- Country: United States
- Sport: Canoe slalom
- Event: C1
- Coached by: Rafal Smolen
Medal record
Men's canoe slalom
Representing United States
Pan American Games
| Gold medal – first place | 2019 Lima | C-1 |
| Gold medal – first place | 2023 Santiago | C-1 |

Zachary Lokken (born March 25, 1994) is an American slalom canoeist who has competed at the international level since 2008. He won the gold medal in the C1 event at the 2019 Pan American Games in Lima, Peru.

He represented the United States at the 2020 Summer Olympics in Tokyo, Japan where he finished 7th in the C1 event.

== World Cup individual podiums ==
| Season | Date | Venue | Position | Event |
|---|---|---|---|---|
| 2009 | 3 Aug 2009 | Kananaskis | 3rd | C1^{1} |
| 2023 | 16 June 2023 | Tacen | 2nd | C1 |

^{1} Pan American Championship counting for World Cup points
