= Casey Eichfeld =

American slalom canoeist (born 1989)

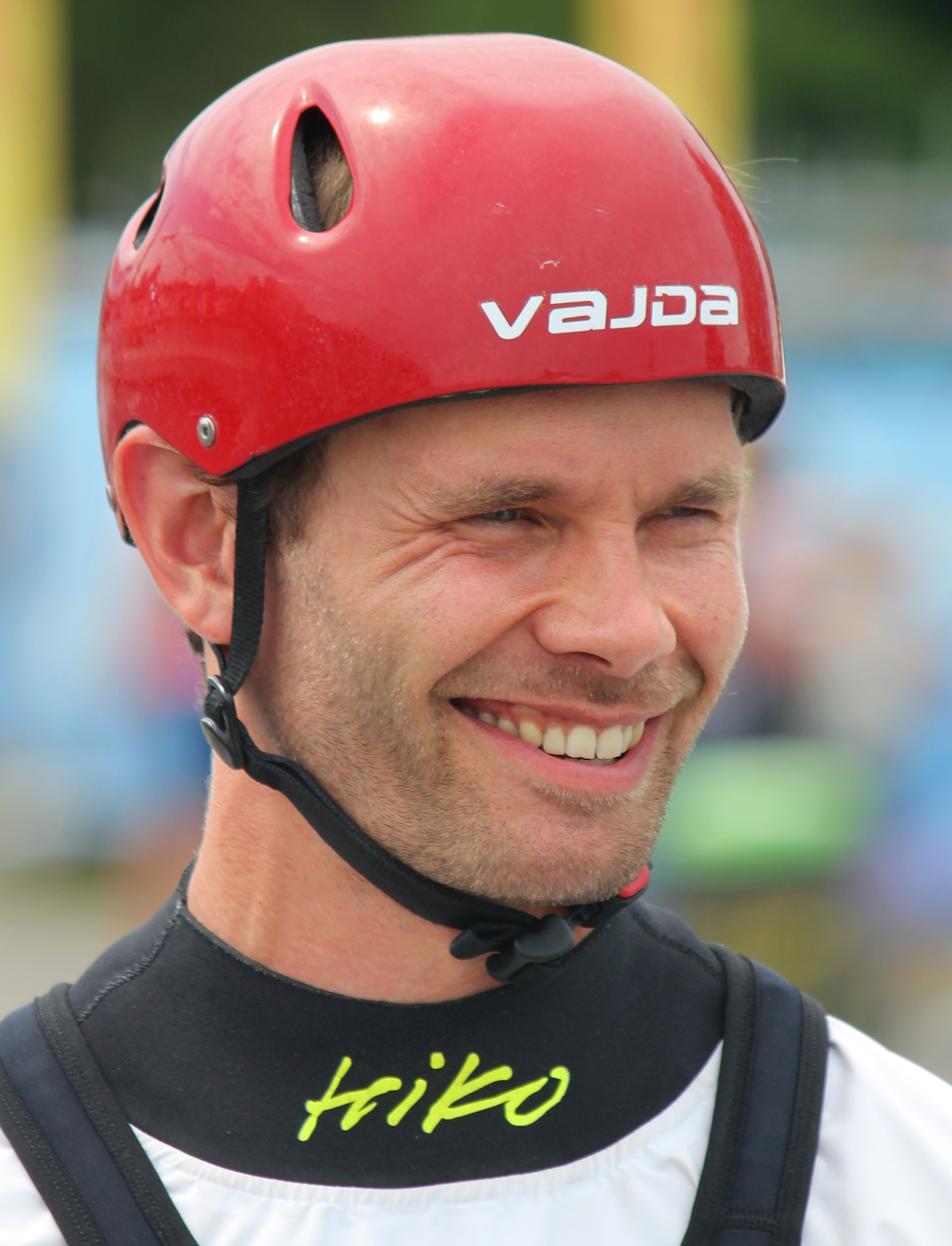
- Eichfeld in 2023

Personal information
- Born: November 15, 1989 (age 36) Harrisburg, Pennsylvania, U.S.
- Education: KeyStone
- Height: 5 ft 10 in (1.78 m)
- Weight: 170 lb (77 kg)

Sport
- Sport: Canoe slalom
- Club: Potomac Whitewater Racing Center
- Coached by: Rafal Smolen
Medal record
Men's canoe slalom
Representing the United States
Pan American Games
Gold medal – first place	2015 Toronto	C1
Gold medal – first place	2015 Toronto	C2

Casey Eichfeld (/ˈaɪkfɛld/ EYEK-feld; born November 15, 1989) is an American slalom canoeist who has competed at the international level since 2004. He won gold medals in single and double canoe at the 2015 Pan American Games. He competed at the 2008, 2012, 2016 and 2024 Summer Olympics with the best result of seventh place in the C1 event in 2016. At the world championships his best achievement is fourth place in C1 in 2015.

== Early life ==
Eichfeld was born to Steve and Kathy Eichfeld. He has a sister Erin and a brother Devon. He trained in dancing for seven years to improve balance and flexibility. Eichfeld took up canoeing aged 5; by the age of 8 he competed nationally and was a member of the national cadet team, and by 14 took part in international competitions.

== Career ==
He and teammate Rick Powell were eliminated in the qualifying round of the C2 event at the 2008 Summer Olympics, finishing 11th. Eichfeld placed 14th in the C1 event at the 2012 Olympics. At the 2016 Rio Games, he finished 7th in the C1 event and 10th in the C2 event, with Devin McEwan. He also competed at the 2024 Summer Olympics in Paris, finishing 16th in the C1 event and 37th in kayak cross.

On September 10, 2016, Eichfeld earned his first career medal in a major global race, when he took home bronze in the C1 event at the ICF Canoe Slalom World Cup Final in Tacen, Slovenia.

In the C2 class he paddled with Rick Powell from 2006 to 2008. From 2011 to 2016 he was partnered by Devin McEwan.

== World Cup individual podiums ==
Season	Date	Venue	Position	Event
2006	August 20, 2006	Madawaska	2nd	C1^{1}
2008	April 26, 2008	Charlotte	3rd	C2^{1}
2016	September 10, 2016	Tacen	3rd	C1

^{1} Pan American Championship counting for World Cup points
