= List of artificial whitewater courses =

The first whitewater slalom race took place on the Aar River in Switzerland in 1933. The early slalom courses were all set in natural rivers, but when whitewater slalom became an Olympic sport for the first time, at the 1972 Munich Games, the venue was the world's first concrete-channel artificial whitewater course, the Eiskanal in Augsburg. All Olympic whitewater slalom competitions have taken place in artificial courses, which now exist in 16 countries on five continents.

Streambed slalom courses still outnumber concrete channels, but most international competition takes place in the more controlled environment of an artificial course. The standard parameters for such a course, patterned on the Olympic model, are a length of about 300 metres (980 ft), a slope of 2% (20 m/km [110 ft/mi]), and a flow rate of 17 cubic metres per second (600 cu ft/s). Within those parameters, designs vary. Water diversion features can be natural rocks, shaped concrete boulders and wing dams, plastic bollards, wooden dams, or truck tires. Channel walls can be straight or slanted, and smooth or cobbled. The floor of the channel may have raised turbulence generators to slow the water speed. The course may be a single straight channel, parallel channels, one or more loops, or a figure-8.

Map

Water can be supplied by diversion from a nearby river, tidal current, electric pumps, or a combination. The expense of operation is largely dependent on the water source. A single channel on the Olympic model — a six-metre (20 ft) drop at 17 m³/s — represents one megawatt of energy, either supplied by pumps or sacrificed in the case of diversion around a hydroelectric generator. Ironically, diversion is often more expensive than pumping if the diverted water would have made a bigger drop inside the hydroelectric facility. The extreme example of this is the Ocoee Whitewater Center where water must bypass a 96-metre (315 ft) drop in a dam, tunnel, and penstock, in order to water the 9-meter drop of the whitewater course.

Most artificial whitewater courses cover their operating costs by charging passengers for guided raft rides. Canoe and kayak slalom training and competition do not generate enough revenue.

The four riverbed courses on this list are all extensively engineered and used for major competitions. Ocoee is no longer used for slalom, but it was the 1996 Olympic venue. The other courses on the list have concrete channels, often built in former industrial canals or mill races. Every city that hosts a summer Olympics is now expected to build a new whitewater stadium, usually powered by electric pumps. The Lee Valley White Water Centre, constructed for the London 2012 Summer Olympics, cost £31million.

In the table below, the location of each facility for which there is no Wikipedia article is noted in the Comment column. If the facility is more than two years old, there is often a good satellite or aerial (bird's eye) picture available via the link.

Artificial whitewater canoe/kayak slalom courses — grouped by country — listed by completion date
						Slope	Streamflow	
Date	Course name	Location	Water source	Power source	Shape	ft/mi (m/km)	cu ft/s (m³/s)	Comment
Australia
2000	Penrith Whitewater Stadium	Penrith	Penrith Lakes	Pumped	Loop	91 (17)	494 (14)	33.7205°S 150.6835°E2000 Olympics Sydney
1974	Brady's Lake Slalom Course	Bradys Lake, Tasmania	Bronte Lagoon	Dam release, Natural modified	Riverbed	106 (20)	918 (26)	42.2286°S 146.4945°E
Austria
2013	Vienna Watersports Arena	Vienna	New Danube	Pumped	Loop	79 (15)	424 (12)	48.1934°N 16.4619°E
Brazil
2006	Itaipu Slalom Course	Foz do Iguaçu	Itaipu Lake, Paraná River	Flow diversion & Pumped	Loop	115 (22)	441 (13)	25.432°S 54.581°W
2015	Deodoro Olympic Whitewater Stadium	Rio de Janeiro	city water	Pumped	2 Loops	95 (18)	420 (12)	22.8486°S 43.4026°W2016 Olympics Rio de Janeiro
Canada
–	Canoe Meadows Race Course	Kananaskis	Kananaskis River	Dam release, Natural modified	Linear	–	(27–31) Normal	51.054965°N 115.018834°W
–	Minden Wild Water Preserve	Minden, Ontario	Gull River	Dam release, Natural modified	Riverbed, Maintained	–	825–1650 (25–50)	2015 Pan-Am Games
–	Pumphouse Tailrace	Ottawa	Ottawa River	Flow diversion	Linear	–	–	45.417°N 75.711°W
–	Rutherford Whitewater Park	Whistler	Rutherford Creek	Flow diversion	Linear	–	–	50.274°N 122.867°W
China
2004	Whitewater Stadium of Nanjing	Nanjing	Xuanwu Lake	Pumped	Loop	79 (15)	565 (16)	32.065°N 118.81°E
2007	Shunyi Rowing-Canoeing Park	Shunyi	Chaobai River	Pumped	Loop	110 (21)	–	40.1737°N 116.6866°E2008 Olympics Beijing
2007	Xiasi Canoe Slalom Course	Xiasi	Qingshui River	Flow diversion	Linear	102 (19)	424 (12)	26.527°N 107.804°E
2007	Rizhao Canoe Slalom Course	Rizhao	Rizhao Harbor	Pumped	Loop	–	–	35.418°N 119.561°E
	Miyi Canoe Slalom Training Base	Miyi	Peace River	Flow diversion	Linear	119 (23)	494 (14)	26.906°N 102.117°E
Czech Republic
1983	Prague-Troja Canoeing Centre	Prague-Troja	Vltava	Flow diversion	Linear	63 (12)	565 (16)	50.113°N 14.425°E
–	České Vrbné Slalom Course	České Budějovice	Vltava	Flow diversion	Linear	–	–	49.013°N 14.452°E
1984	Veltrusy Slalom Course	Veltrusy	Vltava	Flow diversion	Linear	53.50 (10)	353 (10)	50.277°N 14.315°E
–	Trnávka Slalom Course	Želiv	Trnava	Flow diversion	Linear	86(16)	424(12)	49.524°N 15.219°E
–	Roudnice nad Labem	Roudnice nad Labem	Elbe	Flow diversion	Linear	–	–	50.429°N 14.260°E
–	USD Opava	Opava	Opava (river)	Flow diversion	Linear	–	–	49.9577°N 17.8856°E
Proposed	Zdiměřice Whitewater Park	Zdiměřice		Pumped	Loop	–	–	49.988°N 14.528°E
France
1988	Épinal Slalom Course	Épinal	Moselle River	Flow diversion	Linear	–	–	48.173°N 6.446°E
1992	Lannion Whitewater Stadium	Lannion	Leguer River	Flow diversion, Tidal	Linear	47 (9)	530 (15)	48.729°N 3.459°W
1992	Parc des Eaux Vives	Huningue	Rhine River	Flow diversion	Loop	75 (14)	353 (10)	47.590°N 7.582°E
1993	L'Argentière-la-Bessée	L'Argentière-la-Bessée	Durance River	Natural flow	Riverbed	47 (9)	2470 (70)	44.780°N 6.560°E
1996	St Laurent Whitewater Stadium	St Laurent	Scarpe River	Gravity, Pumped	Linear	86 (16)	424 (12)	50.298°N 2.804°E
1997	Bourg-Saint-Maurice	Bourg-Saint-Maurice	Isère River	Dam release	Riverbed	184 (35)	883 (25)	45.603°N 6.766°E
1997	Nancy Whitewater Stadium	Nancy	Meurthe River	Flow diversion	Linear	72 (14)	706 (20)	48.694°N 6.201°E
1999	Cesson-Sévigné Whitewater Stadium	Cesson-Sévigné	Vilaine River	Gravity, Pumped	V-shape	39 (7)	424 (12)	48.115°N 1.607°W
2000	Cergy Whitewater Stadium	Cergy	Oise River	Pumped	Loop	103 (20)	565 (16)	49.029°N 2.052°E
2000	Millau Whitewater Course	Millau	Tarn River	Flow diversion	Linear	31.5 (6)	565 (16)	44.0934°N 3.079°E
–	Saint-Pierre-de-Bœuf-Paradise	Saint-Pierre-de-Bœuf	Rhône River	Flow diversion	Linear	–	–	45.379°N 4.7554°E
–	Isle de la Serre	Sault-Brénaz	Rhône River	Flow diversion	S-shape	–	–	45.849°N 5.414°E
–	Slalom Ardèche	Vallon-Pont-d'Arc	Ardèche River	Flow diversion	Linear	–	–	44.399°N 4.385°E
2008	Pau-Pyrénées Whitewater Stadium	Pau	Gave de Pau	Flow diversion	Loop	94 (18)	494 (14)	43.286°N 0.358°W
2008	Châteauneuf Whitewater Sports	Châteauneuf-sur-Cher	Cher River	Diversion, Pumped	110 meter Loop	58 (11)	459 (13)	46.856°N 2.320°E
2013	Sainte Suzanne Whitewater Stadium	Sainte Suzanne, Réunion Island	Sainte Suzanne River	Pumped	250 meter loop	63 (12)	420 (12)	20.913°S 55.615°E
2019	Vaires-sur-Marne Nautical Stadium	Vaires-sur-Marne	Marne River	Pumped	300 meter Loop			48.8636°N 2.6240°E2024 Olympics Paris
2022	Base Nautique: Natur'O Vive	Épinal	Moselle River	Pumped	S-shape	79 (15)	420 (12)	48.186°N 6.443°E
Germany
1971	Augsburg Eiskanal	Augsburg	Lech River	Flow diversion	Linear	79 (15)	353 (10)	48.349°N 10.9366°E1972 Olympics Munich
2006	Kanupark Markkleeberg	Leipzig	Markkleeberger See	Pumped	2 Loops	111 (21)	494 (14)	51.258°N 12.427°E
Greece
2004	Heleniko Whitewater Stadium	Athens	Gulf of Athens	Pumped	Figure-8	–	618 (18)	37.901°N 23.735°E2004 Olympics Athens
2008	Evinos River Slalom Course	Nafpaktos	Evinos River	Diversion	520 meter Linear	53 (10)	530 (15)	38.454°N 21.708°E
Italy
2007	Ivrea Whitewater Stadium	Ivrea	Dora Baltea River	Flow diversion	Linear	168 (32)	706 (20)	45.464°N 7.875°E
Japan
2019	Kasai Canoe Slalom Centre	Tokyo		Pumped	Linear/Lift	103 (20)	424 (12)	35.643°N 139.855°E2021 Olympics Tokyo
Macedonia
	Skopje Slalom Canoeing Center	Skopje	Treska	In stream, Dam release	Linear			41.958°N 21.296°E
Mexico
	Union de Tula	Union de Tula	Rio Ayuquila	Dam Release	Altered stream			19.960°N 104.371°W
New Zealand
27 April 2016	Vector Wero Whitewater Park	Wiri, Auckland, New Zealand		Pumped		79 (15)		36.998°S 174.888°E
Poland
2003	Krakow-Kolna Canoe Slalom Course	Kraków	Vistula River	Diversion	Linear	–	–	50.032°N 19.825°E
1995	Wietrznice Water Sports Centre	Zabrzeż	Dunajec River	Dam release	Linear			
Russia
2008	Okulovka Whitewater Canal	Okulovka, Novgorod Oblast	Peretna River	Dam release, Natural modified	S-shape	100 (10)	309 (30)	58.411°N 33.2965°E
Slovakia
1978	Ondrej Cibak Whitewater Slalom Course	Liptovský Mikuláš	Vah River	Diversion	Parallel Linear	113 (21)	530 (15)	49.074°N 19.619°E
1996	Čunovo Water Sports Centre	Bratislava	Danube River	Dam release	2 Loops	98 (19)	777 (22)	48.030°N 17.230°E
Slovenia
1990	Tacen Whitewater Course	Ljubljana	Sava River	Dam Spillway, Tailrace	Linear	–	989 (28)	46.1169°N 14.4577°E
Spain
1991	Segre Olympic Park	La Seu d'Urgell	Segre River	Flow diversion, Pumped	2 Loops	114 (22)	618 (17.5)	42.355033°N 1.463278°E 1992 Olympics Barcelona
2008	El Canal de Aguas Bravas	Zaragoza	Ebro River	Pumped	Loop	101 (19)	424 (12)	Expo 2008
2012	Parc del Mig Segre	Ponts	Segre River	Dam release, Natural flow	Linear	13 (4)	1272 (36)	41.9228°N 1.1829°E 300-meter course
Sweden
2019	Falu Vildvattenpark	Falun	[[]]	Pumped				60.591709°N 15.646838°E
United Arab Emirates
2012	Al Ain Adventure	Al Ain		Pumped	3 loops			24.096°N 55.740°E
United Kingdom
1981	Canolfan Tryweryn	Bala, Gwynedd	Llyn Celyn / Afon Tryweryn	Dam release	Riverbed	–	350 (10)	52.94705°N 3.65137°W 1000-meter course
1982	Cardington Slalom Course	Bedford	River Great Ouse	Flow diversion	Linear	60 (11)	530 (15)	52.127061°N 0.428897°W 150-meter course
1986	Holme Pierrepont National Watersports Centre	Nottingham	River Trent	Flow diversion	Linear	30 (5.7)	883 (25)	52.94569°N 1.09074°W 500-meter course
1999	Nene Whitewater Centre	Northampton	River Nene	Flow diversion, Pumped	Loop	–	–	52.2285°N 0.8684°W 300-meter course
1995	Tees Barrage International White Water Course	Stockton-on-Tees	River Tees	Flow diversion, Pumped	Loop	53 (10)	353 (10)	54.56545°N 1.28565°W 250-meter course
2010	Cardiff International White Water	Cardiff	fully enclosed	Pumped	1½ Loops		565 (16)	51.44864°N 3.18186°W 250-meter course
2010	Lee Valley White Water Centre	London	Groundwater	Pumped	2 Loops	88 (17)	460 (13)	2012 Olympics London
2014	Pinkston Watersports	Glasgow	Forth and Clyde Canal	Pumped	2 Loops	79 (15)	247 (7)	55.873°N 4.249°W 100-meter course
United States
1984	East Race Waterway	South Bend IN	St. Joseph River	Flow diversion	Linear	33 (6)	500 (14)	41.676°N 86.245°W
1991	Dickerson Whitewater Course	Dickerson MD	Potomac River	Pumped	Linear	91 (17)	600 (17)	Heated water
1996	Ocoee Whitewater Center	Ducktown TN	Ocoee River	Dam release	Riverbed	99 (19)	1560 (44)	35.068°N 84.463°W1996 Olympics Atlanta
2001	Lock 32 Whitewater Park	Pittsford, New York	Erie Canal	Diversion	Linear			43.09049°N 77.5456506°W
2006	U.S. National Whitewater Center	Charlotte NC	city tap water	Pumped	2 Loops	113 (21)	550 (16)	35.2724°N 81.0051°W
2007	Adventure Sports Center International	McHenry MD	Deep Creek Lake	Pumped	Loop	91 (17)	550 (16)	
2010	Marge Cline Whitewater Course	Yorkville, IL	Fox River	Flow Diversion	Linear			41.6427°N 88.4431°W
2016	Riversport Rapids	Oklahoma City OK	city tap water	Pumped	2 Loops	–		35.457924°N 97.502494°W2028 Olympics Los Angeles
1974	Wausau Whitewater Park	Wausau WI	Wisconsin River	Dam Release	River Bed	–	650	44.957495°N 89.633055°W
2023	Montgomery Whitewater	Montgomery, AL	Man made reservoir	Pumped	Dual Channel Whitewater Course and Flat Water			
Note: Slope and Streamflow numbers refer only to the 300-meter section used for Olympic-style slalom training and competition.
