= Tees Barrage International White Water Course =

Sports venue in Stockton-on-Tees, England

- Teesside White Water course
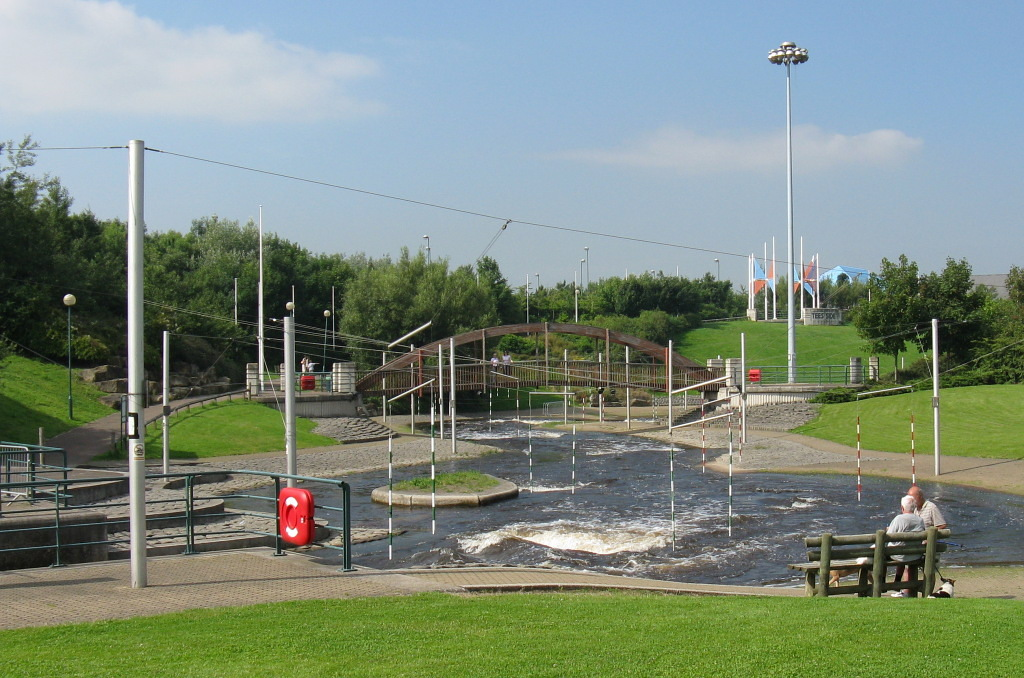
- Upper settling pool of the Tees Barrage International White Water Course (2008)

About
- Locale: Stockton-on-Tees
- Coordinates: 54°33′55.62″N 1°17′8.34″W
- Road access: via A66 in Thornaby-on-Tees
- Maintained by: British Waterways
- Managing agent: Tees Active Limited
- Main shape: loop
- Adjustable: yes, via RapidBlocs
- Water source: Tees Barrage on the River Tees
- Pumped: optional
- Flow diversion: optional
- Class: 1 – 3 (4)
- Practice pool: flatwater course
- Surf wave: yes
- Lighting: Flood and spot-lights
- Facilities: day and overnight
- Construction: 1991–1995
- Opening date: 22 April 1995
- Date upgraded: 2010–2011

Stats
- Loops: Two, one long and one short
- Length: Long: 250 metres (820 ft); Short: 95 metres (312 ft)
- Width: 7 metres (23 ft)
- Drop: 3.7 metres (12 ft)
- Slope: Long: 78 ft/mi (1.5%); Short: 205 ft/mi (3.9%)
- Flowrate: 14 m^{3}/s (494 ft^{3}/s)

The Tees Barrage International White Water Course, originally the Teesside White Water Course, is an artificial whitewater course on the north bank of the River Tees, in northern England. It is part of the Tees Barrage and is located in the Stockton-on-Tees district, accessible by road only from Thornaby-on-Tees and best accessed by the A66. The course was built in 1995 at a cost of £2 million. The course is now open once more under the new name TBIWWC (Tees Barrage International White Water Centre).

== Facilities ==
The course is owned by the Canal & River Trust but administered by Tees Active from the on-site watersports centre. The white water facility offers kayaking, whitewater slalom, playboating and white water rafting plus surfing on the 'surf wave'.

The centre's facilities include a high ropes course, a placid practice pool; watersports centre, shop and cafe; car parking, camping, picnicking and caravanning areas; bandstand and landscaped amphitheatre, The Talpore pub, a restaurant and hotel. The course itself is a U-shaped loop, 250 m long, 7 m wide with a 3.7 m drop and a flow of 14 cumecs (m^{3}/s). The immediate environs of the white water course include the Teesdale Way cycle path (National Cycle Network), the River Tees, the Tees Barrage and the placid grade A two star waters of the river Tees; the David Lloyd Leisure racquet centre, a superstore and Portrack Marsh Nature Reserve.

== Operation ==
The state of the course can depend on the level of the tide in the River Tees. The course can operate by flow diversion for two or three hours either side of low tide but can operate at any time when the pumps are used. The course can operate all year round and in hours of darkness when it is flood-lit, and spot-lit on the two footbridges.

=== Photo gallery (2008) ===
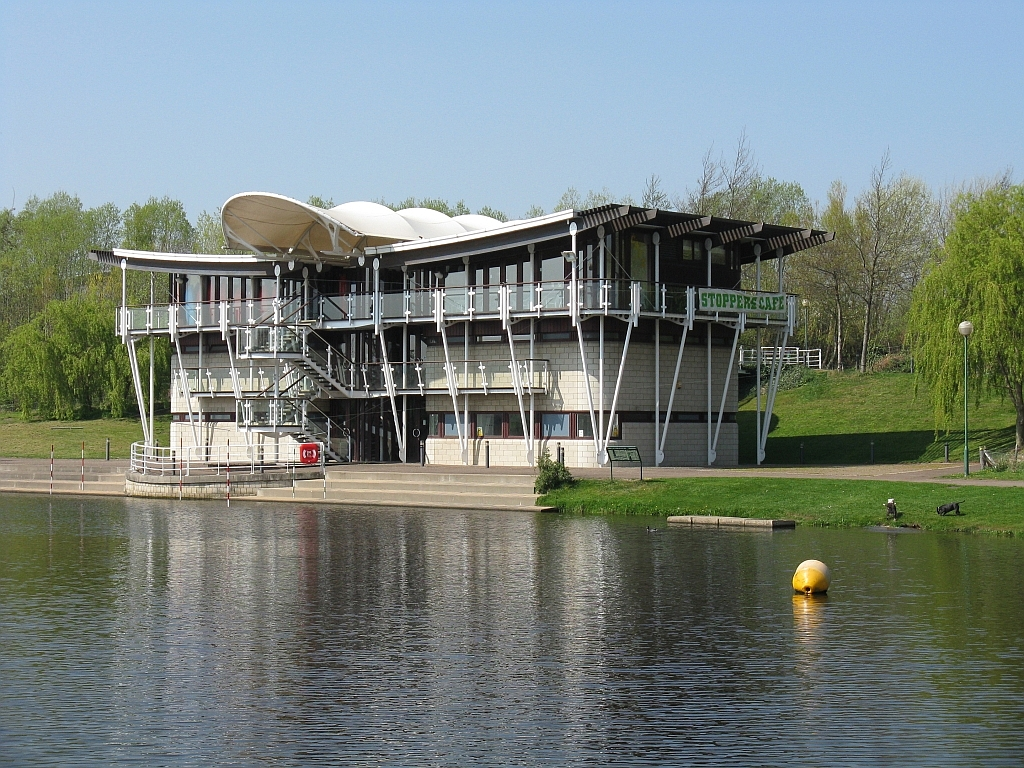
Tees Barrage White Water Course Centre and practice/warm up pool

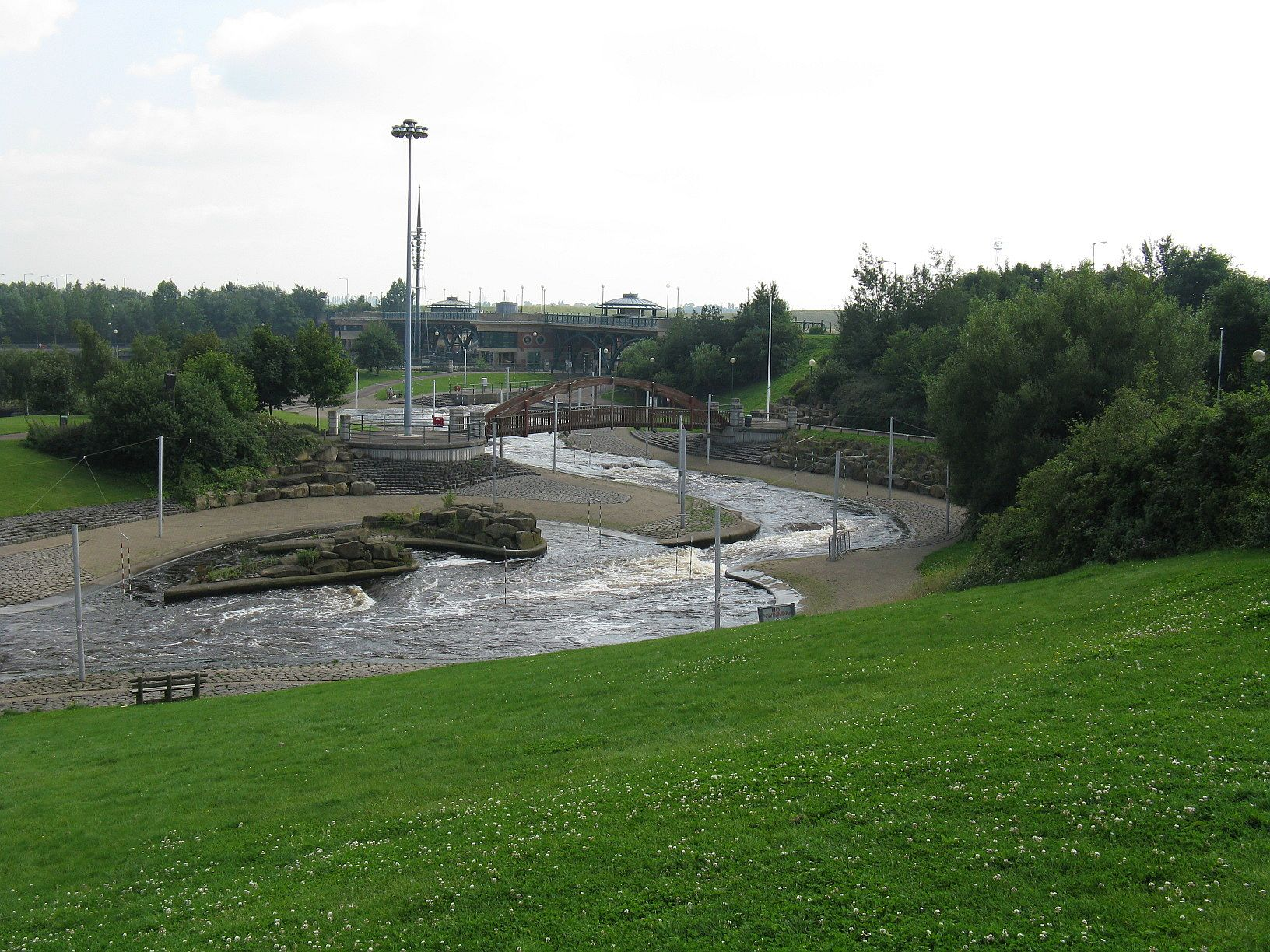
Happy Eater pool

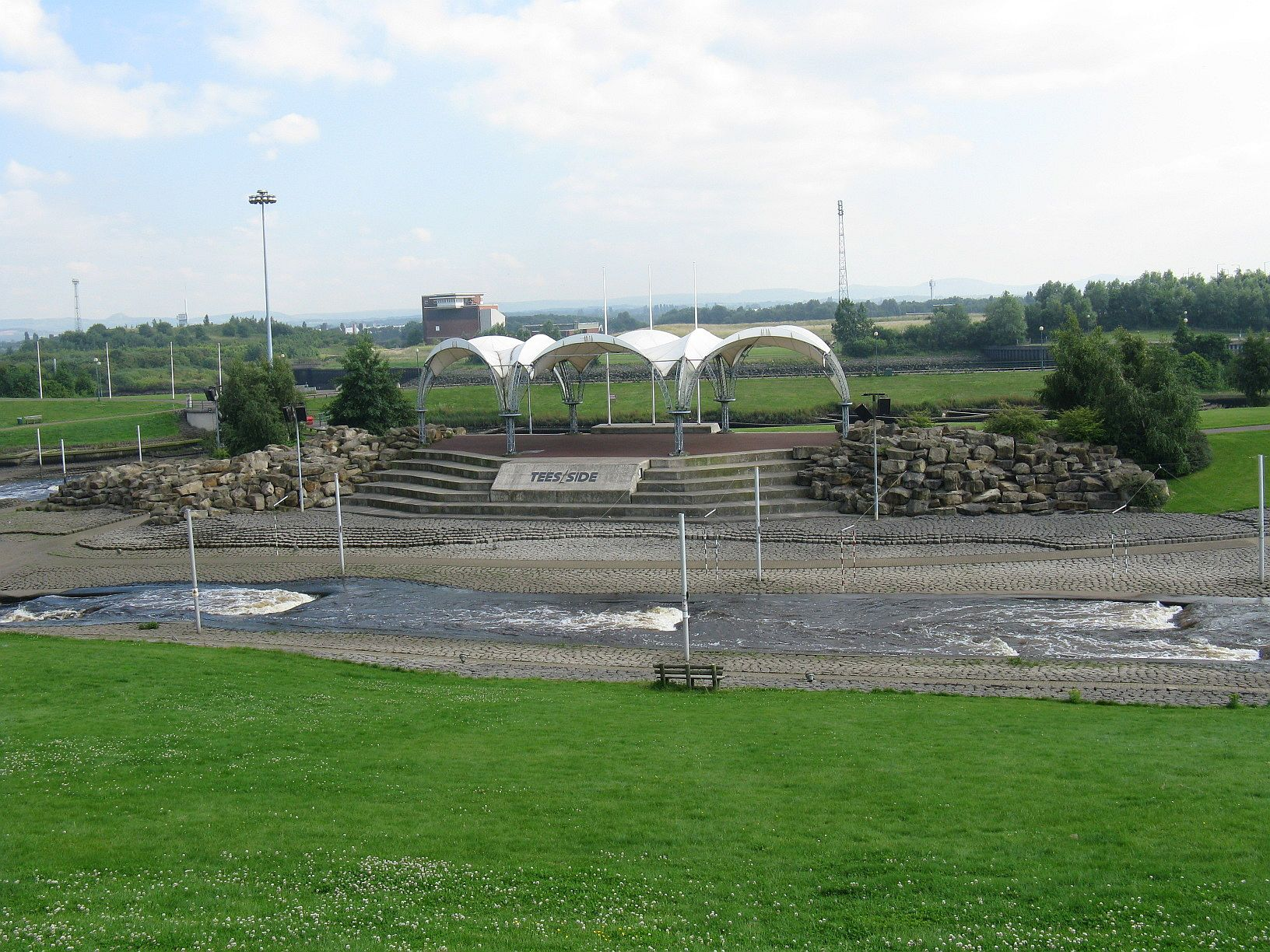
Rapids in front of the bandstand

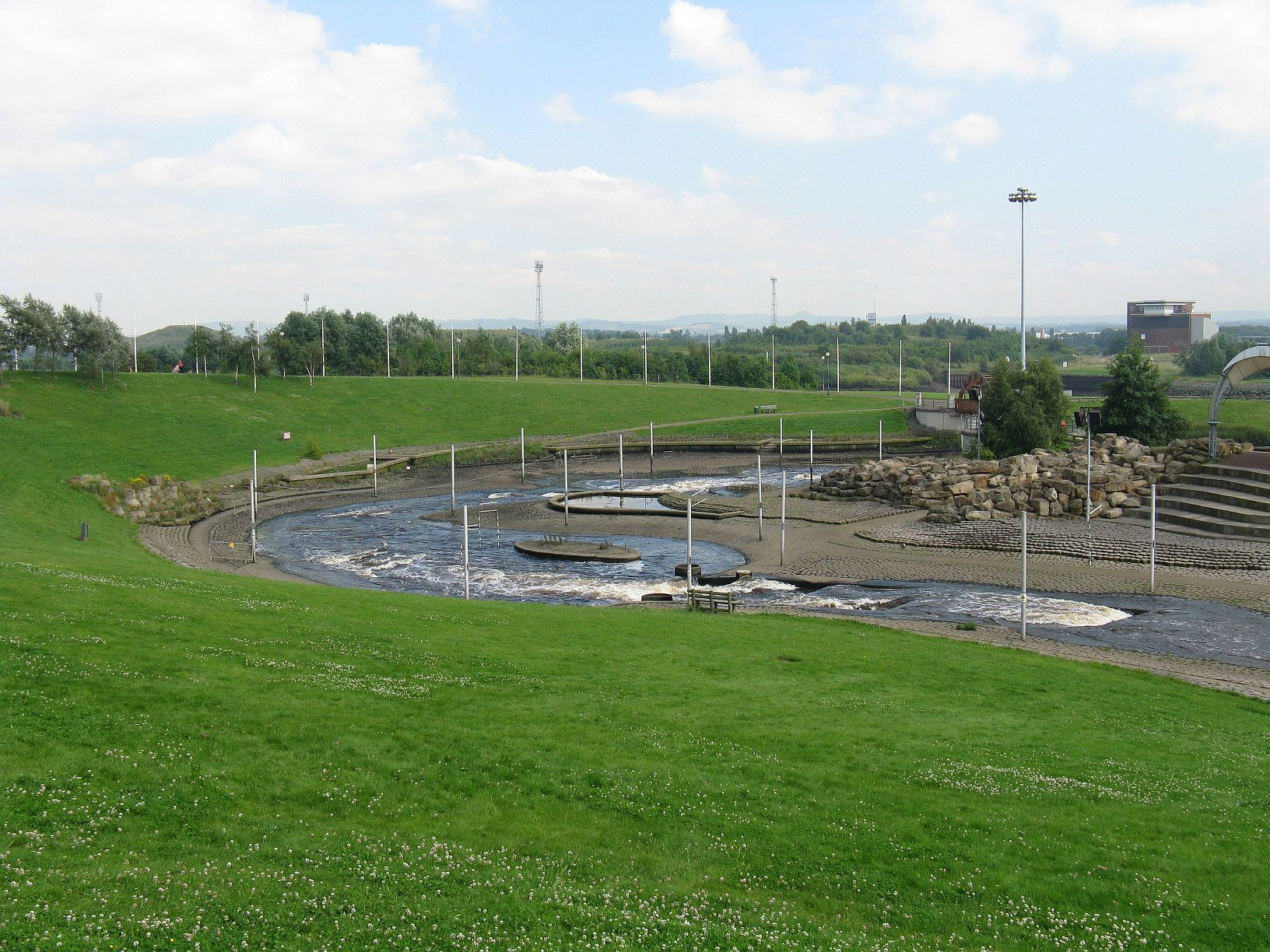
Cruncher pool

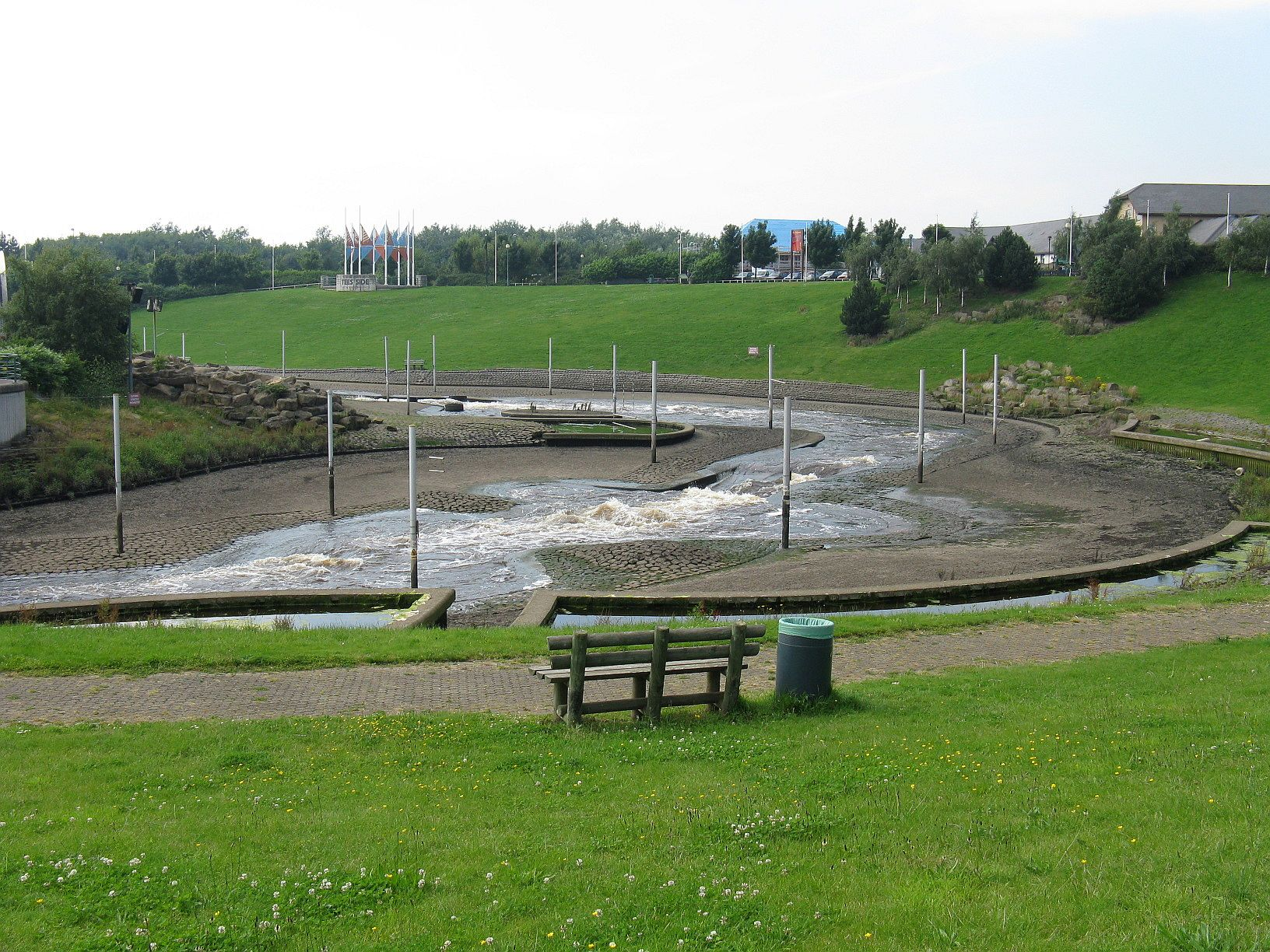
Valentines pool

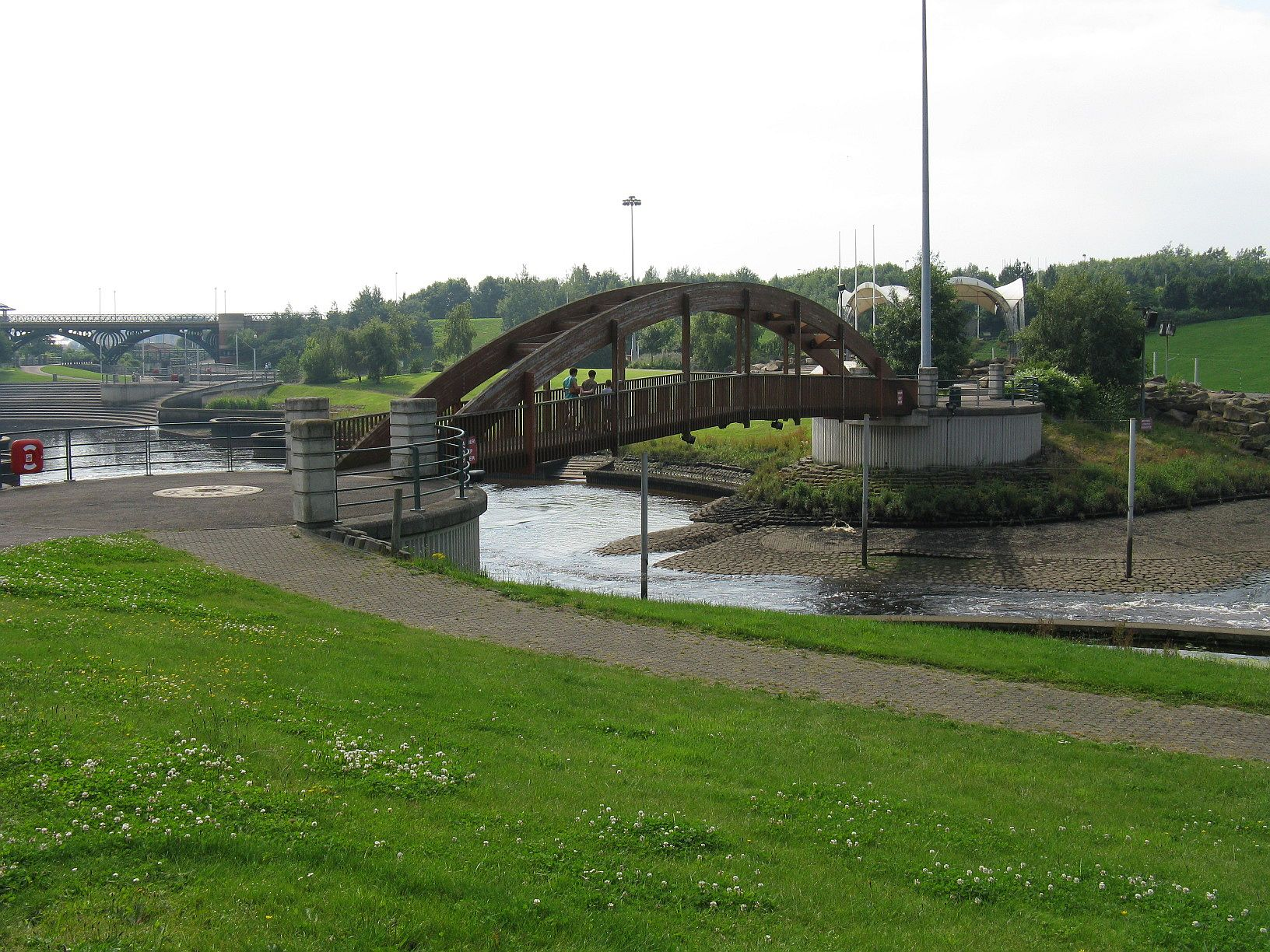
Pedestrian bridge and final rapids

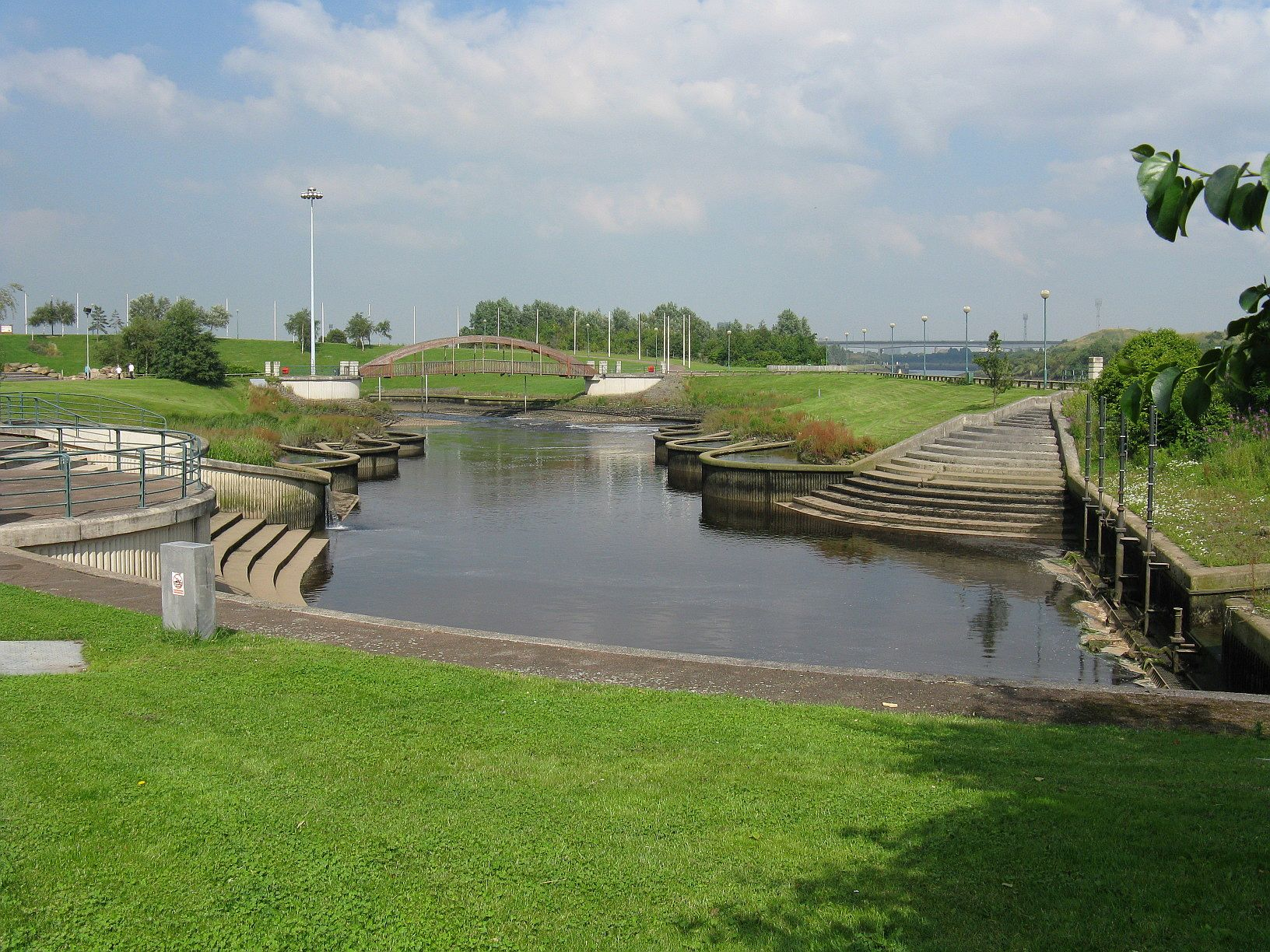
Lower settling pool

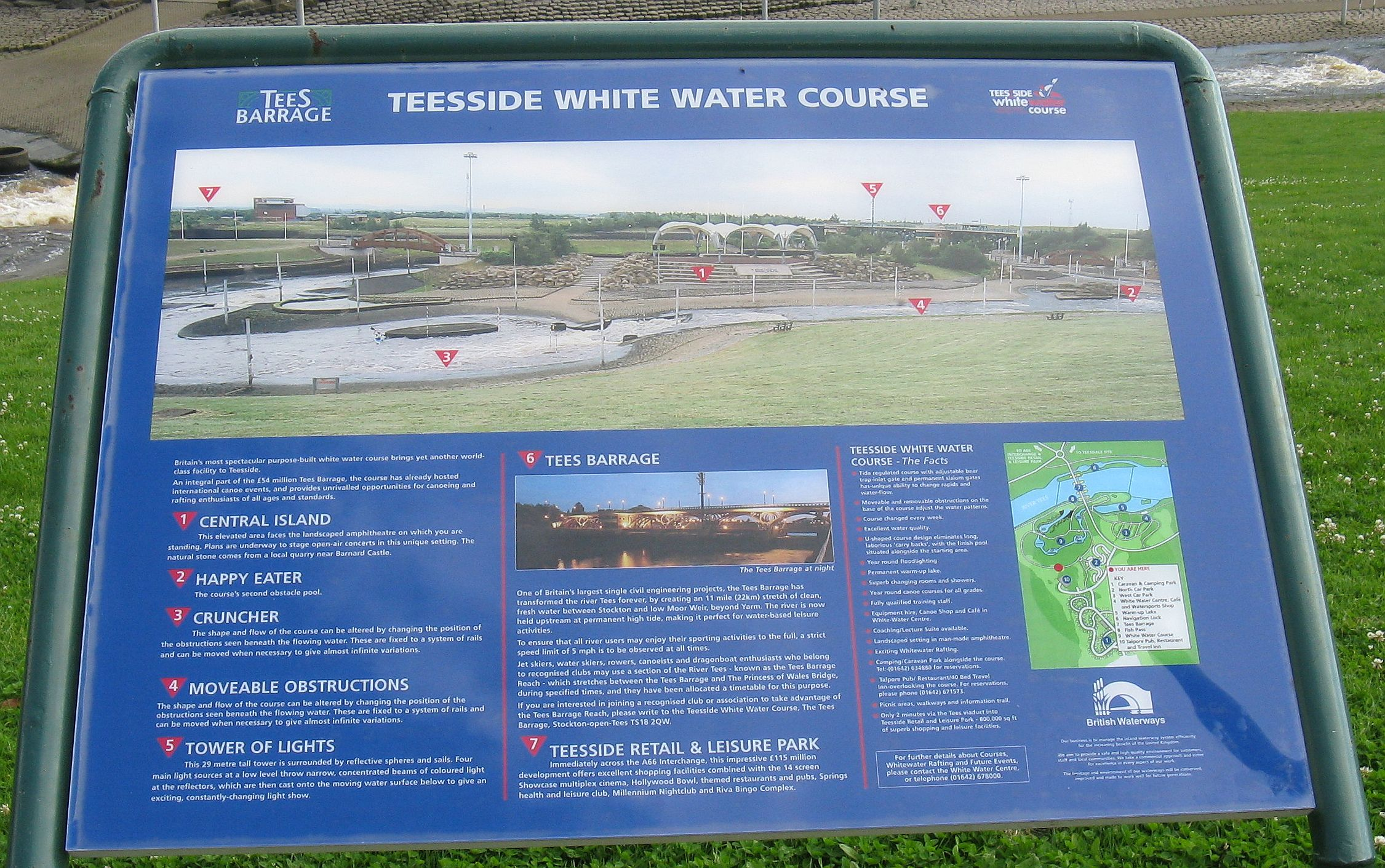
One of the many public interpretation and information boards around the course.

== Redevelopment ==
In 2010 and 2011, there was a £4.6 million redevelopment of the course. The changes include the addition of a new shorter, steeper course and a canoe lift.

Four large 12 m long 3 m diameter Archimedes' screws were installed to pump water from the bottom pool to the top pool guaranteeing water levels for paddlers at all states of the tide. There are plans to generate electricity from the head of river water above the barrage by putting the Archimedes' screws into reverse when not pumping water around the course, making the course more energy efficient. These improvements made the site a world class training facility which is proposed as a training camp location for the 2012 Olympic games. Work started in March 2010 and was completed in October 2011. Her Majesty Queen Elizabeth II, accompanied by His Royal Highness The Duke of Edinburgh, visited Stockton on 18 July 2012 to officially reopen the International White Water Course as part of their Diamond Jubilee tour of the United Kingdom.

== Popular culture ==
The course was used in a segment of the film 1917. In the scene, the actor George MacKay jumps into a river in France and is flung over rapids and a waterfall.

An episode of Emmerdale, where the character Victoria Sugden fell down a waterfall, was filmed at the course.

== Note ==
The Tees Barrage International White Water Course is not to be confused with The River Tees Watersports Centre, Dugdale Street, Stockton-on-Tees 1 km further upriver on the same side near the Princess of Wales Bridge or indeed the Castlegate Quay Water Sports Centre a little further up-river near Teesquay Millennium Bridge.

== See also ==
- List of artificial whitewater courses
