= Prague-Troja Canoeing Centre =

Artificial whitewater course in Czech Republic

Coordinates: 50.113°N 14.425°E

Prague-Troja Canoeing Center
- Slalomový kanál v Praze-Troji

About
- Locale: Prague-Troja, Czech Republic
- Main shape: Linear
- Adjustable: Some recent use of moveable RapidBlocs
- Water source: Vltava River
- Pumped: No
- Flow diversion: Yes
- Practice pool: Yes
- Surf wave: Yes
- Grandstands: Installed for events
- Canoe lift: No
- Facilities: Yes
- Opening date: 1983

Stats
- Length: Competition: 300 m (984 ft); Total: 410 m (1,345 ft)
- Width: 12 m (39 ft)
- Drop: 3.6 m (12 ft)
- Slope: Competition: 1.2% (63 ft/mi)
- Flowrate: 16 m^{3}/s (570 cu ft/s)

The Prague Canoeing Centre is one of the most frequently used venues for international canoe slalom competition. Built in 1983 in Czechoslovakia, it diverts water around a 3.6 metres (12 ft) dam at Troja on the Vltava river in Prague. Its two unique features are its use of car and truck tires as flow diverters and its shallow slope, closer to 1% than the usual nearly 2% for such venues. Despite these characteristics, the Troja facility has hosted ten World Cup races and one World Championship in the 21 years 1992–2012, and the 2013 World Championships.

== Venue ==
The channel walls are vertical, with flow diverters constructed of automobile and truck tires stacked side by side to form large cylinders attached to the bottom by beams running through the tires. Large truck tires are used at the channel sides, where they often breach the surface. In the centre of the flow are smaller automobile tires which remain submerged, and shallow-sloped ramps. In several spots, new concrete platforms have been installed in the channel bed to receive moveable RapidBlocs, like the ones at the Lee Valley White Water Centre used for the London 2012 Summer Olympics.

There are four wing dams on the right and five on the left. At the location of the mid-course bridge, two wing dams are directly across from each other, narrowing the channel by one third. Just below the bridge is a concrete boulder in the channel center, connected to the right bank by a barrier that blocks all flow to the right, effectively narrowing the channel by half.

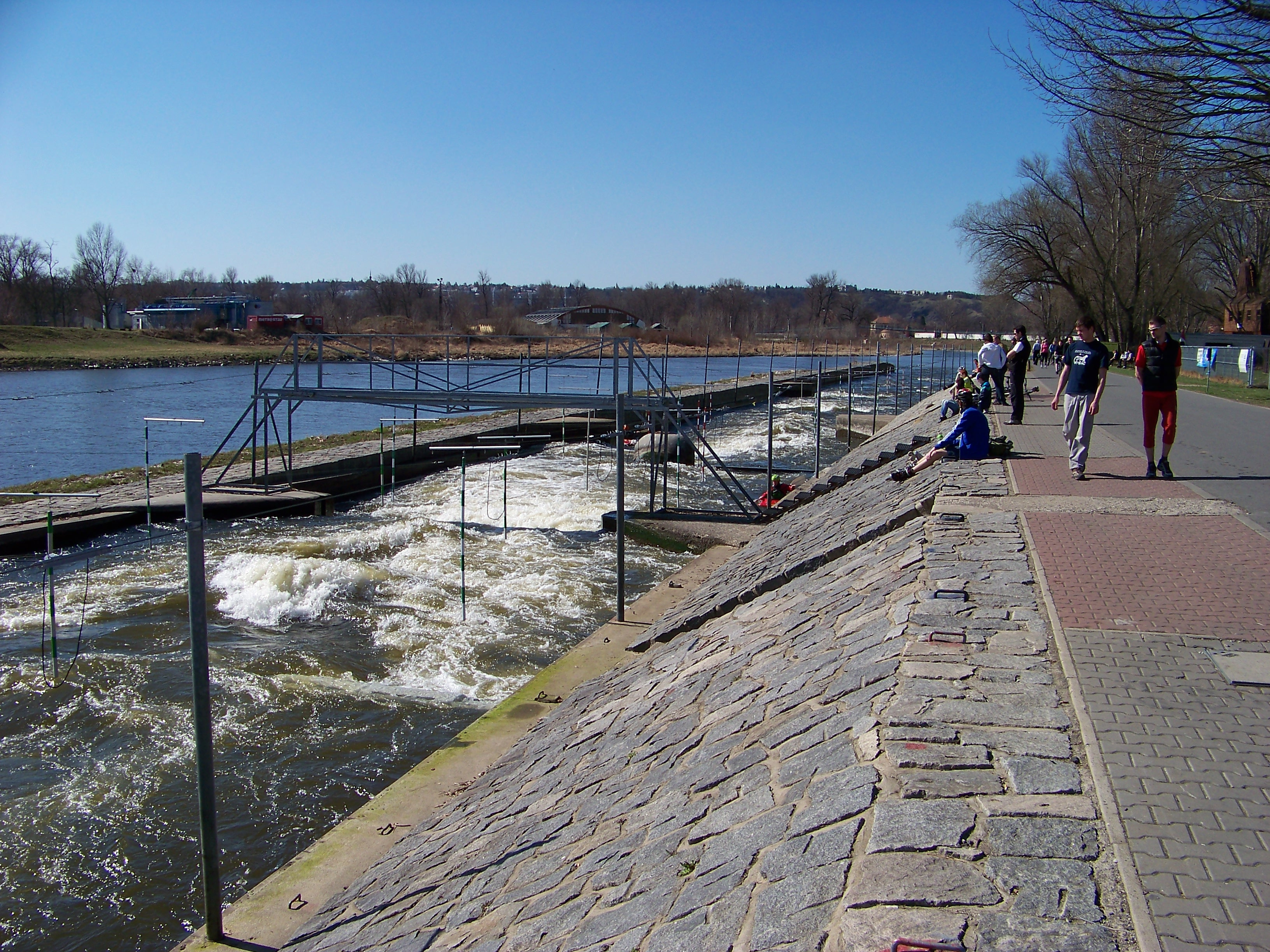
The mid-course bridge and below. For competitions, the sloped right bank is covered with seating.

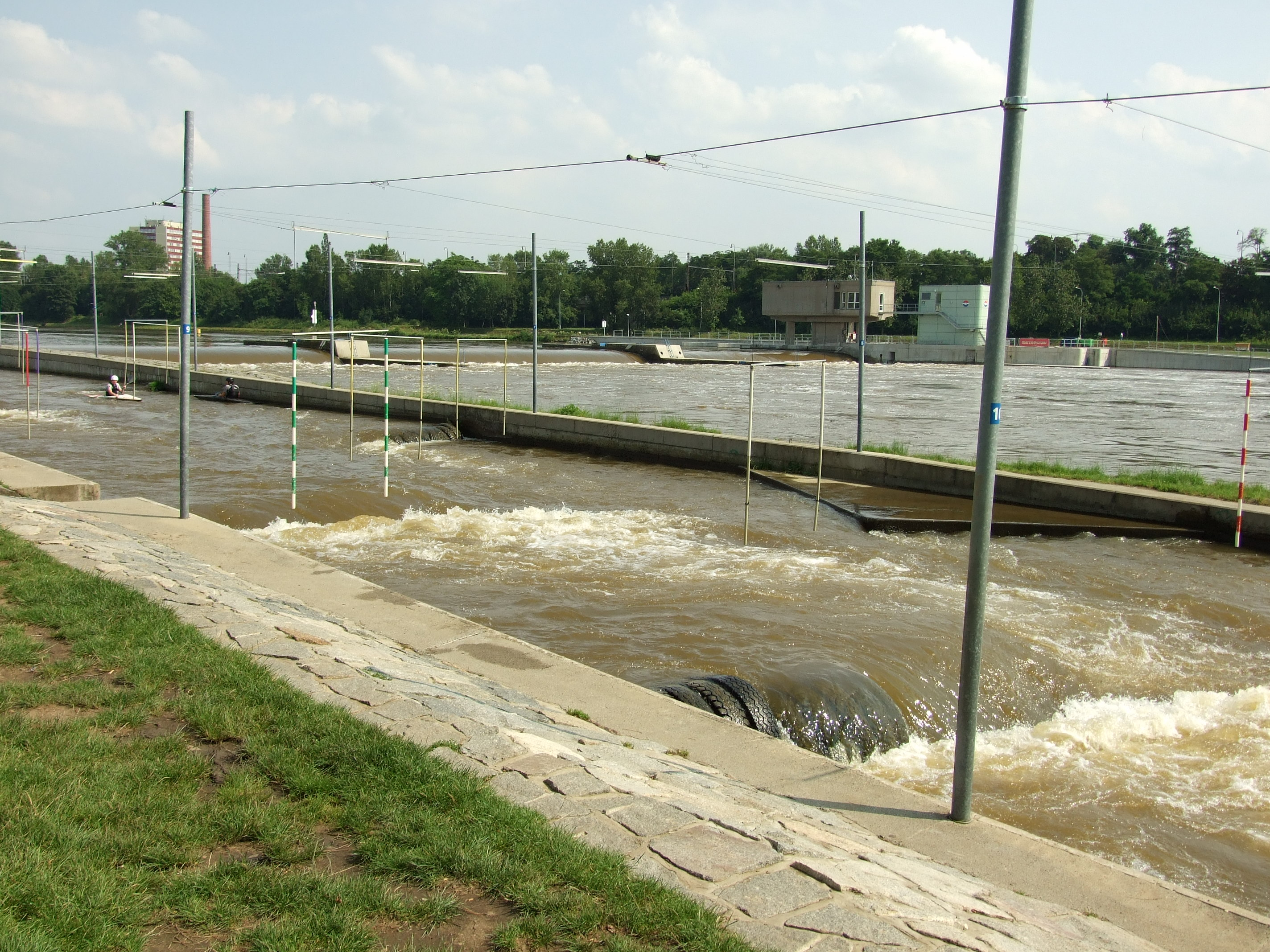
Foreground, the iconic truck tire water diverters. Background, the Troja dam on the Vltava river.

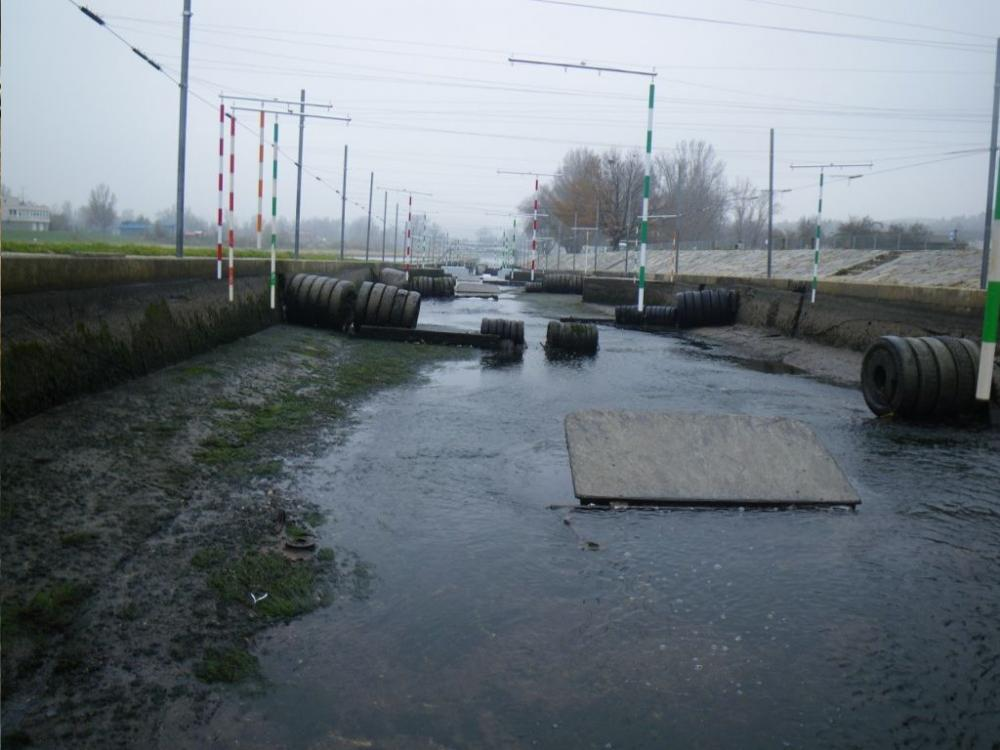
The original water diverters, made from vehicle tires filled with concrete, have been completely replaced by adjustable plastic RapidBlocs.

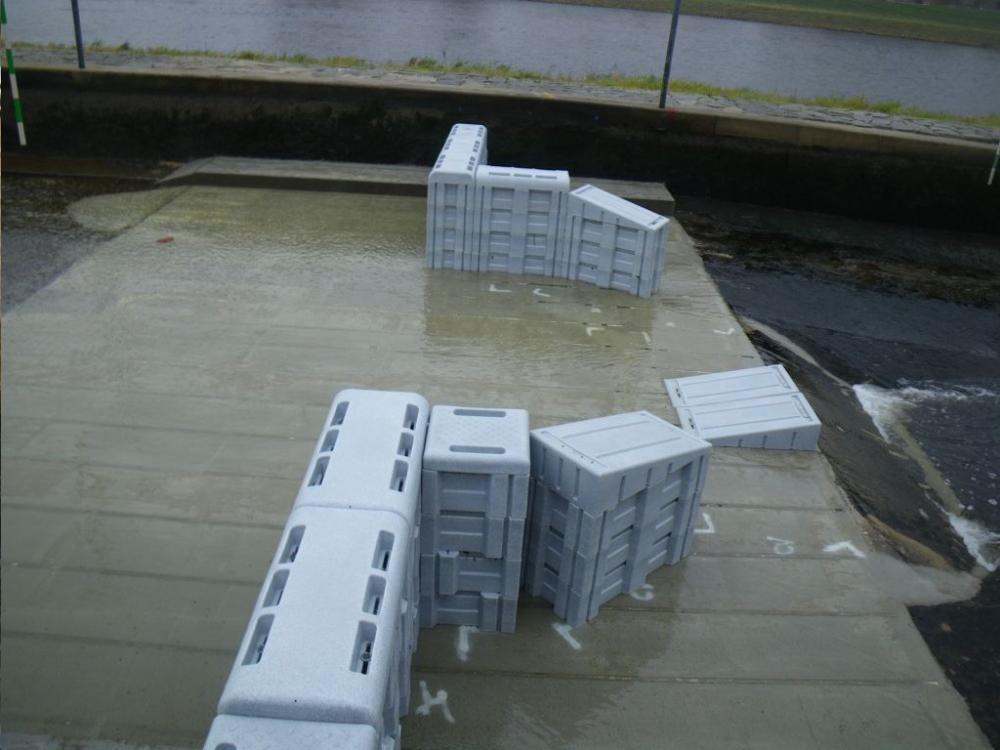
These new plastic wave-shapers, just above the mid-course bridge, use RapidBlocs to create a standing wave for freestyle surfing tricks.

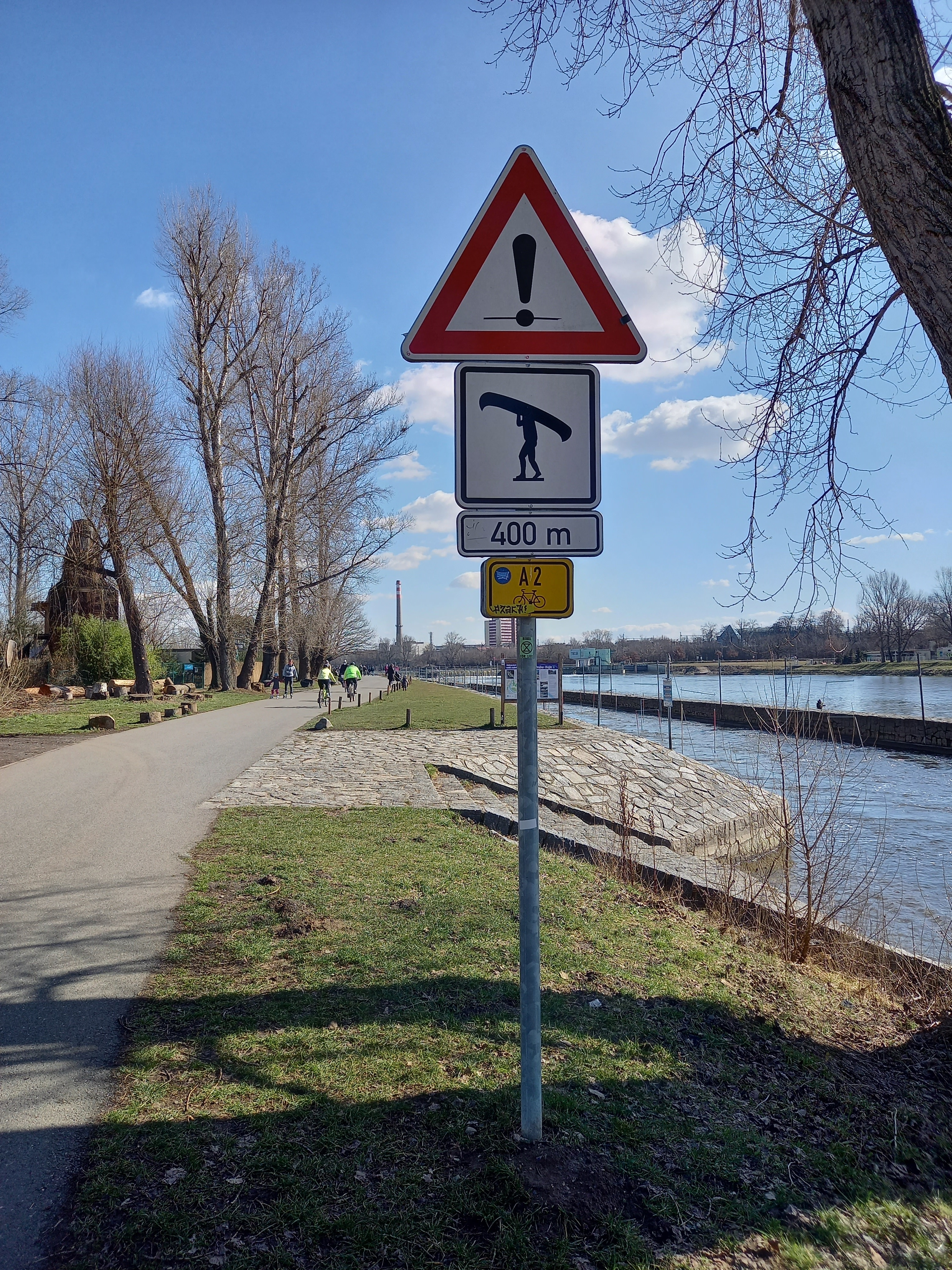
Road sign.

== 2012 World Cup gates ==
Gate map for semi-finals and finals of the 2012 World Cup races on 25 and 26 August 2012.

The double-pole gates were: 1, 2, 16, 18, & 22. Gates 14 & 20 were reverse gates.

== 2013 World Championship gates ==
Gate map for heats of the 2013 World Championship race, 12 September 2013.

Five single-pole gates, each marked with a green dot, and no flush gates.

Gate map for semi-finals and finals of the 2013 World Championship race, 13 September 2013.

Three single-pole gates, each marked with a green dot, and no flush gates. Gate 12 was double width.
