= RapidBlocs =

Obstacle system for artificial whitewater courses

RapidBlocs are a movable obstacle system for artificial whitewater courses. The system was developed by Scott Shipley of S2o Design and Engineering and Andy Laird of Engineering Paddler Design. The system was developed for the Lee Valley White Water Centre that was used for the 2012 London Olympic Games. The system is made of modular blocks that can be secured via unistruts at any point in a compatible channel. The blocks are stackable and can therefore be combined to create a variety of shapes. These shapes are configured to create waves, eddies other hydraulic jumps. There are also a variety of utilitarian configurations that can be created to make stairs, rescue platforms, and to configure varying rescue scenarios for rescue training. At the London Games the RapidBloc system created all of the waves and features and was also used to create the starting gate.

The system has been used in a variety of channels that were either custom built for the system or have been retrofitted to an existing channel – as in the case for the Tees Barrage International White Water Course and the Prague-Troja Canoeing Centre in Prague.
