= Vienna Watersports Arena =

Whitewater venue in Vienna, Austria

Coordinates: 48.193°N 16.461°E

- Vienna Watersports Arena

About
- Locale: Vienna, Austria
- Managing agent: Austrian Canoe Federation
- Main shape: Loop
- Adjustable: Yes
- Water source: New Danube River Channel
- Pumped: Yes
- Practice pool: Yes
- Grandstands: Bleachers
- Canoe lift: Yes
- Facilities: Yes
- Construction: 2010-2013
- Opening date: August 2013

Stats
- Length: 255 metres (837 ft)
- Drop: 3.75 metres (12 ft)
- Slope: 1.5% (80 ft/mile)
- Flowrate: 12 m^{3}/s (420 cu ft/s)

The Vienna Watersports Arena is an artificial whitewater venue for canoe and kayak slalom competition in Vienna, Austria, the only such facility in Austria. It also serves as a family water park, with guided raft trips and practice times for individual boaters. Located across the Danube from the city, on Danube Island, it pumps its water from the New Danube river channel. It opened in August 2013; the following June it hosted the 2014 European Canoe Slalom Championships.

== Venue ==
Course Map

The course was designed by Hydrostadium, the French engineering firm responsible for many of the world's artificial whitewater courses. The chief financial backer is Verbund, Austria's largest electricity producer—hence the German language name "Verbund-Wasserarena." Its modest cost of 5.1 million € ($6.4 million) is one-fourth the cost of the similar facility at Cardiff and only 13% of the cost of Lee Valley, the large venue built for the 2012 Olympics in London. It meets the minimum Olympic standards of 250 meters, 1.5% slope, and 12 m^{3}/s (420 cu ft/s) streamflow. The concrete channel has vertical sides, with concrete steps in the eddies formed by wide spots. The flow diverters are adjustable hexagonal green plastic bollards.

To avoid the need for expensive water filters, the facility is drained once a week and refilled with fresh water from the New Danube.

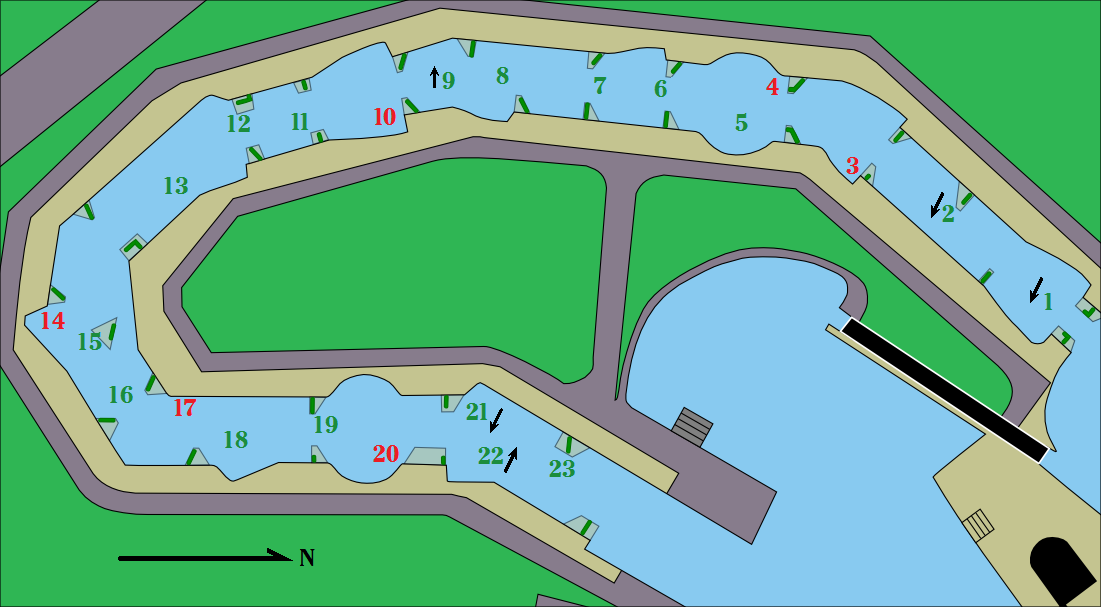
Slalom gates for 2014 European Championships (all races)

== Video ==
- 2014 Euro Championships Nuria Vilarrubla C-1 of Spain (best semi-finals run)
- 2014 Euro Championships Ander Elosegi C-1 of Spain
- 2014 Euro Championships Samuel Hernanz K-1 of Spain (bronze medal run)
- 2014 Euro Championships C-2
