= Okulovka =

Okulovka (Russian: Окуловка) is the name of several inhabited localities in Russia.

== Urban localities ==
- Okulovka (town), Novgorod Oblast, a town in Okulovsky District of Novgorod Oblast; administratively incorporated as a town of district significance

== Rural localities ==
- Okulovka, Arkhangelsk Oblast, a village in Solvychegodsky Selsoviet of Kotlassky District of Arkhangelsk Oblast
- Okulovka (rural locality), Novgorod Oblast, a village under the administrative jurisdiction of the town of district significance of Okulovka in Okulovsky District of Novgorod Oblast
- Okulovka, Perm Krai, a village in Okhansky District of Perm Krai
