= Canoe slalom =

Competitive water sport

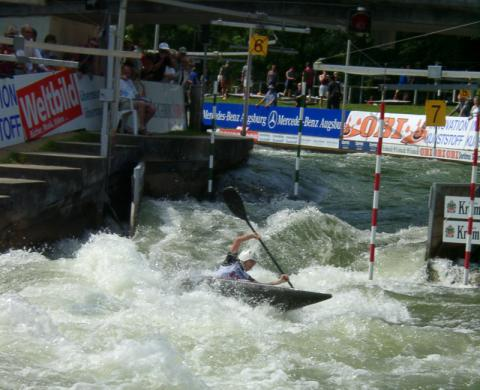
Canoe slalom in Augsburg, Germany

Canoe slalom (previously known as whitewater slalom) is a competitive sport with the aim to navigate a decked canoe or kayak through a course of hanging downstream or upstream gates on river rapids in the fastest time possible. It is one of two kayak and canoeing disciplines at the Summer Olympics, and is referred to by the International Olympic Committee (IOC) as Canoe/Kayak Slalom. The other Olympic canoeing discipline is canoe sprint.

== History ==
Canoe slalom racing started in Switzerland in 1933, initially on a flatwater course. In 1946, the International Canoe Federation (ICF), which governs the sport, was formed. The first World Championships were held in 1949 in Switzerland. From 1949 to 1999, the championships were held every odd-numbered year and have been held annually in non-Summer Olympic years since 2002. Folding kayaks were used from 1949 to 1963; and in the early 1960s, boats were made of fiberglass and nylon. Boats were heavy, usually over 30 pounds (14 kilos). With the advent of kevlar and carbon fiber being used in the 1970s, the widths of the boats were reduced by the ICF, and the boats were reduced in volume to pass the gates, and boats have become much lighter and faster.

From 1949 to 1977, all World Championships were held in Europe. The first World Championship held in North America was held at Jonquière, Québec, Canada, in 1979. It has been a regular Olympic sport since 1992.

Canoe double (C2) men lost its status as an Olympic event to be replaced by canoe single (C1) women, starting in 2021 at Tokyo.

== Rules ==
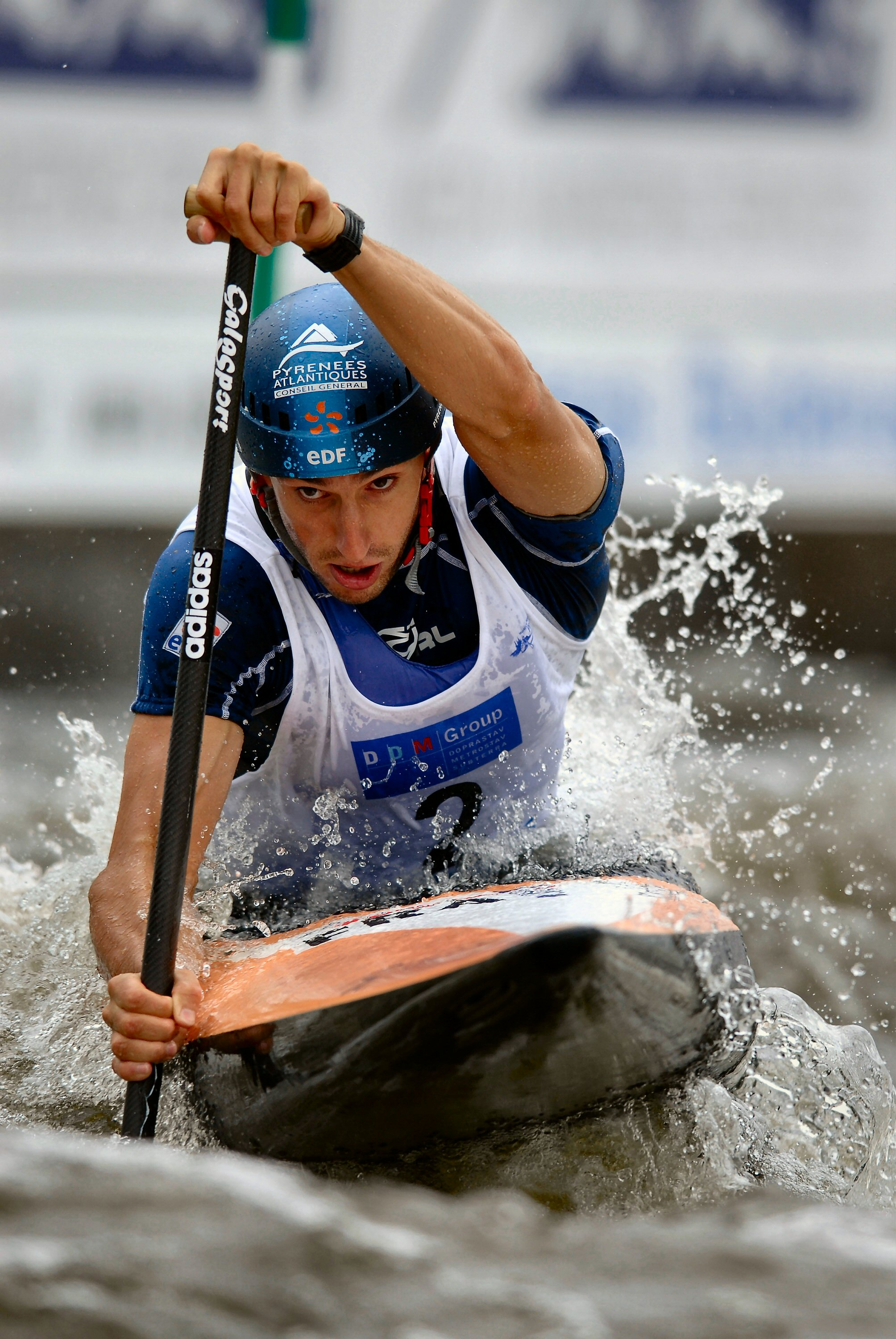
Multiple Olympic champion Tony Estanguet Paddling in a Slalom C1.

Each gate consists of two poles hanging from a wire strung across the river. There are 18-25 numbered gates in a course, of which 6 or 8 must be upstream gates, and they are colored as either green (downstream) or red (upstream), indicating the direction they must be negotiated. Upstream gates are typically placed in eddies, where the water is flat or moving slightly upstream; the paddler enters an eddy from the main current and paddles upstream through the gate. Downstream gates may also be placed in eddies, to increase the difficulty, and downstream gates in the current can be offset to alternating sides of the current, requiring rapid turns in fast-moving water.

As per the rule book slalom courses are designed to take around 90 seconds to complete for the fastest paddlers. Depending on the level of competition, difficulty of the course, degree of water turbulence, and ability of the other paddlers, times can go up to 200 seconds.

For the gate to be considered correctly negotiated, the whole head of the athlete (or all athletes in the case of team runs) and at the same time a part of the boat must pass through the gate. If the competitor's boat, paddle or body touches either pole of the gate, a time penalty of two seconds is added. If the competitor misses a gate, deliberately pushes the gate to pass through, goes through the gate in the wrong direction or upside-down, or goes through it in the wrong order, a 50-second penalty is given. Only one penalty can be incurred on each gate, and this will be taken as the highest one.

In the 1960s and early 1970s, boats were made of heavy fiberglass and nylon. The boats were high volume and weighed over 30 pounds (14 kilos). In the early 1970s Kevlar was used and the boats became lighter as well as the volume of the boats was being reduced almost every year as new designs were made. A minimum boat weight was introduced to equalize competition when super light materials began to affect race results. Paddle Worldwide (Then ICF) also reduced the width of the boats in the early 1970s. When competitors began using lower-volume boats, the gates were raised from 10 cm to now approximately 20 cm in response to fears that new boats would be of such low volume as to create a hazard to the paddler. Their low-volume sterns allow the boat to slice through the water in a quick turn, or "pivot".

Typically, new racing boats cost between $1,200 and $2,500 (or $850 onwards for the cheapest constructions in fiberglass). Usually boats are made with carbon fiber, Kevlar and fiberglass cloth, using epoxy or polyester resin to hold the layers together. Foam sandwich construction in between layers of carbon, Kevlar, or Aramid is another technique in use to increase the stiffness of slalom boats.

In 2005 the minimum length of these boats was reduced from 4 meters down to 3.5 meters, causing a flurry of new, faster boat designs which are able to navigate courses with more speed and precision. The shorter length also allows for easier navigation and less boat damage in the smaller manmade river beds that are prevalent in current elite competitions.

Boat design progression is rather limited year to year. Directly from the 2017 ICF Canoe Slalom Rules:

- 7.1.1 Measurements
  - All types of K1 Minimum length 3.50 m minimum width 0.60 m
  - All types of C1 Minimum length 3.50 m minimum width 0.60 m
  - All types of C2 Minimum length 4.10 m minimum width 0.75 m
- 7.1.2 Minimum Weight of Boats
  - (The minimum weight of the boat is determined when the boat is dry. The weight minimums were raised for 2017.)
  - All types of K1 9 kg (20 lb). (Previously 8 kg).
  - All types of C1 9 kg (20 lb). (Previously 8 kg).
  - All types of C2 15 kg (33 lb).
- 7.1.3 All boats must have a minimum radius at each end of 2 cm (1 in) horizontally and 1 cm (0 in) vertically.
- 7.1.4 Rudders are prohibited on all boats
- 7.1.5 Boats must be designed to, and remain within, the required dimensions.
- 7.1.6 Kayaks are decked boats, which must be propelled by double-bladed paddles and inside which the competitors sit. Canoes are decked boats that must be propelled by single-bladed paddles and inside which the competitors kneel.

There are rules governing almost every aspect of slalom equipment used in major competition, including sponsor advertisement. Some of these rules vary from country to country; each national canoe and kayak governing body publishes its own variation of the rules.

== Venues ==
Diagram showing an example of a whitewater slalom course, Lee Valley White Water Centre.

Slalom races take place on stretches of river or whitewater, often referred to colloquially as a 'course', not to be confused with the gate orientation of a race course for a specific event. Canoe slalom competitions are usually held at venues with Class II - IV whitewater.

Venues differ significantly from each other and are split into two main categories, natural and artificial whitewater. The inaugural Olympic canoe slalom event at 1972 Olympics took place on the Augsburg Eiskanal, this set the precedent for subsequent Olympic and non-Olympic venues on artificial whitewater. With the exception of the altered river bed of the Ocoee River in 1996, every Olympic venue has been an artificial concrete channel. Since the late 1980s, artificial course creation has surged; with most countries that field Olympic slalom teams training on one or more artificial courses.

Paddle Worldwide have set out a series of requirements for the specifications of a competition venue, both natural and artificial courses are permitted.

Selected Canoe Slalom Venue Specification
Specification	Bounds
Course Length	200 - 400 m
Flow Rate	8 - 16 m^{3}s^{-1}
Nominal Depth in Centered Flow	1,500 mm
Minimum Depth in Hydraulic Features	600 mm
Minimum Depth in Eddies	1000 mm
Maximum Gradient Over the Length of course	2 % of Length
Nominal Width at Channel Floor	10 m

== Kayak cross ==
Kayak cross, previously known as extreme slalom, is a discipline in which four kayaks race each other on a single course, similarly to BMX racing, skate cross, four-cross, ski cross and snowboard cross. The competitors drop into the water from a starting ramp, must pass through gates, and must perform a kayak roll during the run. Contact with other boats is permitted, but competitors may be disqualified for dangerous paddling. Faults may be assessed for rule violations (such as not properly navigating a gate). Competitors with zero faults are ranked by order of finish and ahead of any competitors with one or more faults; if two or more competitors have faults, they are ranked by number of faults and then by the distance traveled without a fault.

== Olympics ==
main article: Canoe slalom at the Olympics

Pictogram for Canoeing at the Summer Olympics

Slalom canoeing made its Olympic debut in 1972 in Augsburg, West Germany, for the Munich Games. It was not seen again until 1992 in La Seu d'Urgell as part of the 1992 Olympics in Barcelona, Spain. Since then, slalom paddling has been a regular Olympic event in the following locations:

- 1972: Augsburg, West Germany
- 1992: La Seu d'Urgell, Spain
- 1996: Ocoee River, United States
- 2000: Penrith, Australia
- 2004: Athens, Greece
- 2008: Shunyi, Beijing, China
- 2012: Lee Valley, UK
- 2016: Rio de Janeiro, Brazil
- 2020: Tokyo, Japan
- 2024: Vaires-sur-Marne, Paris, France
- 2028: Riversport, Oklahoma City, United States
- 2032: TBA, Brisbane, Australia

There are currently six Olympic Medal events:

- Men's C-1 (canoe singles)
- Men's K-1 (kayak singles)
- Men's KX-1 (kayak cross), introduced in 2024
- Women's C-1, introduced in 2021
- Women's K-1
- Women's KX-1, introduced in 2024

And one discontinued event:

- C-2 (canoe doubles)

== See also ==
- Canoe Slalom World Cup
- ICF Canoe Slalom World Championships
- Canoeing at the Summer Olympics
- List of artificial whitewater courses
