= Lee Valley White Water Centre =

White water sports venue in Hertfordshire, England

About
- Locale: Hertfordshire, England, United Kingdom
- Coordinates: 51.6883°N 0.0156°W
- Managing agent: Greenwich Leisure Limited
- Main shape: Two Loops
- Water source: Groundwater
- Pumped: Olympic: 5 pumps; Training: 3 pumps
- Practice pool: Yes
- Lighting: yes
- Canoe lift: yes
- Opening date: 9 December 2010

Stats
- Length: 300 m (980 ft)
- Drop: 5.5 m (18 ft)
- Flowrate: 13 m^{3}/s (460 cu ft/s)

Lee Valley White Water Centre (previously known as Broxbourne White Water Canoe Centre) is a white-water slalom centre in the Middle Lea Valley, in the Borough of Broxbourne, Hertfordshire. It was constructed to host the canoe slalom events of the London 2012 Olympic Games.

On 9 December 2010, the Princess Royal officially opened the venue which is owned by Lee Valley Regional Park Authority and managed by Greenwich Leisure Limited (GLL) under its "Better" brand. The £31 million ($50 million US) project to construct the centre finished on schedule and was the first newly constructed Olympic venue to be completed.

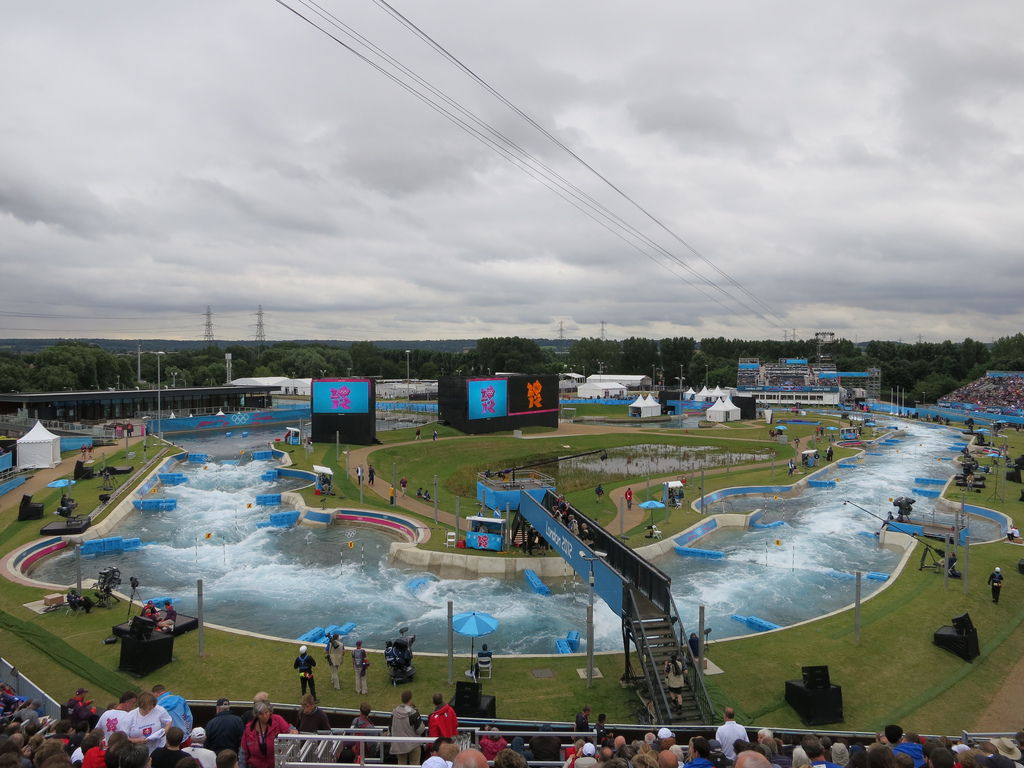
2012 Olympic Games, 31 July

The Olympic canoe slalom competition was held from 29 July through 2 August 2012. The venue also hosted the 2015 ICF Canoe Slalom World Championships.

== Venue ==
Lee Valley White Water Centre map

The venue is located at Waltham Cross in Hertfordshire, adjacent to the River Lee, the county border with Essex. The site is just outside the northern boundary of Greater London and 9 miles (14 km) north-west of the Queen Elizabeth Olympic Park in Stratford, east London. It is in the heart of River Lee Country Park which is part of the 10,000-acre (40 km^{2}), 26-mile (42 km) long Lee Valley Park. The venue opened in late 2010 offering canoeing and rafting activities to the public ahead of the London 2012 Summer Olympics.

The venue has a purpose-built slalom course for the Olympic white-water canoe events (flatwater canoeing and kayaking events took place at Dorney Lake, Buckinghamshire, west of London). The main competition channel is an international- and Olympic-standard 300-metre canoe and kayak slalom course. It and the shorter warm-up course empty into the warm-up and cool-down lake.

The white water is created by a system of pumps which lift water into the two start pools. All of the water contained in the system is slightly chlorinated in order to retain water quality. During the Games, temporary seating was installed around the venue for 12,000 spectators.

The 300-metre competition course has a drop of 5.5 metres (18 ft), for an average slope of 1.8% (18 m/km or 95 ft/mile) and a pump-powered streamflow of 13 cubic metres per second (460 cubic feet per second). The intermediate/warm-up course is 160 metres long with a drop of 1.6 metres and flow of 10.5 cubic metres per second. A 10,000-square-metre lake, filled with groundwater, supplies the water for the pumps. Lee Valley Regional Park Authority hope to bring in up to £45,000 per day from visitors to offset the energy cost of pumping the water.

The course is sited within a new landscaped parkland setting, including path and bridge networks to enable spectators to have access and view the events. A new facility building houses reception, café, changing rooms, shop, offices, spectator viewing, equipment storage and water pump and filtration facilities.

=== Pre-Games use ===
The venue was officially opened by the Princess Royal on 9 December 2010. It is owned by Lee Valley Regional Park Authority and was originally managed by them as well, but since April 1, 2022, is now managed by Greenwich Leisure Limited (GLL) under its "Better" brand. The £31 million ($50 million US) project to construct the centre finished on schedule and was the first newly constructed Olympic venue to be completed.

Lee Valley White Water Centre was the only brand new London 2012 venue available for public use before the Games. On 8 September 2012 it became the first London 2012 venue to reopen to the public. The centre is intended to provide canoeing and rafting activities for users of all abilities who will be able to take advantage of the Olympic and intermediate course. The venue is owned, funded and managed by Lee Valley Regional Park Authority; it will join the other London 2012 venues – the Velopark, Hockey Centre and Tennis centre at Eton Manor – that the Park Authority will also own, fund and manage in legacy.

=== Gate maps for 2012 Olympics ===
Preliminary Heats, 29, 30 July

Semi- & Final Races, 31 July 1, 2 August

Two gate sets were used for the Olympic Games, one for the first two days (left) and another for the last three days (right). Each gate set had six upstream gates (red numbers), but gate #12 of the first set was a flush gate with the second pole directly downstream of the first. Paddlers entered gate #12 from the left wall side and exited into the main current. Gate #18 of the second set was a downstream flush gate, with entrance from the flow and exit into the eddy. A 90-degree right turn direct from #18 to #19 was faster than the 270-degree eddy spin used by many contenders. All the gates were double-pole. There was no use of single-pole gates.

Olympic Results.

=== Post-Games use ===
The venue opened again to the public after the Games as part of the Olympic Legacy Works. Spectator seating was removed and the venue returned to providing a leisure attraction for canoeing and white-water rafting and a competition venue for elite events, to be managed by Lee Valley Regional Park Authority. In April 2011 it was confirmed that the centre would host the 2015 ICF Canoe Slalom World Championships. A £6.3 million redevelopment project was completed in February 2014 leading to the creation of new visitor facilities and new offices and training base for the GB Canoe Slalom team.

== Design ==
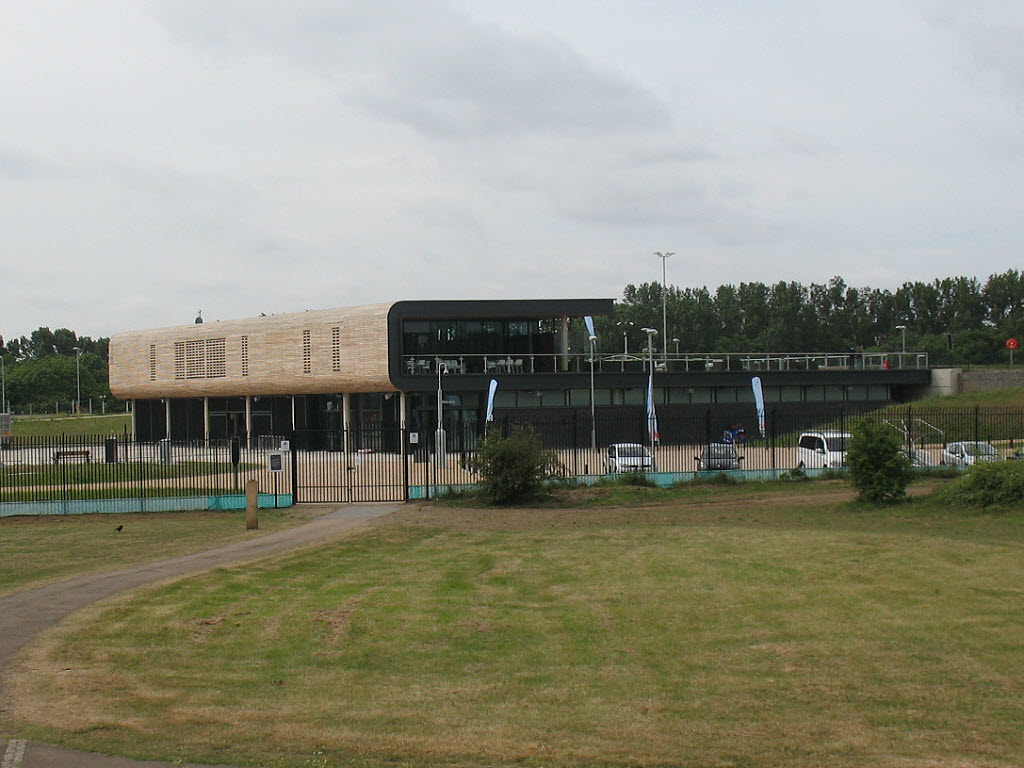
Pavilion at Lee Valley White Water Centre

The main facility building is designed by FaulknerBrowns Architects. The canoe course is located within a wider parkland setting designed by U.S.-based landscape architects Michael Van Valkenburgh Associates. White-water course specialists Whitewater Parks International, working with civil and structural engineers Cundall, are the designers of the white-water courses from initial concept through venue delivery. Indigo Planning were the planning consultants and managed the preparation of the Environmental Statement. Stage D of the design process was completed by Morrison Construction The Team of S2o Design and Engineering and Engineering Paddler Designs completed the detail design of the white-water channel itself. The detail design of the white-water channel involved the creation of a 1:10 Froude scaled physical model that resulted in some channel edge changes but no changes to the hydraulic design of white-water channel. One of these changes was the conceptualization, design and implementation of the RapidBlocs Obstacle system. The RapidBlocs system allows course operators to reconfigure the placement of boulders, eddies, and rapids to meet design objectives. S2o and EPD were further responsible for course tuning and commissioning.

== Transport ==
=== Road ===
The site is located just off the A121 road, with easy access from the A10 road, and junctions 25 and 26 of the M25 motorway.

=== Rail ===
Rail access to the site is via Cheshunt and Waltham Cross railway stations on the West Anglia Main Line, with frequent services from Stratford, near the main Olympic site, and Liverpool Street. Theobalds Grove railway station, on the Lea Valley Lines, is nearby.

=== Bus ===
Arriva Herts and Essex operates services 66, 86, and 251, which pass close to the venue. Other bus routes run by Transport for London and Intalink stop at the nearby bus station in Waltham Cross town centre.

=== Cycle and pedestrian ===
The Lee Navigation towpath forms part of the Lee Valley Walk and the National Cycle Route 1 is adjacent to the venue.
