= 2022 Canoe Slalom World Cup =

Canoe Slalom World Cup

The 2022 Canoe Slalom World Cup was a series of five races in six canoeing and kayaking categories organized by the International Canoe Federation (ICF). It was the 35th edition.

Russia and Belarus were excluded from participation due to the 2022 Russian invasion of Ukraine.

== Calendar ==
The series opened with World Cup Race 1 in Prague, Czech Republic (10–12 June) and closed with the World Cup Final in La Seu, Spain (2–4 September).

Label	Venue	Date
World Cup Race 1	(Czech Republic) Prague	10–12 June
World Cup Race 2	(Poland) Kraków	17–19 June
World Cup Race 3	(Slovenia) Tacen	24–26 June
World Cup Race 4	(France) Pau	26–28 August
World Cup Final	(Spain) La Seu	2–4 September

== Standings ==
The winner of each race was awarded 60 points (with double points awarded for the World Cup Final). Points for lower places differed from one category to another. Every participant was guaranteed at least 2 points for participation and 5 points for qualifying into the semifinal.

=== C1 men ===
Pos	Athlete	CZE (Czech Republic)	POL (Poland)	SLO (Slovenia)	FRA (France)	ESP (Spain)	Points
1	Nicolas Gestin (FRA)	2	1	15	4	1	309
2	Luka Božič (SLO)	1	11	2	2	3	302
3	Matej Beňuš (SVK)	9	4	11	8	7	232
4	Adam Burgess (GBR)	20	3	9	9	10	213
5	Benjamin Savšek (SLO)	6	2	3	3	30	207
6	Miquel Travé (ESP)		24	16	5	2	198
7	Raffaello Ivaldi (ITA)	25	9	7	14	8	196
8	Liam Jegou (IRL)	8	17	17	6	14	190
9	Ryan Westley (GBR)	14	7	20		5	180
10	Denis Gargaud Chanut (FRA)	28	6	4	1	28	175
11	Anže Berčič (SLO)	17	32	10	30	4	159
12	Marko Mirgorodský (SVK)	7	23	6	27	20	158
13	Roberto Colazingari (ITA)	12	27	14	33	6	157
13	Václav Chaloupka (CZE)	27	5		13	9	157
15	Paolo Ceccon (ITA)	26	22	12	26	11	142
16	Vojtěch Heger (CZE)	5			11	12	138
17	Zachary Lokken (USA)	36	15	18	22	13	136
18	Mewen Debliquy (FRA)	11	12		7	25	133
19	Robert Hendrick (IRL)	18	14		29	15	117
19	Lukáš Rohan (CZE)	3	18	30	25	27	117

=== C1 women ===
Pos	Athlete	CZE (Czech Republic)	POL (Poland)	SLO (Slovenia)	FRA (France)	ESP (Spain)	Points
1	Tereza Fišerová (CZE)	1	18	11	10	3	251
2	Mallory Franklin (GBR)	10	1	1	9	21	234
3	Elena Lilik (GER)	2	30	3	8	6	232
4	Marjorie Delassus (FRA)	8	2		5	4	229
5	Gabriela Satková (CZE)	5			1	2	214
6	Jessica Fox (AUS)	24	5	12	3	10	210
7	Elena Borghi (ITA)	7	4		4	8	208
8	Martina Satková (CZE)	3	3	29	12	14	196
9	Ana Sátila (BRA)	20	19	10	7	9	193
10	Andrea Herzog (GER)	21			6	1	184
11	Kimberley Woods (GBR)	6	24	6	17	17	179
12	Viktoriia Us (UKR)	22	15	4	23	11	178
13	Mònica Dòria Vilarrubla (AND)	16	13		18	5	170
14	Noemie Fox (AUS)	26	9	15	16	16	158
15	Zuzana Paňková (SVK)	4			2	15	157
16	Viktoria Wolffhardt (AUT)	18	14	14	25	20	144
17	Ainhoa Lameiro (ESP)		16	40	13	7	139
17	Emanuela Luknárová (SVK)	14		9	19	18	139
19	Miren Lazkano (ESP)	11	17	21	21	24	136
20	Lucie Baudu (FRA)	9	11		30	12	135

=== K1 men ===
Pos	Athlete	CZE (Czech Republic)	POL (Poland)	SLO (Slovenia)	FRA (France)	ESP (Spain)	Points
1	Jiří Prskavec (CZE)	4	3	1	5	1	317
2	Vít Přindiš (CZE)	14	1	11	18	3	252
3	Peter Kauzer (SLO)	1	8	4	40	7	231
4	Martin Dougoud (SUI)	3	7	19	2	20	222
5	Ondřej Tunka (CZE)	22	5	15	7	8	217
6	Giovanni De Gennaro (ITA)	2	20	9	37	4	215
7	Martin Srabotnik (SLO)	34	30	2	33	2	203
8	Mario Leitner (AUT)	7	26	8	11	16	192
9	Malo Quéméneur (FRA)	16	4		14	6	188
10	Joseph Clarke (GBR)	31	2	16	35	9	186
11	Noah Hegge (GER)	12	40	10	10	13	178
12	Gelindo Chiarello (SUI)	30	14	21	9	11	177
13	Lucien Delfour (AUS)	35	18	13	22	10	168
14	Timothy Anderson (AUS)	21	27	12	15	22	151
15	Miquel Travé (ESP)		23		8	5	148
16	Finn Butcher (NZL)	18	22		4	19	146
17	Stefan Hengst (GER)	9	39	40	20	12	141
18	Boris Neveu (FRA)	13	10		3	35	140
19	Quan Xin (CHN)	39	25	28	6	23	129
20	Jakub Grigar (SVK)	6	13	3			124

=== K1 women ===
Pos	Athlete	CZE (Czech Republic)	POL (Poland)	SLO (Slovenia)	FRA (France)	ESP (Spain)	Points
1	Jessica Fox (AUS)	1	1	1	1	11	304
2	Mallory Franklin (GBR)	4	24	2	16	9	217
3	Tereza Fišerová (CZE)	5	2	16	3	23	214
4	Camille Prigent (FRA)	3	6		27	2	213
5	Stefanie Horn (ITA)	8	18	12	8	7	212
6	Ricarda Funk (GER)	7	30		4	1	211
7	Viktoriia Us (UKR)	13	7	3	14	17	201
8	Mònica Dòria Vilarrubla (AND)	15	13		15	3	186
8	Klaudia Zwolińska (POL)	11	4	14	12	19	186
10	Kimberley Woods (GBR)	12	16	26	26	4	176
11	Eva Terčelj (SLO)	50	15	8	5	12	174
12	Viktoria Wolffhardt (AUT)	22	14	13	6	22	164
13	Lena Teunissen (NED)	26		20	18	5	149
14	Corinna Kuhnle (AUT)	53	21	7	17	15	146
15	Eva Alina Hočevar (SLO)	35	19	5	7	24	144
16	Ajda Novak (SLO)	16	9	31	34	8	143
16	Emma Vuitton (FRA)	18	10		10	18	143
18	Ana Sátila (BRA)	6	8	9	22	32	139
19	Barbora Valíková (CZE)	23	25	6	39	20	124
20	Maialen Chourraut (ESP)				9	6	120

=== Extreme slalom men ===
Pos	Athlete	CZE (Czech Republic)	POL (Poland)	SLO (Slovenia)	FRA (France)	ESP (Spain)	Points
1	Vojtěch Heger (CZE)	12			4	1	178
2	Vít Přindiš (CZE)	18	14	2	34	4	160
3	Théo Desvignes (FRA)	25	19		5	3	148
4	Manuel Ochoa (ESP)		13	54	10	2	140
5	Dimitri Marx (SUI)	7	43	19	9	5	135
6	Isak Öhrström (SWE)	9	16	1	7	28	122
7	Joseph Clarke (GBR)	2	3	27	20	40	117
8	Pedro Gonçalves (BRA)	3	57	21	3	26	114
9	Tine Kancler (SLO)			4	14	9	92
9	Vid Kuder Marušič (SLO)	10	2	25	42	15	92

=== Extreme slalom women ===
Pos	Athlete	CZE (Czech Republic)	POL (Poland)	SLO (Slovenia)	FRA (France)	ESP (Spain)	Points
1	Mallory Franklin (GBR)	3	26		7	1	204
2	Tereza Fišerová (CZE)	1	4	4	43	8	202
3	Eva Terčelj (SLO)	11		6	2	4	195
4	Elena Lilik (GER)	44		5	9	2	171
5	Noemie Fox (AUS)	4	2	7	10	26	155
6	Miren Lazkano (ESP)	5	33	11	36	5	139
7	Kimberley Woods (GBR)	35	8	1	5	17	135
8	Olatz Arregui (ESP)		34	17	26	3	110
9	Martina Wegman (NED)	14	1	19	18	12	103
10	Corinna Kuhnle (AUT)		6	2	41	48	96

== Points ==
- World Cup points were awarded based on the results of each race at each event as follows:

Position	1st	2nd	3rd	4th	5th	6th	7th	8th	9th	10th
C1 M	60	55	50	46	44	42	40	38	36	34
C1 W	60	55	50	46	44	42	40	38	36	34
K1 M	60	55	50	44	43	42	41	40	39	38
K1 W	60	55	50	46	44	42	40	38	36	34
Extreme slalom	60	55	50	45	40	35	30	25	19	17

== Results ==
=== World Cup Race 1 ===
10–12 June in Prague, Czech Republic.

Event	Gold	Score	Silver	Score	Bronze	Score
C1 men	Luka Božič (SLO)	97.75	Nicolas Gestin (FRA)	98.71	Lukáš Rohan (CZE)	99.88
C1 women	Tereza Fišerová (CZE)	111.80	Elena Lilik (GER)	112.80	Martina Satková (CZE)	113.35
K1 men	Peter Kauzer (SLO)	95.54	Giovanni De Gennaro (ITA)	96.49	Martin Dougoud (SUI)	97.28
K1 women	Jessica Fox (AUS)	103.91	Elena Lilik (GER)	104.80	Camille Prigent (FRA)	105.33
Extreme slalom men	Stefan Hengst (GER)		Joseph Clarke (GBR)		Pedro Gonçalves (BRA)	
Extreme slalom women	Tereza Fišerová (CZE)		Klaudia Zwolińska (POL)		Mallory Franklin (GBR)	

=== World Cup Race 2 ===
17–19 June in Kraków, Poland.

The German team had to withdraw after the heats due to two positive COVID-19 tests within their team.

Event	Gold	Score	Silver	Score	Bronze	Score
C1 men	Nicolas Gestin (FRA)	93.14	Benjamin Savšek (SLO)	93.18	Adam Burgess (GBR)	93.49
C1 women	Mallory Franklin (GBR)	103.31	Marjorie Delassus (FRA)	104.48	Martina Satková (CZE)	107.83
K1 men	Vít Přindiš (CZE)	84.94	Joseph Clarke (GBR)	85.10	Jiří Prskavec (CZE)	85.46
K1 women	Jessica Fox (AUS)	91.29	Tereza Fišerová (CZE)	93.87	Amálie Hilgertová (CZE)	94.26
Extreme slalom men	Christopher Bowers (GBR)		Vid Kuder Marušič (SLO)		Joseph Clarke (GBR)	
Extreme slalom women	Martina Wegman (NED)		Noemie Fox (AUS)		Viktoriia Us (UKR)	

=== World Cup Race 3 ===
24–26 June in Tacen, Slovenia.

Event	Gold	Score	Silver	Score	Bronze	Score
C1 men	Alexander Slafkovský (SVK)	86.27	Luka Božič (SLO)	86.44	Benjamin Savšek (SLO)	86.83
C1 women	Mallory Franklin (GBR)	96.52	Evy Leibfarth (USA)	98.27	Elena Lilik (GER)	101.51
K1 men	Jiří Prskavec (CZE)	79.79	Martin Srabotnik (SLO)	81.16	Jakub Grigar (SVK)	84.61
K1 women	Jessica Fox (AUS)	94.24	Mallory Franklin (GBR)	97.02	Viktoriia Us (UKR)	97.58
Extreme slalom men	Isak Öhrström (SWE)		Vít Přindiš (CZE)		Anatole Delassus (FRA)	
Extreme slalom women	Kimberley Woods (GBR)		Corinna Kuhnle (AUT)		Viktoria Wolffhardt (AUT)	

=== World Cup Race 4 ===
26–28 August in Pau, France.

Event	Gold	Score	Silver	Score	Bronze	Score
C1 men	Denis Gargaud Chanut (FRA)	103.73	Luka Božič (SLO)	103.81	Benjamin Savšek (SLO)	105.19
C1 women	Gabriela Satková (CZE)	113.54	Zuzana Paňková (SVK)	117.94	Jessica Fox (AUS)	118.43
K1 men	Gabriel De Coster (BEL)	97.94	Martin Dougoud (SUI)	98.55	Boris Neveu (FRA)	98.64
K1 women	Jessica Fox (AUS)	108.20	Natalia Pacierpnik (POL)	110.00	Tereza Fišerová (CZE)	110.63
Extreme slalom men	Boris Neveu (FRA)		Giovanni De Gennaro (ITA)		Pedro Gonçalves (BRA)	
Extreme slalom women	Jessica Fox (AUS)		Eva Terčelj (SLO)		Ajda Novak (SLO)	

=== World Cup Final ===
2–4 September in La Seu, Spain.

Event	Gold	Score	Silver	Score	Bronze	Score
C1 men	Nicolas Gestin (FRA)	93.37	Miquel Travé (ESP)	93.46	Luka Božič (SLO)	94.50
C1 women	Andrea Herzog (GER)	103.25	Gabriela Satková (CZE)	103.31	Tereza Fišerová (CZE)	106.15
K1 men	Jiří Prskavec (CZE)	87.07	Martin Srabotnik (SLO)	87.28	Vít Přindiš (CZE)	87.44
K1 women	Ricarda Funk (GER)	92.32	Camille Prigent (FRA)	96.21	Mònica Dòria Vilarrubla (AND)	96.89
Extreme slalom men	Vojtěch Heger (CZE)		Manuel Ochoa (ESP)		Théo Desvignes (FRA)	
Extreme slalom women	Mallory Franklin (GBR)		Elena Lilik (GER)		Olatz Arregui (ESP)	
