= 2021 ICF Canoe Slalom World Championships – Teams =

World championship canoeing event

The teams events at the 2021 ICF Canoe Slalom World Championships took place on 22 September 2021 at the Čunovo Water Sports Centre in Bratislava. It was the 41st edition of the K1M, K1W and C1M team events, and the 8th edition of the C1W team event.

== Competition format ==
Teams events in canoe slalom use a single-round format with the team with the fastest time inclusive of penalties awarded gold. Teams started in reverse order of their results at the previous World Championships in 2019. Teams consist of three athletes from the same nation, who must complete the course at the same time, often employing a technique known as 'weaving' in upstream gates, where one paddler exits the gate at the same time as the other enters in order to minimise time loss.

Penalties are compounded for each gate, such that a team can incur a total of 150 seconds of penalties on a single gate (if all three miss it) or 6 seconds (if all three touch it). The time begins when the first paddler crosses the start beam and ends when the last one crosses the finish beam. All three paddlers must cross the finish line within 15 seconds or else incur an additional 50-second penalty.

== Schedule ==
All times are Central European Summer Time (UTC+2)

Date	Time	Round
Wednesday, 22 September 2021
Wednesday, 22 September 2021	09:30	K1W Teams Final
Wednesday, 22 September 2021	09:57	K1M Teams Final
Wednesday, 22 September 2021	10:52	C1W Teams Final
Wednesday, 22 September 2021	11:20	C1M Teams Final

== Women's K1 Teams ==
Great Britain entered the event as favourites, being the reigning World and European Champions. They won the event with a clean run of 101.24 seconds over 2019 silver-medallists the Czech Republic and host nation Slovakia. The British win was particularly significant, given Kimberley Woods had been in a wheelchair less than a week prior, following a car accident. This was Jana Dukátová's last teams event after she announced her retirement at the end of 2021, having taken the teams title in 2011.

Rank	Bib	Nation	Canoeists	Results		
Rank	Bib	Nation	Canoeists	Time	Pen.	Total
1st place, gold medalist(s)	1	Great Britain	Kimberley Woods; Fiona Pennie; Mallory Franklin	101.24	0	101.24
2nd place, silver medalist(s)	2	Czech Republic	Kateřina Minařík Kudějová; Antonie Galušková; Lucie Nesnídalová	104.71	2	106.71
3rd place, bronze medalist(s)	5	Slovakia	Eliška Mintálová; Jana Dukátová; Soňa Stanovská	103.72	4	107.72
4	8	Slovenia	Urša Kragelj; Eva Terčelj; Ajda Novak	106.23	2	108.23
5	9	New Zealand	Luuka Jones; Hannah Thomas; Courtney Williams	115.12	0	115.12
6	3	RCF	Kseniia Krylova; Ekaterina Perova; Alsu Minazova	109.43	6	115.43
7	7	Poland	Klaudia Zwolińska; Natalia Pacierpnik; Aleksandra Stach	119.41	2	121.41
8	4	Spain	Olatz Arregui; Laia Sorribes; Miren Lazkano	118.14	6	124.14
9	6	France	Marie-Zelia Lafont; Camille Prigent; Romane Prigent	105.92	50	155.92

== Men's K1 Teams ==
Spain entered the event as the reigning World Champions, whilst the Czech republic fielded a team including 2020 Olympic Champion Jiří Prskavec and 2021 overall World Cup Champion Vít Přindiš. The event was won by France in a clean run of 91.64 ahead of host nation Slovakia and Slovenia. The Czech Republic finished fourth after Prskavec had to paddle back for gate 10 following a near collision whilst weaving. Germany completed the course in the fastest raw time (90.99) but was awarded a 50-second penalty after they missed the last upstream gate in the windy conditions. 20 nations in total competed.

Rank	Bib	Nation	Canoeists	Results		
Rank	Bib	Nation	Canoeists	Time	Pen.	Total
1st place, gold medalist(s)	4	France	Boris Neveu; Mathieu Biazizzo; Benjamin Renia	91.64	0	91.64
2nd place, silver medalist(s)	18	Slovakia	Jakub Grigar; Martin Halčin; Adam Gonšenica	93.49	0	93.49
3rd place, bronze medalist(s)	12	Slovenia	Peter Kauzer; Martin Srabotnik; Niko Testen	92.84	2	94.84
4	2	Czech Republic	Jiří Prskavec; Vít Přindiš; Vavřinec Hradilek	96.64	0	96.64
5	8	Great Britain	Joe Clarke; Bradley Forbes-Cryans; Christopher Bowers	92.92	4	92.92
6	13	Sweden	Isak Öhrström; Erik Holmer; Fredrik Wahlen	96.33	2	98.33
7	7	Switzerland	Gelindo Chiarello; Lukas Werro; Martin Dougoud	96.44	2	98.44
8	10	Italy	Giovanni De Gennaro; Christian De Dionigi; Marcello Beda	95.14	4	99.14
9	11	Austria	Felix Oschmautz; Mario Leitner; Moritz Kremslehner	96.02	6	102.02
10	1	Spain	David Llorente; Joan Crespo; Pau Echaniz	94.92	8	102.92
11	5	RCF	Pavel Eigel; Sergei Maimistov; Nikita Gubenko	95.70	8	103.70
12	14	USA	Michal Smolen; Kaelin Friedenson; Jordan Sherman	100.78	4	104.78
13	17	Brazil	Guilherme Rodrigues; Pedro Gonçalves; Mathieu Desnos	108.99	8	116.99
14	15	Canada	Trevor Boyd; Mael Rivard; Jean-Benoit Lemay	107.47	14	121.47
15	16	Uzbekistan	Barkamol Mirzakhamdamov; Djanibek Temirgaliev; Alexandr Voroshilov	117.39	6	123.39
16	6	Germany	Hannes Aigner; Noah Hegge; Stefan Hengst	90.99	50	140.99
17	19	Lithuania	Vilius Rasimavicius; Gustas Malakauskas; Vejas Pranskunas	139.10	2	141.10
18	3	Poland	Krzysztof Majerczak; Rafał Polaczyk; Dariusz Popiela	95.97	56	151.97
19	9	New Zealand	Finn Butcher; Callum Gilbert; Zack Mutton	96.05	56	152.05
20	20	Serbia	Marko Dordevic; Milos Jevtic; Ognjen Dimitrijevic	144.32	70	214.32

== Women's C1 Teams ==
Reigning World Champions Australia did not compete, fielding a depleted team at the championships due to COVID-19 travel restrictions. This meant that Spain held the number 1 bib after their silver medal in 2019. The Czech Republic team of 2021 overall World Cup Champion Tereza Fišerová and sisters Gabriela and Martina Satková won with a total time of 110.43, their seventh consecutive top three finish in this event. Spain came second by 1.57 seconds, and the team representing the Russian Canoe Federation placed third.

Rank	Bib	Nation	Canoeists	Results		
Rank	Bib	Nation	Canoeists	Time	Pen.	Total
1st place, gold medalist(s)	2	Czech Republic	Tereza Fišerová; Gabriela Satková; Martina Satková	106.43	4	110.43
2nd place, silver medalist(s)	1	Spain	Núria Vilarrubla; Klara Olazabal; Miren Lazkano	108.00	4	112.00
3rd place, bronze medalist(s)	4	RCF	Alsu Minazova; Polina Mukhgaleeva; Zulfiia Sabitova	114.05	4	118.05
4	5	Great Britain	Mallory Franklin; Kimberley Woods; Bethan Forrow	112.33	6	118.33
5	3	Slovakia	Monika Škáchová; Simona Glejteková; Zuzana Paňková	113.38	6	119.38
6	8	France	Marjorie Delassus; Lucie Prioux; Angèle Hug	118.25	2	120.25
7	6	Slovenia	Alja Kozorog; Eva Alina Hočevar; Lea Novak	122.96	4	126.96
8	9	Poland	Aleksandra Stach; Klaudia Zwolińska; Katarzyna Liber	122.09	56	178.09
-	7	Italy	Marta Bertoncelli; Chiara Sabattini; Elena Micozzi	DNS		

== Men's C1 Teams ==
Host nation Slovakia entered the event as the distinct favourites, having won the C1 team title a record 9 consecutive times from 2009 to 2019 - the longest winning streak in any canoe slalom event. The French team of 2021 overall World Cup Champion Denis Gargaud Chanut, 2020 Olympian Martin Thomas and two-time U23 World Champion Nicolas Gestin won in a time of 95.34, just beating out the Czech Republic. The reigning champions had to settle for the bronze after an early mistake.

Rank	Bib	Nation	Canoeists	Results		
Rank	Bib	Nation	Canoeists	Time	Pen.	Total
1st place, gold medalist(s)	4	France	Martin Thomas; Denis Gargaud Chanut; Nicolas Gestin	93.34	2	95.34
2nd place, silver medalist(s)	8	Czech Republic	Lukáš Rohan; Václav Chaloupka; Vojtěch Heger	96.03	0	96.03
3rd place, bronze medalist(s)	1	Slovakia	Matej Beňuš; Marko Mirgorodský; Alexander Slafkovský	96.83	4	100.83
4	5	Poland	Grzegorz Hedwig; Kacper Sztuba; Michal Wiercioch	99.47	2	101.47
5	6	Slovenia	Benjamin Savšek; Luka Božič; Klemen Vidmar	100.00	2	102.00
6	9	USA	Zachary Lokken; Casey Eichfeld; Nathaniel Francis	102.10	0	102.10
7	3	RCF	Dmitrii Khramtsov; Kirill Setkin; Nikolai Shkliaruk	104.08	0	104.08
8	11	Italy	Roberto Colazingari; Flavio Micozzi; Raffaello Ivaldi	97.65	8	105.65
9	2	Spain	Ander Elosegi; Miquel Travé; Luis Fernández	104.24	4	108.24
10	7	Great Britain	Adam Burgess; David Florence; Peter Linksted	99.69	10	109.69
11	10	Uzbekistan	Ismoilbek Abdumanapov; Abubakir Bukanov; Alibek Temirgaliev	118.10	8	126.10
