= 2022 ICF Canoe Slalom World Championships – Men's K1 team =

Men's kayak teams at the 2022 ICF Canoe Slalom World Championships
- Venue: Augsburg Eiskanal
- Location: Augsburg, Germany
- Dates: 27 July 2022
- Competitors: 90 from 30 nations
- Teams: 30

Medalists
gold medal	Hannes Aigner; Noah Hegge; Stefan Hengst	Germany
silver medal	Joseph Clarke; Christopher Bowers; Bradley Forbes-Cryans	Great Britain
bronze medal	Boris Neveu; Titouan Castryck; Malo Quéméneur	France

The men's kayak team event at the 2022 ICF Canoe Slalom World Championships took place on 27 July 2022 at the Augsburg Eiskanal in Augsburg.

== Competition format ==
Team events use a single run format with the team with the fastest time including penalties awarded gold. Teams consist of three paddlers from the same country.

Penalties are accumulated for each athlete, such that a team can incur a total of 150 seconds of penalties on a single gate (if all three miss it) or 6 seconds (if all three touch it). The time begins when the first paddler crosses the start beam and ends when the last one crosses the finish beam. All three paddlers must cross the finish line within 15 seconds of each other or else incur an additional 50-second penalty.

Team events are generally contested on the same gate setup as the qualification heats of the individual events.

== Results ==
Rank	Bib	Country	Athletes	Result		
Rank	Bib	Country	Athletes	Time	Pen	Total
1st place, gold medalist(s)	14	Germany	Hannes Aigner; Noah Hegge; Stefan Hengst	91.90	0	91.90
2nd place, silver medalist(s)	5	Great Britain	Joseph Clarke; Christopher Bowers; Bradley Forbes-Cryans	91.68	2	93.68
3rd place, bronze medalist(s)	1	France	Boris Neveu; Titouan Castryck; Malo Quéméneur	93.67	2	95.67
4	4	Czech Republic	Jiří Prskavec; Vít Přindiš; Ondřej Tunka	93.84	2	95.84
5	2	Slovakia	Jakub Grigar; Adam Gonšenica; Martin Halčin	95.13	2	97.13
6	6	Sweden	Isak Öhrström; Fredrik Wahlén; Erik Holmer	98.80	0	98.80
7	23	Australia	Lucien Delfour; Timothy Anderson; Benjamin Pope	94.88	4	98.88
8	13	Canada	Alex Baldoni; Trevor Boyd; Maël Rivard	99.51	2	101.51
9	16	Poland	Michał Pasiut; Jakub Brzeziński; Dariusz Popiela	95.89	6	101.89
10	9	Austria	Felix Oschmautz; Mario Leitner; Paul Preisl	99.89	2	101.89
11	10	Spain	Joan Crespo; Manuel Ochoa; Miquel Travé	97.89	6	103.89
12	19	China	Quan Xin; Huang Liman; Lyu Luhui	103.68	4	107.68
13	11	United States	Tyler Westfall; Kaelin Friedenson; Joshua Joseph	101.73	6	107.73
14	12	Brazil	Kauã da Silva; Mathieu Desnos; Guilherme Rodrigues	103.86	6	109.86
15	29	Croatia	Ren Korpes; Roko Bengeri; Thomas Ukalovic	100.72	10	110.72
16	28	Japan	Kazuya Adachi; Yusuke Muto; Yuuki Tanaka	97.04	14	111.04
17	25	Belgium	Maxime Aubertin; Gabriel De Coster; Victor Hennin	103.24	10	113.24
18	24	Ireland	Alistair McCreery; Noel Hendrick; Samuel Curtis	109.46	12	121.46
19	21	Turkey	Mustafa Arda Acar; Tarık Tuğcu; Yusuf Ertek	114.66	14	128.66
20	22	North Macedonia	Angel Petrushev; Stefan Ribarski; Borche Mirchevski	115.44	14	129.44
21	20	Romania	Thibaud Lacour; Matteo-Alexander Olar; Patrick Kozma	126.10	10	136.10
22	8	Italy	Giovanni De Gennaro; Marcello Beda; Zeno Ivaldi	92.92	54	146.92
23	7	Switzerland	Gelindo Chiarello; Lukas Werro; Martin Dougoud	98.86	52	150.86
24	17	New Zealand	Finn Butcher; Callum Gilbert; Zack Mutton	97.86	60	157.86
25	26	Latvia	Mārtiņš Plaudis; Ritvars Celmiņš; Edgars Gravitis	112.22	66	178.22
26	15	Lithuania	Mantas Atmanavičius; Vilius Rasimavičius; Vėjas Pranskūnas	112.54	66	178.54
27	18	Serbia	Miloš Jevtić; Marko Đorđević; Vuk Bazic	115.29	66	181.29
28	3	Slovenia	Peter Kauzer; Martin Srabotnik; Vid Kuder Marušič	102.28	110	212.28
29	27	Ukraine	Oleksandr Fedorenko; Serhii Sovko; Artem Ivchenko	112.88	164	276.88
-	30	India	Hitesh Kewat; Pradhyumna Singh Rathod; Dheeraj Keer	DNS		
