= 2021 Canoe Slalom World Cup =

The 2021 Canoe Slalom World Cup was a series of four races in several canoeing and kayaking categories organized by the International Canoe Federation (ICF). It was the 35th edition.

== Calendar ==
The series opened with World Cup Race 1 in Prague, Czech Republic (11–13 June) and closed with the World Cup Final in Pau, France (10–12 September).

Label	Venue	Date
World Cup Race 1	(Czech Republic) Prague	11–13 June
World Cup Race 2	(Germany) Markkleeberg	18–20 June
World Cup Race 3	(Spain) La Seu	3–5 September
World Cup Final	(France) Pau	10–12 September

== Standings ==
The winner of each race was awarded 60 points (with double points awarded for the World Cup Final). Points for lower places differed from one category to another. Every participant was guaranteed at least 2 points for participation and 5 points for qualifying for the semifinal run.

=== C1 men ===
Pos	Athlete	CZE (Czech Republic)	GER (Germany)	ESP (Spain)	FRA (France)	Points
1	Denis Gargaud Chanut (FRA)	18	1	8	1	243
2	Benjamin Savšek (SLO)	3	3	29	2	217
3	Miquel Travé (ESP)	12	11	1	6	207
4	Alexander Slafkovský (SVK)	16	4	10	4	199
5	Marko Mirgorodský (SVK)	4	5	5	11	198
6	Luka Božič (SLO)	34	10	4	3	182
7	Franz Anton (GER)	25	16	3	7	172
8	David Florence (GBR)	2	21	2	23	170
9	Matej Beňuš (SVK)	5	8	16	15	165
10	Vojtěch Heger (CZE)	15	13	17	10	152
11	Václav Chaloupka (CZE)	28	24	11	5	146
12	Nicolas Gestin (FRA)	19	39	9	8	138
13	Zachary Lokken (USA)	8	30	20	17	126
14	Matija Marinić (CRO)	10	14		13	123
15	Lukáš Rohan (CZE)	1			12	122
16	Thomas Koechlin (SUI)	7			9	112
17	Ander Elosegi (ESP)	31	20	14	19	102
18	Roberto Colazingari (ITA)	13	19	26	24	101
19	Flavio Micozzi (ITA)			6	16	96
20	Jake Cochrane (IRL)	29	28	18	18	91

=== C1 women ===
Pos	Athlete	CZE (Czech Republic)	GER (Germany)	ESP (Spain)	FRA (France)	Points
1	Tereza Fišerová (CZE)	3	2	2	1	280
2	Jessica Fox (AUS)	1	4	1	2	276
3	Elena Apel (GER)	9	10	24	3	187
4	Núria Vilarrubla (ESP)	21	20	3	5	183
5	Angèle Hug (FRA)	5	13	10	11	172
6	Klara Olazabal (ESP)	12	5	9	13	171
7	Miren Lazkano (ESP)	28	14	6	7	160
8	Ana Sátila (BRA)	30	17	21	4	145
8	Noemie Fox (AUS)	8	8	23	18	145
10	Martina Satková (CZE)	22	11	17	14	137
11	Monika Škáchová (SVK)	19	32	7	10	134
12	Mallory Franklin (GBR)	4	7	4		132
13	Lucie Prioux (FRA)	29	12	16	12	127
14	Viktoriia Us (UKR)	6			6	126
15	Alja Kozorog (SLO)	14	31	11	15	119
16	Marjorie Delassus (FRA)	13	26	22	16	118
17	Andrea Herzog (GER)	2	1			115
18	Lena Stöcklin (GER)		16	29	9	106
19	Zuzana Paňková (SVK)			18	8	101
20	Mònica Dòria (AND)	24	30	5	27	88

=== K1 men ===
Pos	Athlete	CZE (Czech Republic)	GER (Germany)	ESP (Spain)	FRA (France)	Points
1	Vít Přindiš (CZE)	7	6	1	1	263
2	Peter Kauzer (SLO)	9	8	3	2	239
3	Giovanni De Gennaro (ITA)	2	4	9	7	220
4	Felix Oschmautz (AUT)	24	2	2	10	207
5	Boris Neveu (FRA)	21	3	5	4	205
6	Joseph Clarke (GBR)	4	32	16	3	186
7	Mathieu Biazizzo (FRA)	3	24	35	5	167
8	Jakub Grigar (SVK)	6	1	20	28	161
9	Michal Smolen (USA)	5	7	19	22	156
10	Christopher Bowers (GBR)	14	17	12	16	150
11	Noah Hegge (GER)	26		10	6	141
12	Benjamin Renia (FRA)	17	16		8	137
13	David Llorente (ESP)	8	38	17	15	135
14	Michał Pasiut (POL)	11	27	11	21	134
15	Martin Srabotnik (SLO)	29	18	8	20	133
16	Finn Butcher (NZL)	22	22	14	19	129
17	Erik Holmer (SWE)	16	9	25	25	128
18	Joan Crespo (ESP)	43	13	7	27	111
19	Ondřej Tunka (CZE)		23	26	13	105
20	Mathieu Desnos (BRA)	39	44	18	12	101

=== K1 women ===
Pos	Athlete	CZE (Czech Republic)	GER (Germany)	ESP (Spain)	FRA (France)	Points
1	Jessica Fox (AUS)	3	1	1	1	290
2	Luuka Jones (NZL)	5	10	7	5	206
3	Eva Terčelj (SLO)	11	4	12	4	201
4	Maialen Chourraut (ESP)	6	7	11	8	190
4	Elena Apel (GER)	7	3	6	14	190
6	Urša Kragelj (SLO)	12	6	26	3	186
7	Camille Prigent (FRA)	8	8	20	6	183
8	Eliška Mintálová (SVK)	22	15	3	7	179
9	Klaudia Zwolińska (POL)	1	19	15	11	176
10	Natalia Pacierpnik (POL)	2	12	22	13	167
11	Ana Sátila (BRA)	14	9	5	17	161
12	Kateřina Minařík Kudějová (CZE)	16		21	2	159
13	Romane Prigent (FRA)	15	13	9	16	148
14	Marie-Zélia Lafont (FRA)	13	52	13	12	124
15	Evy Leibfarth (USA)	28	11	10	19	123
16	Mònica Dòria (AND)	20	37	14	10	122
17	Martina Wegman (NED)	27	14	16	20	113
18	Jana Dukátová (SVK)	19	18	19	24	107
19	Ricarda Funk (GER)	10	2			89
20	Ajda Novak (SLO)	18	5	36	29	85

=== Extreme slalom men ===
Pos	Athlete	CZE (Czech Republic)	GER (Germany)	ESP (Spain)	FRA (France)	Points
1	Vít Přindiš (CZE)	1	2	33	2	227
2	Stefan Hengst (GER)	7	3	7	5	190
3	Mario Leitner (AUT)	4	10	2	6	187
4	Finn Butcher (NZL)	2	11	13	7	141
5	Joan Crespo (ESP)	14	16	17	1	138
6	Ondřej Tunka (CZE)	3	8	36	9	115
7	Christian De Dionigi (ITA)		26	18	3	108
8	Joe Clarke (GBR)	5	4	37	44	91
9	Lukas Werro (SUI)				4	90
10	Pedro Gonçalves (BRA)	30	1		19	72

=== Extreme slalom women ===
Pos	Athlete	CZE (Czech Republic)	GER (Germany)	ESP (Spain)	FRA (France)	Points
1	Caroline Trompeter (GER)	5	2	4	4	230
2	Martina Wegman (NED)	8	T	11	1	164
3	Ana Sátila (BRA)			3	2	160
4	Jessica Fox (AUS)			8	3	125
5	Antonia Oschmautz (AUT)	4	11	29	8	114
6	Lucie Nesnídalová (CZE)	17	6	36	6	111
7	Kseniia Krylova (RUS)	3	1			110
8	Corinna Kuhnle (AUT)	1	5			100
9	Fiona Pennie (GBR)	2	7	25	17	97
10	Viktoriia Us (UKR)				5	80

== Points ==
- World Cup points were awarded based on the results of each race at each event as follows:

Position	1st	2nd	3rd	4th	5th	6th	7th	8th	9th	10th
C1 M	60	55	50	46	44	42	40	38	36	34
C1 W	60	55	50	46	44	42	40	38	36	34
K1 M	60	55	50	44	43	42	41	40	39	38
K1 W	60	55	50	46	44	42	40	38	36	34
Extreme slalom	60	55	50	45	40	35	30	25	19	17

== Results ==
=== World Cup Race 1 ===
11–13 June in Prague, Czech Republic.

Event	Gold	Score	Silver	Score	Bronze	Score
C1 men	Lukáš Rohan (CZE)	97.20	David Florence (GBR)	97.44	Benjamin Savšek (SLO)	99.80
C1 women	Jessica Fox (AUS)	105.15	Andrea Herzog (GER)	109.98	Tereza Fišerová (CZE)	110.76
K1 men	Jiří Prskavec (CZE)	90.42	Giovanni De Gennaro (ITA)	90.87	Mathieu Biazizzo (FRA)	92.01
K1 women	Klaudia Zwolińska (POL)	100.58	Natalia Pacierpnik (POL)	102.49	Jessica Fox (AUS)	102.82
Extreme slalom men	Vít Přindiš (CZE)		Finn Butcher (NZL)		Ondřej Tunka (CZE)	
Extreme slalom women	Corinna Kuhnle (AUT)		Fiona Pennie (GBR)		Kseniia Krylova (RUS)	

=== World Cup Race 2 ===
18–20 June in Markkleeberg, Germany.

Event	Gold	Score	Silver	Score	Bronze	Score
C1 men	Denis Gargaud Chanut (FRA)	94.75	Sideris Tasiadis (GER)	96.87	Benjamin Savšek (SLO)	99.59
C1 women	Andrea Herzog (GER)	103.91	Tereza Fišerová (CZE)	108.26	Nadine Weratschnig (AUT)	112.80
K1 men	Jakub Grigar (SVK)	88.91	Felix Oschmautz (AUT)	90.92	Boris Neveu (FRA)	91.86
K1 women	Jessica Fox (AUS)	96.76	Ricarda Funk (GER)	100.28	Elena Apel (GER)	103.00
Extreme slalom men	Pedro Gonçalves (BRA)		Vít Přindiš (CZE)		Stefan Hengst (GER)	
Extreme slalom women	Kseniia Krylova (RUS)		Caroline Trompeter (GER)		Amálie Hilgertová (CZE)	

=== World Cup Race 3 ===
3–5 September in La Seu, Spain.

Event	Gold	Score	Silver	Score	Bronze	Score
C1 men	Miquel Travé (ESP)	88.81	David Florence (GBR)	89.13	Franz Anton (GER)	90.42
C1 women	Jessica Fox (AUS)	93.07	Tereza Fišerová (CZE)	99.39	Núria Vilarrubla (ESP)	100.43
K1 men	Vít Přindiš (CZE)	82.76	Felix Oschmautz (AUT)	83.12	Peter Kauzer (SLO)	83.26
K1 women	Jessica Fox (AUS)	89.92	Mallory Franklin (GBR)	93.58	Eliška Mintálová (SVK)	97.28
Extreme slalom men	Boris Neveu (FRA)		Mario Leitner (AUT)		Manuel Munsch (SUI)	
Extreme slalom women	Martina Satková (CZE)		Luuka Jones (NZL)		Ana Sátila (BRA)	

=== World Cup Final ===
10–12 September in Pau, France.

Event	Gold	Score	Silver	Score	Bronze	Score
C1 men	Denis Gargaud Chanut (FRA)	101.40	Benjamin Savšek (SLO)	101.56	Luka Božič (SLO)	103.09
C1 women	Tereza Fišerová (CZE)	111.79	Jessica Fox (AUS)	113.24	Elena Apel (GER)	113.62
K1 men	Vít Přindiš (CZE)	95.08	Peter Kauzer (SLO)	95.63	Joe Clarke (GBR)	96.33
K1 women	Jessica Fox (AUS)	106.74	Kateřina Minařík Kudějová (CZE)	107.46	Urša Kragelj (SLO)	108.28
Extreme slalom men	Joan Crespo (ESP)		Vít Přindiš (CZE)		Christian De Dionigi (ITA)	
Extreme slalom women	Martina Wegman (NED)		Ana Sátila (BRA)		Jessica Fox (AUS)	
