= Miquel Travé =

Spanish slalom canoeist

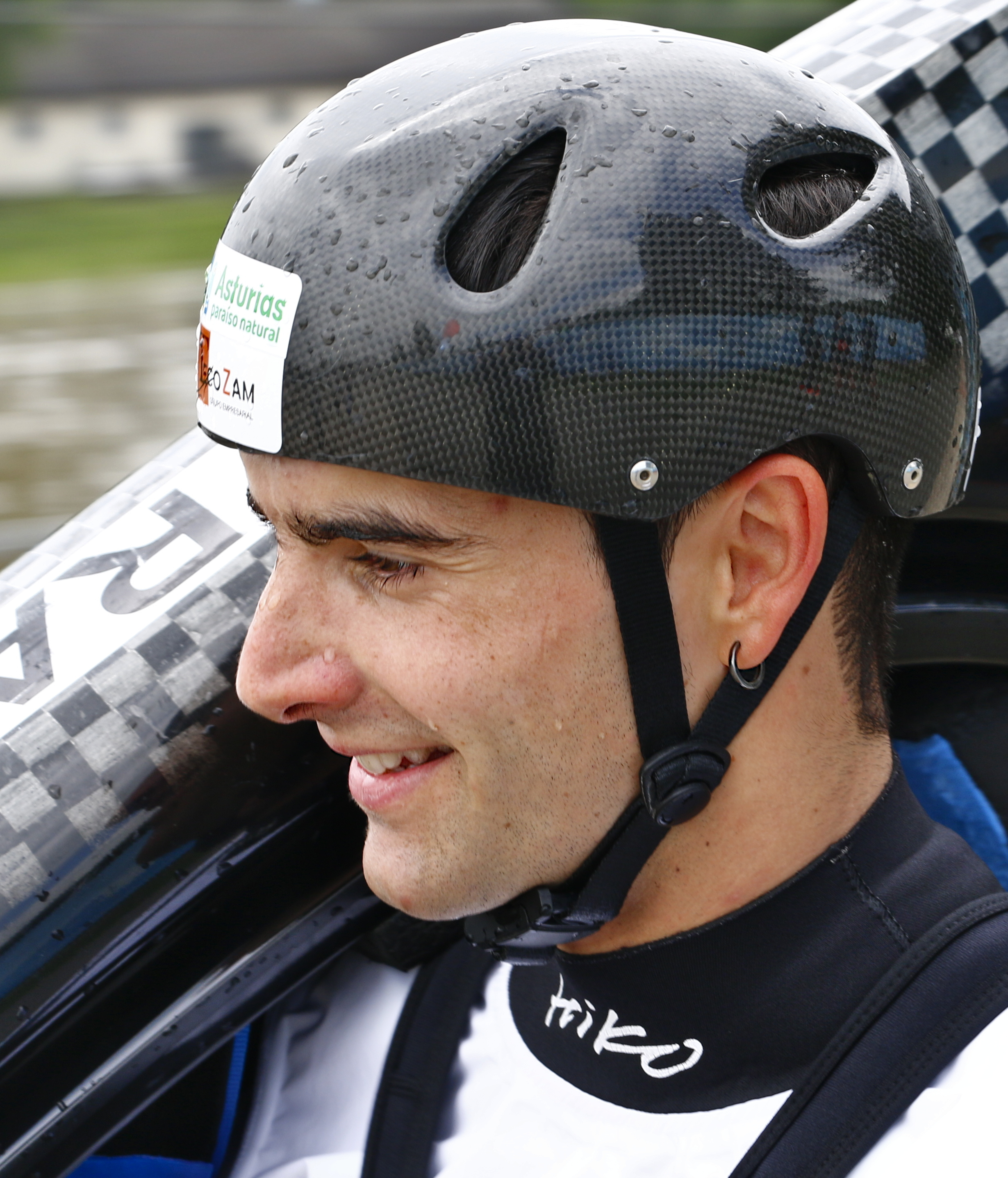
- Travé in 2024

Personal information
- Full name: Miquel Travé Pujal
- Born: 6 January 2000 (age 26) La Seu d'Urgell, Spain

Sport
- Country: Spain
- Sport: Canoe slalom
- Event: C1, K1
- Club: Cadi Canoe-Kayac
Medal record
Men's canoe slalom
Representing Spain
World Championships
Gold medal – first place	2026 Oklahoma City	C1
Silver medal – second place	2019 La Seu d'Urgell	C1 team
European Games
Gold medal – first place	2023 Kraków	K1 team
Silver medal – second place	2023 Kraków	C1
European Championships
Gold medal – first place	2025 Vaires-sur-Marne	C1
Bronze medal – third place	2022 Liptovský Mikuláš	C1
Bronze medal – third place	2022 Liptovský Mikuláš	C1 team
Bronze medal – third place	2025 Vaires-sur-Marne	K1 team
U23 World Championships
Silver medal – second place	2022 Ivrea	K1 team
U23 European Championships
Gold medal – first place	2023 Bratislava	K1
Gold medal – first place	2023 Bratislava	K1 team
Silver medal – second place	2022 České Budějovice	K1
Silver medal – second place	2022 České Budějovice	K1 team
Bronze medal – third place	2021 Solkan	K1 team
Junior World Championships
Gold medal – first place	2018 Ivrea	C1
Silver medal – second place	2017 Bratislava	C1
Silver medal – second place	2017 Bratislava	C1 team
Silver medal – second place	2017 Bratislava	K1 team
Junior European Championships
Gold medal – first place	2018 Bratislava	C1
Gold medal – first place	2018 Bratislava	K1
Silver medal – second place	2017 Hohenlimburg	C1 team

Miquel Travé Pujal (born 6 January 2000) is a Spanish slalom canoeist who has competed at the international level since 2016.

Travé won two medals at the ICF Canoe Slalom World Championships with a gold in the C1 event in 2026 and a silver in the C1 team event in 2019.

He also won six medals (2-1-3) at the European Championships including a gold and a silver at the 2023 European Games in Kraków.

He competed at the 2024 Summer Olympics, finishing 5th in the C1 event and 25th in kayak cross.

Travé won four medals at the Junior World Championships, with one gold (C1: 2018) and three silver (C1: 2017, K1 team: 2017, C1 team: 2017).

At the 2018 European Junior and U23 Canoe Slalom Championships in Bratislava, Travé won both the K1 and C1 events in the junior category. He was the first male paddler in history to win both the K1 and C1 events at the same international level event. Miquel finished third in the overall standings of the 2021 World Cup, after winning the third round on his home course in La Seu d'Urgell.

== Results ==
=== World Cup individual podiums ===
Season	Date	Venue	Position	Event
2021	5 September 2021	La Seu d'Urgell	1st	C1
2022	4 September 2022	La Seu d'Urgell	2nd	C1
2023	6 October 2023	Vaires-sur-Marne	3rd	C1
2024	21 September 2024	La Seu d'Urgell	1st	C1
2025	14 June 2025	Pau	3rd	C1
2025	6 September 2025	Augsburg	3rd	C1
2026	12 September 2026	La Seu d'Urgell	1st	C1

=== Complete World Cup results ===
Year	WC1	WC2	WC3	WC4	WC5	Points	Position
2016	Ivrea (Italy)	La Seu (Spain)	Pau (France)	Prague (Czech Republic); 34	Tacen (Slovenia); 28	20	47th
2017	Prague (Czech Republic); 17	Augsburg (Germany)	Markkleeberg (Germany); 37	Ivrea (Italy)	La Seu (Spain); 33	30	38th
2018	Liptovský Mikuláš (Slovakia); 14	Kraków (Poland); 57	Augsburg (Germany)	Tacen (Slovenia)	La Seu (Spain); 9	103	23rd
2019	Lee Valley (United Kingdom); 31	Bratislava (Slovakia); 20	Tacen (Slovenia)	Markkleeberg (Germany); 29	Prague (Czech Republic)	32	43rd
2020	Tacen (Slovenia)	Pau (France); 4				N/A^{[a]}	
2021	Prague (Czech Republic); 12	Markkleeberg (Germany); 11	La Seu (Spain); 1	Pau (France); 6		207	3rd
2022	Prague (Czech Republic)	Kraków (Poland); 24	Tacen (Slovenia); 16	Pau (France); 5	La Seu (Spain); 2	198	6th
2023	Augsburg (Germany)	Prague (Czech Republic); 5	Tacen (Slovenia)	La Seu (Spain); 6	Pau (France); 3	186	7th
2024	Augsburg (Germany)	Prague (Czech Republic); 19	Kraków (Poland); 4	Ivrea (Italy)	La Seu (Spain); 1	190	8th
2025	La Seu (Spain); 8	Pau (France); 3	Prague (Czech Republic); 17	Tacen (Slovenia); 7	Augsburg (Germany); 3	254	3rd

Notes
^{a} No overall rankings were determined by the ICF, with only two races possible due to the COVID-19 pandemic.

=== Complete Championship Results ===
Year	Level	Venue	Event	Result
2016	Junior European	(Slovenia) Solkan	C1 team	8th
2016	Junior European	(Slovenia) Solkan	C1	9th
2016	U23 World	(Poland) Kraków	C1 team	8th
2016	Junior World	(Poland) Kraków	C1	22nd
2017	Junior European	(Germany) Hohenlimburg	C1 team	2nd
2017	Junior European	(Germany) Hohenlimburg	K1 team	11th
2017	Junior European	(Germany) Hohenlimburg	C1	4th
2017	Junior European	(Germany) Hohenlimburg	K1	6th
2017	Junior World	(Slovakia) Bratislava	C1 team	2nd
2017	Junior World	(Slovakia) Bratislava	K1 team	2nd
2017	Junior World	(Slovakia) Bratislava	C1	2nd
2017	Junior World	(Slovakia) Bratislava	K1	4th
2017	European	(Slovenia) Tacen	C1 team	10th
2017	European	(Slovenia) Tacen	C1	24th
2017	World	(France) Pau	C1 team	6th
2017	World	(France) Pau	C1	15th
2018	Junior European	(Slovakia) Bratislava	C1 team	5th
2018	Junior European	(Slovakia) Bratislava	K1 team	4th
2018	Junior European	(Slovakia) Bratislava	C1	1st
2018	Junior European	(Slovakia) Bratislava	K1	1st
2018	Junior World	(Italy) Ivrea	C1 team	4th
2018	Junior World	(Italy) Ivrea	K1 team	8th
2018	Junior World	(Italy) Ivrea	C1	1st
2018	Junior World	(Italy) Ivrea	K1	13th
2018	U23 World	(Italy) Ivrea	C2 mixed	9th
2018	European	(Czech Republic) Prague	C1 team	7th
2018	European	(Czech Republic) Prague	C1	24th
2018	World	(Brazil) Rio de Janeiro	C1 team	7th
2018	World	(Brazil) Rio de Janeiro	C1	34th

Year	Level	Venue	Event	Result
2019	U23 European	(Slovakia) Liptovský Mikuláš	C1 team	8th
2019	U23 European	(Slovakia) Liptovský Mikuláš	C1	12th
2019	U23 World	(Poland) Kraków	C1 team	10th
2019	U23 World	(Poland) Kraków	C1	6th
2019	European	(France) Pau	C1 team	DNS
2019	European	(France) Pau	C1	20th
2019	World	(Spain) La Seu d'Urgell	C1 team	2nd
2019	World	(Spain) La Seu d'Urgell	C1	17th
2020	European	(Czech Republic) Prague	C1 team	7th
2020	European	(Czech Republic) Prague	C1	18th
2021	U23 European	(Slovenia) Solkan	C1 team	6th
2021	U23 European	(Slovenia) Solkan	K1 team	3rd
2021	U23 European	(Slovenia) Solkan	C1	6th
2021	U23 European	(Slovenia) Solkan	K1	16th
2021	U23 World	(Slovenia) Tacen	C1 team	5th
2021	U23 World	(Slovenia) Tacen	K1 team	13th
2021	U23 World	(Slovenia) Tacen	C1	4th
2021	U23 World	(Slovenia) Tacen	K1	12th
2021	European	(Italy) Ivrea	C1 team	7th
2021	European	(Italy) Ivrea	C1	21st
2021	World	(Slovakia) Bratislava	C1 team	9th
2021	World	(Slovakia) Bratislava	C1	12th
2021	World	(Slovakia) Bratislava	Extreme	41st
