= Jules Bernardet =

French slalom canoeist (born 2000)

Personal information
- Nationality: French
- Born: 2000 (age 25–26)

Sport
- Country: France
- Sport: Canoe slalom
- Event: C1, Mixed C2
Medal record
Men's canoe slalom
Representing France
World Championships
Gold medal – first place	2023 London	C1 team
Silver medal – second place	2026 Oklahoma City	C1 team
European Championships
Gold medal – first place	2026 Ivrea	C1 team
U23 World Championships
Gold medal – first place	2022 Ivrea	C1 team
Gold medal – first place	2023 Kraków	C1
Gold medal – first place	2023 Kraków	C1 team
Silver medal – second place	2021 Tacen	C1
Bronze medal – third place	2021 Tacen	C1 team
U23 European Championships
Gold medal – first place	2021 Solkan	C1 team
Bronze medal – third place	2021 Solkan	C1
Junior World Championships
Gold medal – first place	2018 Ivrea	C1 team
Silver medal – second place	2018 Ivrea	Mixed C2
Junior European Championships
Silver medal – second place	2018 Bratislava	C1 team

Jules Bernardet (born 2000) is a French slalom canoeist who has competed at the international level since 2018.

He won two medals in the C1 team event at the ICF Canoe Slalom World Championships with a gold in 2023 and a silver in 2026.

He also won a gold medal in the C1 team event at the 2026 European Championships in Ivrea.

== World Cup individual podiums ==
Season	Date	Venue	Position	Event
2020	18 October 2020	Tacen	3rd	C1
2023	10 June 2023	Prague	3rd	C1
2024	15 June 2024	Kraków	1st	C1
