= 2021 European Junior and U23 Canoe Slalom Championships =

- Location: Solkan, Slovenia
- Dates: 19 to 22 August 2021

The 2021 European Junior and U23 Canoe Slalom Championships took place in Solkan, Slovenia from 19 to 22 August 2021 under the auspices of the European Canoe Association (ECA). It was the 23rd edition of the competition for Juniors (U18) and the 19th edition for the Under 23 category. Solkan hosted the championships for the 5th time.

A total of 20 medal events were held. It was the first time that Extreme slalom events were part of the European Junior and U23 Championships.

== Medal summary ==
=== Men ===
==== Canoe ====
===== Junior =====
Event	Gold		Silver		Bronze	
C1	Mewen Debliquy; France	96.33	Adam Král; Czech Republic	99.07	Tanguy Adisson; France	100.67
C1 team	France; Tanguy Adisson; Mewen Debliquy; Quentin Maillefer	116.70	Czech Republic; Adam Král; Martin Kratochvíl; Matyáš Říha	117.27	Italy; Martino Barzon; Marino Spagnol; Elio Maiutto	124.98

===== U23 =====
Event	Gold		Silver		Bronze	
C1	Václav Chaloupka; Czech Republic	91.63	Vojtěch Heger; Czech Republic	93.22	Jules Bernardet; France	93.81
C1 team	France; Jules Bernardet; Alexis Bobon; Yohann Senechault	112.09	Czech Republic; Václav Chaloupka; Vojtěch Heger; Matyáš Lhota	112.47	Germany; Lennard Tuchscherer; Paul Seumel; Hannes Seumel	114.47

==== Kayak ====
===== Junior =====
Event	Gold		Silver		Bronze	
K1	Martin Rudorfer; Czech Republic	91.79	Egor Smirnov; Russia	92.00	Jan Ločnikar; Slovenia	93.72
K1 team	Russia; Egor Smirnov; Ivan Kozlov; Konstantin Kazakov	113.33	Great Britain; Thomas Mayer; Sam Leaver; Cody Brown	114.06	Slovakia; Ondrej Macúš; Ilja Buran; Filip Stanko	114.09
Extreme Canoe Slalom	Martin Rudorfer; Czech Republic		Edouard Chenal; France		Michał Ciągło; Poland	

===== U23 =====
Event	Gold		Silver		Bronze	
K1	Jakub Krejčí; Czech Republic	88.47	Anatole Delassus; France	88.60	Christopher Bowers; Great Britain	88.61
K1 team	France; Malo Quéméneur; Anatole Delassus; Simon Hene	105.01	Italy; Davide Ghisetti; Jakob Weger; Marco Romano	105.38	Spain; Pau Echaniz; Miquel Travé; Manuel Ochoa	105.86
Extreme Canoe Slalom	Jakub Krejčí; Czech Republic		Dimitri Marx; Switzerland		Manuel Ochoa; Spain	

=== Women ===
==== Canoe ====
===== Junior =====
Event	Gold		Silver		Bronze	
C1	Zuzana Paňková; Slovakia	106.87	Elena Micozzi; Italy	111.08	Marina Novysh; Russia	112.97
C1 team	Czech Republic; Tereza Kneblová; Klára Kneblová; Lucie Doležalová	135.06	Russia; Marina Novysh; Taisiia Logacheva; Karina Fedchenko	147.19	Germany; Lucie Krech; Lena Götze; Paulina Pirro	149.56

===== U23 =====
Event	Gold		Silver		Bronze	
C1	Tereza Fišerová; Czech Republic	103.56	Bethan Forrow; Great Britain	106.34	Monica Doria Vilarrubla; Andorra	106.61
C1 team	Czech Republic; Martina Satková; Gabriela Satková; Tereza Fišerová	124.09	Spain; Klara Olazabal; Ainhoa Lameiro; Clara González	127.94	Poland; Aleksandra Stach; Klaudia Zwolińska; Katarzyna Liber	130.73

==== Kayak ====
===== Junior =====
Event	Gold		Silver		Bronze	
K1	Zuzana Paňková; Slovakia	102.02	Ivana Chlebová; Slovakia	104.94	Emma Vuitton; France	105.42
K1 team	Slovakia; Zuzana Paňková; Ivana Chlebová; Amy Mary Ryan	128.31	France; Emma Vuitton; Romane Régnier; Clara Delahaye	128.63	Slovenia; Naja Pinterič; Helena Domajnko; Ula Skok	129.41
Extreme Canoe Slalom	Tereza Kneblová; Czech Republic		Dominika Danek; Poland		Zuzana Paňková; Slovakia	

===== U23 =====
Event	Gold		Silver		Bronze	
K1	Klaudia Zwolińska; Poland	99.58	Soňa Stanovská; Slovakia	103.48	Tereza Fišerová; Czech Republic	103.98
K1 team	Slovakia; Michaela Haššová; Soňa Stanovská; Kristína Ďurecová	122.21	Great Britain; Nikita Setchell; Phoebe Spicer; Lois Leaver	122.88	Germany; Franziska Hanke; Nele Gosse; Stella Mehlhorn	124.14
Extreme Canoe Slalom	Tereza Fišerová; Czech Republic		Nikita Setchell; Great Britain		Alsu Minazova; Russia	

== Medal table ==
* Host nation (Slovenia)

Rank	Nation	Gold	Silver	Bronze	Total
1	Czech Republic (CZE)	10	4	1	15
2	France (FRA)	4	3	3	10
3	Slovakia (SVK)	4	2	2	8
4	Russia (RUS)	1	2	2	5
5	Poland (POL)	1	1	2	4
6	Great Britain (GBR)	0	4	1	5
7	Italy (ITA)	0	2	1	3
8	Spain (ESP)	0	1	2	3
9	Switzerland (SUI)	0	1	0	1
10	Germany (GER)	0	0	3	3
11	Slovenia (SLO)*	0	0	2	2
12	Andorra (AND)	0	0	1	1
Totals (12 entries)		20	20	20	60
