= Aleksandra Góra =

Polish canoeist (born 2000)

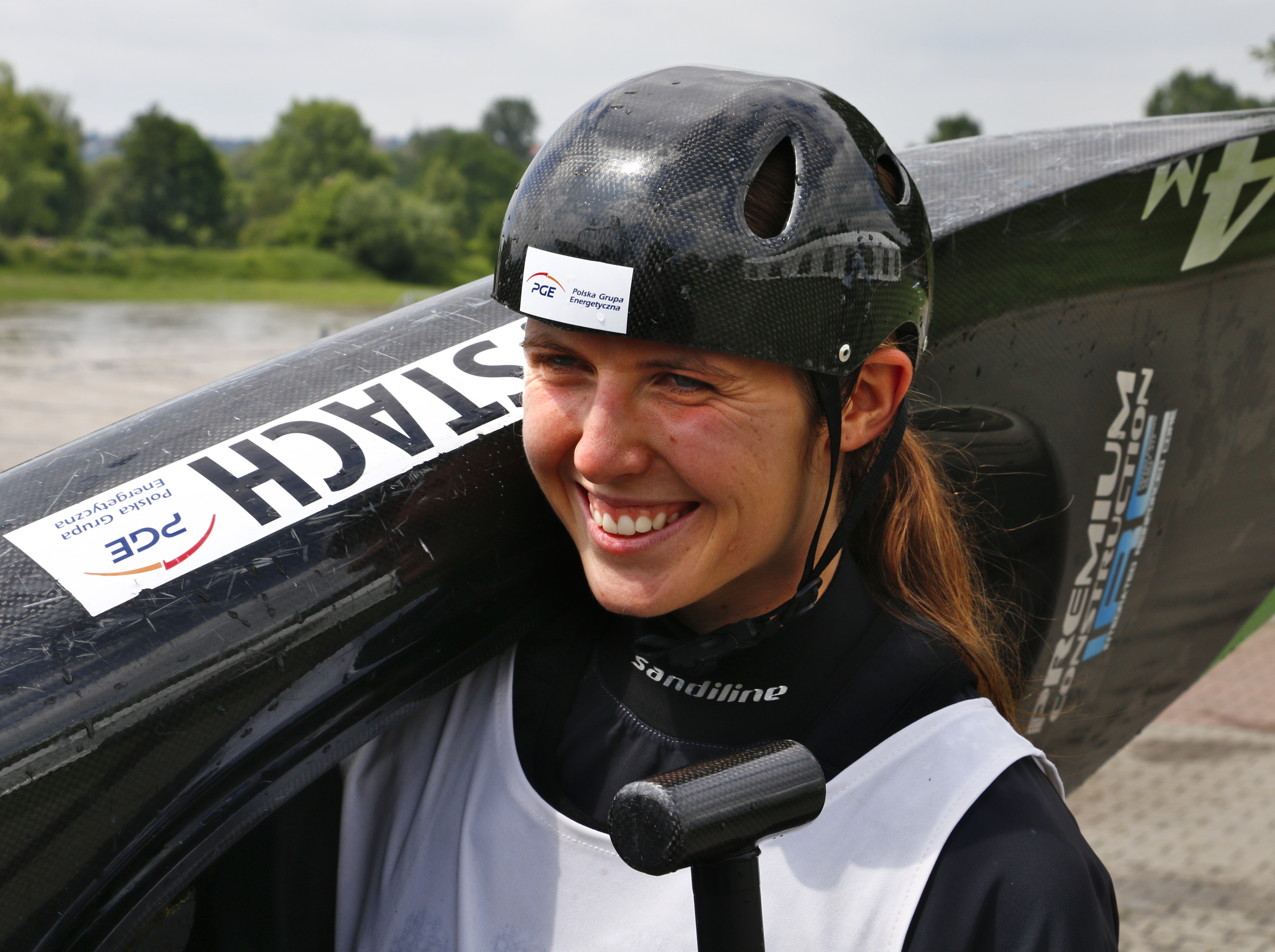
- Aleksandra Stach (2024)

Personal information
- Nationality: Polish
- Born: 6 January 2000 (age 26)

Sport
- Country: Poland
- Sport: Canoe slalom
- Event(s): C1, K1, Kayak cross, Mixed C2
Medal record
Women's canoe slalom
Representing Poland
World Championships
Gold medal – first place	2018 Rio de Janeiro	Mixed C2
Silver medal – second place	2019 La Seu d'Urgell	Mixed C2
U23 European Championships
Bronze medal – third place	2021 Solkan	C1 team

Aleksandra Góra (née Stach, born 6 January 2000) is a Polish slalom canoeist who has competed at the international level since 2015.

She won two medals in the mixed C2 event at the ICF Canoe Slalom World Championships with a gold in 2018 and a silver in 2019. Her partner in the mixed C2 boat was Marcin Pochwała, who was also her coach at the time.

Góra represented Poland in the inaugural edition of the C1 event at the 2020 Summer Olympics in Tokyo, after Poland was reallocated the Oceania quota. She finished in 19th place after being eliminated in the heats.

== World Cup individual podiums ==
Season	Date	Venue	Position	Event
2018	30 June 2018	Kraków	3rd	Mixed C2
