= Václav Chaloupka =

Czech canoeist (born 1998)

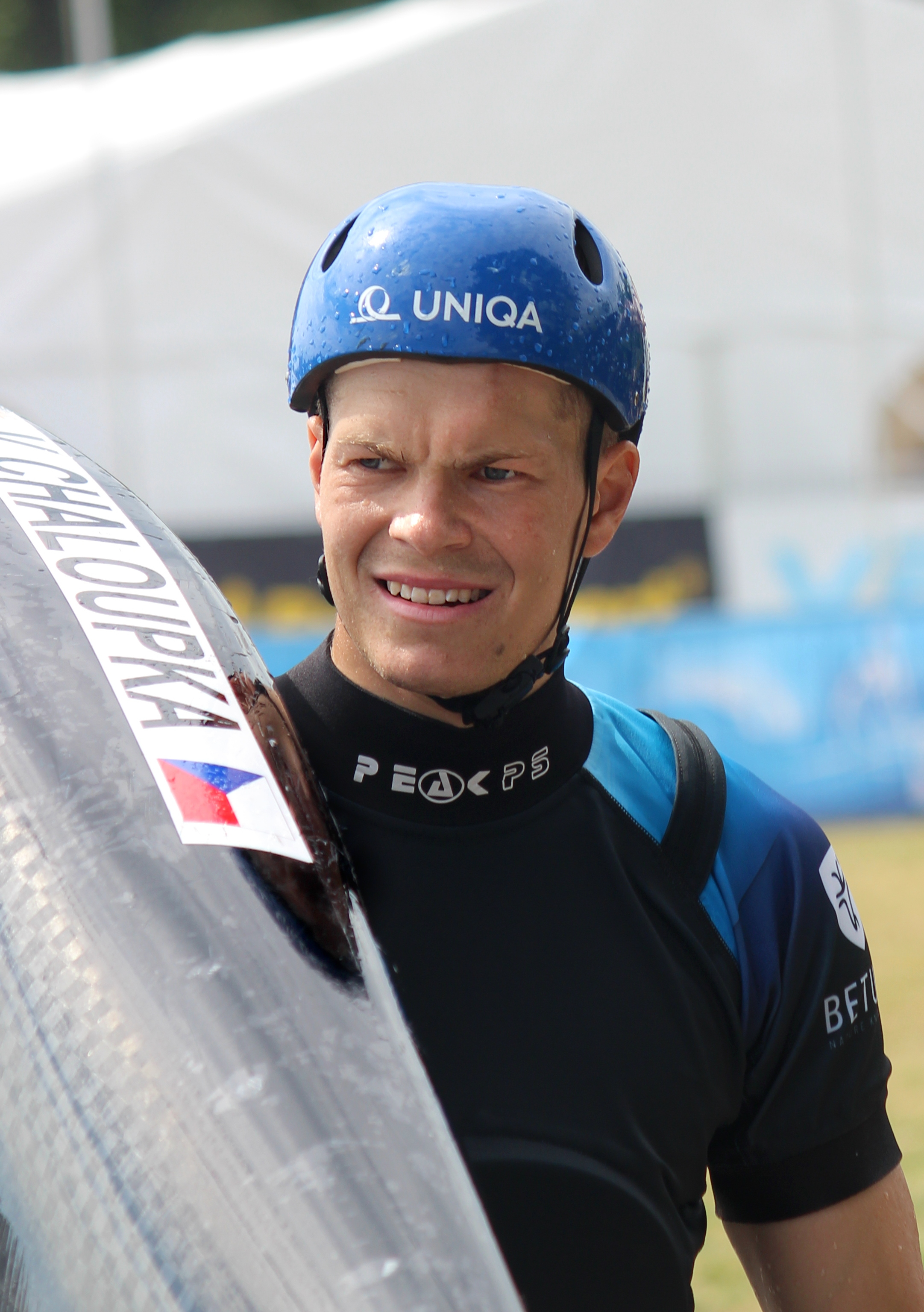
- Václav Chaloupka in 2023

Personal information
- Nationality: Czech
- Born: 18 February 1998 (age 28) Šternberk, Czech Republic

Sport
- Country: Czech Republic
- Sport: Canoe slalom
- Event: C1
- Club: Univerzitní sportovní klub Praha
- Coached by: Miloslav Říha
Medal record
Men's canoe slalom
Representing Czech Republic
World Championships
Gold medal – first place	2021 Bratislava	C1
Silver medal – second place	2021 Bratislava	C1 team
European Games
Bronze medal – third place	2023 Kraków	C1
European Championships
Silver medal – second place	2024 Tacen	C1 team
Silver medal – second place	2026 Ivrea	C1 team
Bronze medal – third place	2020 Prague	C1
U23 World Championships
Gold medal – first place	2017 Bratislava	C1 team
Gold medal – first place	2018 Ivrea	C1
Silver medal – second place	2017 Bratislava	C1
Silver medal – second place	2021 Tacen	C1 team
Bronze medal – third place	2019 Kraków	C1 team
Bronze medal – third place	2021 Tacen	C1
U23 European Championships
Gold medal – first place	2018 Bratislava	C1 team
Gold medal – first place	2021 Solkan	C1
Silver medal – second place	2019 Liptovský Mikuláš	C1 team
Silver medal – second place	2020 Kraków	C1 team
Silver medal – second place	2021 Solkan	C1 team
Bronze medal – third place	2017 Hohenlimburg	C1 team
Junior World Championships
Silver medal – second place	2014 Penrith	C1 team
Bronze medal – third place	2015 Foz do Iguaçu	C1
Bronze medal – third place	2015 Foz do Iguaçu	C1 team
Junior European Championships
Silver medal – second place	2014 Skopje	C1 team
Silver medal – second place	2016 Solkan	C1 team
Bronze medal – third place	2016 Solkan	C1

Václav Chaloupka (born 18 February 1998) is a Czech slalom canoeist. He has competed at the international level since 2014.

== BIography ==
Chaloupka is originally from Šternberk, Czech Republic and resides in Prague, home of the Prague-Troja Canoeing Centre.

He won two medals at the 2021 World Championships in Bratislava with a gold in C1 and a silver in the C1 team event. His individual title made him the first to become both World and U23 World Champion in the C1 event, as well as the first Czech to win the title since Petr Sodomka did so in Spittal in 1977.

He won 4 medals (2 silvers and 2 bronzes) at the European Championships. This includes a bronze medal in the C1 event at the 2020 European Championships on his home course in Prague and another bronze in the same event at the 2023 European Games in Kraków.

He won six medals at the U23 World Championships including a gold, silver and bronze medal in the C1 event at the 2018, 2017 and 2021 events, respectively.

Václav started paddling in 2008 with Sportovní Klub Univerzity Palackého in Olomouc after quitting football due to an injury. He is coached by Miloslav Říha.

== Results ==
=== World Cup individual podiums ===
Season	Date	Venue	Position	Event
2020	8 November 2020	Pau	2nd	C1
2026	30 May 2026	Tacen	2nd	C1
2026	4 September 2026	Vaires-sur-Marne	1st	C1

=== Complete World Cup results ===
Year	WC1	WC2	WC3	WC4	WC5	Points	Position
2017	Prague (Czech Republic); 12	Augsburg (Germany); 16	Markkleeberg (Germany); 32	Ivrea (Italy); 14	La Seu (Spain); 7	169	8th
2020	Tacen (Slovenia)	Pau (France); 2				N/A^{[a]}	
2021	Prague (Czech Republic); 28	Markkleeberg (Germany); 24	La Seu (Spain); 11	Pau (France); 5		146	11th

Notes
^{a} No overall rankings were determined by the ICF, with only two races possible due to the COVID-19 pandemic.

=== Complete Championship Results ===
Year	Level	Venue	Event	Result
2014	Junior European	(North Macedonia) Skopje	C1 team	2nd
2014	Junior European	(North Macedonia) Skopje	C1	16th
2014	Junior World	(Australia) Penrith	C1 team	2nd
2014	Junior World	(Australia) Penrith	C1	23rd
2015	Junior European	(Poland) Kraków	C1 team	4th
2015	Junior European	(Poland) Kraków	C1	4th
2015	Junior World	(Brazil) Foz do Iguaçu	C1 team	3rd
2015	Junior World	(Brazil) Foz do Iguaçu	C1	3rd
2016	Junior European	(Slovenia) Solkan	C1 team	2nd
2016	Junior European	(Slovenia) Solkan	C1	3rd
2016	Junior World	(Poland) Kraków	C1 team	8th
2016	Junior World	(Poland) Kraków	C1	10th
2017	U23 European	(Germany) Hohenlimburg	C1 team	3rd
2017	U23 European	(Germany) Hohenlimburg	C1	4th
2017	U23 World	(Slovakia) Bratislava	C1 team	1st
2017	U23 World	(Slovakia) Bratislava	C1	2nd
2018	U23 European	(Slovakia) Bratislava	C1 team	1st
2018	U23 European	(Slovakia) Bratislava	C1	12th
2018	U23 World	(Italy) Ivrea	C1 team	4th
2018	U23 World	(Italy) Ivrea	C1	1st
2019	U23 European	(Slovakia) Liptovský Mikuláš	C1 team	2nd
2019	U23 European	(Slovakia) Liptovský Mikuláš	C1	4th
2019	U23 World	(Poland) Kraków	C1 team	3rd
2019	U23 World	(Poland) Kraków	C1	20th
2020	U23 European	(Poland) Kraków	C1 team	2nd
2020	U23 European	(Poland) Kraków	C1	4th
2020	European	(Czech Republic) Prague	C1 team	4th
2020	European	(Czech Republic) Prague	C1	3rd
2021	U23 European	(Slovenia) Solkan	C1 team	2nd
2021	U23 European	(Slovenia) Solkan	C1	1st
2021	U23 World	(Slovenia) Tacen	C1 team	2nd
2021	U23 World	(Slovenia) Tacen	C1	3rd
2021	European	(Italy) Ivrea	C1 team	6th
2021	European	(Italy) Ivrea	C1	10th
2021	World	(Slovakia) Bratislava	C1 team	2nd
2021	World	(Slovakia) Bratislava	C1	1st
