= Noah Hegge =

German canoeist (born 1999)

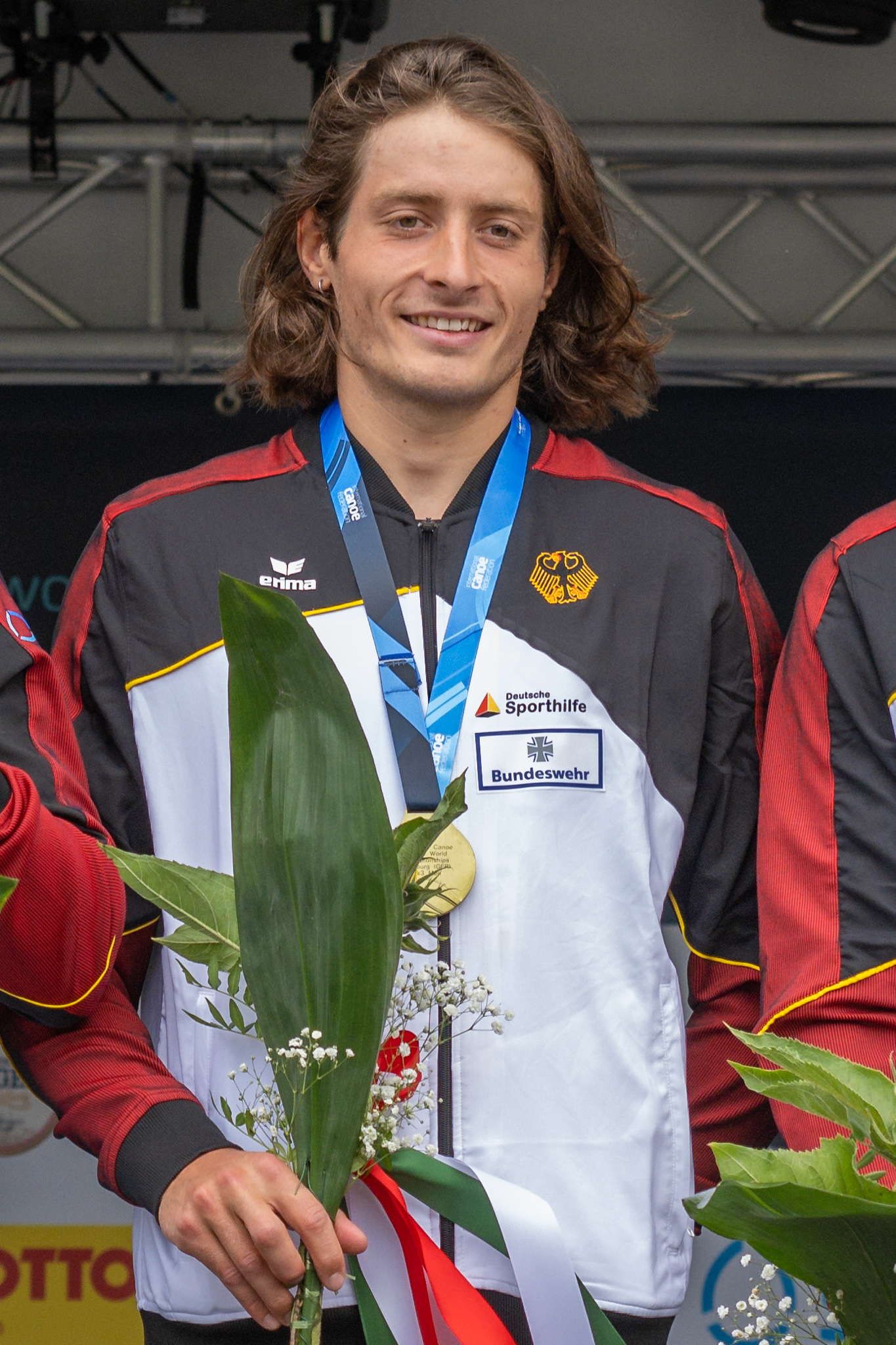
- Hegge in 2022

Personal information
- Nationality: German
- Born: 15 March 1999 (age 27)
- Home town: Augsburg, Germany

Sport
- Country: Germany
- Sport: Canoe slalom
- Rank: No. 42 (K1)
- Event: K1, Kayak cross
- Club: Kanu Schwaben Augsburg
Medal record
Men's canoe slalom
Representing Germany
Olympic Games
Bronze medal – third place	2024 Paris	Kayak cross
World Championships
Gold medal – first place	2022 Augsburg	K1 team
European Championships
Gold medal – first place	2025 Vaires-sur-Marne	K1 team
Bronze medal – third place	2022 Liptovský Mikuláš	K1 team
U23 World Championships
Bronze medal – third place	2021 Tacen	K1 team
U23 European Championships
Gold medal – first place	2020 Kraków	K1 team
Junior World Championships
Gold medal – first place	2017 Bratislava	K1 team
Silver medal – second place	2016 Kraków	K1 team
Junior European Championships
Gold medal – first place	2016 Solkan	K1 team
Bronze medal – third place	2017 Hohenlimburg	K1 team

Noah Hegge (born 15 March 1999) is a German slalom canoeist who has competed at the international level since 2016. Hegge competes in K1 and kayak cross.

He competed at the 2024 Summer Olympics in Paris where he won a bronze medal in kayak cross and finished 9th in the K1 event.

Hegge won a gold medal in the K1 team event at the 2022 ICF Canoe Slalom World Championships in Augsburg. He also won one gold and one bronze medal in the K1 team event at the European Championships.

He has won three medals in the K1 team event at the Junior and U23 World Championships, with a gold in 2017, a silver in 2016 (both junior), and a bronze in 2021 (U23). Hegge is also a two-time European Champion in K1 team, winning gold at both the 2020 U23 European Championships in Kraków and 2016 Junior European Championships in Solkan. He finished 11th in the overall World Cup standings in 2021. Hegge earned his best senior World Championship result of 6th at the 2021 event, where Germany fielded all three athletes in the final for the first time since 1995.

Hegge began paddling with Kanu Schwaben Augsburg in 2007, following his older brothers into the sport. In 2018 he finished his apprenticeship as a pastry chef, and was accepted into the Sportfördergruppe der Bundeswehr, allowing him to commit to his slalom career.

He lives and trains in Augsburg, home of the Eiskanal.

== Results ==
=== World Cup individual podiums ===
Season	Date	Venue	Position	Event
2025	13 June 2025	Pau	1st	K1
2025	5 September 2025	Augsburg	2nd	K1

=== Complete World Cup results ===
Year	Class	WC1	WC2	WC3	WC4	WC5	Points	Position
2019	K1	Lee Valley (United Kingdom)	Bratislava (Slovakia)	Tacen (Slovenia); 19	Markkleeberg (Germany)	Prague (Czech Republic)	26	59th
2021	K1	Prague (Czech Republic); 26	Markkleeberg (Germany)	La Seu (Spain); 10	Pau (France); 6		141	11th

=== Complete Championship results ===
Year	Level	Venue	Event	Result
2016	Junior World	(Poland) Kraków	K1 team	2nd
2016	Junior World	(Poland) Kraków	K1	17th
2016	Junior European	(Slovenia) Solkan	K1 team	1st
2016	Junior European	(Slovenia) Solkan	K1	9th
2017	Junior World	(Slovakia) Bratislava	K1 team	1st
2017	Junior World	(Slovakia) Bratislava	K1	23rd
2017	Junior European	(Germany) Hohenlimburg	K1 team	3rd
2017	Junior European	(Germany) Hohenlimburg	K1	26th
2020	U23 European	(Poland) Kraków	K1 team	1st
2020	U23 European	(Poland) Kraków	K1	5th
2021	U23 World	(Slovenia) Tacen	K1 team	3rd
2021	U23 World	(Slovenia) Tacen	K1	6th
2021	U23 World	(Slovenia) Tacen	Kayak cross	25th
2021	World	(Slovakia) Bratislava	K1 team	16th
2021	World	(Slovakia) Bratislava	K1	6th
2021	World	(Slovakia) Bratislava	Kayak cross	44th
