= Klara Olazabal =

Spanish canoeist

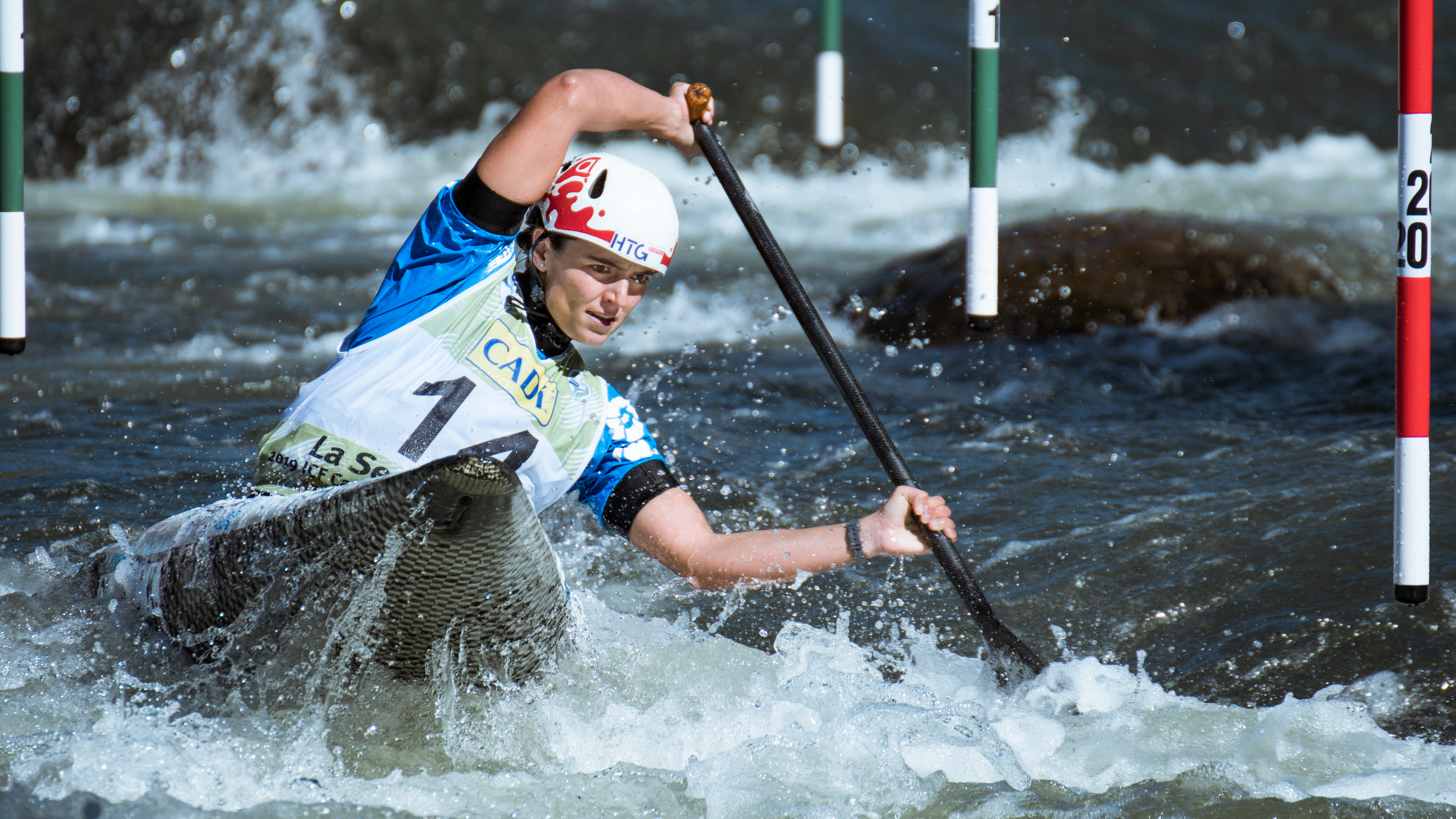

Personal information
- Nationality: Spanish
- Born: 28 August 1998 (age 27)

Sport
- Country: Spain
- Sport: Canoe slalom
- Event: C1, K1
Medal record
Women's canoe slalom
Representing Spain
World Championships
Silver medal – second place	2019 La Seu d'Urgell	C1 team
Silver medal – second place	2021 Bratislava	C1 team
European Championships
Gold medal – first place	2015 Markkleeberg	C1 team
Bronze medal – third place	2018 Prague	C1 team
U23 World Championships
Gold medal – first place	2015 Foz do Iguaçu	C1 team
Gold medal – first place	2018 Ivrea	C1 team
Silver medal – second place	2017 Bratislava	C1 team
U23 European Championships
Gold medal – first place	2018 Bratislava	C1 team
Silver medal – second place	2016 Solkan	C1 team
Silver medal – second place	2021 Solkan	C1 team
Junior World Championships
Silver medal – second place	2014 Penrith	K1 team
Junior European Championships
Gold medal – first place	2014 Skopje	C1 team
Bronze medal – third place	2014 Skopje	K1 team
Bronze medal – third place	2015 Kraków	K1 team

Klara Olazabal (born 28 August 1998) is a Spanish slalom canoeist who has competed at the international level since 2013.

She won two silver medals in the C1 team event at the ICF Canoe Slalom World Championships, earning them in 2019 and 2021.
