= Ainhoa Lameiro =

Spanish canoeist

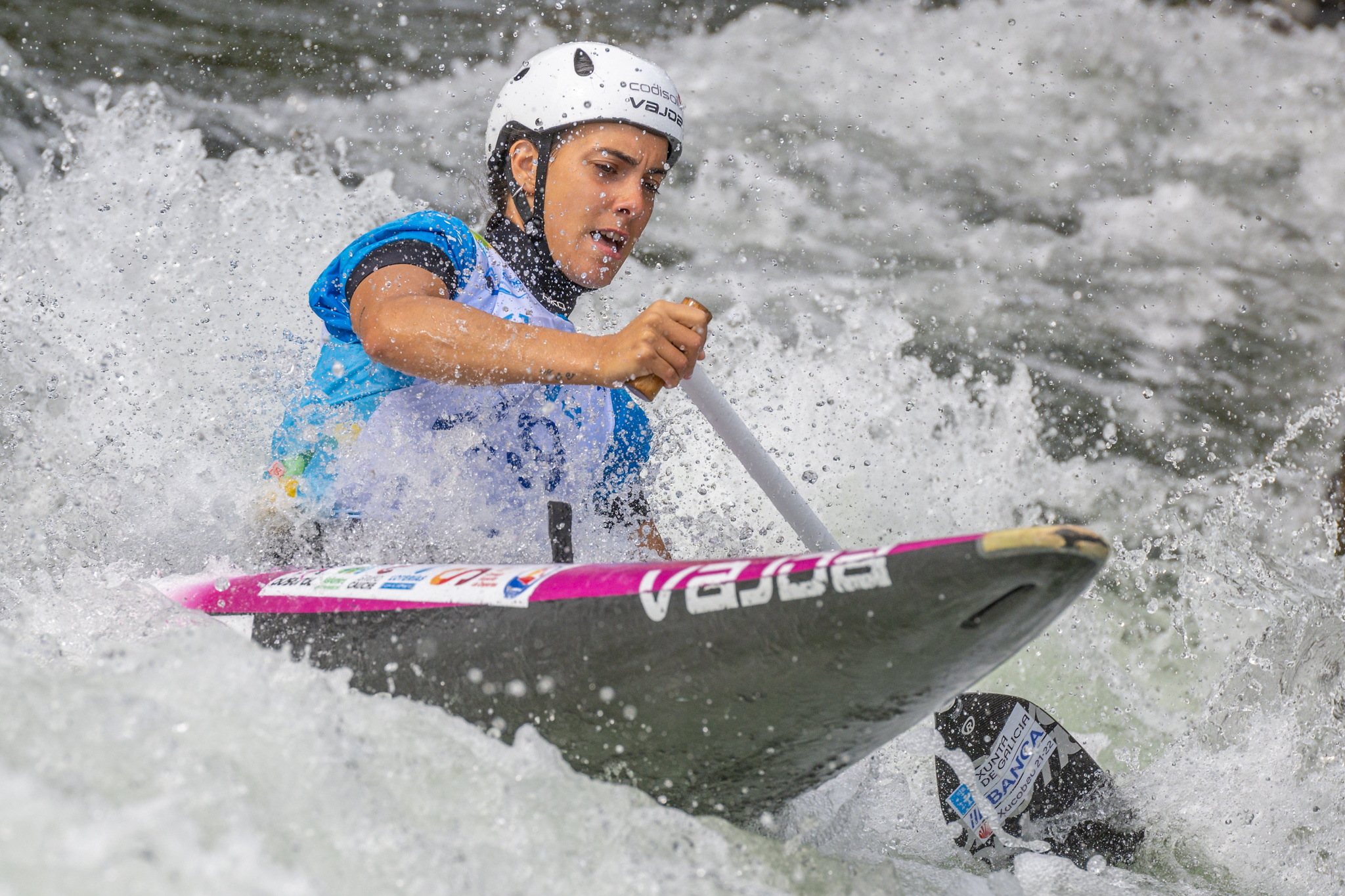
- Ainhoa Lameiro performing at 2022 ICF Canoe Slalom World Championships in Augsburg, Germany

Personal information
- Nationality: Spanish
- Born: 21 September 2000 (age 25)

Sport
- Country: Spain
- Sport: Canoe slalom
- Event: C1, K1, Mixed C2
Medal record
Women's canoe slalom
Representing Spain
World Championships
Silver medal – second place	2019 La Seu d'Urgell	C1 team
U23 European Championships
Silver medal – second place	2021 Solkan	C1 team
Junior World Championships
Bronze medal – third place	2018 Ivrea	Mixed C2

Ainhoa Lameiro (born 21 September 2000) is a Spanish slalom canoeist who has competed at the international level since 2016.

She won a silver medal in the C1 team event at the 2019 ICF Canoe Slalom World Championships in La Seu d'Urgell.
