= 2021 World Junior and U23 Canoe Slalom Championships =

The 2021 ICF World Junior and U23 Canoe Slalom Championships took place in Ljubljana, Slovenia, from 6 to 11 July 2021, under the auspices of the International Canoe Federation (ICF). It was the 22nd edition of the competition for Juniors (U18) and the 9th edition for the Under 23 category.

== Medal summary ==
=== Men ===
==== Canoe ====
===== Junior =====
Event	Gold		Silver		Bronze	
C1	Martino Barzon; Italy	91.92	Martin Kratochvíl; Czech Republic	92.19	Adam Král; Czech Republic	93.78
C1 team	Czech Republic; Adam Král; Martin Kratochvíl; Matyáš Říha	96.80	France; Mewen Debliquy; Quentin Maillefer; Tanguy Adisson	105.33	Germany; Benjamin Kies; Konrad Ginzel; Franz Gosse	106.21

===== U23 =====
Event	Gold		Silver		Bronze	
C1	Nicolas Gestin; France	86.27	Jules Bernardet; France	87.39	Václav Chaloupka; Czech Republic	88.83
C1 team	Slovenia; Nejc Polenčič; Juš Javornik; Urh Turnšek	93.80	Czech Republic; Václav Chaloupka; Vojtěch Heger; Matyáš Lhota	94.64	France; Nicolas Gestin; Jules Bernardet; Alexis Bobon	94.72

==== Kayak ====
===== Junior =====
Event	Gold		Silver		Bronze	
K1	Titouan Castryck; France	85.01	Martin Rudorfer; Czech Republic	85.82	Jan Ločnikar; Slovenia	88.85
K1 team	Slovenia; Jan Ločnikar; Urban Gajšek; Jakob Šavli	95.97	Czech Republic; Martin Rudorfer; Matyáš Novák; Jakub Mrázek	96.95	France; Oskar Hillion; Titouan Castryck; Edouard Chenal	97.69
Extreme Canoe Slalom	Kaelin Friedenson; United States		Martin Rudorfer; Czech Republic		George Snook; New Zealand	

===== U23 =====
Event	Gold		Silver		Bronze	
K1	Jakub Krejčí; Czech Republic	81.89	Jonny Dickson; Great Britain	84.25	Christopher Bowers; Great Britain	84.55
K1 team	Czech Republic; Jakub Krejčí; Jan Bárta; Tomáš Zima	88.09	France; Anatole Delassus; Malo Quéméneur; Simon Hene	92.41	Germany; Noah Hegge; Tim Bremer; Thomas Strauss	92.57
Extreme Canoe Slalom	Dimitri Marx; Switzerland		Jan Rohrer; Switzerland		Jakub Brzeziński; Poland	

=== Women ===
==== Canoe ====
===== Junior =====
Event	Gold		Silver		Bronze	
C1	Klára Kneblová; Czech Republic	101.59	Tereza Kneblová; Czech Republic	102.18	Evy Leibfarth; United States	107.10
C1 team	Czech Republic; Tereza Kneblová; Klára Kneblová; Lucie Doležalová	110.61	Germany; Paulina Pirro; Lucie Krech; Zola Lewandowski	129.06	Slovakia; Zuzana Paňková; Ivana Chlebová; Ema Diešková	138.76

===== U23 =====
Event	Gold		Silver		Bronze	
C1	Bethan Forrow; Great Britain	100.62	Emanuela Luknárová; Slovakia	101.43	Elena Apel; Germany	101.60
C1 team	Czech Republic; Martina Satková; Gabriela Satková; Eva Říhová	112.33	France; Angèle Hug; Doriane Delassus; Fanchon Janssen	114.23	Slovakia; Simona Glejteková; Soňa Stanovská; Emanuela Luknárová	118.78

==== Kayak ====
===== Junior =====
Event	Gold		Silver		Bronze	
K1	Evy Leibfarth; United States	93.52	Emma Vuitton; France	98.23	Zuzana Paňková; Slovakia	98.97
K1 team	Germany; Hannah Süss; Paulina Pirro; Lucie Krech	108.08	Czech Republic; Klára Kneblová; Tereza Kneblová; Amélie Červenková	116.05	Slovenia; Helena Domajnko; Sara Belingar; Ula Skok	119.19
Extreme Canoe Slalom	Jessica Duc; Switzerland		Marina Novysh; Russia		Tereza Kneblová; Czech Republic	

===== U23 =====
Event	Gold		Silver		Bronze	
K1	Coline Charel; France	99.10	Romane Prigent; France	99.24	Ria Sribar; United States	99.42
K1 team	France; Angèle Hug; Romane Prigent; Coline Charel	101.09	Slovakia; Soňa Stanovská; Michaela Haššová; Kristína Ďurecová	104.24	Germany; Elena Apel; Franziska Hanke; Nele Gosse	106.39
Extreme Canoe Slalom	Nikita Setchell; Great Britain		Martina Satková; Czech Republic		Antonie Galušková; Czech Republic	

=== Mixed ===
==== Canoe ====
===== Junior =====
Only three boats from two countries entered the mixed C2 junior event, which meant that no medals were awarded. A minimum of 6 countries is required for an event to count as a world championship.

Event	First		Second		Third	
C2 (non-medal event)	Marina Novysh; Dmitrii Shestakov; Russia	110.61	Wojciech Fabijański; Alicja Bulera; Poland	118.16	Valentina Vybornova; Sergei Smirnov; Russia	123.28

== Medal table ==
* Host nation (Slovenia)

Rank	Nation	Gold	Silver	Bronze	Total
1	Czech Republic (CZE)	6	8	4	18
2	France (FRA)	4	6	2	12
3	Great Britain (GBR)	2	1	1	4
4	Switzerland (SUI)	2	1	0	3
5	Slovenia (SLO)*	2	0	2	4
5	United States (USA)	2	0	2	4
7	Germany (GER)	1	1	4	6
8	Italy (ITA)	1	0	0	1
9	Slovakia (SVK)	0	2	3	5
10	Russia (RUS)	0	1	0	1
11	New Zealand (NZL)	0	0	1	1
11	Poland (POL)	0	0	1	1
Totals (12 entries)		20	20	20	60
