= Malo Quéméneur =

French slalom canoeist

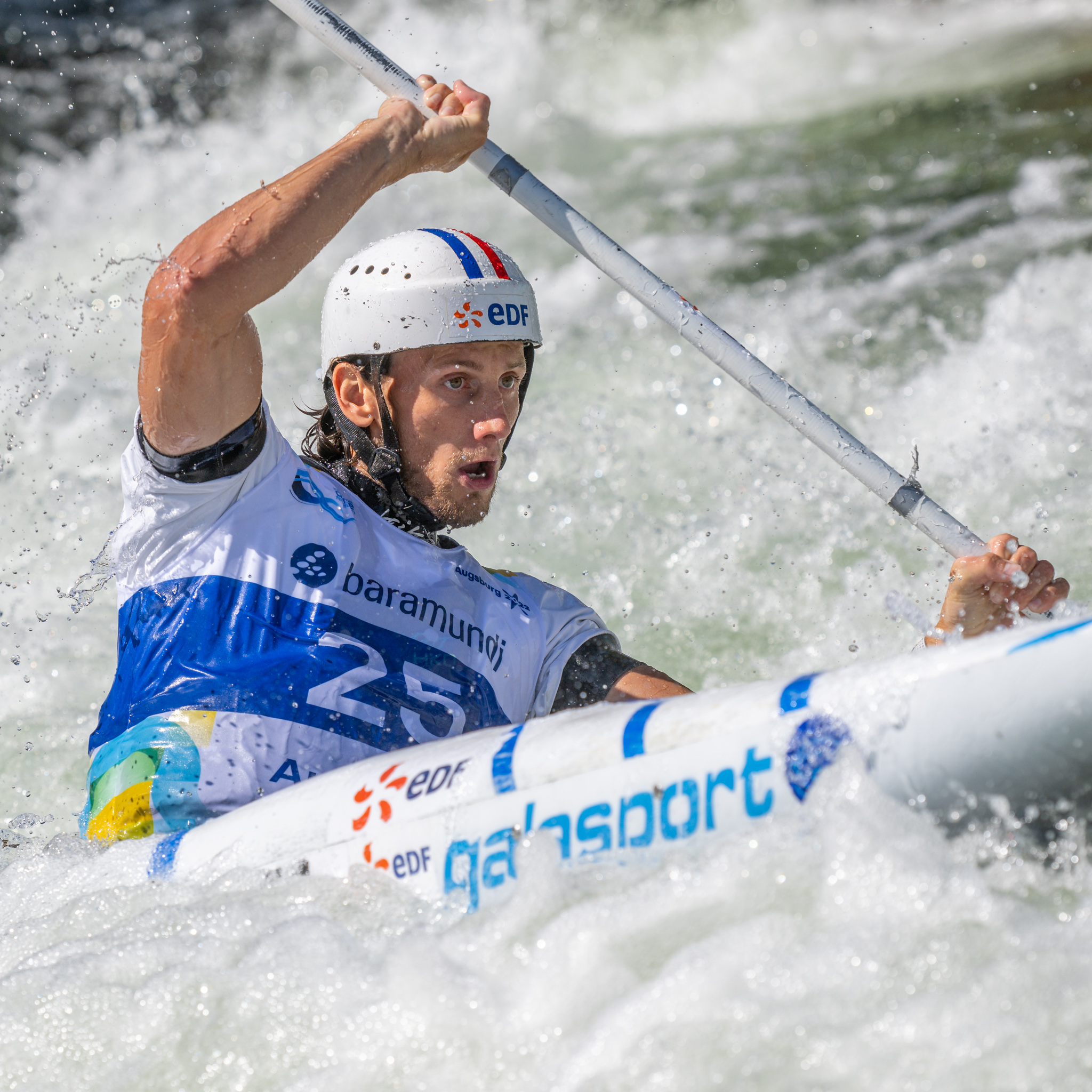
- Malo Quéméneur performing at 2022 ICF Canoe Slalom World Championships in Augsburg, Germany

Personal information
- Nationality: French
- Born: 1998 (age 27–28)

Sport
- Country: France
- Sport: Canoe slalom
- Event: K1
Medal record
Men's canoe slalom
Representing France
World Championships
Bronze medal – third place	2022 Augsburg	K1 team
U23 World Championships
Gold medal – first place	2018 Ivrea	K1 team
Gold medal – first place	2019 Kraków	K1 team
Silver medal – second place	2018 Ivrea	Extreme K1
Silver medal – second place	2021 Tacen	K1 team
U23 European Championships
Gold medal – first place	2019 Liptovský Mikuláš	K1 team
Gold medal – first place	2021 Solkan	K1 team
Junior World Championships
Gold medal – first place	2015 Foz do Iguaçu	K1 team
Gold medal – first place	2016 Kraków	K1 team
Silver medal – second place	2015 Foz do Iguaçu	K1

Malo Quéméneur (born 1998) is a French slalom canoeist who has competed at the international level since 2015.

He won a bronze medal in the K1 team event at the 2022 World Championships in Augsburg.
