= Romane Prigent =

French kayaker (born 1999)

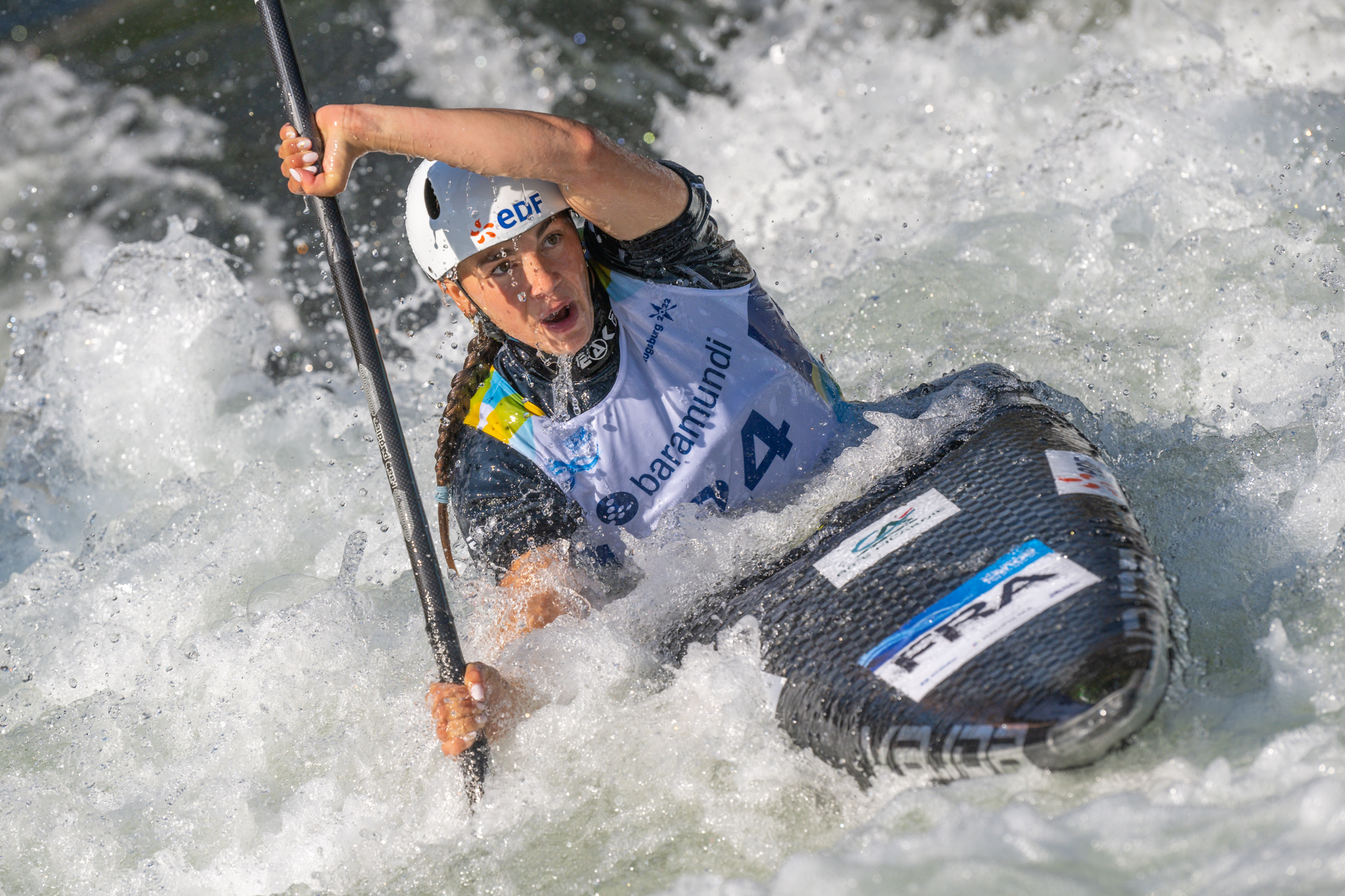

Personal information
- Nickname: Rory
- Nationality: French
- Born: 1 April 1999 (age 27)
- Home town: Pau, France
- Height: 162 cm (5 ft 4 in)
- Weight: 53 kg (117 lb)

Sport
- Country: France
- Sport: Canoe slalom
- Rank: No. 53 (K1)
- Event: K1
- Club: Pau Canoe-kayak Club Universitaire
- Coached by: Jonas Turmeau, Jérôme Blanchet
Medal record
Women's canoe slalom
Representing France
European Championships
Gold medal – first place	2022 Liptovský Mikuláš	K1 team
U23 World Championships
Gold medal – first place	2019 Kraków	K1 team
Gold medal – first place	2021 Tacen	K1 team
Silver medal – second place	2021 Tacen	K1
Bronze medal – third place	2022 Ivrea	K1 team
U23 European Championships
Gold medal – first place	2018 Bratislava	K1 team
Silver medal – second place	2022 České Budějovice	K1 team
Junior World Championships
Silver medal – second place	2016 Kraków	K1 team
Silver medal – second place	2017 Bratislava	K1 team
Junior European Championships
Silver medal – second place	2017 Hohenlimburg	K1 team
Bronze medal – third place	2017 Hohenlimburg	K1

Romane Prigent (born 1 April 1999) is a French slalom canoeist who has competed at the international level since 2016. She is from Pau in the Pyrénées-Atlantiques department of France and competes for Pau Canoe-kayak Club Universitaire.

She won a gold medal in the K1 team event at the 2022 European Canoe Slalom Championships in Liptovský Mikuláš. She has also won six medals at the Junior and U23 World Championships, with 2 U23 titles in K1 team (2019, 2021), an U23 silver in K1 (2021), 2 junior silver medals in K1 team (2016, 2017) and an U23 bronze in K1 team (2022). Prigent won the first World Cup round in 2020 in Tacen, after training alone due to the COVID-19 pandemic, an achievement which provided her with self-belief.

Outside of slalom she has attained a Baccalauréat scientifique and a STAPS licence (sports science). Her cousin Camille Prigent is also a professional slalom canoeist, and Romane's training partner. Her uncle Jean-Yves and cousin Yves are former slalom canoeists, and World Champions in K1 team and Mixed C2, respectively.

== Results ==
=== World Cup individual podiums ===
Season	Date	Venue	Position	Event
2020	17 October 2020	Tacen	1st	K1
2020	7 November 2020	Pau	2nd	K1

=== Complete World Cup results ===
Year	WC1	WC2	WC3	WC4	WC5	Points	Position
2019	Lee Valley (United Kingdom)	Bratislava (Slovakia)	Tacen (Slovenia); 19	Markkleeberg (Germany)	Prague (Czech Republic)	24	47th
2020	Tacen (Slovenia); 1	Pau (France); 2				N/A^{[a]}	
2021	Prague (Czech Republic); 15	Markkleeberg (Germany); 13	La Seu (Spain); 9	Pau (France); 16		148	13th

Notes
^{a} No overall rankings were determined by the ICF, with only two races possible due to the COVID-19 pandemic.
