= Christopher Bowers (canoeist) =

British slalom canoeist

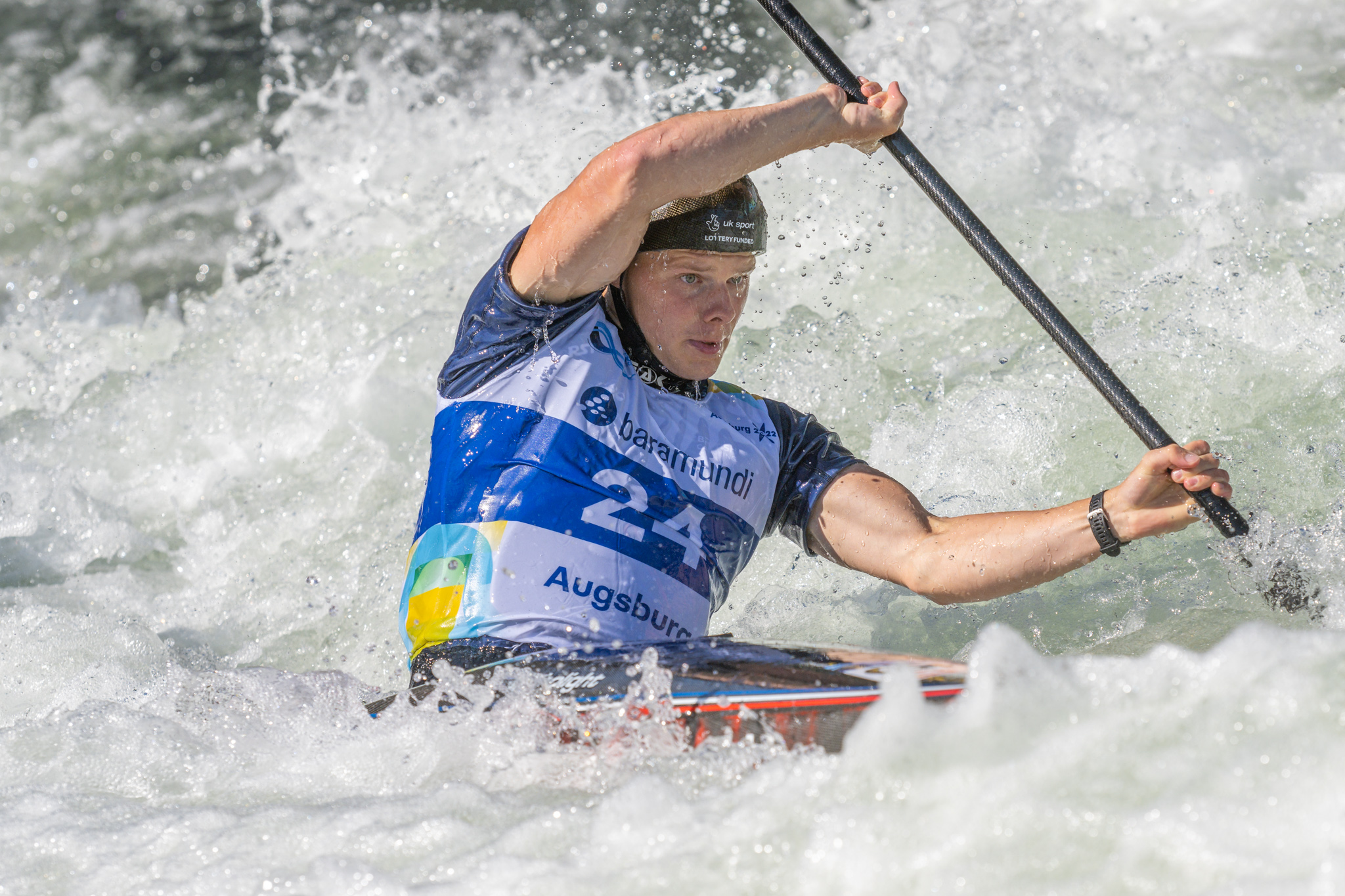
- Christopher Bowers performing at 2022 ICF Canoe Slalom World Championships in Augsburg, Germany

Personal information
- Nationality: British
- Born: 30 July 1998 (age 27) Stoke-on-Trent, England
- Height: 1.80 m (5 ft 11 in)

Sport
- Country: Great Britain
- Sport: Canoe slalom
- Event: K1, Kayak cross
- Club: Stafford and Stone Canoe Club
Medal record
Men's canoe slalom
Representing Great Britain
World Championships
Gold medal – first place	2018 Rio de Janeiro	K1 team
Silver medal – second place	2022 Augsburg	K1 team
European Championships
Bronze medal – third place	2021 Ivrea	K1 team
U23 World Championships
Bronze medal – third place	2021 Tacen	K1
U23 European Championships
Bronze medal – third place	2021 Solkan	K1
Junior World Championships
Bronze medal – third place	2014 Penrith	K1 team
Junior European Championships
Bronze medal – third place	2015 Kraków	K1 team

Christopher Bowers (born 30 July 1998) is a British slalom canoeist who has competed at the international level since 2014.

He won two medals in the K1 team event at the ICF Canoe Slalom World Championships with a gold in 2018 and a silver in 2022. He also won a bronze medal in the K1 team event at the 2021 European Championships in Ivrea.

== World Cup individual podiums ==
Season	Date	Venue	Position	Event
2022	19 June 2022	Kraków	1st	Kayak cross
