= Bradley Forbes-Cryans =

British slalom canoeist

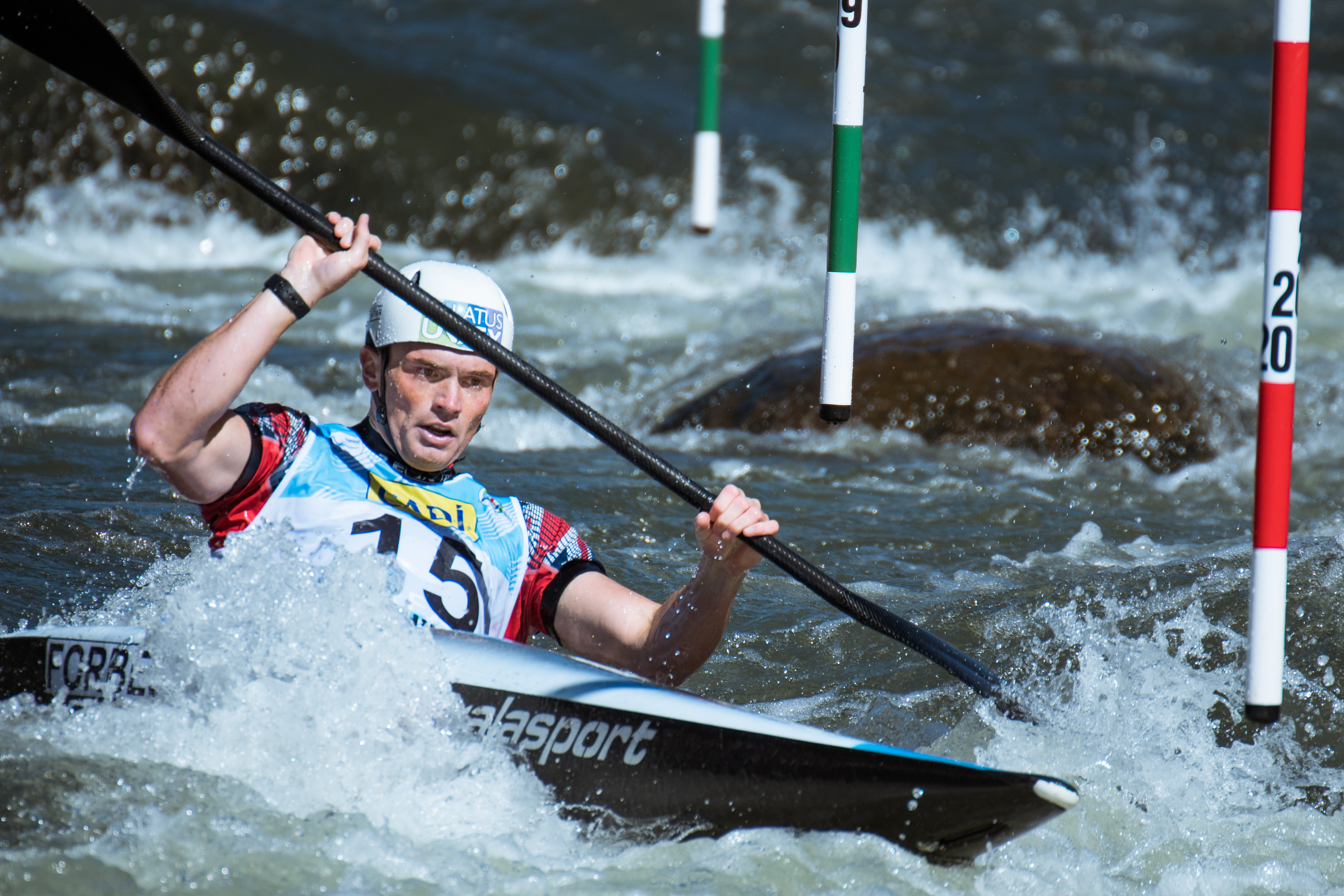
- Forbes-Cryans at the 2016 European Championships

Personal information
- Born: 25 March 1995 (age 31) Edinburgh, Scotland
- Education: Edinburgh Academy
- Height: 179 cm (5 ft 10 in)
- Weight: 75 kg (165 lb)

Sport
- Country: Great Britain
- Sport: Canoe slalom
- Event: K1
- Club: CR Cats
- Coached by: Richard Hounslow
Medal record
Men's canoe slalom
Representing Great Britain
World Championships
| Gold medal – first place | 2018 Rio de Janeiro | K1 team |
| Silver medal – second place | 2022 Augsburg | K1 team |
| Bronze medal – third place | 2015 London | K1 team |
European Championships
| Silver medal – second place | 2015 Markkleeberg | K1 team |
| Bronze medal – third place | 2021 Ivrea | K1 team |
U23 World Championships
| Silver medal – second place | 2018 Ivrea | K1 |

Bradley Forbes-Cryans (born 25 March 1995) is a retired British slalom canoeist who competed at the international level from 2012 to 2022.

He won three medals in the K1 team event at the ICF Canoe Slalom World Championships with a gold in 2018, a silver in 2022 and a bronze in 2015. He also won a silver and a bronze medal in the K1 team event at the European Championships. He earned his best senior world championship result, of 4th, at the 2019 ICF Canoe Slalom World Championships in La Seu d'Urgell.

Bradley represented Great Britain in the K1 event at the delayed 2020 Summer Olympics in Tokyo, finishing in 6th place.

He announced his retirement from international competition before the start of the 2023 season.

== World Cup individual podiums ==
| Season | Date | Venue | Position | Event |
|---|---|---|---|---|
| 2016 | 10 September 2016 | Tacen | 2nd | K1 |
