= Joan Crespo =

Spanish slalom canoeist

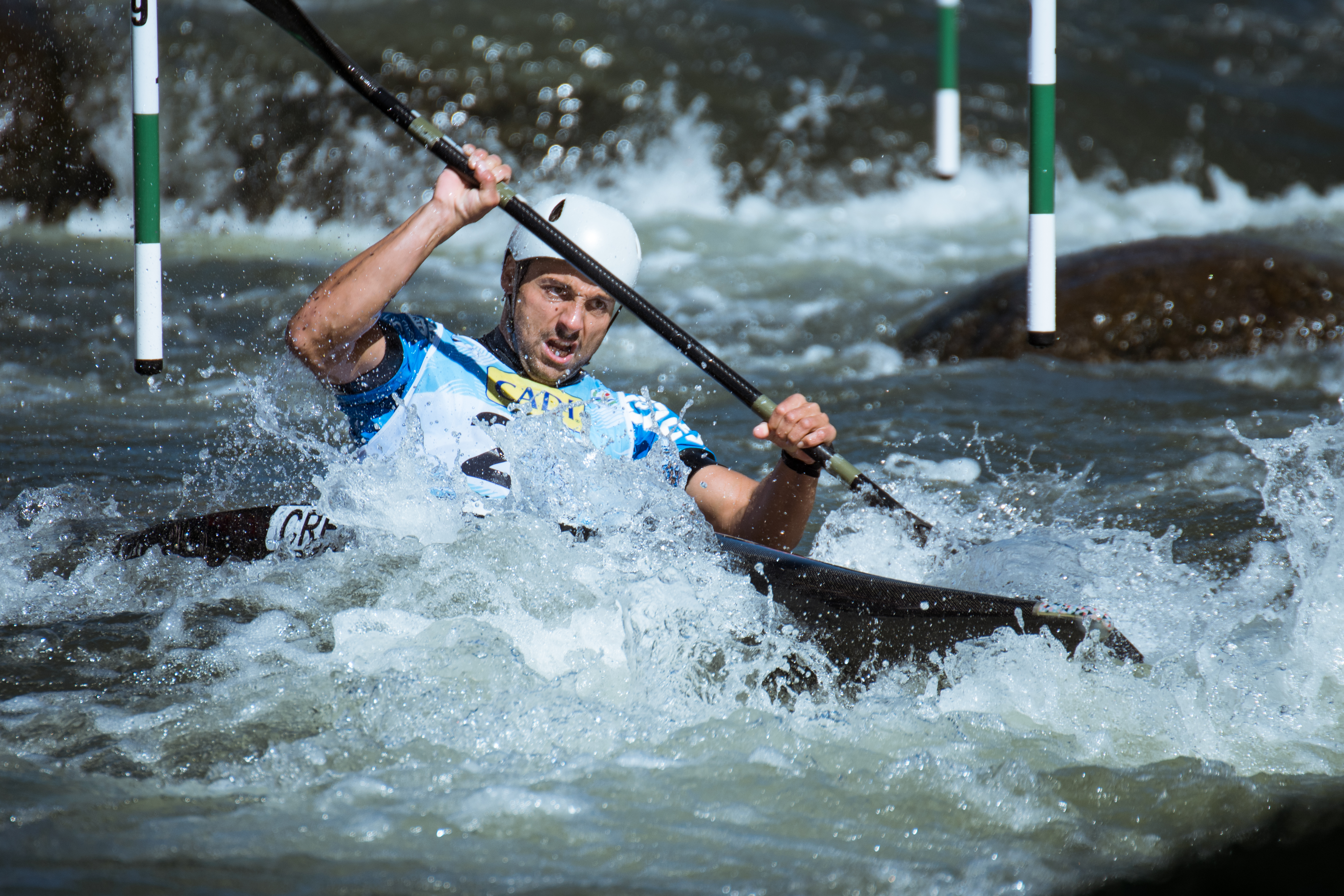

Personal information
- Nationality: Spanish
- Born: 29 January 1988 (age 38) San Sebastián, Spain
- Height: 1.80 m (5 ft 11 in)
- Weight: 75 kg (165 lb)

Sport
- Country: Spain
- Sport: Canoe slalom
- Event: K1, Kayak cross
- Club: SD Santiagotarrak
Medal record
Men's canoe slalom
Representing Spain
World Championships
| Gold medal – first place | 2019 La Seu d'Urgell | K1 team |
| Bronze medal – third place | 2009 La Seu d'Urgell | K1 team |
| Bronze medal – third place | 2019 La Seu d'Urgell | K1 |
| Bronze medal – third place | 2021 Bratislava | K1 |
European Championships
| Bronze medal – third place | 2016 Liptovský Mikuláš | K1 team |

Joan Crespo Sistiaga (born 29 January 1988) is a Spanish slalom canoeist who has competed at the international level since 2004.

He won four medals at the ICF Canoe Slalom World Championships with a gold (K1 team: 2019) and three bronzes (K1: 2019, 2021, K1 team: 2009). He also won a bronze medal in the K1 team event at the 2016 European Championships in Liptovský Mikuláš.

== World Cup individual podiums ==
| Season | Date | Venue | Position | Event |
|---|---|---|---|---|
| 2021 | 12 September 2021 | Pau | 1st | Kayak cross |
