= Martin Srabotnik =

Slovenian slalom canoeist

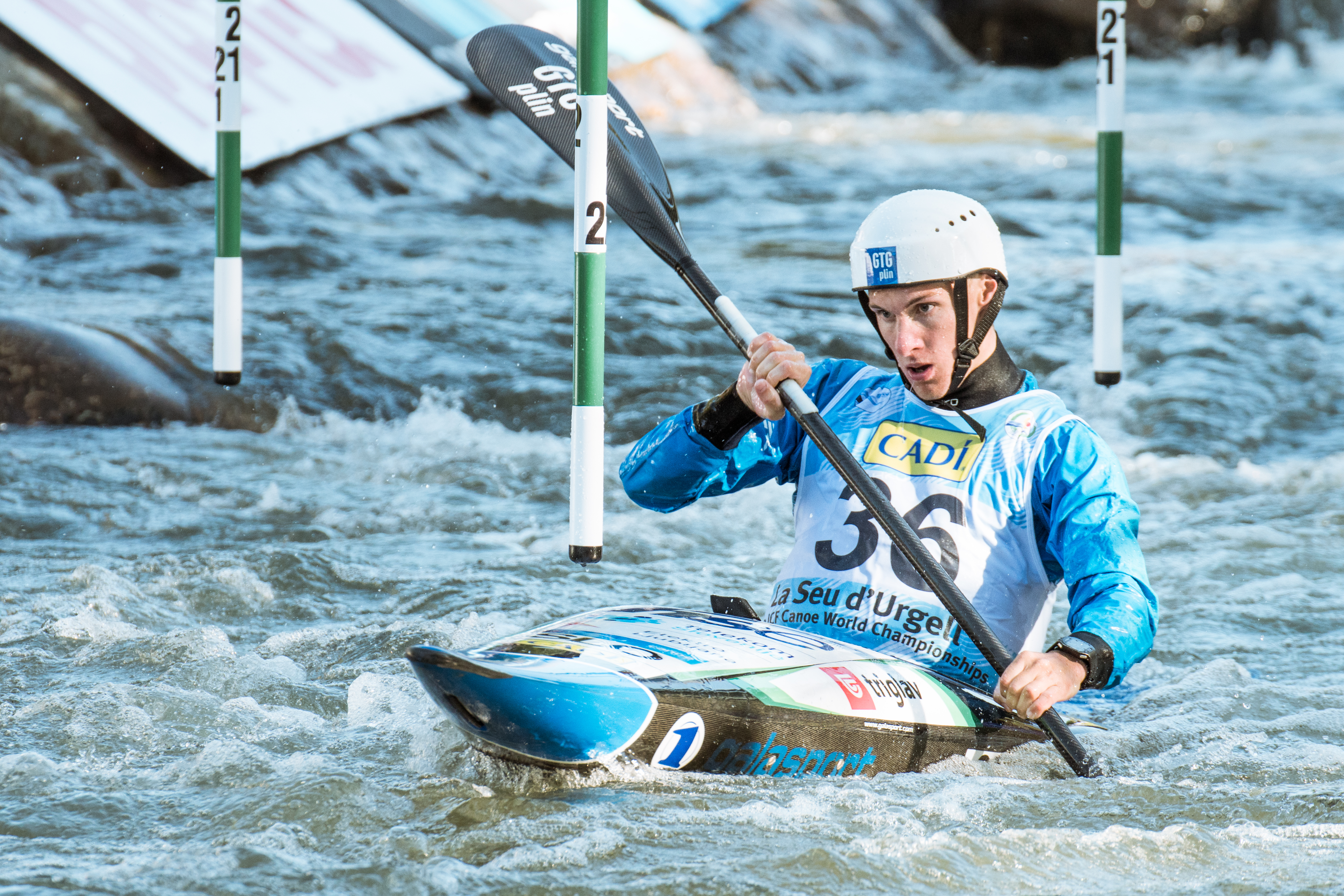

Personal information
- Nationality: Slovenian
- Born: 19 December 1995 (age 30)

Sport
- Country: Slovenia
- Sport: Canoe slalom
- Event: K1
- Club: KKK Nivo Celje
Medal record
Men's canoe slalom
Representing Slovenia
World Championships
Bronze medal – third place	2017 Pau	K1 team
Bronze medal – third place	2021 Bratislava	K1 team
European Championships
Silver medal – second place	2019 Pau	K1 team
Bronze medal – third place	2018 Prague	K1 team
Bronze medal – third place	2025 Vaires-sur-Marne	K1
U23 World Championships
Silver medal – second place	2017 Bratislava	K1 team
U23 European Championships
Gold medal – first place	2016 Solkan	K1 team
Gold medal – first place	2018 Bratislava	K1 team
Silver medal – second place	2017 Hohenlimburg	K1 team
Junior World Championships
Gold medal – first place	2012 Wausau	K1 team
Bronze medal – third place	2013 Liptovský Mikuláš	K1 team
Junior European Championships
Gold medal – first place	2011 Banja Luka	K1 team

Martin Srabotnik (born 19 December 1995) is a Slovenian slalom canoeist who has competed at the international level since 2011.

He won two bronze medals in the K1 team event at the ICF Canoe Slalom World Championships earning them in 2017 and 2021. He also three medals (one silver and two bronzes) at the European Championships.

== World Cup individual podiums ==
Season	Date	Venue	Position	Event
2022	25 June 2022	Tacen	2nd	K1
2022	3 September 2022	La Seu d'Urgell	2nd	K1
