= Ondřej Tunka =

Czech slalom canoeist (born 1990)

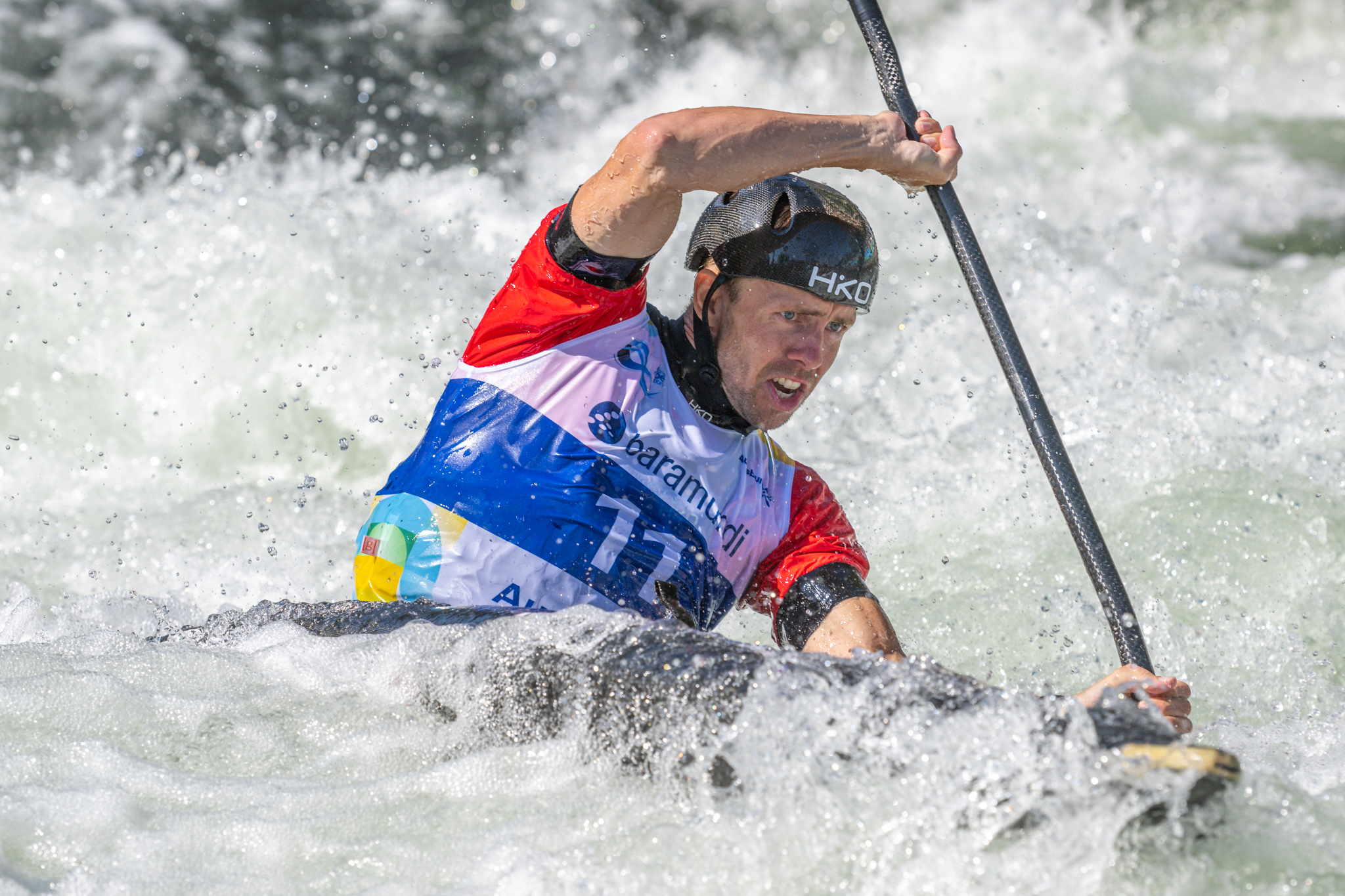
- Ondřej Tunka performing at 2022 ICF Canoe Slalom World Championships in Augsburg, Germany

Personal information
- Nationality: Czech
- Born: 29 September 1990 (age 35) Jablonec nad Nisou, Czech Republic
- Height: 1.77 m (5 ft 10 in)
- Weight: 70 kg (154 lb)

Sport
- Country: Czech Republic
- Sport: Canoe slalom
- Event: K1, Kayak cross
- Club: USK Praha
Medal record
Men's canoe slalom
Representing the Czech Republic
World Championships
Gold medal – first place	2015 London	K1 team
Gold medal – first place	2017 Pau	K1
Gold medal – first place	2017 Pau	K1 team
Bronze medal – third place	2018 Rio de Janeiro	K1 team
European Games
Gold medal – first place	2023 Kraków	Kayak cross
European Championships
Gold medal – first place	2017 Tacen	K1 team
Gold medal – first place	2018 Prague	K1 team
Gold medal – first place	2022 Liptovský Mikuláš	K1 team
U23 World Championships
Bronze medal – third place	2012 Wausau	K1 team
U23 European Championships
Gold medal – first place	2011 Banja Luka	K1 team
Gold medal – first place	2013 Bourg-Saint-Maurice	K1 team
Silver medal – second place	2012 Solkan	K1 team
Junior European Championships
Silver medal – second place	2008 Solkan	K1 team
Bronze medal – third place	2008 Solkan	K1

Ondřej Tunka (born 29 September 1990) is a Czech slalom canoeist who has competed at the international level since 2008.

He won four medals at the ICF Canoe Slalom World Championships with three golds (K1: 2017, K1 team: 2015, 2017) and a bronze (K1 team: 2018). He also won four gold medals at the European Championships, including a gold medal in kayak cross at the 2023 European Games in Kraków.

== World Cup individual podiums ==
Season	Date	Venue	Position	Event
2015	20 June 2015	Prague	3rd	K1
2016	3 September 2016	Prague	2nd	K1
2021	13 June 2021	Prague	3rd	Kayak cross
