= Kraków-Kolna Canoe Slalom Course =

Artificial whitewater course in Krakow, Poland

Coordinates: 50.032°N 19.825°E

- Tor kajakarstwa górskiego w Krakowie

About
- Locale: Kolna, Kraków, Poland
- Managing agent: Krakowski Klub Kajakowy
- Main shape: Linear
- Adjustable: yes
- Water source: Vistula River
- Pumped: No
- Flow diversion: Yes
- Practice pool: Yes
- Grandstands: Two sets of bleachers
- Canoe lift: No
- Facilities: Yes
- Construction: 2003, 2013

Stats
- Length: Total: 320 metres (1,050 ft) Competition: 250 metres (820 ft)
- Width: 12 metres (39 ft)
- Drop: 5 metres (16 ft)
- Slope: 2.0% (105 ft/mi)
- Flowrate: 15 m^{3}/s (530 cu ft/s)

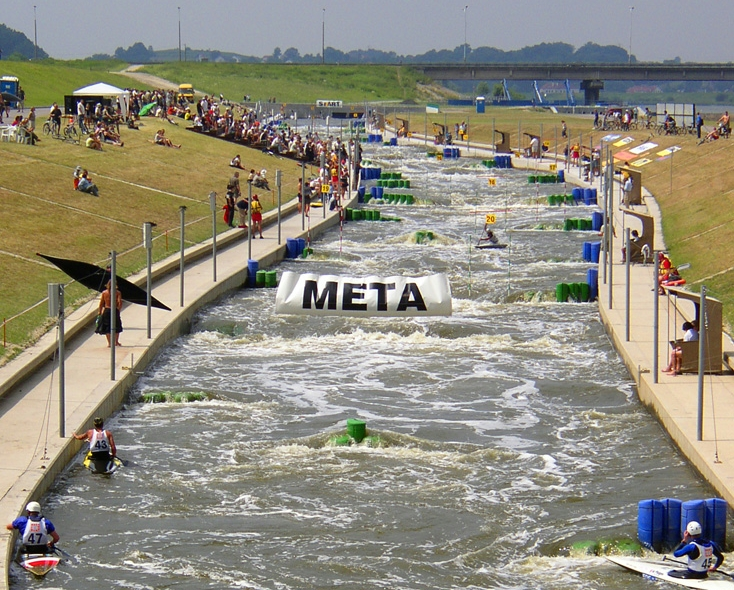

The Kraków-Kolna Canoe Slalom Course is an artificial whitewater course in Poland, on the south bank of the Vistula River, in the suburb of Kolna, 10 kilometres (6 mi) west of Kraków. It is fed with river water diverted around a nearby dam. The top 120 metres (394 ft) of the course is a flatwater start pool that is covered in winter by a long white tent. Air inside the tent is heated, but the water is cold.

This Olympic-standard slalom course is the site of frequent international competitions. In June 2013, it hosted the European Championships. It is part of a larger complex called the Kolna Sports and Recreation Center (Ośrodek Sportu i Rekreacji „Kolna"), which includes a canal for flatwater sprint canoeing and an indoor gymnasium and swimming pool.

== Design ==
The concrete channel has a flat bottom and vertical sides. The flow diverters are two pairs of concrete wing dams and clusters of vertical blue and green plastic bollards attached to peg boards on the channel bottom. A footbridge across the channel joins the first pair of wing dams.

To modernize the course for the 2013 European Championships, the top section was made shorter and steeper by extending the length of the start pool. This change entailed raising the channel walls 70 centimetres (28 in) in the section above the footbridge. Work was completed in April 2013.

Kraków-Kolna Canoe Slalom Course map

Gate map for 2013 European Championship Finals, 9 June 2013. All gates were single-pole.

== Gallery ==
European Canoe Slalom Championships, June 2013

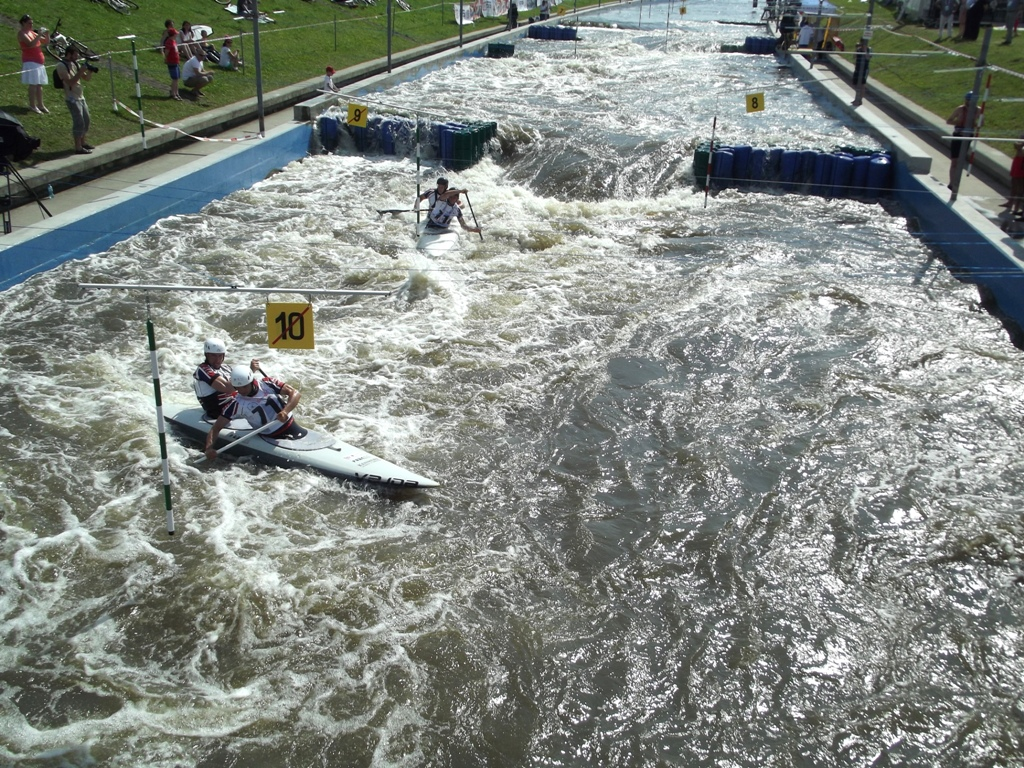
From the footbridge, the top 10 gates. British C-2 team.

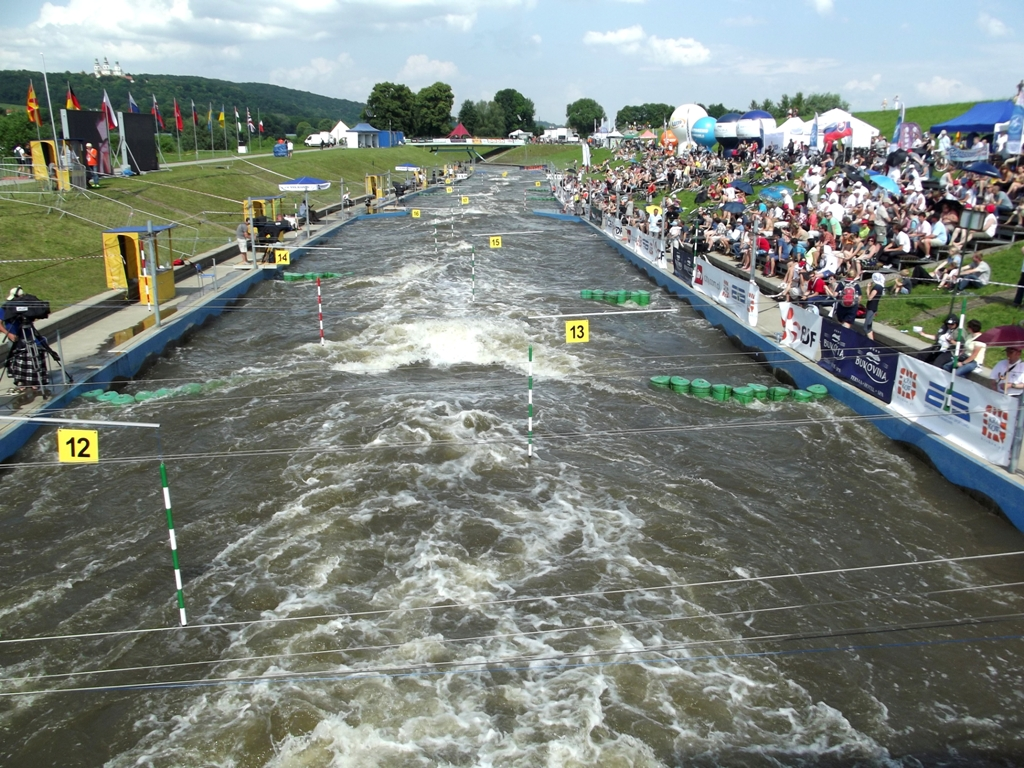
From the footbridge, the lower gates

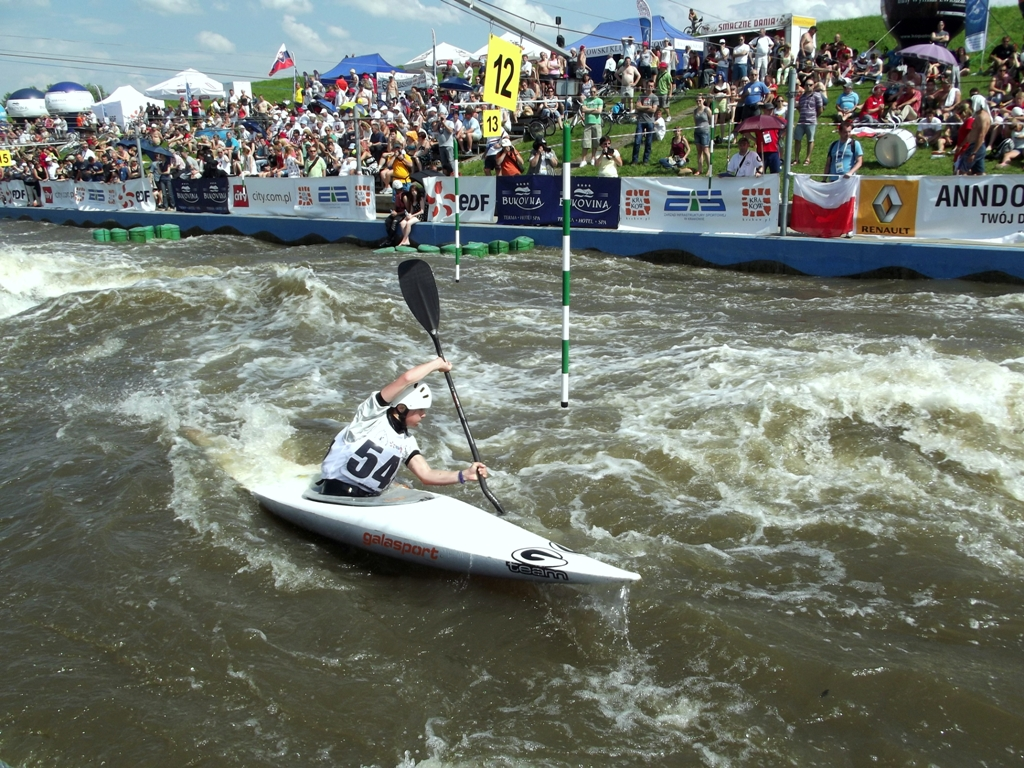
The K-1W team final. The first Spanish boat at gate #12.

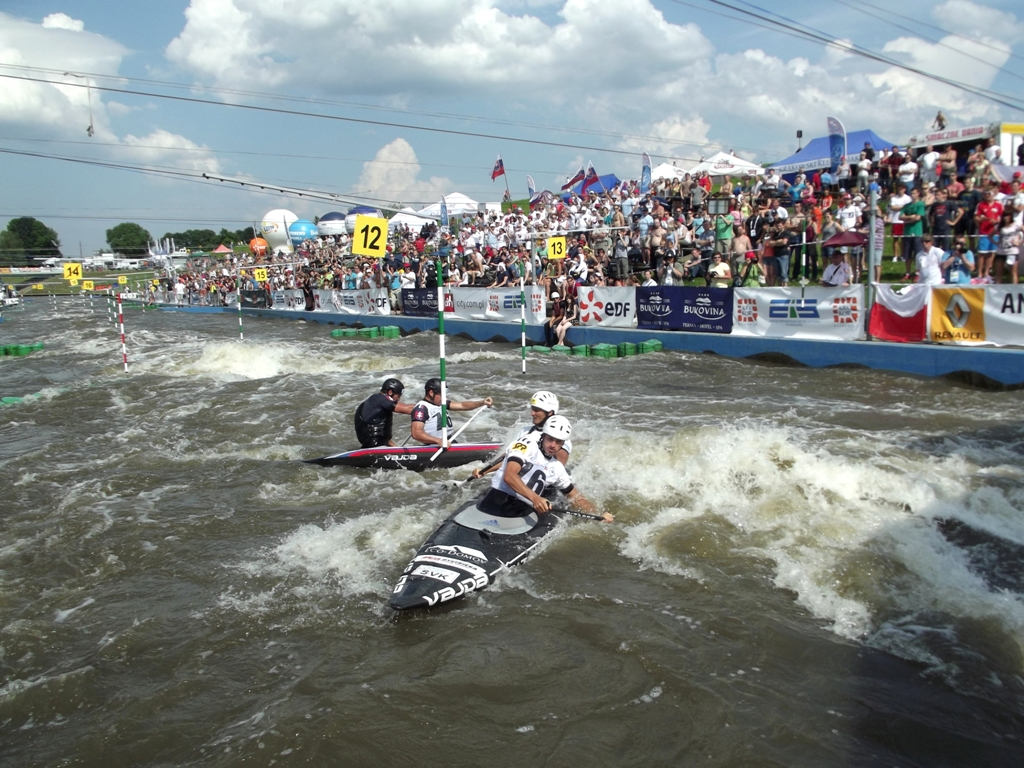
The C-2 team final. The first two Slovak boats pass gate #12.

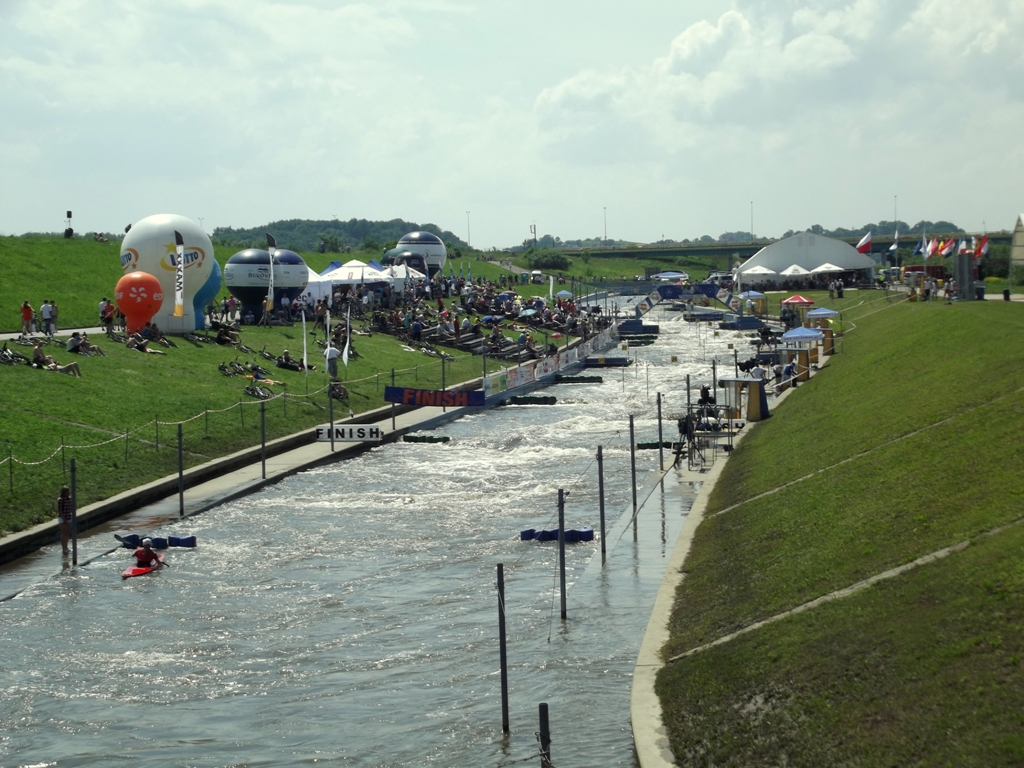
From the road bridge, the finish line
