= Katarína Macová =

Slovak slalom canoeist (born 1986)

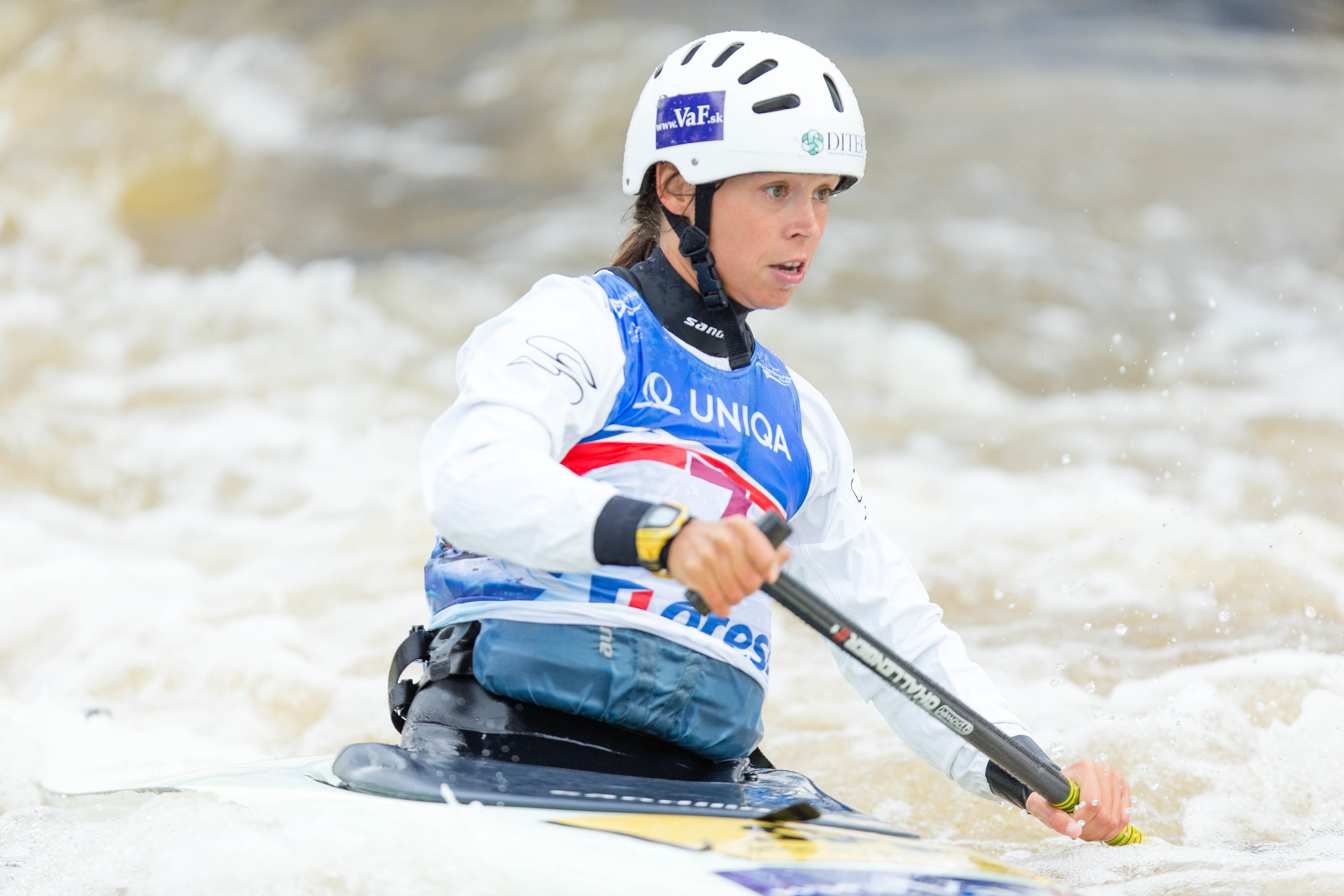
- Macová at the 2013 World Championships

Personal information
- Nationality: Slovak
- Born: 19 February 1986 (age 40) Bratislava, Czechoslovakia

Sport
- Country: Slovakia
- Sport: Canoe slalom
- Event: C1, K1
Medal record
Women's canoe slalom
Representing Slovakia
World Championships
Bronze medal – third place	2011 Bratislava	C1
European Championships
Gold medal – first place	2010 Bratislava	C1
U23 European Championships
Silver medal – second place	2005 Kraków	K1 team

Katarína Macová (born 19 February 1986 in Bratislava) is a Slovak slalom canoeist who competed at the international level from 2004 to 2013.

She started out in the K1 class, but moved over to the single canoe (C1) class since its inception for women in 2009, becoming one of the pioneers of the new discipline. She won a bronze medal in the C1 event at the 2011 ICF Canoe Slalom World Championships in Bratislava. She also won gold at the European Canoe Slalom Championships in 2010 on the same course, becoming the first European Champion in the women's C1 event.

After her racing career she has coached young slalom paddlers in New Zealand.

== Career statistics ==
=== Major championships results timeline ===
Event		2009	2010	2011	2012	2013
World Championships	C1	5 (Note: Exhibition event)	5	3	Not held	9
European Championships	C1	Not held	1	4	6	19

=== World Cup individual podiums ===
Season	Date	Venue	Position	Event
2010	19 Jun 2010	Prague	3rd	C1
2011	25 Jun 2011	Tacen	3rd	C1
2012	1 Sep 2012	Bratislava	1st	C1
