= Jana Dukátová =

Slovak slalom canoeist

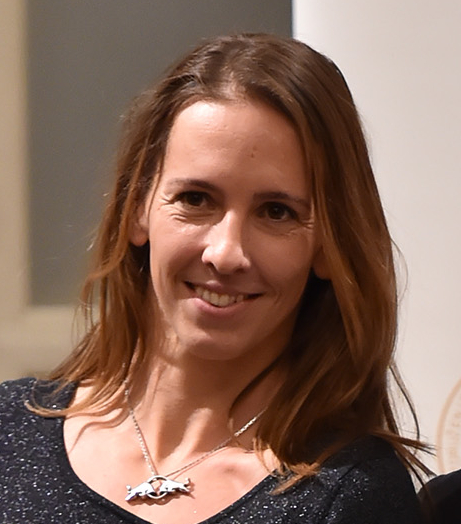
- Dukátová in 2016

Personal information
- Nationality: Slovak
- Born: 13 June 1983 (age 43) Bratislava, Czechoslovakia
- Years active: 1999 - 2021
- Height: 1.80 m (5 ft 11 in)
- Weight: 64 kg (141 lb)

Sport
- Country: Slovakia
- Sport: Canoe slalom
- Event: K1, C1
- Club: National Sport Center
- Coached by: Róbert Orokocký
- Retired: 2021
Medal record
Women's canoe slalom
Event	1st	2nd	3rd
World Championships	3	4	2
European Championships	4	5	5
U23 European Championships	3	1	0
Junior World Championships	0	1	0
Junior European Championships	0	0	1
Total	10	11	8
Representing Slovakia
World Championships
Gold medal – first place	2006 Prague	K1
Gold medal – first place	2010 Tacen	C1
Gold medal – first place	2011 Bratislava	K1 team
Silver medal – second place	2009 La Seu d'Urgell	K1 team
Silver medal – second place	2010 Tacen	K1
Silver medal – second place	2011 Bratislava	K1
Silver medal – second place	2017 Pau	K1
Bronze medal – third place	2014 Deep Creek Lake	K1 team
Bronze medal – third place	2021 Bratislava	K1 team
European Championships
Gold medal – first place	2005 Tacen	K1 team
Gold medal – first place	2006 L'Argentière-la-Bessée	K1 team
Gold medal – first place	2010 Bratislava	K1
Gold medal – first place	2015 Markkleeberg	K1 team
Silver medal – second place	2007 Liptovský Mikuláš	K1 team
Silver medal – second place	2008 Kraków	K1 team
Silver medal – second place	2009 Nottingham	K1 team
Silver medal – second place	2010 Bratislava	C1
Silver medal – second place	2011 La Seu d'Urgell	K1
Bronze medal – third place	2010 Bratislava	K1 team
Bronze medal – third place	2011 La Seu d'Urgell	K1 team
Bronze medal – third place	2012 Augsburg	K1 team
Bronze medal – third place	2016 Liptovský Mikuláš	K1
Bronze medal – third place	2016 Liptovský Mikuláš	K1 team
U23 European Championships
Gold medal – first place	2004 Kraków	K1
Gold medal – first place	2005 Kraków	K1
Gold medal – first place	2006 Nottingham	K1
Silver medal – second place	2005 Kraków	K1 team
Junior World Championships
Silver medal – second place	2000 Bratislava	K1 team
Junior European Championships
Bronze medal – third place	2001 Bratislava	K1 team

Jana Dukátová (born 13 June 1983) is a former Slovak slalom canoeist who competed at the international level from 1999 to 2021. She specialized in the K1 event for most of her career, although she was also one of the pioneers of the women's C1 discipline, becoming the first ever world champion. She stopped competing in C1 after 2010.

She won nine medals at the ICF Canoe Slalom World Championships with three golds (C1: 2010; K1: 2006; K1 team: 2011), four silvers (K1: 2010, 2011, 2017; K1 team: 2009) and two bronzes (K1 team: 2014, 2021).

She won the overall World Cup title four times in the K1 class (2009, 2010, 2011 and 2013). At the European Championships she won a total of 14 medals (4 golds, 5 silvers and 5 bronzes).

Dukátová qualified for the 2012 Summer Olympics in London after defeating double Olympic Champion Elena Kaliská in the Slovak selection process, four years after having lost to Kaliská in the selection trials for the 2008 Olympics. She finished in sixth place in the K1 event in London. She finished in fourth place in the same event at the 2016 Summer Olympics in Rio de Janeiro.

== Career ==
Dukátová's first major international competition were the 1999 European Junior Championships, where she finished 28th in the K1 event. One year later she won her first medal, a silver in the K1 team event at the 2000 World Junior Championships. She made the senior national team for the first time in 2002. She finished 39th in the K1 event in her debut at the World Championships. She also finished tenth in the overall World Cup standings.

She began to show her potential in 2004, winning the Under-23 European Championships, a feat she repeated in 2005 and 2006.

She earned her first World Cup podium in Athens in 2005, where she finished second and she backed it up with another silver in Augsburg that year. She was also part of the gold medal-winning team at the 2005 European Championships. She finished fourth in the World Cup standings in 2005.

2006 was a big breakthrough year for Jana, as she won the K1 world championship title in Prague. Once again, she finished fourth in the World Cup standings for 2006.

The following year was a disappointment for Jana as she lost the internal qualification for the 2008 Summer Olympics to the defending champion Elena Kaliská. At the World Championships she won the qualification, but then missed a gate in the semifinal and only finished 36th as a result. She had two World Cup podiums in 2007 and finished seventh in the overall standings. She earned two more World Cup medals in 2008, and a tenth overall finish.

Dukátová then went on to win three overall World Cup titles in a row between 2009 and 2011, racking up 3 wins and 10 podiums during that stretch. 2009 saw the introduction of the women's C1 as an exhibition event at the World Cups and World Championships and Dukátová was one of the first women to try the new discipline, winning an exhibition World Cup race in Bratislava. She continued to compete in C1 in 2010, when the discipline was given a full medal status. The 2010 European Championships took place on her home course in Bratislava and Jana took advantage by winning the K1 event and taking silver in the inaugural edition of the C1 event. She flipped the results at the 2010 World Championships in Tacen, where she became the first ever world women's C1 champion and won a silver medal in the K1.

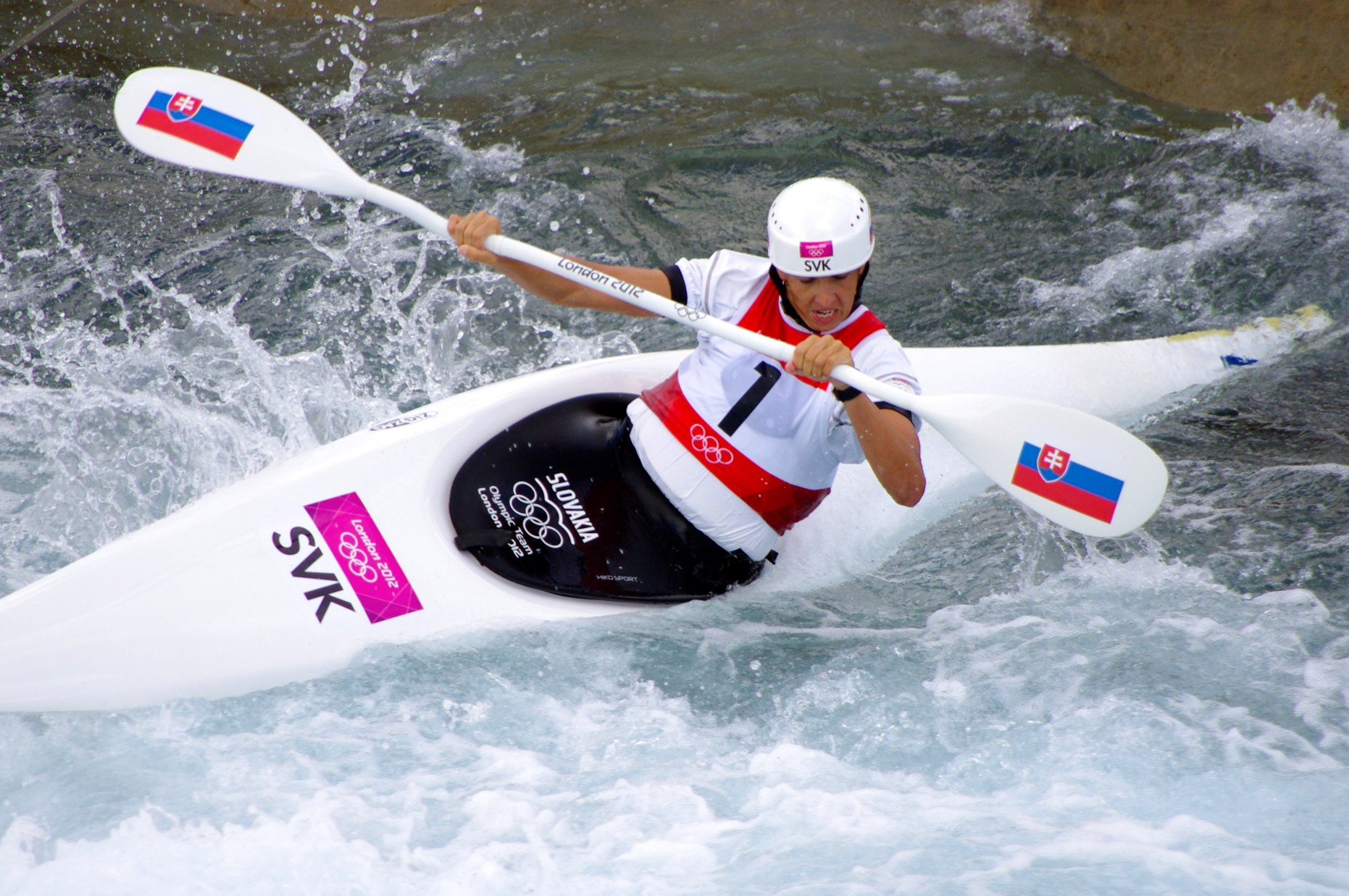
Jana Dukátová at the 2012 Olympic Games.

Despite her success in the canoe, she would drop the discipline from her program after the 2010 season to fully focus on her goal to qualify for her first Olympics. Women's C1 did not have Olympic status yet at that time. 2011 was another strong year from her as she won silver at both the European and World Championships.

Eventually she did qualify for the 2012 Summer Olympics in London, beating the two-time champion Kaliská. Coming into the competition as one of the favorites and world number 1, she finished in a disappointing sixth position. She finished the season with back-to-back World Cup wins in Prague and Bratislava.

She won her fourth and final overall World Cup title in 2013, despite only earning one podium during the season. She narrowly missed out on a medal at the World Championships in Prague, finishing fourth.

She earned one World Cup win in 2014 and one in 2015, finishing second in the overall standings on both occasions to her great rival Corinna Kuhnle. In 2015 they both amassed the same number of points, but Kuhnle won the tie-break, which was the better result in the World Cup final. Dukátová had also finished second to Kuhnle at the 2010 and 2011 World Championships.

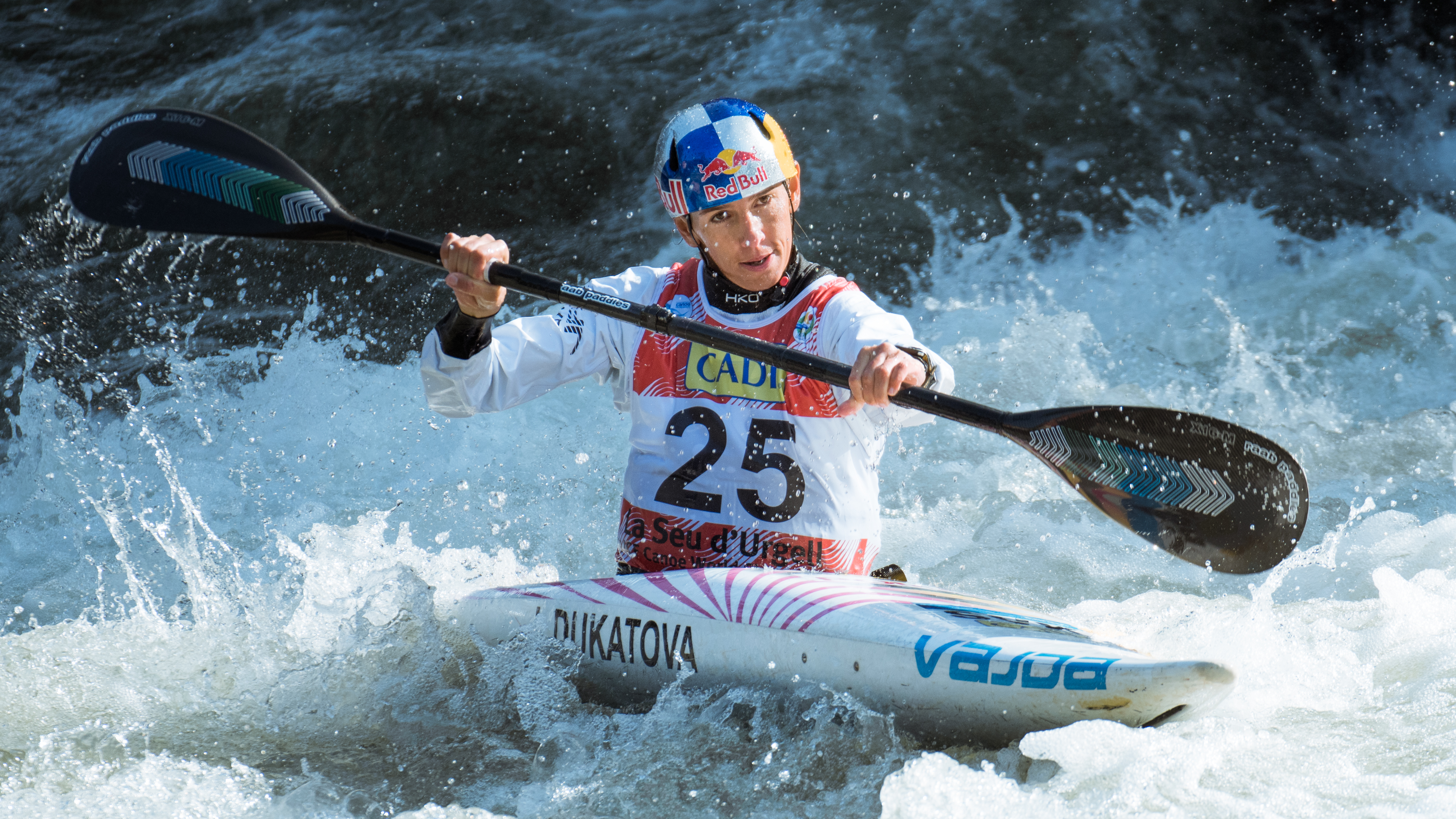
Jana Dukátová at the 2019 Canoe Slalom World Championships.

Dukátová made her second Olympic appearance in 2016 in Rio de Janeiro. This time she came much closer to a medal, finishing fourth while touching one gate in the final. Earlier in the year she claimed bronze at the European Championships in Liptovský Mikuláš. Her last individual medals came in 2017, when she won silver at a World Cup race in Augsburg and another silver at the World Championships in Pau.

She missed the entire 2018 season due to motherhood and came back in 2019, but was unable to recapture her best form. Along with the entire Slovak team she also skipped the entire 2020 international season due to the COVID-19 pandemic. 2021 was her final season and she managed to claim one last medal, a bronze in the K1 team event at the 2021 World Championships on her home course in Bratislava. Dukátová retired from the sport after these World Championships.

== Career statistics ==
=== Major championships results timeline ===
Event		2002	2003	2004	2005	2006	2007	2008	2009	2010	2011	2012	2013	2014	2015	2016	2017	2018	2019	2020	2021
Olympic Games	K1	Not held		—	Not held			—	Not held			6	Not held			4	Not held				—
World Championships	C1	Not held							—	1	—	Not held	—	—	—	Not held	—	—	—	Not held	—
World Championships	K1	39	—	Not held	20	1	36	Not held	6	2	2	Not held	4	13	6	Not held	2	—	24	Not held	17
World Championships	K1 team	—	—	Not held	DNF	4	4	Not held	2	6	1	Not held	6	3	5	Not held	7	—	6	Not held	3
European Championships	C1	Not held								2	—	—	—	—	—	—	—	—	—	—	—
European Championships	K1	—	Not held	11	7	21	4	6	9	1	2	9	21	10	12	3	15	—	23	—	17
European Championships	K1 team	13	Not held	2 (Note: Not a medal event due to low number of participating nations)	1	1	2	2	2	3	3	3	4	7	1	3	10	—	6	—	11

=== World Cup individual podiums ===
	1st place, gold medalist(s)	2nd place, silver medalist(s)	3rd place, bronze medalist(s)	Total
C1	0	2	0	2
K1	9	11	4	24
Total	9	13	4	26

Season	Date	Venue	Position	Event
2005	9 July 2005	Athens	2nd	K1
2005	17 July 2005	Augsburg	2nd	K1
2006	11 June 2006	La Seu d'Urgell	2nd	K1
2006	6 August 2006	Prague	1st	K1^{1}
2007	8 July 2007	Tacen	2nd	K1
2007	15 July 2007	Augsburg	3rd	K1
2008	21 June 2008	Prague	3rd	K1
2008	6 July 2008	Augsburg	2nd	K1
2009	1 February 2009	Mangahao	1st	K1^{2}
2009	28 June 2009	Pau	3rd	K1
2009	5 July 2009	Bratislava	3rd	K1
2009	12 July 2009	Augsburg	1st	K1
2010	21 February 2010	Penrith	2nd	C1^{3}
2010	27 June 2010	La Seu d'Urgell	2nd	C1
2010	4 July 2010	Augsburg	2nd	K1
2011	3 July 2011	L'Argentière-la-Bessée	1st	K1
2011	10 July 2011	Markkleeberg	1st	K1
2011	14 August 2011	Prague	2nd	K1
2012	10 June 2012	Cardiff	2nd	K1
2012	26 August 2012	Prague	1st	K1
2012	2 September 2012	Bratislava	1st	K1
2013	25 August 2013	Bratislava	2nd	K1
2014	15 June 2014	Tacen	1st	K1
2015	5 July 2015	Liptovský Mikuláš	1st	K1
2016	19 June 2016	Pau	2nd	K1
2017	25 June 2017	Augsburg	2nd	K1

^{1} World Championship counting for World Cup points
^{2} Oceania Championship counting for World Cup points
^{3} Oceania Canoe Slalom Open counting for World Cup points

== Personal life ==
Her life partner is her longtime coach Róbert Orokocký with whom she has a daughter Lívia. She took a break from the sport in 2018 due to pregnancy and motherhood.
