= Andrej Málek =

Slovak slalom canoeist (born 1995)

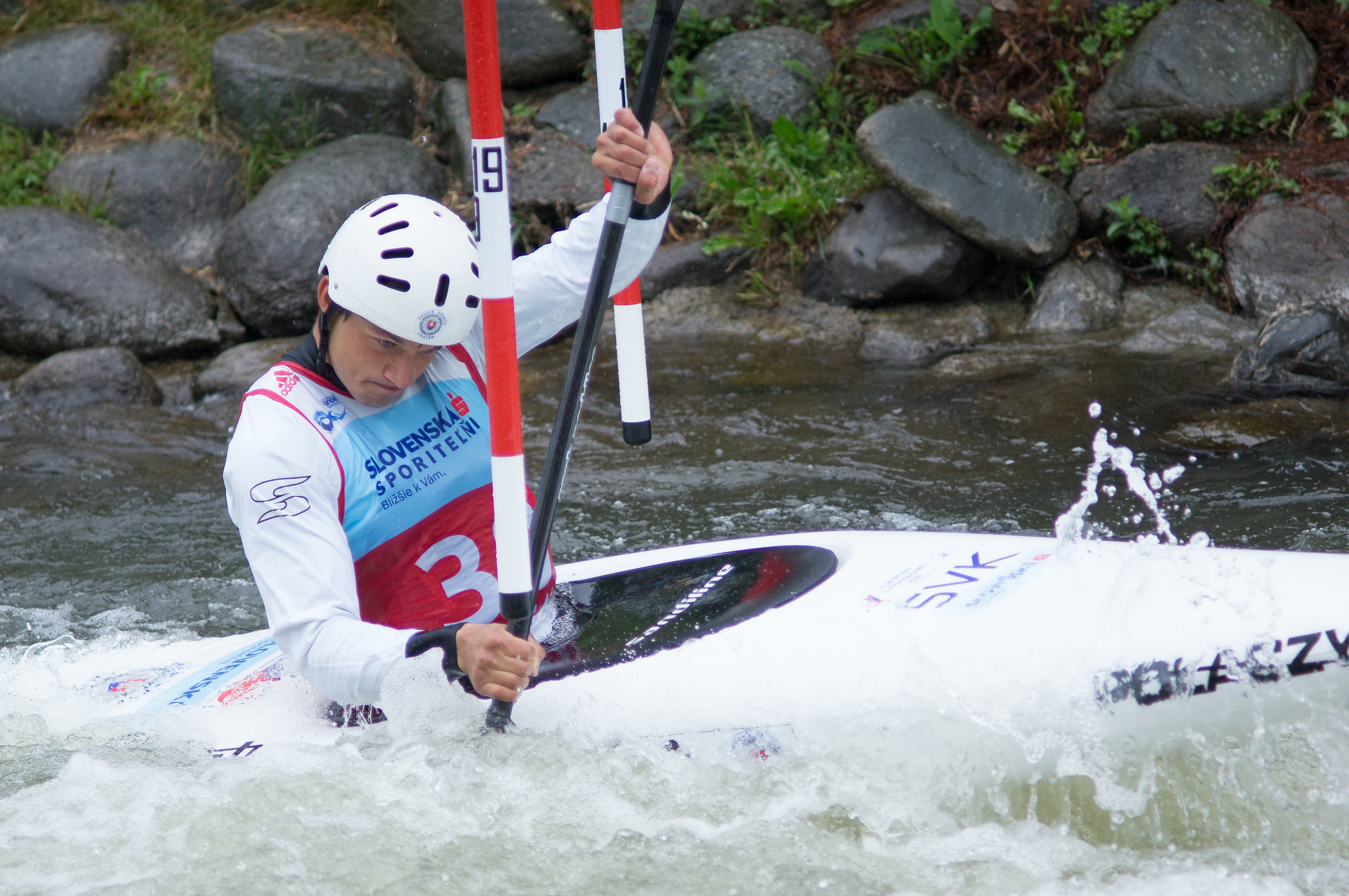
- Málek at the 2016 European Championships

Personal information
- Nationality: Slovak
- Born: 4 February 1995 (age 31)

Sport
- Country: Slovakia
- Sport: Canoe slalom
- Event: K1
Medal record
Representing Slovakia
World Championships
Silver medal – second place	2015 London	K1 team
European Championships
Bronze medal – third place	2015 Markkleeberg	K1
U23 World Championships
Silver medal – second place	2016 Kraków	K1 team
Bronze medal – third place	2014 Penrith	K1 team
Bronze medal – third place	2015 Foz do Iguaçu	K1
Bronze medal – third place	2016 Kraków	K1
U23 European Championships
Gold medal – first place	2016 Solkan	K1
Silver medal – second place	2018 Bratislava	K1 team
Junior World Championships
Silver medal – second place	2013 Liptovský Mikuláš	K1
Silver medal – second place	2013 Liptovský Mikuláš	K1 team
Junior European Championships
Bronze medal – third place	2011 Banja Luka	K1
Bronze medal – third place	2012 Solkan	K1
Bronze medal – third place	2012 Solkan	K1 team

Andrej Málek (born 4 February 1995) is a retired Slovak slalom canoeist who competed at the international level from 2010 to 2019. He retired from the sport in 2020.

He won a silver medal in the K1 team event at the 2015 ICF Canoe Slalom World Championships in London. He also won a bronze medal in the K1 event at the 2015 European Canoe Slalom Championships in Markkleeberg.

In 2019 he became the first Slovak paddler to win a men's K1 World Cup race, when he won on his home course in Bratislava.

== Career statistics ==
=== Major championships results timeline ===
Event		2015	2016	2017	2018	2019
World Championships	K1	40	Not held	24	—	50
World Championships	K1 team	2	Not held	8	—	24
European Championships	K1	3	20	10	—	44
European Championships	K1 team	4	8	12	—	12

=== World Cup individual podiums ===
Season	Date	Venue	Position	Event
2019	23 June 2019	Bratislava	1st	K1
