= Tomáš Kučera (canoeist) =

Slovak slalom canoeist (born 1985)

Personal information
- Nationality: Slovak
- Born: 21 January 1985 (age 41) Liptovský Mikuláš, Czechoslovakia
- Height: 1.80 m (5 ft 11 in)
- Weight: 74 kg (163 lb)

Sport
- Country: Slovakia
- Sport: Canoe slalom
- Event: C2, C1
Medal record
Men's canoe slalom
Representing Slovakia
World Championships
Gold medal – first place	2009 La Seu d'Urgell	C2 team
Silver medal – second place	2011 Bratislava	C2 team
Silver medal – second place	2013 Prague	C2 team
Silver medal – second place	2014 Deep Creek Lake	C2 team
Bronze medal – third place	2007 Foz do Iguaçu	C2 team
European Championships
Gold medal – first place	2014 Vienna	C2 team
Gold medal – first place	2015 Markkleeberg	C2 team
Gold medal – first place	2016 Liptovský Mikuláš	C2
Gold medal – first place	2016 Liptovský Mikuláš	C2 team
Bronze medal – third place	2008 Kraków	C2 team
Bronze medal – third place	2011 La Seu d'Urgell	C2 team
U23 European Championships
Gold medal – first place	2006 Nottingham	C2
Bronze medal – third place	2008 Solkan	C2
Junior World Championships
Bronze medal – third place	2002 Nowy Sącz	C1 team
Junior European Championships
Bronze medal – third place	2001 Bratislava	C1 team

Tomáš Kučera (born 21 January 1985 in Liptovský Mikuláš) is a retired Slovak slalom canoeist who competed at the international level from 2001 to 2018. He competed in the C1 event until 2005. He raced in the C2 event together with Ján Bátik from 2006 until 2018, when the discipline was discontinued.

Kučera and Bátik won five medals in the C2 team event at the ICF Canoe Slalom World Championships with a gold (2009), three silvers (2011, 2013, 2014) and a bronze (2007). They also won 4 golds and 2 bronzes at the European Championships, including a gold medal in the C2 event at the 2016 European Championships on their home course in Liptovský Mikuláš.

== Major championships results timeline ==
Event		2007	2008	2009	2010	2011	2012	2013	2014	2015	2016	2017	2018
World Championships	C2	17	Not held	6	10	9	Not held	14	18	22	Not held	8	Not held
World Championships	C2 team	3	Not held	1	4	2	Not held	2	2	6	Not held	3 (Note: Not a medal event due to low number of participating nations)	Not held
European Championships	C2	4	11	12	6	21	10	16	21	12	1	16	6
European Championships	C2 team	6	3	6	5	3	6	4	1	1	1	4	4
