= Škantár =

Škantár is a Slovak surname. Notable people with the surname include:

- Ladislav Škantár (born 1983), Slovak slalom canoeist
- Peter Škantár (born 1982), Slovak slalom canoeist
