= 2011 ICF Canoe Slalom World Championships =

Canoe slalom event in Bratislava, Slovakia

Coordinates: 48.030°N 17.230°E

The 2011 ICF Canoe Slalom World Championships took place from September 7–11, 2011 in Bratislava, Slovakia under the auspices of International Canoe Federation. It was the 34th edition. Bad weather conditions on September 7 and 8 forced the organizers to make changes to the schedule. The events were all held over the remaining three days of the Championships. The women's C1 team event debuted at these championships, but did not count as an official medal event due to insufficient number of participating federations.

The event was also the only global qualification for the 2012 Summer Olympics in London.

It was the first time Slovakia hosted the ICF Canoe Slalom World Championships. The races were held in the Čunovo Water Sports Centre on an offshoot of the river Danube near the borders with Austria and Hungary. Slovakia won the medal table with 3 golds, 2 silvers and 3 bronzes.

== Medal summary ==
=== Men's results ===
==== Canoe ====
Event	Gold	Points	Silver	Points	Bronze	Points
C1	Denis Gargaud Chanut (FRA)	101.14	Nico Bettge (GER)	103.83	Matej Beňuš (SVK)	103.91
C1 team	Slovakia; Michal Martikán; Alexander Slafkovský; Matej Beňuš	109.97	Germany; Sideris Tasiadis; Nico Bettge; Jan Benzien	114.95	Czech Republic; Stanislav Ježek; Vítězslav Gebas; Tomáš Indruch	115.74
C2	Slovakia; Pavol Hochschorner; Peter Hochschorner	106.76	France; Denis Gargaud Chanut; Fabien Lefèvre	107.49	Slovakia; Ladislav Škantár; Peter Škantár	109.86
C2 team	France; Gauthier Klauss & Matthieu Péché; Pierre Labarelle & Nicolas Peschier; Denis Gargaud Chanut & Fabien Lefèvre	127.27	Slovakia; Pavol Hochschorner & Peter Hochschorner; Ladislav Škantár & Peter Škantár; Tomáš Kučera & Ján Bátik	127.94	Great Britain; David Florence & Richard Hounslow; Tim Baillie & Etienne Stott; Rhys Davies & Matthew Lister	129.51

==== Kayak ====
Event	Gold	Points	Silver	Points	Bronze	Points
K1	Peter Kauzer (SLO)	96.01	Mateusz Polaczyk (POL)	97.22	Fabien Lefèvre (FRA)	98.89
K1 team	Germany; Sebastian Schubert; Hannes Aigner; Alexander Grimm	110.79	France; Boris Neveu; Vivien Colober; Fabien Lefèvre	111.83	Italy; Giovanni De Gennaro; Daniele Molmenti; Omar Raiba	112.44

=== Women's results ===
==== Canoe ====
Event	Gold	Points	Silver	Points	Bronze	Points
C1	Kateřina Hošková (CZE)	138.58	Cen Nanqin (CHN)	140.13	Katarína Macová (SVK)	140.24
C1 team (non-medal event)	Australia; Jessica Fox; Rosalyn Lawrence; Leanne Guinea	179.44	China; Teng Qianqian; Cen Nanqin; Xu Yanru	194.69	Germany; Mira Louen; Michaela Grimm; Lena Stöcklin	230.51

==== Kayak ====
Event	Gold	Points	Silver	Points	Bronze	Points
K1	Corinna Kuhnle (AUT)	110.05	Jana Dukátová (SVK)	113.33	Maialen Chourraut (ESP)	113.58
K1 team	Slovakia; Elena Kaliská; Jana Dukátová; Dana Mann	131.90	Czech Republic; Štěpánka Hilgertová; Irena Pavelková; Kateřina Kudějová	132.25	Germany; Jasmin Schornberg; Melanie Pfeifer; Claudia Bär	134.77

== Medal table ==
This does not count the C1 women's team event.

Rank	Nation	Gold	Silver	Bronze	Total
1	Slovakia (SVK)	3	2	3	8
2	France (FRA)	2	2	1	5
3	Germany (GER)	1	2	1	4
4	Czech Republic (CZE)	1	1	1	3
5	Austria (AUT)	1	0	0	1
5	Slovenia (SLO)	1	0	0	1
7	China (CHN)	0	1	0	1
7	Poland (POL)	0	1	0	1
9	Great Britain (GBR)	0	0	1	1
9	Italy (ITA)	0	0	1	1
9	Spain (ESP)	0	0	1	1
Totals (11 entries)		9	9	9	27
