= Monika Jančová =

Czech slalom canoeist (born 1992)

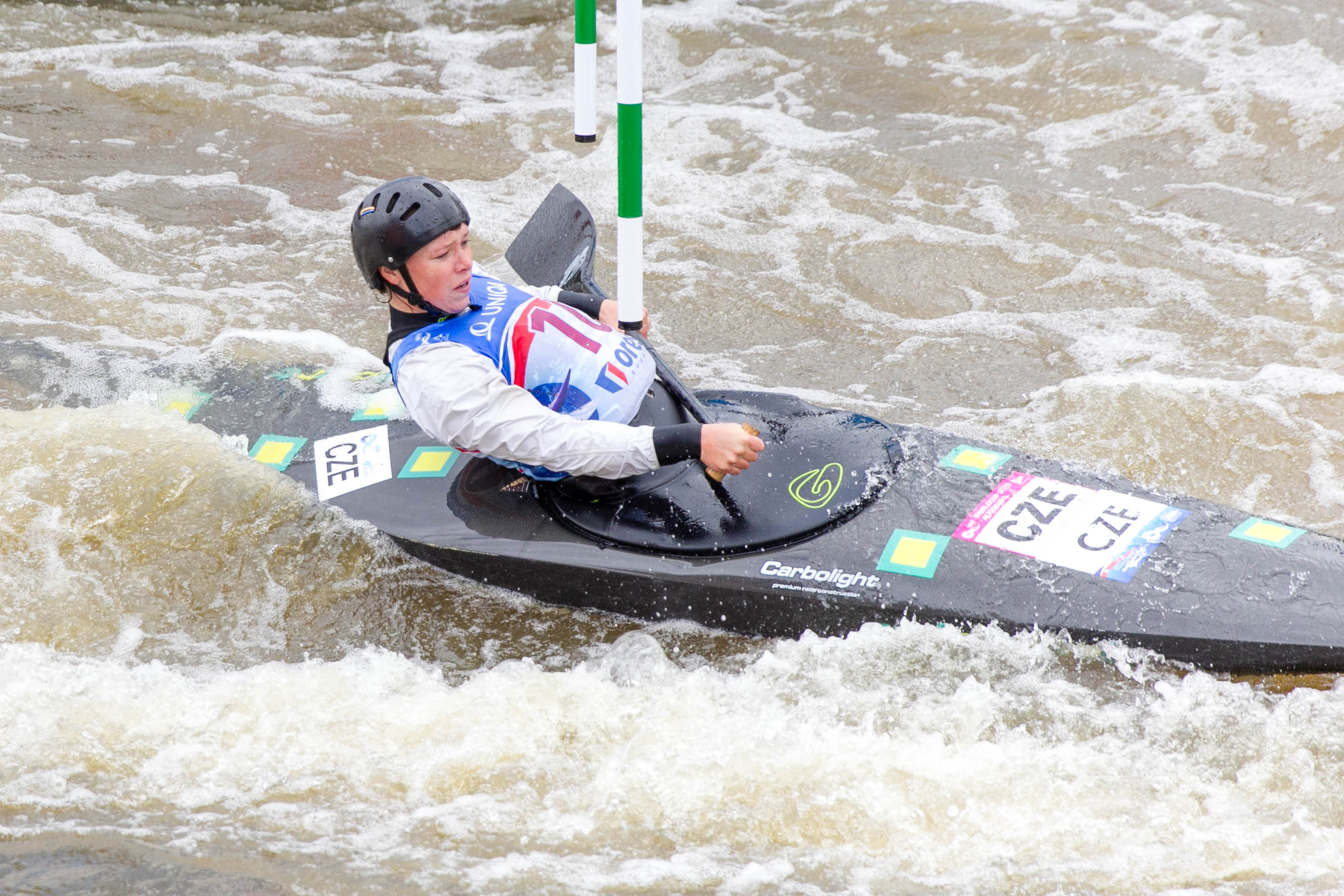
- Jančová at the 2013 World Championships

Personal information
- Born: 19 March 1992 (age 34)
Medal record
Women's canoe slalom
Representing Czech Republic
World Championships
Silver medal – second place	2013 Prague	C1 team
Silver medal – second place	2015 London	C1 team
Bronze medal – third place	2017 Pau	C1 team
European Championships
Silver medal – second place	2015 Markkleeberg	C1 team
Silver medal – second place	2016 Liptovský Mikuláš	C1 team
Bronze medal – third place	2017 Tacen	C1 team
U23 World Championships
Silver medal – second place	2012 Wausau	C1
Silver medal – second place	2014 Penrith	C1
Silver medal – second place	2015 Foz do Iguaçu	C1 team
U23 European Championships
Gold medal – first place	2012 Solkan	C1
Gold medal – first place	2015 Kraków	C1
Bronze medal – third place	2013 Bourg-Saint-Maurice	C1
Bronze medal – third place	2014 Skopje	C1
Bronze medal – third place	2015 Kraków	C1 team

Monika Jančová (born 19 March 1992) is a Czech slalom canoeist who has competed at the international level since 2011.

She won three medals in the C1 team event at the ICF Canoe Slalom World Championships with two silvers (2013, 2015) and a bronze (2017). She also won two silvers and a bronze in the same event at the European Championships.

== World Cup individual podiums ==
Season	Date	Venue	Position	Event
2013	17 Aug 2013	Tacen	3rd	C1
2017	17 Jun 2017	Prague	3rd	C1
