= Jasmin Schornberg =

German slalom canoeist

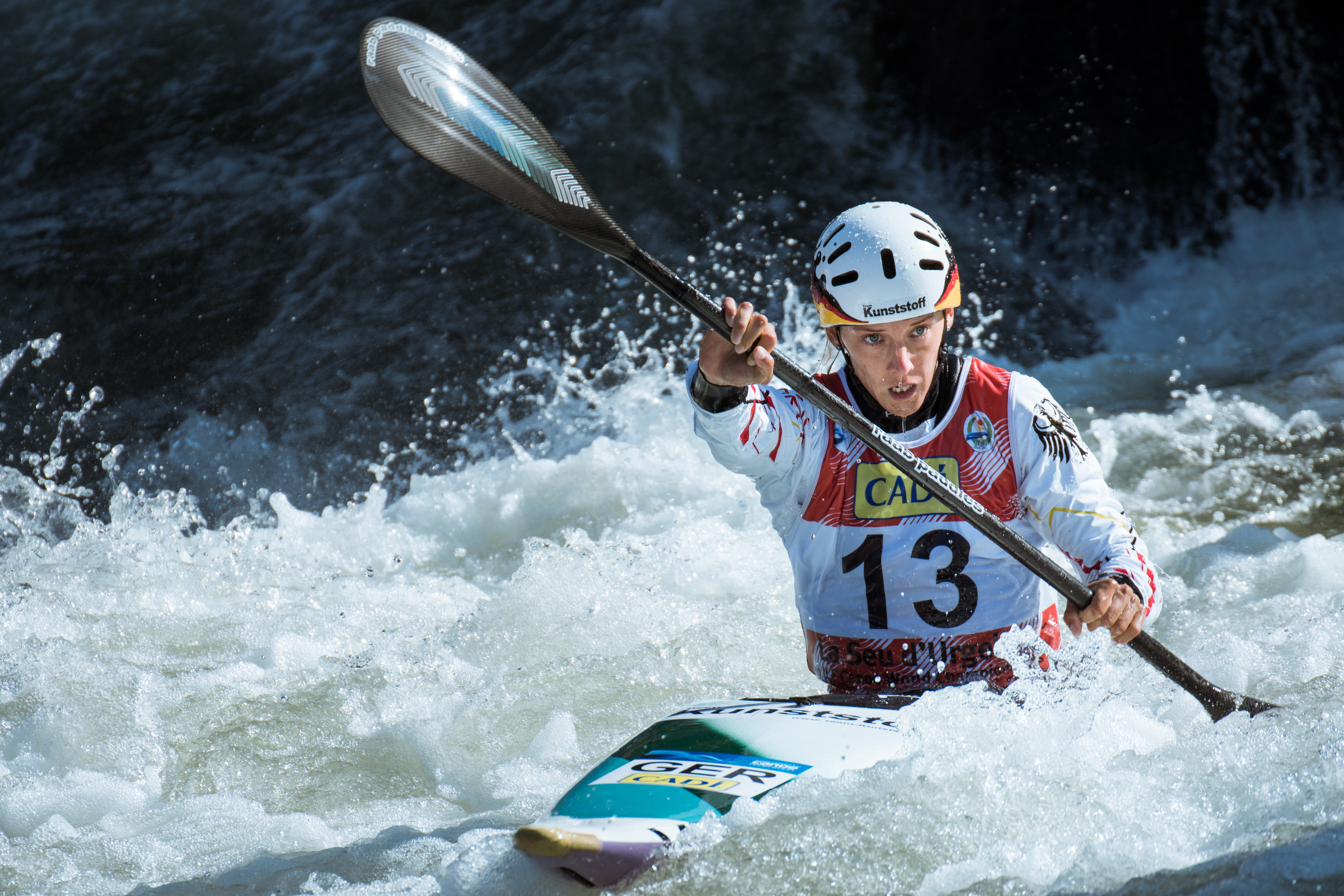

Personal information
- Nationality: German
- Born: 7 April 1986 (age 40) Lippstadt, West Germany
- Height: 1.76 m (5 ft 9 in)
- Weight: 63 kg (139 lb)

Sport
- Country: Germany
- Sport: Canoe slalom
- Event: K1, Mixed C2, C1
- Club: Kanu-Ring Hamm
Medal record
Women's canoe slalom
Representing Germany
World Championships
Gold medal – first place	2007 Foz do Iguaçu	K1 team
Gold medal – first place	2009 La Seu d'Urgell	K1
Gold medal – first place	2017 Pau	K1 team
Gold medal – first place	2022 Augsburg	K1 team
Silver medal – second place	2010 Tacen	K1 team
Silver medal – second place	2013 Prague	K1 team
Silver medal – second place	2018 Rio de Janeiro	K1 team
Bronze medal – third place	2006 Prague	K1 team
Bronze medal – third place	2009 La Seu d'Urgell	K1 team
Bronze medal – third place	2011 Bratislava	K1 team
Bronze medal – third place	2013 Prague	K1
European Championships
Gold medal – first place	2007 Liptovský Mikuláš	K1 team
Gold medal – first place	2008 Kraków	K1 team
Gold medal – first place	2010 Bratislava	K1 team
Gold medal – first place	2012 Augsburg	K1 team
Gold medal – first place	2018 Prague	K1 team
Silver medal – second place	2016 Liptovský Mikuláš	K1 team
Silver medal – second place	2019 Pau	C1 team
Silver medal – second place	2019 Pau	K1 team
Bronze medal – third place	2009 Nottingham	K1 team
Bronze medal – third place	2019 Pau	K1
U23 European Championships
Gold medal – first place	2005 Kraków	K1 team
Junior World Championships
Gold medal – first place	2004 Lofer	K1
Gold medal – first place	2002 Nowy Sącz	K1 team
Gold medal – first place	2004 Lofer	K1 team
Junior European Championships
Gold medal – first place	2003 Hohenlimburg	K1 team
Bronze medal – third place	2003 Hohenlimburg	K1

Jasmin Schornberg (born 7 April 1986) is a German slalom canoeist who competed at the international level from 2001 to 2023.

She won 11 medals at the ICF Canoe Slalom World Championships with four golds (K1: 2009, K1 team: 2007, 2017, 2022), three silvers (K1 team: 2010, 2013, 2018) and four bronzes (K1: 2013; K1 team: 2006, 2009, 2011).

She is the overall World Cup champion in K1 from 2007. She also won 10 medals in the European Championships (5 golds, 3 silvers and 2 bronzes).

Schornberg finished 5th in the K1 event at the 2012 Summer Olympics in London.

== World Cup individual podiums ==
Season	Date	Venue	Position	Event
2007	15 July 2007	Augsburg	2nd	K1
2010	20 June 2010	Prague	1st	K1
2013	30 June 2013	Augsburg	2nd	K1
2013	25 August 2013	Bratislava	3rd	K1
2014	15 June 2014	Tacen	2nd	K1
2015	21 June 2015	Prague	1st	K1
2018	7 July 2018	Augsburg	1st	Mixed C2
