= Bastien Damiens =

French kayaker (1995–2015)

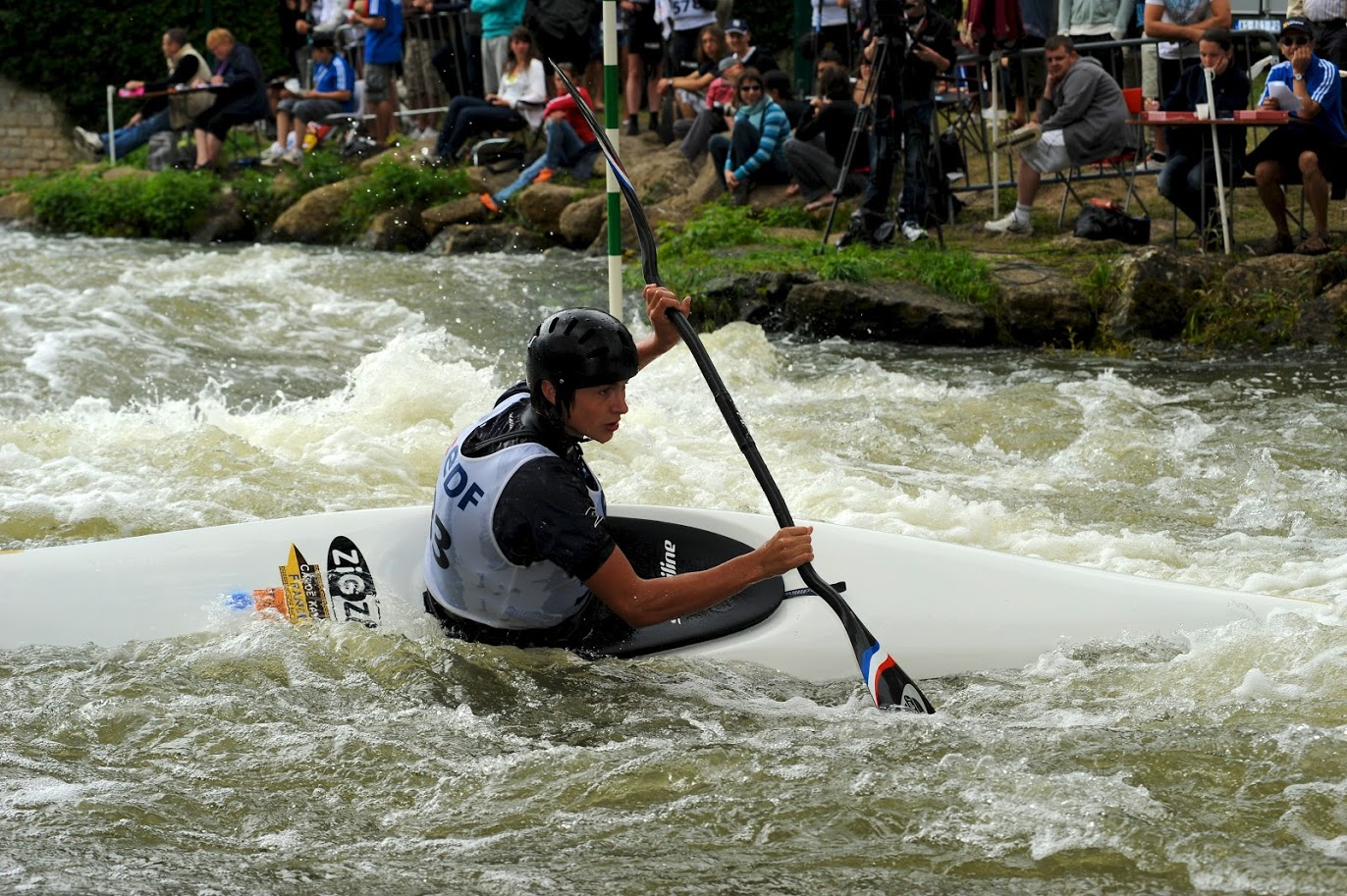
- Bastien Damiens in 2011

Medal record

Men's canoe slalom

Representing France

European Championships
Gold medal – first place	2012 Augsburg	K1 team

U23 European Championships
Gold medal – first place	2012 Solkan	K1 team
Gold medal – first place	2015 Kraków	K1 team

Junior World Championships
Gold medal – first place	2013 Liptovský Mikuláš	K1 team
Bronze medal – third place	2013 Liptovský Mikuláš	K1

Junior European Championships
Silver medal – second place	2012 Solkan	K1
Silver medal – second place	2013 Bourg-Saint-Maurice	K1

Bastien Damiens (18 January 1995 – 6 September 2015) was a French slalom canoeist who competed at the international level from 2011 until his death in 2015. He was born in Montreuil, Pas-de-Calais.

Damiens won gold in the K1 team event at the 2012 European Canoe Slalom Championships in Augsburg.

Damiens died at the age of 20 after falling from the fifth floor of a building.

== Biography ==
A native of Montreuil-sur-Mer, Bastien Damiens began Outline of canoeing and kayaking at the nearby C.k.c. Beaurainvillois club, where he took his first steps in the sport. His immense talent soon became apparent at this small regional club (where he was mentored by former champion Baptiste Delaplace), and he quickly joined the Montreuil Canoe-Kayak Club, a leading club for slalom in the Pas-de-Calais region.

In his very first year competing in the cadet division (ages 15–16) in 2010, the first category in which one can officially compete at the national level, his talent really took off: after winning the National 2 event in Épinal, he was propelled into National 1 (the highest French division) in slalom in his second year in the cadet category—a feat that hadn’t been achieved in men’s kayaking since Fabien Lefèvre. That first year in N1 allowed him to easily reach new milestones: a multiple race winner on the N1 circuit, he set records by sweeping aside many of his competitors who were much older and more experienced than he was. In the cadet division, his dominance was relentless, and he ended 2010 and 2011 with two French championship titles won in Bourg-Saint-Maurice and Metz.

For him, 2012 was the year of his breakthrough: he qualified for the French senior national team (the adult category) even though he was only in his first year as a junior (ages 17–18), notably edging out former world champion Fabien Lefèvre (who would say of him, “He is the future ”) and former Olympic champion Benoît Peschier, and went on to win the team gold medal at the European Championships in Augsburg, alongside his prestigious teammates Boris Neveu and Étienne Daille. Competing in his age group as well, he won a silver medal at the European Junior Championships in Solkan. In 2013, he continued to improve and took third place at the Junior World Championships held in Liptovský Mikuláš, before winning the silver medal at the Junior European Championships in Bourg-Saint-Maurice. He took the opportunity to win the team race titles at both events, while also claiming the national title at the L'Argentière-la-Bessée pool.

Now very close to the top, he has his sights set on the 2016 Summer Olympics, where only one kayaker will be allowed to represent France in slalom. However, 2014 was a disappointing year for him, as he failed to retain his spot on the French national team, while 2015 allowed him to regain some of his former glory: after qualifying for the French “espoirs” " (under-23) team, he won one final title in Kraków in the team race at the European Championships in late August 2015.

He died in a household accident on September 6, 2015, after falling from the 5th floor of a building in downtown Lille.
