= Claudia Bär =

German canoeist (1980–2015)

Medal record

Women's canoe slalom

Representing Germany

World Championships
Silver medal – second place	2003 Augsburg	K1 team
Silver medal – second place	2013 Prague	K1 team
Bronze medal – third place	2006 Prague	K1 team
Bronze medal – third place	2009 La Seu d'Urgell	K1 team
Bronze medal – third place	2011 Bratislava	K1 team

European Championships
Gold medal – first place	2008 Kraków	K1 team
Gold medal – first place	2011 La Seu d'Urgell	K1
Silver medal – second place	2005 Tacen	K1 team

Junior World Championships
Silver medal – second place	1998 Lofer	K1
Silver medal – second place	1998 Lofer	K1 team

Junior European Championships
Silver medal – second place	1997 Nowy Sącz	K1 team

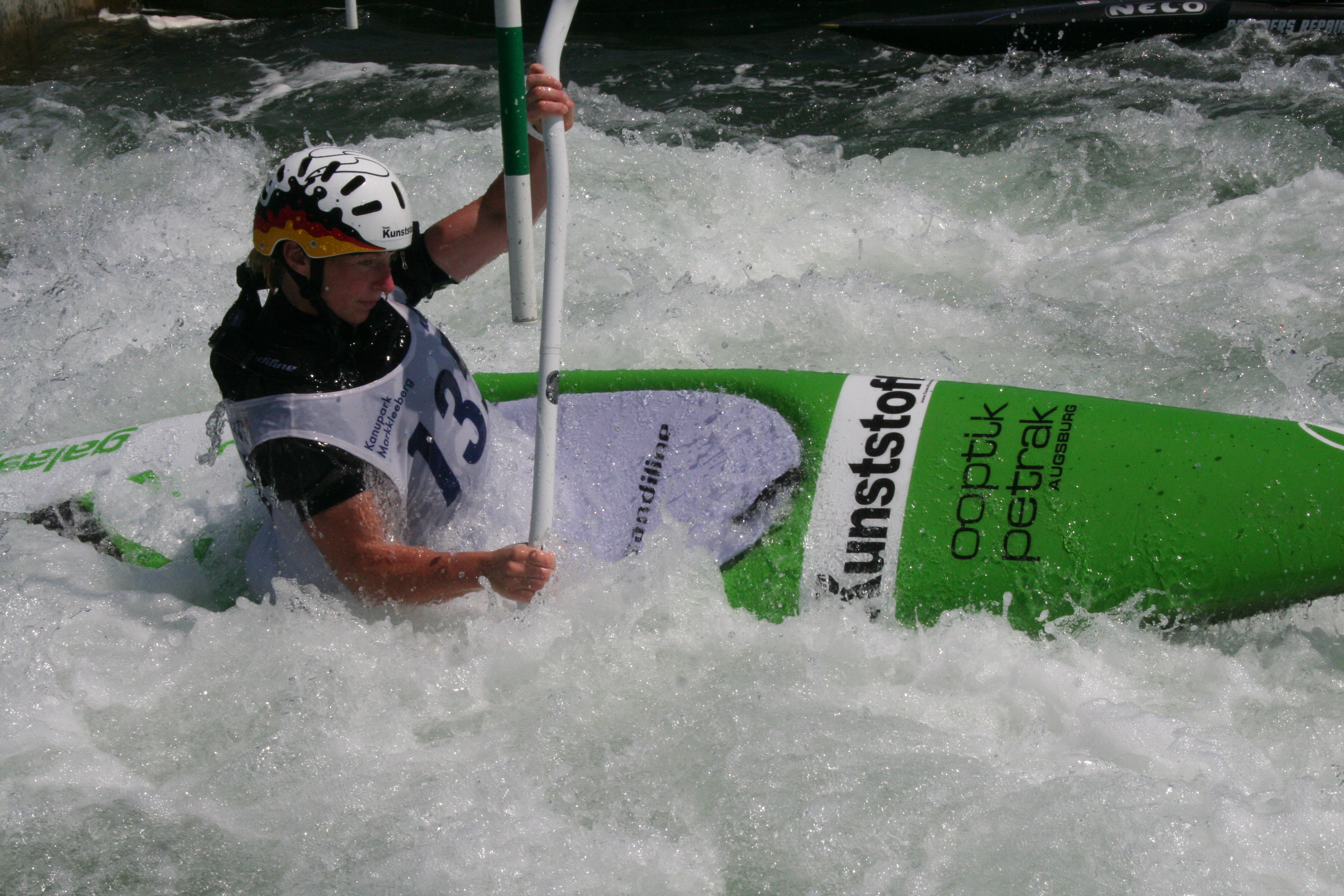
Bär during a caneoing course

Claudia Bär (9 April 1980 – 28 September 2015) was a German slalom canoeist who competed at the international level from 1995 to 2013.

She won five medals in the K1 team event at the ICF Canoe Slalom World Championships with two silvers (2003, 2013) and three bronzes (2006, 2009, 2011). She also won two golds and one silver at the European Championships.

Bär was diagnosed with leukemia in 2013 and eventually succumbed to the illness in 2015. She dated slalom canoeist Sideris Tasiadis until her death.
