= Vivien Colober =

French slalom canoeist

Medal record

Men's canoe slalom

Representing France

World Championships
Silver medal – second place	2011 Bratislava	K1 team

European Championships
Bronze medal – third place	2011 La Seu d'Urgell	K1 team

U23 World Championships
Silver medal – second place	2012 Wausau	K1 team

U23 European Championships
Gold medal – first place	2010 Markkleeberg	K1 team
Gold medal – first place	2012 Solkan	K1 team
Silver medal – second place	2013 Bourg St. Maurice	K1 team
Bronze medal – third place	2010 Markkleeberg	K1

Junior World Championships
Gold medal – first place	2008 Roudnice nad Labem	K1 team

Junior European Championships
Gold medal – first place	2007 Kraków	K1 team

Vivien Colober (born 6 October 1990) is a French slalom canoeist who competed at the international level from 2007 to 2015.

He won a silver medal in the K1 team event at the 2011 ICF Canoe Slalom World Championships in Bratislava and bronze medal in the same event at the 2011 European Championships in La Seu d'Urgell.

== World Cup individual podiums ==
Season	Date	Venue	Position	Event
2012	23 Jun 2012	La Seu d'Urgell	3rd	K1
