= Peter Škantár =

Slovak slalom canoeist

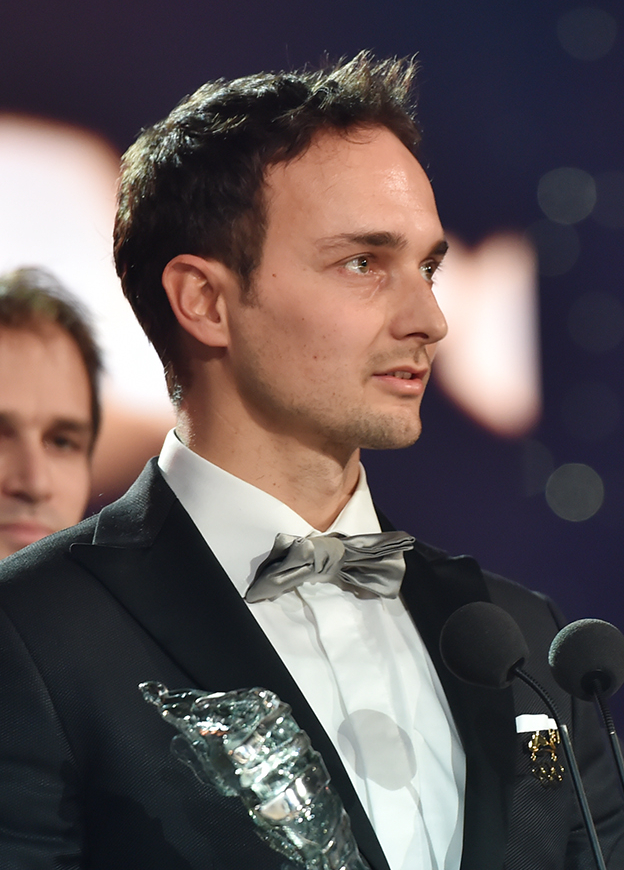
- Škantár in 2017

Personal information
- Born: 20 July 1982 (age 43) Kežmarok, Czechoslovakia
- Years active: 1996 - 2021
- Height: 182 cm (6 ft 0 in)
- Weight: 78 kg (172 lb)

Sport
- Sport: Canoe slalom
- Event: C2
- Club: ŠKP Bratislava
- Retired: 2021
Medal record
Representing Slovakia
Event	1st	2nd	3rd
Olympic Games	1	0	0
World Championships	1	5	4
European Championships	7	1	5
U23 European Championships	3	0	1
Junior World Championships	0	1	0
Total	12	7	10
Olympic Games
Gold medal – first place	2016 Rio de Janeiro	C2
World Championships
Gold medal – first place	2009 La Seu d'Urgell	C2 team
Silver medal – second place	2009 La Seu d'Urgell	C2
Silver medal – second place	2011 Bratislava	C2 team
Silver medal – second place	2013 Prague	C2 team
Silver medal – second place	2014 Deep Creek Lake	C2 team
Silver medal – second place	2017 Pau	C2
Bronze medal – third place	2007 Foz do Iguaçu	C2 team
Bronze medal – third place	2011 Bratislava	C2
Bronze medal – third place	2013 Prague	C2
Bronze medal – third place	2014 Deep Creek Lake	C2
European Championships
Gold medal – first place	2005 Tacen	C2 team
Gold medal – first place	2007 Liptovský Mikuláš	C2
Gold medal – first place	2010 Bratislava	C2
Gold medal – first place	2014 Vienna	C2
Gold medal – first place	2014 Vienna	C2 team
Gold medal – first place	2015 Markkleeberg	C2 team
Gold medal – first place	2016 Liptovský Mikuláš	C2 team
Silver medal – second place	2008 Kraków	C2
Bronze medal – third place	2004 Skopje	C2
Bronze medal – third place	2005 Tacen	C2
Bronze medal – third place	2008 Kraków	C2 team
Bronze medal – third place	2011 La Seu d'Urgell	C2
Bronze medal – third place	2011 La Seu d'Urgell	C2 team
U23 European Championships
Gold medal – first place	2002 Bratislava	C2
Gold medal – first place	2004 Kraków	C2
Gold medal – first place	2005 Kraków	C2
Bronze medal – third place	2004 Kraków	C2 team
Junior World Championships
Silver medal – second place	2000 Bratislava	C2

Peter Škantár (born 20 July 1982) is a retired Slovak slalom canoeist who competed at the international level from 1998 to 2018, specializing in the C2 discipline, where he teamed up with his cousin Ladislav Škantár.

Peter and Ladislav won an Olympic gold medal in 2016 in Rio de Janeiro in the C2 event. They also won ten medals at the ICF Canoe Slalom World Championships with a gold (C2 team: 2009), five silvers (C2: 2009, 2017; C2 team: 2011, 2013, 2014) and four bronzes (C2: 2011, 2013, 2014; C2 team: 2007). At the European Championships they won a total of 13 medals (7 golds, 1 silver and 5 bronzes).

The Škantárs won the overall World Cup title in the C2 category in 2009, 2010 and 2014.

== Career ==
The Škantár cousins made their international debut at the 1998 World Junior Canoe Slalom Championships, where they finished in 10th position in the individual C2 event. They made their debut at the senior World Championships one year later in La Seu d'Urgell, finishing in 26th position. Peter was 17 years old at the time.

They won their first medal, silver, at the 2000 World Junior Canoe Slalom Championships in Bratislava. They won 3 European under-23 titles in 2002, 2004 and 2005.

Their first success in the senior ranks came in 2003, when they took bronze in a World Cup race in Penrith. They collected more bronze medals in the two following years, including at the 2004 and 2005 European Championships and three bronze medals in the 2005 World Cup season. They also finished 3rd in the overall World Cup standings that year. The following year was a disappointing one as they failed to make the national team and thus were unable to compete at international events.

They came back stronger in 2007 by winning their first individual European gold. However, they were still unable to qualify for the 2008 Summer Olympics after losing to then two-time defending champions Pavol and Peter Hochschorner.

2009 brought their first World Cup victory in Pau and their first overall World Cup title. They also won their first individual World Championship medal in La Seu d'Urgell that year, finishing runners-up to the Hochschorner twins, missing the gold by just 0.14 seconds. They defended their World Cup title in 2010, winning two races and they also captured their second individual European title.

Winning bronze at both European and World Championships in 2011 would once again not be enough to qualify for the 2012 Summer Olympics. Yet again they were bested in the internal qualification by the Hochschorner twins, who won the world title in 2011 and already had 3 Olympic golds to their name.

They won yet another bronze at two 2013 World Championships in Prague.

The Škantár cousins were in dominant form in 2014. They started the year by winning their third individual European title. They also won 3 out 5 World Cup races and the overall title for the third and final time in their careers. They finished the year with a bronze medal at the 2014 World Championships at Deep Creek Lake.

2015 was a disappointing season by their standards, without any major achievements outside a team gold at the European Championships. Ironically, they had done enough to qualify for their first Olympic Games.

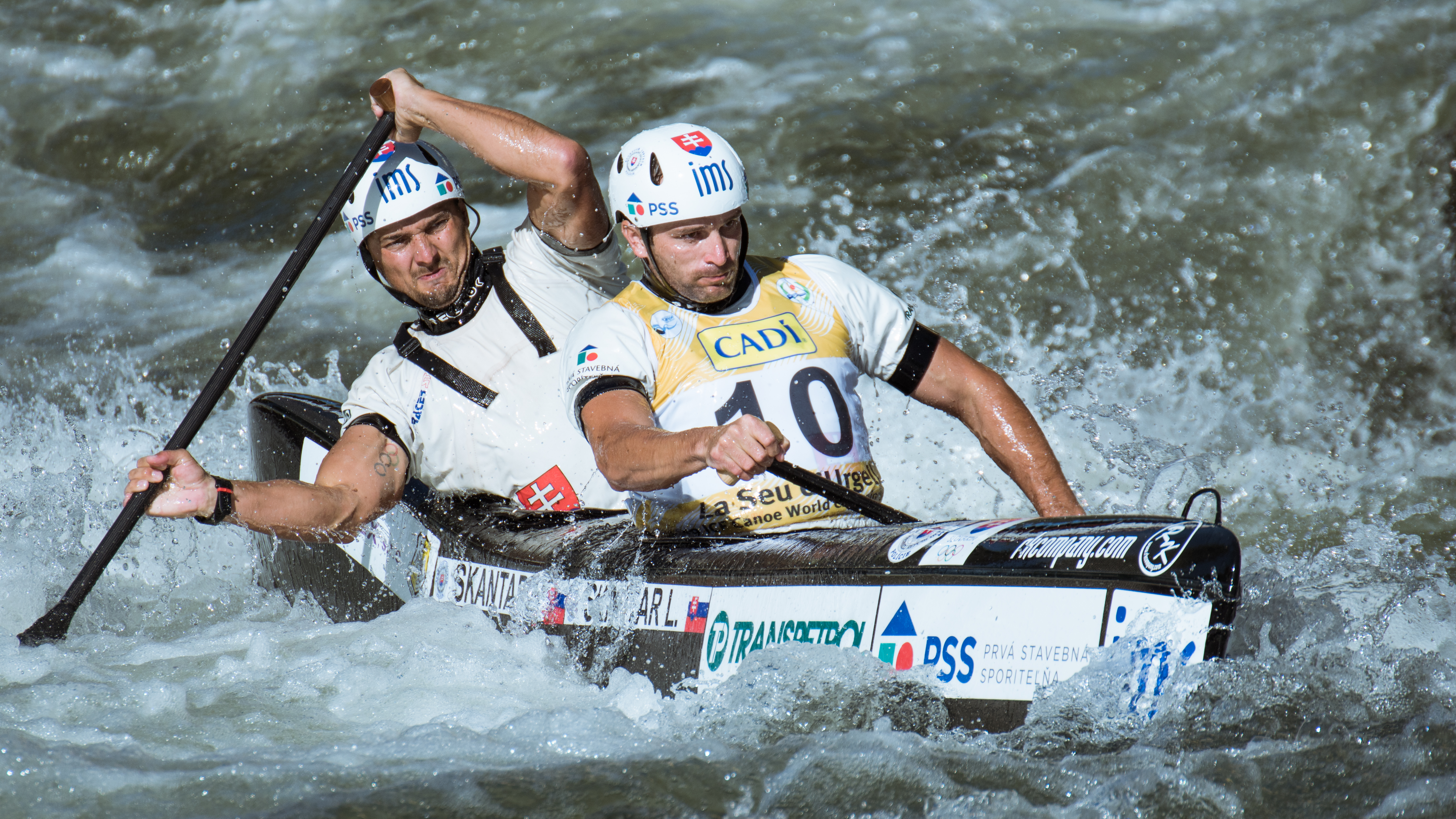
Peter Škantár (back) during the 2019 Wildwater Canoe World Championships.

Coming into the 2016 Summer Olympics in Rio de Janeiro, the Škantár cousins have not shown great form. They finished 6th at the European championships and 5th in their only World Cup start prior to the games. Their first qualifying run at the games was enough win the preliminary round and advance to the 11-boat semifinal. They had two gate touches in the semifinal and only finished 6th, but did enough to advance to the final. Their final run was more than 6 seconds faster than the winning time from the semifinal and even though there were still 5 boats to come after they finished their run, they were able to hold on to the top position and win the gold. Since the C2 event was subsequently discontinued, they will likely remain as the last Olympic champions in the C2 discipline.

They carried their Olympic form to the rest of the 2016 season, winning the last 2 rounds of the World Cup. They took one last World Cup win in 2017 and missed out on winning the world title by 0.07 seconds, finishing second to Gauthier Klauss and Matthieu Péché. It was the closest they would ever come to winning an individual world title.

Both cousins retired from canoe slalom in 2018 after the C2 event was discontinued and subsequently switched to wildwater canoeing. They announced retirement from wildwater canoeing during the 2021 World Championships in their hometown Bratislava where they didn't start due to Ladislav's injury.

As a coach Peter Škantár has coached Matej Beňuš.

== Career statistics ==
=== Major championships results timeline ===
Event		1999	2000	2001	2002	2003	2004	2005	2006	2007	2008	2009	2010	2011	2012	2013	2014	2015	2016	2017	2018
Olympic Games	C2	Not held	—	Not held			—	Not held			—	Not held			—	Not held			1	Not held	
World Championships	C2	26	Not held		—	—	Not held	6	—	9	Not held	2	14	3	Not held	3	3	16	Not held	2	Not held
World Championships	C2 team	—	Not held		—	—	Not held	—	—	3	Not held	1	4	2	Not held	2	2	6	Not held	3 (Note: Not a medal event due to low number of participating nations)	Not held
European Championships	C2	Not held	—	Not held	—	Not held	3	3	—	1	2	4	1	3	7	10	1	15	6	9	8
European Championships	C2 team	Not held	—	Not held	7	Not held	2	1	—	6	3	6	5	3	6	4	1	1	1	4	4

=== World Cup individual podiums ===
	1st place, gold medalist(s)	2nd place, silver medalist(s)	3rd place, bronze medalist(s)	Total
C2	9	5	7	21

Season	Date	Venue	Position	Event
2003	11 May 2003	Penrith	3rd	C2
2005	26 June 2005	Tacen	3rd	C2^{1}
2005	10 July 2005	Athens	3rd	C2
2005	24 July 2005	La Seu d'Urgell	3rd	C2
2007	14 July 2007	Augsburg	3rd	C2
2008	29 June 2008	Tacen	2nd	C2
2008	5 July 2008	Augsburg	2nd	C2
2009	28 June 2009	Pau	1st	C2
2009	5 July 2009	Bratislava	2nd	C2
2010	21 February 2010	Penrith	1st	C2^{2}
2010	27 June 2010	La Seu d'Urgell	1st	C2
2011	26 June 2011	Tacen	3rd	C2
2012	17 June 2012	Pau	2nd	C2
2012	24 June 2012	La Seu d'Urgell	2nd	C2
2014	8 June 2014	Lee Valley	3rd	C2
2014	15 June 2014	Tacen	1st	C2
2014	22 June 2014	Prague	1st	C2
2014	3 August 2014	La Seu d'Urgell	1st	C2
2016	4 September 2016	Prague	1st	C2
2016	11 September 2016	Tacen	1st	C2
2017	2 September 2017	Ivrea	1st	C2

^{1} European Championship counting for World Cup points
^{2} Oceania Canoe Slalom Open counting for World Cup points
