= Eilidh Gibson =

British slalom canoeist (born 1995)

Personal information
- Nationality: British / Scottish
- Born: 4 October 1995 (age 30) Kinross, Scotland
Medal record
Women's canoe slalom
Representing Great Britain
World Championships
Gold medal – first place	2017 Pau	C1 team
European Championships
Gold medal – first place	2016 Liptovský Mikuláš	C1 team
Gold medal – first place	2017 Tacen	C1 team
Bronze medal – third place	2015 Markkleeberg	C1 team
U23 World Championships
Gold medal – first place	2016 Kraków	C1 team
Gold medal – first place	2017 Bratislava	C1 team
Bronze medal – third place	2012 Wausau	C1 team
U23 European Championships
Gold medal – first place	2014 Skopje	C1 team
Gold medal – first place	2015 Kraków	C1 team
Gold medal – first place	2016 Solkan	C1 team
Bronze medal – third place	2012 Solkan	C1 team
Junior World Championships
Bronze medal – third place	2013 Liptovský Mikuláš	C1 team

Eilidh Gibson (born 4 October 1995 in Kinross) is a Scottish slalom canoeist who has competed at the international level since 2012.

Gibson's best individual results include a silver in race 1 of the 2014 Canoe Slalom World Cup at Lee Valley White Water Centre, 4th place at the 2017 ICF Canoe Slalom World Championships and 4th place at the 2016 European Canoe Slalom Championships.

She won a gold medal in the C1 team event at the 2017 ICF Canoe Slalom World Championships in Pau. She also won two golds and a bronze in the same event at the European Championships.

Gibson attended Strathallan School and studied biomedical sciences at the University of Edinburgh.

== World Cup individual podiums ==
Season	Date	Venue	Position	Event
2014	7 Jun 2014	Lee Valley	2nd	C1
