= Matthew Lister (canoeist) =

British slalom canoeist

Medal record

Men's canoe slalom

Representing Great Britain

World Championships
| Bronze medal – third place | 2011 Bratislava | C2 team |
| Bronze medal – third place | 2013 Prague | C2 team |

U23 World Championships
| Silver medal – second place | 2012 Wausau | C2 team |

U23 European Championships
| Silver medal – second place | 2012 Solkan | C2 |
| Bronze medal – third place | 2011 Banja Luka | C2 team |
| Bronze medal – third place | 2012 Solkan | C2 team |

Junior European Championships
| Bronze medal – third place | 2009 Liptovský Mikuláš | C2 |

Matthew Lister (born 1992) is a British slalom canoeist who competed at the international level from 2008 to 2015, predominantly in the C2 class with Rhys Davies.

He won two bronze medals in the C2 team event at the ICF Canoe Slalom World Championships, earning them in 2011 and 2013.

Lister came out as gay in 2012. In 2016, he announced his retirement from competitive sport. He currently writes a fitness column for Attitude magazine, and occasionally works as a model, including advertising campaigns in 2017 for Rowse Honey and Moss Brothers suits. In October 2019, he appeared in RuPaul's Drag Race UK as a member of the "Brit Crew". He is also an LGBT ambassador for the British Athletes Commission.
