= Eva Ornstová =

Czech canoeist

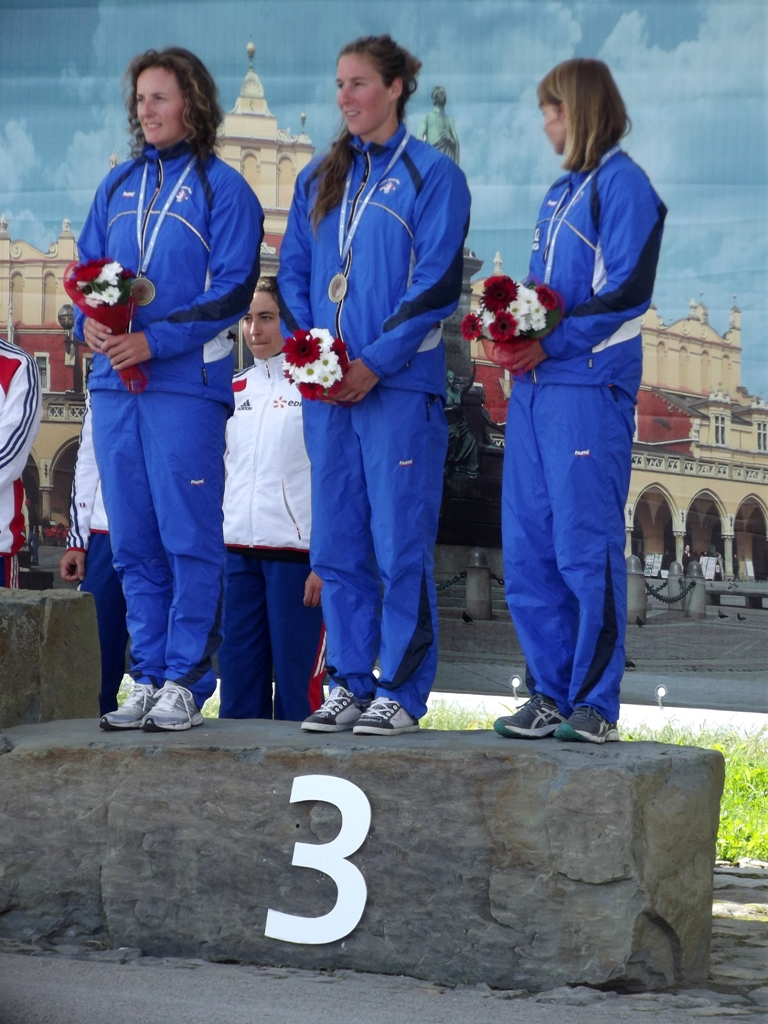
- Eva Ornstová, Kateřina Kudějová and Štěpánka Hilgertová at the 2013 European Canoe Slalom Championships

Medal record

Women's canoe slalom

Representing Czech Republic

World Championships
Gold medal – first place	2013 Prague	K1 team

European Championships
Bronze medal – third place	2013 Krakow	K1 team

U23 World Championships
Gold medal – first place	2012 Wausau	K1 team

U23 European Championships
Gold medal – first place	2011 Banja Luka	K1 team
Bronze medal – third place	2009 Liptovský Mikuláš	K1 team
Bronze medal – third place	2012 Solkan	K1 team

Junior European Championships
Gold medal – first place	2007 Kraków	K1 team

Eva Ornstová is a Czech slalom canoeist who competed at the international level from 2005 to 2015.

She won a gold medal in the K1 team event at the 2013 ICF Canoe Slalom World Championships in Prague. She also won a bronze medal in the same event at the 2013 European Canoe Slalom Championships in Augsburg.
