= Martin Thomas (canoeist) =

French slalom canoeist

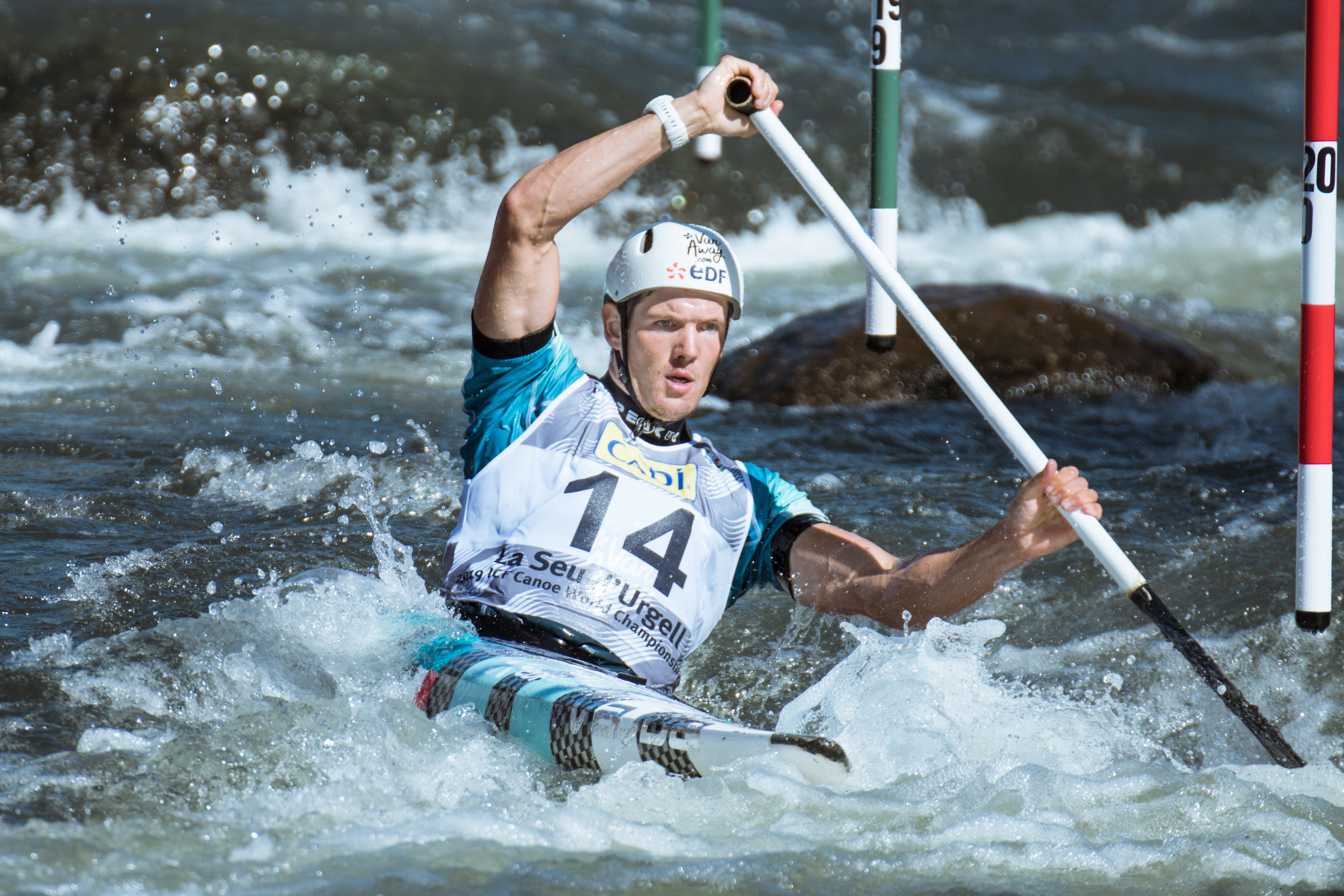

Personal information
- Nationality: French
- Born: 15 September 1989 (age 37) Pau, Pyrénées-Atlantiques

Sport
- Country: France
- Sport: Canoe slalom
- Event: C1
- Club: Jarnac Sports Canoë Kayak
Medal record
Men's canoe slalom
Representing France
World Championships
Gold medal – first place	2021 Bratislava	C1 team
Bronze medal – third place	2017 Pau	C1 team
European Championships
Silver medal – second place	2019 Pau	C1
Silver medal – second place	2019 Pau	C1 team
U23 World Championships
Silver medal – second place	2012 Wausau	C1 team
U23 European Championships
Bronze medal – third place	2012 Solkan	C1 team

Martin Thomas (born 15 September 1989) is a French slalom canoeist who has competed at the international level since 2010.

He won two medals in the C1 team event at the ICF Canoe Slalom World Championships with a gold in 2021 and a silver in 2017. He also won two silver medals at the 2019 European Canoe Slalom Championships in Pau (C1 and C1 team events).

Thomas competed in the C1 event at the 2020 Summer Olympics, finishing in 5th place.

== World Cup individual podiums ==
Season	Date	Venue	Position	Event
2017	10 Sep 2017	La Seu d'Urgell	3rd	C1
