= Rhys Davies (canoeist) =

British slalom canoeist

Medal record

Men's canoe slalom

Representing Great Britain

World Championships
Bronze medal – third place	2011 Bratislava	C2 team
Bronze medal – third place	2013 Prague	C2 team

U23 World Championships
Silver medal – second place	2012 Wausau	C2 team

U23 European Championships
Silver medal – second place	2012 Solkan	C2
Bronze medal – third place	2011 Banja Luka	C2 team
Bronze medal – third place	2012 Solkan	C2 team

Junior European Championships
Bronze medal – third place	2009 Liptovský Mikuláš	C2

Rhys Davies is a British slalom canoeist who competed at the international level from 2008 to 2015 in the C2 class with Matthew Lister.

He won two bronze medals in the C2 team event at the ICF Canoe Slalom World Championships, earning them in 2011 and 2013.
