= Greg Pitt =

British slalom canoeist (born 1989)

Medal record

Men's canoe slalom

Representing Great Britain

World Championships
Bronze medal – third place	2013 Prague	C2 team
Bronze medal – third place	2015 London	C2 team

European Championships
Gold medal – first place	2012 Augsburg	C2 team

U23 World Championships
Silver medal – second place	2012 Wausau	C2 team

U23 European Championships
Bronze medal – third place	2011 Banja Luka	C2 team
Bronze medal – third place	2012 Solkan	C2 team

Junior World Championships
Bronze medal – third place	2006 Solkan	C1 team

Junior European Championships
Silver medal – second place	2007 Kraków	C1

Greg Pitt (born 15 July 1989 in Wolverhampton) is a British slalom canoeist who competed at the international level from 2006 to 2015.

He won two bronze medals in the C2 team event at the ICF Canoe Slalom World Championships, earning them in 2013 and 2015. He also won a gold medal in the same event at the 2012 European Canoe Slalom Championships in Augsburg.

His partner in the C2 boat from 2010 to 2015 was Adam Burgess.
