= Jure Lenarčič =

Slovenian slalom canoeist (born 1990)

Personal information
- Born: 4 April 1990 (age 36)
Medal record
Men's canoe slalom
Representing Slovenia
World Championships
Bronze medal – third place	2015 London	C1 team
European Championships
Gold medal – first place	2020 Prague	C1 team
U23 World Championships
Gold medal – first place	2012 Wausau	C1 team
Gold medal – first place	2013 Liptovský Mikuláš	C1 team
U23 European Championships
Gold medal – first place	2009 Liptovský Mikuláš	C1 team
Gold medal – first place	2012 Solkan	C1 team
Silver medal – second place	2010 Markkleeberg	C1 team
Junior World Championships
Gold medal – first place	2008 Roudnice nad Labem	C1 team
Junior European Championships
Silver medal – second place	2007 Kraków	C1 team
Silver medal – second place	2008 Solkan	C1 team

Jure Lenarčič (born 4 April 1990) is a Slovenian slalom canoeist who has competed at the international level since 2006.

He won a bronze medal in the C1 team event at the 2015 ICF Canoe Slalom World Championships in London. He also won a gold medal in the same event at the 2020 European Championships in Prague.
