= Mira Louen =

German canoeist

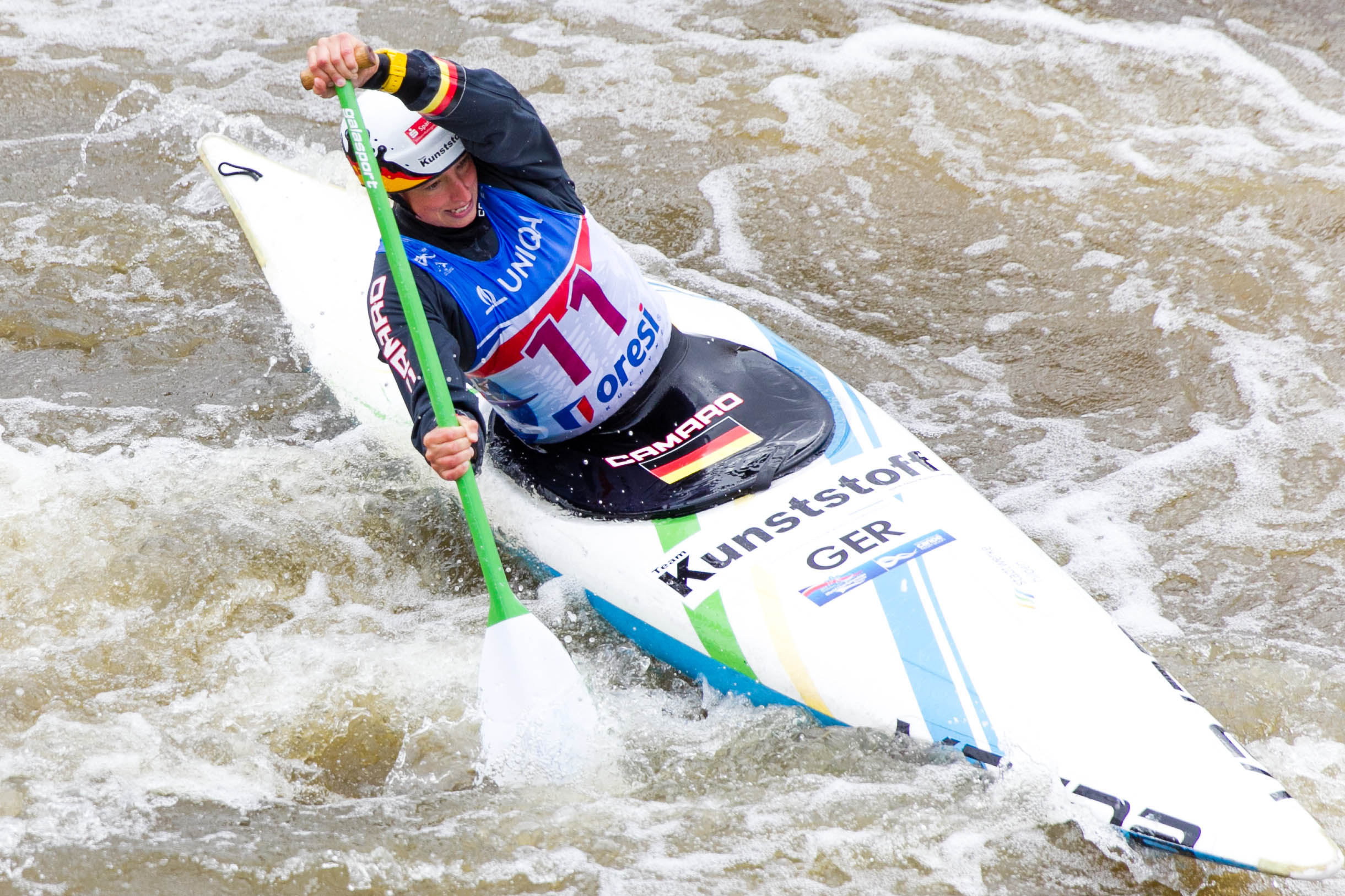
- Louen at Slalom World Championships 2013

Medal record

Women's canoe slalom

Representing Germany

World Championships
Bronze medal – third place	2013 Prague	C1 team

European Championships
Gold medal – first place	2012 Augsburg	C1
Silver medal – second place	2011 La Seu d'Urgell	C1

U23 European Championships
Gold medal – first place	2005 Kraków	K1 team
Gold medal – first place	2006 Nottingham	K1 team

Mira Louen (born 13 October 1985) is a German slalom canoeist who competed at the international level from 2005 to 2013.

She won a bronze medal in the C1 team event at the 2013 ICF Canoe Slalom World Championships in Prague. She also won one gold and one silver medal in the C1 event at the European Canoe Slalom Championships.

She retired after the 2013 season and became the German national coach for the U23-team.
