= 2012 European Junior and U23 Canoe Slalom Championships =

- Location: Solkan, Slovenia

The 2012 European Junior and U23 Canoe Slalom Championships took place in Solkan, Slovenia from 6 to 9 September 2012 under the auspices of the European Canoe Association (ECA). It was the 14th edition of the competition for Juniors (U18) and the 10th edition for the Under 23 category. A total of 19 medal events took place. No medals were awarded for the junior women's C1 team event due to low number of participating countries.

== Medal summary ==
=== Men ===
==== Canoe ====
===== Junior =====
Event	Gold		Silver		Bronze	
C1	Franz-Xaver Strauss (GER)	115.32	Dennis Söter (GER)	118.08	Alexander Ovchinikov (RUS)	121.07
C1 team	Germany; Dennis Söter; Franz-Xaver Strauss; Florian Breuer	134.97	Czech Republic; Marek Cepek; Lukáš Rohan; Jakub Mrůzek	138.59	Slovakia; Marko Gurečka; Martin Mračna; Tomáš Džurný	138.95
C2	Dmitriy Azanov/Egor Gover (RUS)	135.66	Aaron Jüttner/Piet Lennart Wagner (GER)	136.28	Aleksei Popov/Vadim Voinalovich (RUS)	140.41
C2 team	Russia; Dmitriy Azanov/Egor Gover; Aleksei Popov/Vadim Voinalovich; Pavel Kovalkov/Artem Bogdanov	154.35	Slovakia; Juraj Skákala/Matúš Gewissler; Martin Šimičák/Jakub Skubík; Igor Michalovič/Jakub Tomko	165.41	Czech Republic; Lukáš Rohan/Adam Svoboda; Radek Pospíchal/Marek Cepek; Jakub Franek/Vladimír Zátopek	165.58

===== U23 =====
Event	Gold		Silver		Bronze	
C1	Thibaud Vielliard (FRA)	111.09	Ruslan Sayfiev (RUS)	111.84	Roberto Colazingari (ITA)	112.84
C1 team	Slovenia; Anže Berčič; Jure Lenarčič; Blaž Cof	125.83	Czech Republic; Jan Busta; Tomáš Rak; Martin Říha	128.14	France; Martin Thomas; Thibaud Vielliard; Cédric Joly	128.94
C2	Luka Božič/Sašo Taljat (SLO)	118.12	Rhys Davies/Matthew Lister (GBR)	118.73	Dariusz Chlebek/Dominik Węglarz (POL)	120.00
C2 team	Poland; Filip Brzeziński/Andrzej Brzeziński; Michał Wiercioch/Grzegorz Majerczak; Dariusz Chlebek/Dominik Węglarz	138.47	Czech Republic; Ondřej Karlovský/Jakub Jáně; Jonáš Kašpar/Marek Šindler; Jaroslav Strnad/Martin Říha	148.00	Great Britain; Adam Burgess/Greg Pitt; Thomas Quinn/George Tatchell; Rhys Davies/Matthew Lister	148.34

==== Kayak ====
===== Junior =====
Event	Gold		Silver		Bronze	
K1	Stefan Hengst (GER)	105.33	Bastien Damiens (FRA)	105.83	Andrej Málek (SVK)	106.65
K1 team	Czech Republic; Petr Binčík; Ondřej Hošek; Matouš Bahenský	122.65	Germany; Stefan Hengst; Samuel Hegge; Timon Lutz	125.06	Slovakia; Richard Macúš; Miroslav Urban; Andrej Málek	125.38

===== U23 =====
Event	Gold		Silver		Bronze	
K1	Martin Halčin (SVK)	102.20	Simon Brus (SLO)	102.30	Rafał Polaczyk (POL)	103.01
K1 team	France; Vivien Colober; Étienne Daille; Bastien Damiens	116.00	Czech Republic; Jiří Prskavec; Vít Přindiš; Ondřej Tunka	117.12	Slovakia; Martin Halčin; Michal Bárta; Matúš Hujsa	119.42

=== Women ===
==== Canoe ====
===== Junior =====
Event	Gold		Silver		Bronze	
C1	Kimberley Woods (GBR)	133.32	Mallory Franklin (GBR)	135.38	Viktoria Wolffhardt (AUT)	136.09
C1 team (non-medal event)	Czech Republic; Jana Matulková; Anna Koblencová; Barbora Košárková	197.08	-		-	

===== U23 =====
Event	Gold		Silver		Bronze	
C1	Monika Jančová (CZE)	135.20	Viktoriia Dobrotvorska (UKR)	139.24	Lena Stöcklin (GER)	139.36
C1 team	Spain; Núria Vilarrubla; Miren Lazkano; Annebel van der Knijff	168.35	Germany; Lena Stöcklin; Karolin Wagner; Hannah Grünbeck	171.30	Great Britain; Mallory Franklin; Kimberley Woods; Eilidh Gibson	174.00

==== Kayak ====
===== Junior =====
Event	Gold		Silver		Bronze	
K1	Karolína Galušková (CZE)	116.67	Kimberley Woods (GBR)	121.55	Viktoria Wolffhardt (AUT)	122.00
K1 team	Czech Republic; Karolína Galušková; Sabina Foltysová; Barbora Valíková	144.31	Germany; Caroline Trompeter; Anna Faber; Rebecca Plonka	147.26	Poland; Monika Liptak; Edyta Węgrzyn; Kamila Urbanik	148.14

===== U23 =====
Event	Gold		Silver		Bronze	
K1	Eva Terčelj (SLO)	113.27	Kateřina Kudějová (CZE)	114.53	Maria Clara Giai Pron (ITA)	114.86
K1 team	Germany; Ricarda Funk; Stefanie Horn; Lisa Fritsche	137.38	Spain; Marta Martínez; Núria Vilarrubla; Meritxell Rodríguez	138.15	Czech Republic; Kateřina Kudějová; Eva Ornstová; Pavlína Zástěrová	138.84

== Medal table ==
Rank	Nation	Gold	Silver	Bronze	Total
1	Czech Republic (CZE)	4	5	2	11
2	Germany (GER)	4	5	1	10
3	Slovenia (SLO)	3	1	0	4
4	Russia (RUS)	2	1	2	5
5	France (FRA)	2	1	1	4
6	Great Britain (GBR)	1	3	2	6
7	Slovakia (SVK)	1	1	4	6
8	Spain (ESP)	1	1	0	2
9	Poland (POL)	1	0	3	4
10	Ukraine (UKR)	0	1	0	1
11	Austria (AUT)	0	0	2	2
11	Italy (ITA)	0	0	2	2
Totals (12 entries)		19	19	19	57
