= 2012 World Junior and U23 Canoe Slalom Championships =

The 2012 ICF World Junior and U23 Canoe Slalom Championships took place in Wausau, Wisconsin, United States from 11 to 15 July 2012 under the auspices of the International Canoe Federation (ICF). It was the 14th edition of the competition for Juniors (U18) and the inaugural edition for the Under 23 category.

No medals were awarded for the men's junior C2 team event and the women's junior C1 team event due to low number of participating nations.

== Medal summary ==
=== Men ===
==== Canoe ====
===== Junior =====
| Event | Gold | Points | Silver | Points | Bronze | Points |
|---|---|---|---|---|---|---|
| C1 | Cédric Joly (FRA) | 119.12 | Dennis Söter (GER) | 121.48 | Marek Cepek (CZE) | 123.39 |
| C1 team | France; Cédric Joly; Jason Brothier; Jean Freri | 140.98 | Great Britain; Samuel Ibbotson; Thomas Abbott; Andrew Houston | 144.46 | Russia; Alexander Ovchinikov; Yuri Snegirev; Pavel Smirnov | 145.61 |
| C2 | Pavel Kovalkov/Artem Bogdanov (RUS) | 128.62 | Lukáš Rohan/Adam Svoboda (CZE) | 130.34 | Radek Pospíchal/Marek Cepek (CZE) | 132.67 |
| C2 team (non-medal event) | Czech Republic; Lukáš Rohan/Adam Svoboda; Radek Pospíchal/Marek Cepek; Jan Raška/Matěj Šiman | 160.39 | Great Britain; Samuel Ibbotson/Daniel Evans; Michael Brown/Andrew Houston; Thomas Abbott/Richard Booth | 187.24 | - | |

===== U23 =====
| Event | Gold | Points | Silver | Points | Bronze | Points |
|---|---|---|---|---|---|---|
| C1 | Roberto Colazingari (ITA) | 111.68 | Franz Anton (GER) | 114.01 | Anže Berčič (SLO) | 116.19 |
| C1 team | Slovenia; Anže Berčič; Jure Lenarčič; Blaž Cof | 126.49 | France; Martin Thomas; Simon Le Friec; Thibaud Vielliard | 127.37 | Czech Republic; Jan Busta; Tomáš Rak; Martin Říha | 129.85 |
| C2 | Robert Behling/Thomas Becker (GER) | 116.58 | Ondřej Karlovský/Jakub Jáně (CZE) | 119.60 | Michał Wiercioch/Grzegorz Majerczak (POL) | 121.48 |
| C2 team | Czech Republic; Ondřej Karlovský/Jakub Jáně; Jonáš Kašpar/Marek Šindler; Jaroslav Strnad/Martin Říha | 144.53 | Great Britain; Thomas Quinn/George Tatchell; Matthew Lister/Rhys Davies; Adam Burgess/Greg Pitt | 145.62 | Germany; Robert Behling/Thomas Becker; Hans Krüger/Paul Sommer; Aaron Jüttner/Piet Lennart Wagner | 146.50 |

==== Kayak ====
===== Junior =====
| Event | Gold | Points | Silver | Points | Bronze | Points |
|---|---|---|---|---|---|---|
| K1 | Miroslav Urban (SVK) | 109.34 | Tom Scianimanico (FRA) | 110.47 | Jakub Grigar (SVK) | 113.17 |
| K1 team | Slovenia; Martin Srabotnik; Vid Karner; Rok Markočič | 127.20 | Australia; Timothy Anderson; Andrew Eckhardt; Daniel Watkins | 134.47 | Germany; Stefan Hengst; Samuel Hegge; Timon Lutz | 135.02 |

===== U23 =====
| Event | Gold | Points | Silver | Points | Bronze | Points |
|---|---|---|---|---|---|---|
| K1 | Jiří Prskavec (CZE) | 102.42 | Lukas Mayr (ITA) | 105.83 | Richard Powell (USA) | 107.01 |
| K1 team | Italy; Lukas Mayr; Zeno Ivaldi; Giovanni De Gennaro | 117.58 | France; Vivien Colober; Thomas Rosset; Yann Le Govic | 118.44 | Czech Republic; Jiří Prskavec; Vít Přindiš; Ondřej Tunka | 119.62 |

=== Women ===
==== Canoe ====
===== Junior =====
| Event | Gold | Points | Silver | Points | Bronze | Points |
|---|---|---|---|---|---|---|
| C1 | Jessica Fox (AUS) | 129.19 | Mallory Franklin (GBR) | 142.53 | Kimberley Woods (GBR) | 145.19 |
| C1 team (non-medal event) | Australia; Margaret Webster; Erin McGilvray; Georgia Rankin | 256.10 | - | | - | |

===== U23 =====
| Event | Gold | Points | Silver | Points | Bronze | Points |
|---|---|---|---|---|---|---|
| C1 | Rosalyn Lawrence (AUS) | 142.98 | Monika Jančová (CZE) | 144.36 | Alice Spencer (GBR) | 147.64 |
| C1 team | Australia; Jessica Fox; Rosalyn Lawrence; Alison Borrows | 159.73 | Germany; Lena Stöcklin; Karolin Wagner; Birgit Ohmayer | 173.09 | Great Britain; Eilidh Gibson; Mallory Franklin; Kimberley Woods | 193.49 |

==== Kayak ====
===== Junior =====
| Event | Gold | Points | Silver | Points | Bronze | Points |
|---|---|---|---|---|---|---|
| K1 | Jessica Fox (AUS) | 120.23 | Karolína Galušková (CZE) | 121.99 | Viktoria Wolffhardt (AUT) | 128.64 |
| K1 team | Great Britain; Kimberley Woods; Mallory Franklin; Alice Haining | 146.69 | Germany; Caroline Trompeter; Rebecca Plonka; Anna Faber | 154.62 | Czech Republic; Karolína Galušková; Barbora Valíková; Sabina Foltysová | 157.91 |

===== U23 =====
| Event | Gold | Points | Silver | Points | Bronze | Points |
|---|---|---|---|---|---|---|
| K1 | Kateřina Kudějová (CZE) | 117.11 | Cindy Pöschel (GER) | 119.24 | Nouria Newman (FRA) | 120.73 |
| K1 team | Czech Republic; Kateřina Kudějová; Eva Ornstová; Pavlína Zástěrová | 139.50 | Great Britain; Natalie Wilson; Bethan Latham; Hannah Burgess | 148.56 | France; Lucie Baudu; Estelle Mangin; Nouria Newman | 149.30 |

== Medal table ==
| Rank | Nation | Gold | Silver | Bronze | Total |
|---|---|---|---|---|---|
| 1 | Czech Republic (CZE) | 4 | 4 | 5 | 13 |
| 2 | Australia (AUS) | 4 | 1 | 0 | 5 |
| 3 | France (FRA) | 2 | 3 | 2 | 7 |
| 4 | Italy (ITA) | 2 | 1 | 0 | 3 |
| 5 | Slovenia (SLO) | 2 | 0 | 1 | 3 |
| 6 | Germany (GER) | 1 | 5 | 2 | 8 |
| 7 | Great Britain (GBR) | 1 | 4 | 3 | 8 |
| 8 | Russia (RUS) | 1 | 0 | 1 | 2 |
| 8 | Slovakia (SVK) | 1 | 0 | 1 | 2 |
| 10 | Austria (AUT) | 0 | 0 | 1 | 1 |
| 10 | Poland (POL) | 0 | 0 | 1 | 1 |
| 10 | United States (USA) | 0 | 0 | 1 | 1 |
| Totals (12 entries) | | 18 | 18 | 18 | 54 |
