= 2016 European Canoe Slalom Championships =

The 2016 European Canoe Slalom Championships took place in Liptovský Mikuláš, Slovakia under the auspices of the European Canoe Association (ECA). It was the 17th edition of the competition and Liptovský Mikuláš hosted the event for the second time after previously hosting it in 2007. The events took place at the Ondrej Cibak Whitewater Slalom Course from 12 to 15 May 2016.

This event also served as the European qualification for the 2016 Summer Olympics in Rio de Janeiro.

== Medal summary ==
=== Men's results ===
==== Canoe ====
Event	Gold	Points	Silver	Points	Bronze	Points
C1	Alexander Slafkovský (SVK)	99.87	Michal Martikán (SVK)	101.66	Ander Elosegi (ESP)	102.56
C1 team	Slovakia; Michal Martikán; Alexander Slafkovský; Matej Beňuš	118.26	Poland; Grzegorz Hedwig; Przemysław Plewa; Igor Sztuba	125.70	Great Britain; David Florence; Ryan Westley; Adam Burgess	128.67
C2	Slovakia; Tomáš Kučera; Ján Bátik	112.70	Slovenia; Luka Božič; Sašo Taljat	113.16	Germany; David Schröder; Nico Bettge	113.23
C2 team	Slovakia; Pavol Hochschorner & Peter Hochschorner; Ladislav Škantár & Peter Škantár; Tomáš Kučera & Ján Bátik	139.94	Poland; Piotr Szczepański & Marcin Pochwała; Filip Brzeziński & Andrzej Brzeziński; Michał Wiercioch & Grzegorz Majerczak	140.93	Germany; Franz Anton & Jan Benzien; David Schröder & Nico Bettge; Kai Müller & Kevin Müller	142.39

==== Kayak ====
Event	Gold	Points	Silver	Points	Bronze	Points
K1	Jiří Prskavec (CZE)	91.44	Vavřinec Hradilek (CZE)	91.45	Hannes Aigner (GER)	92.91
K1 team	Czech Republic; Jiří Prskavec; Vavřinec Hradilek; Vít Přindiš	108.00	France; Boris Neveu; Sébastien Combot; Étienne Daille	109.07	Spain; Samuel Hernanz; Joan Crespo; Unai Nabaskues	112.71

=== Women's results ===
==== Canoe ====
Event	Gold	Points	Silver	Points	Bronze	Points
C1	Núria Vilarrubla (ESP)	124.91	Kateřina Hošková (CZE)	125.57	Mallory Franklin (GBR)	126.27
C1 team	Great Britain; Kimberley Woods; Mallory Franklin; Eilidh Gibson	185.03	Czech Republic; Kateřina Hošková; Monika Jančová; Martina Satková	226.09	Germany; Andrea Herzog; Lena Stöcklin; Birgit Ohmayer	245.63

==== Kayak ====
Event	Gold	Points	Silver	Points	Bronze	Points
K1	Melanie Pfeifer (GER)	108.86	Urša Kragelj (SLO)	109.44	Jana Dukátová (SVK)	111.13
K1 team	Great Britain; Fiona Pennie; Kimberley Woods; Lizzie Neave	124.28	Germany; Melanie Pfeifer; Jasmin Schornberg; Lisa Fritsche	128.56	Slovakia; Elena Kaliská; Jana Dukátová; Kristína Nevařilová	133.43

== Medal table ==
Rank	Nation	Gold	Silver	Bronze	Total
1	Slovakia (SVK)	4	1	2	7
2	Czech Republic (CZE)	2	3	0	5
3	Great Britain (GBR)	2	0	2	4
4	Germany (GER)	1	1	4	6
5	Spain (ESP)	1	0	2	3
6	Poland (POL)	0	2	0	2
6	Slovenia (SLO)	0	2	0	2
8	France (FRA)	0	1	0	1
Totals (8 entries)		10	10	10	30
