= 2011 European Canoe Slalom Championships =

Canoe championships

The 2011 European Canoe Slalom Championships took place in La Seu d'Urgell, Catalonia, Spain between June 9 and June 12, 2011 under the auspices of the European Canoe Association (ECA). It was the 12th edition. The races were held in Parc Olímpic del Segre which is known for hosting the canoe slalom events of the 1992 Summer Olympics.

== Medal summary ==
=== Men's results ===
==== Canoe ====
Event	Gold	Points	Silver	Points	Bronze	Points
C1	Tony Estanguet (FRA)	99.48	Alexander Slafkovský (SVK)	100.00	Denis Gargaud Chanut (FRA)	100.14
C1 team	France; Tony Estanguet; Denis Gargaud Chanut; Nicolas Peschier	110.28	Germany; Nico Bettge; Jan Benzien; Sideris Tasiadis	112.30	Czech Republic; Stanislav Ježek; Vítězslav Gebas; Tomáš Indruch	113.79
C2	Slovakia; Pavol Hochschorner; Peter Hochschorner	107.05	France; Pierre Labarelle; Nicolas Peschier	107.65	Slovakia; Ladislav Škantár; Peter Škantár	108.61
C2 team	Czech Republic; Lukáš Přinda & Jan Havlíček; Tomáš Koplík & Jakub Vrzáň; Václav Hradilek & Štěpán Sehnal	123.20	Germany; Marcus Becker & Stefan Henze; David Schröder & Frank Henze; Kai Müller & Kevin Müller	124.05	Slovakia; Pavol Hochschorner & Peter Hochschorner; Tomáš Kučera & Ján Bátik; Ladislav Škantár & Peter Škantár	124.24

==== Kayak ====
Event	Gold	Points	Silver	Points	Bronze	Points
K1	Daniele Molmenti (ITA)	93.93	Samuel Hernanz (ESP)	94.83	Jiří Prskavec (CZE)	95.41
K1 team	Slovenia; Peter Kauzer; Jure Meglič; Simon Brus	106.15	Poland; Mateusz Polaczyk; Grzegorz Polaczyk; Dariusz Popiela	106.53	France; Fabien Lefèvre; Boris Neveu; Vivien Colober	106.79

=== Women's results ===
==== Canoe ====
Event	Gold	Points	Silver	Points	Bronze	Points
C1	Caroline Loir (FRA)	127.65	Mira Louen (GER)	127.98	Lena Stöcklin (GER)	132.67

==== Kayak ====
Event	Gold	Points	Silver	Points	Bronze	Points
K1	Claudia Bär (GER)	105.26	Jana Dukátová (SVK)	105.43	Lizzie Neave (GBR)	106.76
K1 team	Czech Republic; Kateřina Kudějová; Štěpánka Hilgertová; Irena Pavelková	122.05	Austria; Corinna Kuhnle; Violetta Oblinger-Peters; Viktoria Wolffhardt	122.87	Slovakia; Jana Dukátová; Elena Kaliská; Dana Mann	125.43

== Medal table ==
Rank	Nation	Gold	Silver	Bronze	Total
1	France (FRA)	3	1	2	6
2	Czech Republic (CZE)	2	0	2	4
3	Germany (GER)	1	3	1	5
4	Slovakia (SVK)	1	2	3	6
5	Italy (ITA)	1	0	0	1
5	Slovenia (SLO)	1	0	0	1
7	Austria (AUT)	0	1	0	1
7	Poland (POL)	0	1	0	1
7	Spain (ESP)	0	1	0	1
10	Great Britain (GBR)	0	0	1	1
Totals (10 entries)		9	9	9	27
