= Lena Stöcklin =

German canoeist

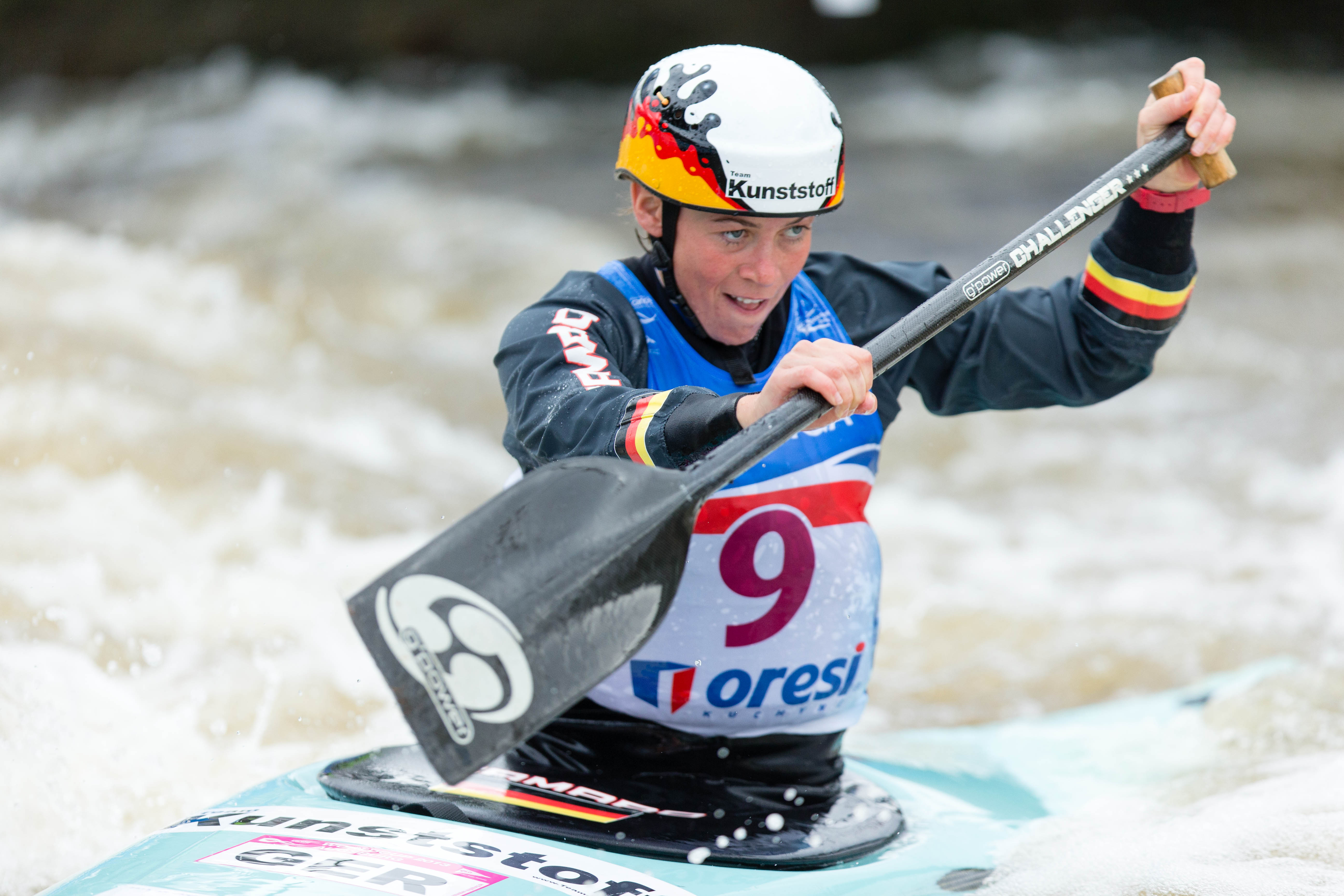
- Stöcklin at the 2013 World Championships

Medal record

Women's canoe slalom

Representing Germany

World Championships
| Bronze medal – third place | 2013 Prague | C1 team |

European Championships
| Silver medal – second place | 2017 Tacen | C1 team |
| Bronze medal – third place | 2011 La Seu d'Urgell | C1 |
| Bronze medal – third place | 2016 Liptovský Mikuláš | C1 team |

U23 World Championships
| Silver medal – second place | 2012 Wausau | C1 team |

U23 European Championships
| Silver medal – second place | 2012 Solkan | C1 team |
| Bronze medal – third place | 2012 Solkan | C1 |

Lena Stöcklin (born 22 May 1990) is a German slalom canoeist who has competed at the international level since 2011.

She won a bronze medal in the C1 team event at the 2013 ICF Canoe Slalom World Championships in Prague. She also won one silver and two bronze medals at the European Championships.

== World Cup individual podiums ==
| Season | Date | Venue | Position | Event |
|---|---|---|---|---|
| 2012 | 25 August 2012 | Prague | 3rd | C1 |
| 2017 | 24 June 2017 | Augsburg | 3rd | C1 |
