= 2013 ICF Canoe Slalom World Championships =

Sports competition

The 2013 ICF Canoe Slalom World Championships took place from 11 to 15 September 2013 in Prague, Czech Republic under the auspices of International Canoe Federation (ICF) at the Prague-Troja Canoeing Centre. It was the 35th edition. Prague was the host city for the second time after hosting the event previously in 2006.

The city was awarded the event at an ICF Board of Directors meeting in Budapest, Hungary on 10 April 2010.

== Medal summary ==
=== Medal table ===
| Rank | Nation | Gold | Silver | Bronze | Total |
|---|---|---|---|---|---|
| 1 | Czech Republic | 3 | 3 | 0 | 6 |
| 2 | Great Britain | 2 | 1 | 1 | 4 |
| 3 | Australia | 2 | 0 | 0 | 2 |
| 4 | Slovakia | 1 | 2 | 1 | 4 |
| 5 | France | 1 | 1 | 3 | 5 |
| 6 | Italy | 1 | 0 | 0 | 1 |
| 7 | Germany | 0 | 2 | 2 | 4 |
| 8 | Poland | 0 | 1 | 1 | 2 |
| 9 | Slovenia | 0 | 0 | 2 | 2 |
| Totals (9 entries) | | 10 | 10 | 10 | 30 |

=== Men ===
==== Canoe ====
| Event | Gold | Points | Silver | Points | Bronze | Points |
|---|---|---|---|---|---|---|
| C1 | David Florence (GBR) | 102.53 | Alexander Slafkovský (SVK) | 103.36 | Benjamin Savšek (SLO) | 105.79 |
| C1 team | Slovakia; Michal Martikán; Alexander Slafkovský; Matej Beňuš | 118.98 | Germany; Sideris Tasiadis; Jan Benzien; Franz Anton | 119.77 | France; Denis Gargaud Chanut; Jonathan Marc; Nicolas Peschier | 122.84 |
| C2 | Great Britain; David Florence; Richard Hounslow | 114.10 | Czech Republic; Jaroslav Volf; Ondřej Štěpánek | 114.14 | Slovakia; Ladislav Škantár; Peter Škantár | 115.63 |
| C2 team | Czech Republic; Ondřej Karlovský & Jakub Jáně; Jonáš Kašpar & Marek Šindler; Jaroslav Volf & Ondřej Štěpánek | 130.54 | Slovakia; Pavol Hochschorner & Peter Hochschorner; Ladislav Škantár & Peter Škantár; Tomáš Kučera & Ján Bátik | 136.89 | Great Britain; David Florence & Richard Hounslow; Rhys Davies & Matthew Lister; Adam Burgess & Greg Pitt | 141.59 |

==== Kayak ====
| Event | Gold | Points | Silver | Points | Bronze | Points |
|---|---|---|---|---|---|---|
| K1 | Vavřinec Hradilek (CZE) | 94.52 | Jiří Prskavec (CZE) | 95.90 | Mateusz Polaczyk (POL) | 95.98 |
| K1 team | Italy; Daniele Molmenti; Andrea Romeo; Giovanni De Gennaro | 109.60 | Poland; Grzegorz Polaczyk; Mateusz Polaczyk; Dariusz Popiela | 111.10 | France; Boris Neveu; Étienne Daille; Mathieu Biazizzo | 112.12 |

=== Women ===
==== Canoe ====
| Event | Gold | Points | Silver | Points | Bronze | Points |
|---|---|---|---|---|---|---|
| C1 | Jessica Fox (AUS) | 126.09 | Mallory Franklin (GBR) | 139.08 | Caroline Loir (FRA) | 139.75 |
| C1 team | Australia; Jessica Fox; Rosalyn Lawrence; Alison Borrows | 164.85 | Czech Republic; Kateřina Hošková; Monika Jančová; Anna Koblencová | 166.34 | Germany; Mira Louen; Lena Stöcklin; Karolin Wagner | 174.75 |

==== Kayak ====
| Event | Gold | Points | Silver | Points | Bronze | Points |
|---|---|---|---|---|---|---|
| K1 | Émilie Fer (FRA) | 115.74 | Nouria Newman (FRA) | 117.94 | Jasmin Schornberg (GER) | 118.99 |
| K1 team | Czech Republic; Štěpánka Hilgertová; Kateřina Kudějová; Eva Ornstová | 127.55 | Germany; Jasmin Schornberg; Claudia Bär; Cindy Pöschel | 138.72 | Slovenia; Urša Kragelj; Eva Terčelj; Ajda Novak | 138.94 |
