= 2019 European Canoe Slalom Championships =

The 2019 European Canoe Slalom Championships took place in Pau, France under the auspices of the European Canoe Association (ECA). It was the 20th edition of the competition and Pau hosted the event for the first time. The events took place at the Pau-Pyrénées Whitewater Stadium from 29 May to 2 June 2019.

== Medal summary ==
=== Men ===
==== Canoe ====
Event	Gold		Silver		Bronze	
C1	Benjamin Savšek; Slovenia	98.59	Martin Thomas; France	99.38	Sideris Tasiadis; Germany	100.77
C1 team	Slovenia; Benjamin Savšek; Luka Božič; Anže Berčič	102.25	France; Denis Gargaud Chanut; Martin Thomas; Cédric Joly	102.41	Russia; Dmitrii Khramtsov; Kirill Setkin; Pavel Kotov	104.61

==== Kayak ====
Event	Gold		Silver		Bronze	
K1	Vít Přindiš; Czech Republic	93.67	Dariusz Popiela; Poland	94.44	Quentin Burgi; France	94.91
K1 team	Czech Republic; Jiří Prskavec; Vít Přindiš; Vavřinec Hradilek	95.72	Slovenia; Peter Kauzer; Niko Testen; Martin Srabotnik	99.91	Germany; Hannes Aigner; Sebastian Schubert; Stefan Hengst	100.09

=== Women ===
==== Canoe ====
Event	Gold		Silver		Bronze	
C1	Mallory Franklin; Great Britain	109.50	Núria Vilarrubla; Spain	120.15	Kimberley Woods; Great Britain	125.39
C1 team	Great Britain; Mallory Franklin; Kimberley Woods; Sophie Ogilvie	127.14	Germany; Elena Apel; Andrea Herzog; Jasmin Schornberg	127.43	Czech Republic; Tereza Fišerová; Eva Říhová; Kateřina Havlíčková	131.19

==== Kayak ====
Event	Gold		Silver		Bronze	
K1	Amálie Hilgertová; Czech Republic	104.95	Mallory Franklin; Great Britain	105.14	Jasmin Schornberg; Germany	107.52
K1 team	France; Marie-Zélia Lafont; Lucie Baudu; Camille Prigent	114.08	Germany; Ricarda Funk; Jasmin Schornberg; Elena Apel	115.07	Austria; Corinna Kuhnle; Viktoria Wolffhardt; Nina Weratschnig	120.25

== Medals Table ==
Rank	Nation	Gold	Silver	Bronze	Total
1	Czech Republic (CZE)	3	0	1	4
2	Great Britain (GBR)	2	1	1	4
3	Slovenia (SLO)	2	1	0	3
4	France (FRA)	1	2	1	4
5	Germany (GER)	0	2	3	5
6	Poland (POL)	0	1	0	1
6	Spain (ESP)	0	1	0	1
8	Austria (AUT)	0	0	1	1
8	Russia (RUS)	0	0	1	1
Totals (9 entries)		8	8	8	24
