= 2012 European Canoe Slalom Championships =

The 2012 European Canoe Slalom Championships took place in Augsburg, Germany between May 9 and 13, 2012 under the auspices of the European Canoe Association (ECA). It was the 13th edition and Augsburg hosted this event for the second time after its inaugural edition in 1996. The races were held on the Eiskanal which also hosted the 1972 Summer Olympics when canoe slalom made its first appearance at the Olympics.

This event also served as the European qualification for the 2012 Summer Olympics in London.

The women's C1 team event had its first running at the European Championships, but did not count as a medal event due to insufficient number of participating countries. An event must have at least 5 nations taking part in order to count as a medal event.

== Medal summary ==
=== Men's results ===
==== Canoe ====
Event	Gold	Points	Silver	Points	Bronze	Points
C1	Sideris Tasiadis (GER)	98.80	Tony Estanguet (FRA)	100.10	Benjamin Savšek (SLO)	100.55
C1 team	Slovakia; Michal Martikán; Matej Beňuš; Alexander Slafkovský	110.47	Germany; Nico Bettge; Jan Benzien; Sideris Tasiadis	111.58	France; Tony Estanguet; Denis Gargaud Chanut; Thibaut Vielliard	115.70
C2	Czech Republic; Jaroslav Volf; Ondřej Štěpánek	106.02	Slovakia; Pavol Hochschorner; Peter Hochschorner	106.49	Germany; Robert Behling; Thomas Becker	107.27
C2 team	Great Britain; David Florence & Richard Hounslow; Tim Baillie & Etienne Stott; Adam Burgess & Greg Pitt	129.38	Czech Republic; Jaroslav Volf & Ondřej Štěpánek; Ondřej Karlovský & Jakub Jáně; Jonáš Kašpar & Marek Šindler	132.81	Germany; David Schröder & Frank Henze; Kai Müller & Kevin Müller; Robert Behling & Thomas Becker	137.38

==== Kayak ====
Event	Gold	Points	Silver	Points	Bronze	Points
K1	Daniele Molmenti (ITA)	93.20	Paul Böckelmann (GER)	95.05	Hannes Aigner (GER)	96.37
K1 team	France; Étienne Daille; Boris Neveu; Bastien Damiens	108.35	Germany; Hannes Aigner; Paul Böckelmann; Sebastian Schubert	109.23	Austria; Helmut Oblinger; Herwig Natmessnig; Andreas Langer	110.29

=== Women's results ===
==== Canoe ====
Event	Gold	Points	Silver	Points	Bronze	Points
C1	Mira Louen (GER)	125.53	Mallory Franklin (GBR)	130.29	Michaela Grimm (GER)	144.09
C1 team (non-medal event)	Germany; Michaela Grimm; Mira Louen; Lena Stöcklin	151.02	France; Caroline Loir; Claire Jacquet; Oriane Rebours	153.95	Great Britain; Mallory Franklin; Kimberley Woods; Alice Spencer	170.09

==== Kayak ====
Event	Gold	Points	Silver	Points	Bronze	Points
K1	Carole Bouzidi (FRA)	106.93	Melanie Pfeifer (GER)	106.94	Fiona Pennie (GBR)	107.02
K1 team	Germany; Cindy Pöschel; Melanie Pfeifer; Jasmin Schornberg	121.80	France; Émilie Fer; Carole Bouzidi; Caroline Loir	123.45	Slovakia; Jana Dukátová; Elena Kaliská; Dana Mann	126.39

== Medal table ==
Rank	Nation	Gold	Silver	Bronze	Total
1	Germany (GER)	3	4	4	11
2	France (FRA)	2	2	1	5
3	Great Britain (GBR)	1	1	1	3
3	Slovakia (SVK)	1	1	1	3
5	Czech Republic (CZE)	1	1	0	2
6	Italy (ITA)	1	0	0	1
7	Austria (AUT)	0	0	1	1
7	Slovenia (SLO)	0	0	1	1
Totals (8 entries)		9	9	9	27
