= European Junior and U23 Canoe Slalom Championships =

Annual international canoeing and kayaking event

- Status: Active
- Genre: Sports Event
- Date: Midyear
- Frequency: Annual
- Inaugurated: 1995 Liptovský Mikuláš / 2002 Bratislava
- Previous event: 2026 Épinal
- Next event: 2027 Tacen
- Organiser: Paddle Europe

The European Junior and U23 Canoe Slalom Championships is an annual international canoeing and kayaking event organized by Paddle Europe, formerly known as the European Canoe Association (ECA). The Junior Championships were first held in 1995 and then every two years until 2003. The Under-23 Championships were first held in 2002 as part of the senior championships that year. Since 2004 the junior and U23 age categories are held annually together as part of the same event. Athletes under the age of 18 are eligible for the junior category.

== Editions ==
# U18	# U23	Year	Host	Events
Biannual
1	-	1995	Liptovský Mikuláš, Slovakia	8 + 0
2	-	1997	Nowy Sącz, Poland	7 + 0
3	-	1999	Solkan, Slovenia	8 + 0
Annual
4	-	2001	Bratislava, Slovakia	8 + 0
-	1	2002	Bratislava, Slovakia	0 + 4
5	-	2003	Hohenlimburg, Germany	8 + 0
6	2	2004	Kraków, Poland	4 + 8
7	3	2005	Kraków, Poland	8 + 8
8	4	2006	(United Kingdom) Nottingham, Great Britain	8 + 7
9	5	2007	Kraków, Poland	7 + 8
10	6	2008	Solkan, Slovenia	8 + 7
11	7	2009	Liptovský Mikuláš, Slovakia	8 + 8
12	8	2010	Markkleeberg, Germany	9 + 8
13	9	2011	Banja Luka, Bosnia and Herzegovina	9 + 9
14	10	2012	Solkan, Slovenia	9 + 10
15	11	2013	Bourg-Saint-Maurice, France	9 + 10
16	12	2014	(North Macedonia) Skopje, Macedonia	10 + 10
17	13	2015	Kraków, Poland	10 + 10
18	14	2016	Solkan, Slovenia	9 + 10
19	15	2017	Hohenlimburg, Germany	8 + 9
20	16	2018	Bratislava, Slovakia	8 + 8
21	17	2019	Liptovský Mikuláš, Slovakia	8 + 8
22	18	2020	Kraków, Poland	8 + 8
23	19	2021	Solkan, Slovenia	10 + 10
24	20	2022	České Budějovice, Czech Republic	10 + 10
25	21	2023	Bratislava, Slovakia	10 + 10
26	22	2024	Kraków, Poland	12 + 12
27	23	2025	Solkan, Slovenia	12 + 12
28	24	2026	Épinal, France	12 + 12
29	25	2027	Tacen, Slovenia	
Total			245 (U18) + 216 (U23)	461

== Medal tables ==
As of the 2026 Championships.

=== Junior ===
Rank	Nation	Gold	Silver	Bronze	Total
1	Czech Republic	62	59	47	168
2	Germany	53	37	43	133
3	France	32	38	34	104
4	Poland	24	22	17	63
5	Slovakia	24	16	25	65
6	Slovenia	10	15	24	49
7	Italy	9	8	7	24
8	Spain	8	12	13	33
9	Russia	8	9	13	30
10	Great Britain	6	23	17	46
11	Austria	6	4	2	12
12	Switzerland	1	1	2	4
13	Andorra	1	0	0	1
13	Netherlands	1	0	0	1
15	Greece	0	1	0	1
15	Ukraine	0	1	0	1
Totals (16 entries)		245	246	244	735

=== Under 23 ===
Rank	Nation	Gold	Silver	Bronze	Total
1	France	49	40	39	128
2	Czech Republic	39	35	34	108
3	Germany	28	34	28	90
4	Poland	23	14	17	54
5	Slovenia	19	12	12	43
6	Slovakia	18	16	12	46
7	Great Britain	12	21	17	50
8	Spain	11	14	13	38
9	Italy	5	15	16	36
10	Russia	4	6	15	25
11	Austria	4	4	7	15
12	Greece	2	0	2	4
13	Croatia	1	1	0	2
14	Netherlands	1	0	0	1
15	Switzerland	0	2	1	3
15	Ukraine	0	2	1	3
17	Andorra	0	0	1	1
17	Belgium	0	0	1	1
Totals (18 entries)		216	216	216	648

=== Junior and Under 23 (Total) ===
Rank	Nation	Gold	Silver	Bronze	Total
1	Czech Republic	101	94	81	276
2	France	81	78	73	232
3	Germany	81	71	71	223
4	Poland	47	36	34	117
5	Slovakia	42	32	37	111
6	Slovenia	29	27	36	92
7	Spain	19	26	26	71
8	Great Britain	18	44	34	96
9	Italy	14	23	23	60
10	Russia	12	15	28	55
11	Austria	10	8	9	27
12	Greece	2	1	2	5
13	Netherlands	2	0	0	2
14	Switzerland	1	3	3	7
15	Croatia	1	1	0	2
16	Andorra	1	0	1	2
17	Ukraine	0	3	1	4
18	Belgium	0	0	1	1
Totals (18 entries)		461	462	460	1,383

Note: One shared silver at the 2022 European Junior and U23 Canoe Slalom Championships.

== List of medalists ==
- List of European Junior Canoe Slalom Championships medalists
- List of European Under 23 Canoe Slalom Championships medalists

== See also ==
- European Canoe Slalom Championships
- ICF World Junior and U23 Canoe Slalom Championships
- ICF Canoe Slalom World Championships
- Canoe Slalom World Cup
- Canoeing and kayaking at the Summer Olympics
- Canoe slalom
