= 2026 ICF Canoe Slalom World Championships – Women's K1 =

Women's kayak at the 2026 ICF Canoe Slalom World Championships
- Venue: RIVERSPORT OKC
- Location: Oklahoma City, United States
- Dates: 21–23 July 2026
- Competitors: 62 from 29 nations

Medalists
gold medal	Jessica Fox	Australia
silver medal	Evy Leibfarth	United States
bronze medal	Kimberley Woods	Great Britain

The women's kayak event at the 2026 ICF Canoe Slalom World Championships took place on 23 July 2026 at the RIVERSPORT OKC in Oklahoma City, with the qualification heats on 21 July 2026.

== Competition format ==
The event uses a three-round format with qualification heats, semifinal and final. The top 30 paddlers from the single qualification run qualify for the semifinal. Paddlers start in the reverse order of their qualification position in the semifinal and complete a single run, with the top 12 advancing to the final. The start list for the final is once again in reverse order of the semifinal results. The athlete with the best time in the single-run final is awarded gold.

A penalty of 2 seconds is awarded for touching a gate and a 50-second penalty is awarded for missing a gate or negotiating it in the opposite direction.

The qualification course had 22 gates including 6 upstream gates (5-7-11-14-17-20). The semifinal and final course also had 22 gates with 6 upstream gates (5-7-11-14-17-22).

== Schedule ==
All times listed are UTC–5.

Date	Time	Round
21 July 2026
21 July 2026	09:06	Heats
23 July 2026
23 July 2026	10:06	Semifinal
23 July 2026	14:06	Final

== Results ==
Penalties are included in the time shown. The fastest time in each round is shown in bold.

Rank	Bib	Canoeist	Nation	Heats			Semifinal			Final		
Rank	Bib	Canoeist	Nation	Time	Pen	Rank	Time	Pen	Rank	Time	Pen	Rank
1st place, gold medalist(s)	2	Jessica Fox	Australia	92.95	4	9	98.19	2	7	**92.06**	0	1
2nd place, silver medalist(s)	6	Evy Leibfarth	United States	91.85	2	6	96.39	2	2	93.37	0	2
3rd place, bronze medalist(s)	3	Kimberley Woods	Great Britain	94.41	0	19	98.87	0	10	94.91	2	3
4	19	Alena Marx	Switzerland	93.37	4	14	97.70	0	4	95.67	0	4
5	1	Ricarda Funk	Germany	**89.38**	0	1	98.56	2	9	95.69	0	5
6	13	Zuzana Paňková	Slovakia	93.37	0	14	99.63	2	11	96.30	0	6
7	8	Maialen Chourraut	Spain	92.34	2	7	98.13	0	6	97.05	0	7
8	23	Amálie Hilgertová	Czech Republic	95.62	0	26	97.97	0	5	97.14	0	8
9	34	Marjorie Delassus	France	93.92	2	17	98.30	2	8	97.87	0	9
10	4	Klaudia Zwolińska	Poland	**89.38**	0	1	97.10	0	3	97.94	0	10
11	33	Li Shiting	China	93.36	0	13	**96.35**	0	1	98.20	2	11
12	5	Camille Prigent	France	90.17	0	4	100.12	2	12	192.01	100	12
13	9	Emma Vuitton	France	94.71	2	21	100.71	4	13	did not advance		
14	17	Laia Sorribes	Spain	96.62	2	28	100.73	2	14	did not advance		
15	15	Mònica Dòria	Andorra	91.02	0	5	101.13	2	15	did not advance		
16	16	Soňa Stanovská	Slovakia	90.10	0	3	101.25	2	16	did not advance		
17	25	Kateřina Beková	Czech Republic	92.91	0	8	101.55	2	17	did not advance		
18	21	Ria Sribar	United States	94.74	0	22	104.03	4	18	did not advance		
19	12	Noemie Fox	Australia	95.59	2	25	104.53	4	19	did not advance		
20	35	Kseniia Krylova	Individual Neutral Athletes	93.86	0	16	105.12	2	20	did not advance		
21	30	Aki Yazawa	Japan	94.42	0	20	106.05	2	21	did not advance		
22	31	Bethan Forrow	Great Britain	95.69	2	27	106.09	6	22	did not advance		
23	36	Hanna Danek	Poland	95.52	0	24	106.42	2	23	did not advance		
24	46	Chang Chu-han	Chinese Taipei	95.44	0	23	123.92	10	24	did not advance		
25	7	Eva Alina Hočevar	Slovenia	96.81	0	29	147.69	50	25	did not advance		
26	18	Emily Apel	Germany	96.86	2	30	148.87	54	26	did not advance		
27	24	Eliška Mintálová	Slovakia	94.35	4	18	151.38	52	27	did not advance		
28	11	Kate Eckhardt	Australia	93.07	0	11	157.24	52	28	did not advance		
29	14	Lena Teunissen	Netherlands	93.11	2	12	168.70	56	29	did not advance		
30	20	Ana Sátila	Brazil	93.00	0	10	DSQ			did not advance		
31	37	Alsu Minazova	Individual Neutral Athletes	97.05	0	31	did not advance					
32	60	Martina Wegman	New Zealand	97.24	2	32	did not advance					
33	29	Annkatrin Plochmann	Germany	97.25	0	33	did not advance					
34	27	Dominika Brzeska	Poland	97.63	0	34	did not advance					
35	22	Viktoriia Us	Ukraine	98.30	0	35	did not advance					
36	41	Chen Lin	China	98.43	0	36	did not advance					
37	47	Mariia Sokolova	Individual Neutral Athletes	98.54	2	37	did not advance					
38	42	Lois Betteridge	Canada	98.91	2	38	did not advance					
39	40	Georgina Cochrane	Ireland	99.48	2	39	did not advance					
40	28	Lea Novak	Slovenia	99.49	2	40	did not advance					
41	48	Kurumi Ito	Japan	99.78	4	41	did not advance					
42	45	Courtney Williams	New Zealand	100.44	0	42	did not advance					
43	44	Léa Baldoni	Canada	101.31	4	43	did not advance					
44	39	Bára Galušková	Czech Republic	103.04	6	44	did not advance					
45	38	Marcella Altman	United States	103.87	6	45	did not advance					
46	26	Leire Goñi	Spain	104.92	2	46	did not advance					
47	50	Mine Onozawa	Japan	105.16	2	47	did not advance					
48	43	Wu Ting-i	Chinese Taipei	105.63	4	48	did not advance					
49	49	Yekaterina Tarantseva	Kazakhstan	108.02	2	49	did not advance					
50	51	Rosie Rex	New Zealand	110.08	0	50	did not advance					
51	55	Anastassiya Ananyeva	Kazakhstan	110.40	0	51	did not advance					
52	53	Xu Linxi	China	110.95	4	52	did not advance					
53	52	Sofía Reinoso	Mexico	113.39	0	53	did not advance					
54	57	Ana Paula Fernandes Castro	Paraguay	120.02	2	54	did not advance					
55	54	Florencia Aguirre González	Chile	126.98	6	55	did not advance					
56	61	Cleo Pitcher Farrell	Ireland	137.37	0	56	did not advance					
57	56	Waris Mills	South Africa	139.32	2	57	did not advance					
58	10	Lois Leaver	Great Britain	143.44	50	58	did not advance					
59	32	Omira Estácia Neta	Brazil	145.61	50	59	did not advance					
60	58	Eliza Tare	Latvia	154.46	6	60	did not advance					
61	59	Alua Mauletkan	Kazakhstan	159.89	10	61	did not advance					
62	62	Sára Szijjártó-Szabó	Hungary	200.75	64	62	did not advance					
