= Canoe slalom at the 2023 European Games – Women's K1 team =

Women's canoe slalom event at the 2023 European Games

Women's kayak team at the 2023 European Games
- Venue: Kraków-Kolna Canoe Slalom Course
- Date: 29 June
- Competitors: 30 from 10 nations
- Teams: 10

Medalists
gold medal	Marjorie Delassus; Camille Prigent; Emma Vuitton	France
silver medal	Tereza Fišerová; Amálie Hilgertová; Antonie Galušková	Czech Republic
bronze medal	Ricarda Funk; Elena Lilik; Emily Apel	Germany

The canoe slalom women's kayak team event at the 2023 European Games took place on 29 June 2023 at the Kraków-Kolna Canoe Slalom Course in Kraków.

== Competition format ==
Team events use a single run format with the team with the fastest time including penalties awarded gold. Teams consist of three paddlers from the same country.

Penalties are accumulated for each athlete, such that a team can incur a total of 150 seconds of penalties on a single gate (if all three miss it) or 6 seconds (if all three touch it). The time begins when the first paddler crosses the start beam and ends when the last one crosses the finish beam. All three paddlers must cross the finish line within 15 seconds of each other or else incur an additional 50-second penalty.

Team events are generally contested on the same gate setup as the qualification heats of the individual events.

== Results ==
Rank	Bib	Country	Athletes	Result		
Rank	Bib	Country	Athletes	Time	Pen	Total
1st place, gold medalist(s)	1	France	Marjorie Delassus; Camille Prigent; Emma Vuitton	104.87	4	108.87
2nd place, silver medalist(s)	4	Czechia	Tereza Fišerová; Amálie Hilgertová; Antonie Galušková	107.75	4	111.75
3rd place, bronze medalist(s)	5	Germany	Ricarda Funk; Elena Lilik; Emily Apel	111.17	2	113.17
4	9	Spain	Laia Sorribes; Maialen Chourraut; Olatz Arregui	112.87	2	114.87
5	3	Poland	Klaudia Zwolińska; Natalia Pacierpnik; Dominika Brzeska	114.01	4	118.01
6	8	Netherlands	Martina Wegman; Lena Teunissen; Claudia Leenders	113.88	6	119.88
7	7	Slovakia	Soňa Stanovská; Eliška Mintálová; Michaela Haššová	113.24	8	121.24
8	2	Great Britain	Kimberley Woods; Mallory Franklin; Phoebe Spicer	113.89	8	121.89
9	6	Slovenia	Eva Terčelj; Ajda Novak; Eva Alina Hočevar	123.66	2	125.66
10	10	Ukraine	Viktoriia Us; Viktoriia Dobrotvorska; Anna Lychko	124.48	10	134.48
