= 2023 ICF Canoe Slalom World Championships – Women's K1 team =

Women's kayak teams at the 2023 ICF Canoe Slalom World Championships
- Venue: Lee Valley White Water Centre
- Location: London, United Kingdom
- Dates: 19 September 2023
- Competitors: 45 from 15 nations
- Teams: 15

Medalists
gold medal	Jessica Fox; Noemie Fox; Kate Eckhardt	Australia
silver medal	Maialen Chourraut; Laia Sorribes; Olatz Arregui	Spain
bronze medal	Mallory Franklin; Kimberley Woods; Phoebe Spicer	Great Britain

The women's kayak team event at the 2023 ICF Canoe Slalom World Championships took place on 19 September 2023 at Lee Valley White Water Centre in London.

== Competition format ==
Team events use a single run format with the team with the fastest time including penalties awarded gold. Teams consist of three paddlers from the same country.

Penalties are accumulated for each athlete, such that a team can incur a total of 150 seconds of penalties on a single gate (if all three miss it) or 6 seconds (if all three touch it). The time begins when the first paddler crosses the start beam and ends when the last one crosses the finish beam. All three paddlers must cross the finish line within 15 seconds of each other or else incur an additional 50-second penalty.

The teams had to navigate a total of 18 gates along the course, including 6 upstream gates (4-7-8-11-14-15).

== Results ==
Rank	Bib	Country	Athletes	Result		
Rank	Bib	Country	Athletes	Time	Pen	Total
1st place, gold medalist(s)	12	Australia	Jessica Fox; Noemie Fox; Kate Eckhardt	108.62	0	108.62
2nd place, silver medalist(s)	6	Spain	Maialen Chourraut; Laia Sorribes; Olatz Arregui	106.91	2	108.91
3rd place, bronze medalist(s)	7	Great Britain	Mallory Franklin; Kimberley Woods; Phoebe Spicer	105.02	4	109.02
4	4	Czech Republic	Tereza Fišerová; Amálie Hilgertová; Antonie Galušková	108.01	2	110.01
5	2	Slovenia	Eva Terčelj; Ajda Novak; Eva Alina Hočevar	110.49	2	112.49
6	11	France	Camille Prigent; Emma Vuitton; Marjorie Delassus	111.07	2	113.07
7	3	Poland	Klaudia Zwolińska; Natalia Pacierpnik; Dominika Brzeska	113.92	2	115.92
8	1	Germany	Ricarda Funk; Elena Lilik; Jasmin Schornberg	112.10	4	116.10
9	9	China	Li Lu; Li Tong; Wan Shunfang	114.69	2	116.69
10	8	United States	Marcella Altman; Evy Leibfarth; Ria Sribar	113.43	6	119.43
11	5	Slovakia	Eliška Mintálová; Soňa Stanovská; Michaela Haššová	114.52	8	122.52
12	13	Canada	Léa Baldoni; Lois Betteridge; Florence Maheu	119.76	4	123.76
13	14	Ukraine	Viktoriia Us; Viktoriia Dobrotvorska; Anna Lychko	124.26	0	124.26
14	15	New Zealand	Luuka Jones; Hannah Thomas; Courtney Williams	119.13	6	125.13
15	10	Japan	Aki Yazawa; Kurumi Ito; Naho Fujii	126.84	2	128.84
