= 2023 Asian Canoe Slalom Championships =

- Host city: Tokyo, Japan
- Dates: 27–29 October 2023
- Main venue: Kasai Canoe Slalom Centre

The 2023 Asian Canoe Slalom Championships were the 12th Asian Canoe Slalom Championships and took place from 27 to 29 October 2023 at Kasai Canoe Slalom Centre, Tokyo, Japan.

The event was also the continental qualification for the 2024 Summer Olympics in Paris.

== Medal summary ==
=== Individual ===
Event	Gold	Silver	Bronze
Men's C-1	Takuya Haneda; Japan	Zhang Peng; China	Alibek Temirgaliev; Uzbekistan
Men's K-1	Yuuki Tanaka; Japan	Yusuke Muto; Japan	Zhu Haoran; China
Women's C-1	Huang Juan; China	Anastassiya Ananyeva; Kazakhstan	Yang Jie; China
Women's K-1	Li Lu; China	Aki Yazawa; Japan	Chang Chu-han; Chinese Taipei

=== Team ===
Event	Gold	Silver	Bronze
Men's C-1	Japan; Takuya Haneda; Shota Sasaki; Shota Saito	Uzbekistan; Alibek Temirgaliev; Anvar Klevleev; Abubakir Bukanov	Kazakhstan; Alexandr Kulikov; Kuanysh Yerengaipov; Adil Amanbayev
Men's K-1	Japan; Kosuke Saito; Yuuki Tanaka; Yusuke Muto	Uzbekistan; Djanibek Temirgaliev; Barkamol Mirzakhamdamov; Shakhobiddin Boltaboev	Kazakhstan; Imangali Mambetov; Vladislav Ryabko; Kuanysh Yerengaipov
Women's K-1	China; Li Lu; Li Tong; Wan Shunfang	Japan; Aki Yazawa; Kurumi Ito; Kurumi Tomisawa	Kazakhstan; Anastassiya Ananyeva; Yekaterina Taransteva; Darya Cheshuina

== Medal table ==
Rank	Nation	Gold	Silver	Bronze	Total
1	Japan	4	3	0	7
2	China	3	1	2	6
3	Uzbekistan	0	2	1	3
4	Kazakhstan	0	1	3	4
5	Chinese Taipei	0	0	1	1
Totals (5 entries)		7	7	7	21
