= Canoeing at the 2026 Asian Games – Women's slalom K-1 =

Women's K-1 at the 2026 Asian Games
- Venue: Yahagigawa Canoe Slalom Course
- Date: 29 September – 1 October 2026
- Competitors: 12 from 8 nations

Medalists
gold medal	Kurumi Ito	Japan
silver medal	Chen Lin	China
bronze medal	Yekaterina Tarantseva	Kazakhstan

The women's slalom K-1 (kayak single) competition at the 2026 Asian Games was held from 29 September to 1 October 2026 at the Yahagigawa Canoe Slalom Course in Toyota, Aichi Prefecture, Japan. Each NOC could enter two athletes but only one of them could advance to the final. Kurumi Ito won the gold medal, Chen Lin took silver and Yekaterina Tarantseva the bronze.

== Schedule ==
All times are Japan Standard Time (UTC+09:00)

Date	Time	Event
Tuesday, 29 September 2026	12:17	Heats
Thursday, 1 October 2026	11:06	Semifinal
Thursday, 1 October 2026	14:00	Final

== Results ==
=== Heats ===
Rank	Athlete	Time	Pen.	Total
1	Chang Chu-han (TPE)	109.58	0	109.58
2	Chen Lin (CHN)	111.20	0	111.20
3	Kurumi Ito (JPN)	110.64	6	116.64
4	Wu Ting-i (TPE)	113.96	4	117.96
5	Xu Linxi (CHN)	120.55	4	124.55
6	Jaruwan Niamthong (THA)	124.89	0	124.89
7	Aki Yazawa (JPN)	122.05	6	128.05
8	Yekaterina Tarantseva (KAZ)	123.52	52	175.52
9	Kadek Sintha (INA)	149.26	58	207.26
10	Atcharaporn Duanglawa (THA)	126.54	108	234.54
11	Shikha Chouhan (IND)	134.87	210	344.87
12	Enkhjargal Tsogt (MGL)			DNF

Progression system: 1 to 12 advanced to the semifinal, the rest were eliminated.

=== Semifinal ===
Rank	Athlete	Time	Pen.	Total
1	Kurumi Ito (JPN)	103.84	0	103.84
2	Chang Chu-han (TPE)	106.23	0	106.23
3	Aki Yazawa (JPN)	106.88	0	106.88
4	Chen Lin (CHN)	107.97	0	107.97
5	Yekaterina Tarantseva (KAZ)	113.38	0	113.38
6	Wu Ting-i (TPE)	109.75	4	113.75
7	Jaruwan Niamthong (THA)	114.74	6	120.74
8	Kadek Sintha (INA)	142.88	10	152.88
9	Xu Linxi (CHN)	117.17	52	169.17
10	Shikha Chouhan (IND)	138.16	108	246.16
11	Atcharaporn Duanglawa (THA)	140.47	108	248.47
12	Enkhjargal Tsogt (MGL)	100.50	1102	1202.50

Progression system: 1 to 8 advanced to the final (limited to one athlete per NOC), the rest were eliminated.

=== Final ===
Rank	Athlete	Time	Pen.	Total
1st place, gold medalist(s)	Kurumi Ito (JPN)	105.60	2	107.60
2nd place, silver medalist(s)	Chen Lin (CHN)	107.70	4	111.70
3rd place, bronze medalist(s)	Yekaterina Tarantseva (KAZ)	112.23	0	112.23
4	Chang Chu-han (TPE)	109.48	4	113.48
5	Kadek Sintha (INA)	147.84	2	149.84
6	Jaruwan Niamthong (THA)	110.67	54	164.67
7	Shikha Chouhan (IND)	139.31	54	193.31
8	Enkhjargal Tsogt (MGL)	64.33	1002	1066.33
