= Canoeing at the 2026 Asian Games – Women's slalom kayak cross =

Women's kayak cross at the 2026 Asian Games
- Venue: Yahagigawa Canoe Slalom Course
- Date: 2 October 2026
- Competitors: 13 from 8 nations

Medalists
gold medal	Chen Lin	China
silver medal	Chang Chu-han	Chinese Taipei
bronze medal	Xu Linxi	China

The women's slalom kayak cross competition at the 2026 Asian Games was held on 2 October 2026 at the Yahagigawa Canoe Slalom Course in Toyota, Aichi Prefecture, Japan. It was the first time the event was held at the Asian Games. Chen Lin won the gold medal, Chang Chu-han took silver and Xu Linxi the bronze.

== Background ==
This was the inaugural appearance of the kayak cross event at the Asian Games.

== Competition format ==
The kayak cross event began with a time trial to determine each canoeist's seeding for the quarterfinals. The top 12 canoeists advanced to the quarterfinals.

The quarterfinals featured four races with three competitors each, from which the top two advanced to the semifinals. The two semifinal races were contested by four canoeists each; the top two in each advanced to the final, while the third and fourth placed canoeists competed in the small final.

== Schedule ==
All times are Japan Standard Time (UTC+09:00)

Date	Time	Event
Friday, 2 October 2026	11:00	Time trial
Friday, 2 October 2026	13:30	Quarterfinals
Friday, 2 October 2026	14:14	Semifinals
Friday, 2 October 2026	14:50	Small final
Friday, 2 October 2026	15:10	Final

== Results ==
=== Time trial ===
Rank	Bib	Athlete	Time	Notes
1	1	Chen Lin (CHN)	77.62	Q
2	3	Aki Yazawa (JPN)	78.22	Q
3	9	Chang Chu-han (TPE)	78.38	Q
4	4	Yekaterina Tarantseva (KAZ)	80.18	Q
5	5	Wu Ting-i (TPE)	80.51	Q
6	10	Jaruwan Niamthong (THA)	82.87	Q
7	6	Anastassiya Ananyeva (KAZ)	83.05	Q
8	12	Rungthip Kumrat (THA)	83.17	Q
9	8	Shikha Chouhan (IND)	83.31	Q
10	7	Kurumi Ito (JPN)	84.59	Q
11	2	Xu Linxi (CHN)	86.46	Q
12	11	Kadek Sintha (INA)	86.47	Q, FLT (S)
13	13	Enkhjargal Tsogt (MGL)	91.58	FLT (1, R, 3, 4, 5, 7)

Progression system: 1 to 12 advanced to the quarterfinals, the rest were eliminated.

=== Quarterfinals ===
Proceed to Semifinals
Eliminated

Quarterfinal 1
Rank	Bib	Athlete
1	1	Chen Lin (CHN)
2	12	Kadek Sintha (INA)
3	8	Rungthip Kumrat (THA)

Quarterfinal 2
Rank	Bib	Athlete
1	4	Yekaterina Tarantseva (KAZ)
2	5	Wu Ting-i (TPE)
3	9	Shikha Chouhan (IND)

Quarterfinal 3
Rank	Bib	Athlete
1	3	Chang Chu-han (TPE)
2	6	Jaruwan Niamthong (THA)
3	10	Kurumi Ito (JPN)

Quarterfinal 4
Rank	Bib	Athlete
1	11	Xu Linxi (CHN)
2	2	Aki Yazawa (JPN)
3	7	Anastassiya Ananyeva (KAZ)

=== Semifinals ===
Proceed to Finals
Proceed to Small Final

Semifinal 1
Rank	Bib	Athlete
1	1	Chen Lin (CHN)
2	4	Yekaterina Tarantseva (KAZ)
3	12	Kadek Sintha (INA)
4	5	Wu Ting-i (TPE)

Semifinal 2
Rank	Bib	Athlete
1	11	Xu Linxi (CHN)
2	3	Chang Chu-han (TPE)
3	6	Jaruwan Niamthong (THA)
4	2	Aki Yazawa (JPN)

=== Finals ===
Final
Rank	Bib	Athlete
1st place, gold medalist(s)	1	Chen Lin (CHN)
2nd place, silver medalist(s)	3	Chang Chu-han (TPE)
3rd place, bronze medalist(s)	11	Xu Linxi (CHN)
4	4	Yekaterina Tarantseva (KAZ)

Small Final
Rank	Bib	Athlete
1	5	Wu Ting-i (TPE)
2	2	Aki Yazawa (JPN)
3	12	Kadek Sintha (INA)
4	6	Jaruwan Niamthong (THA)

=== Final ranking ===
Rank	Bib	Athlete
1st place, gold medalist(s)	1	Chen Lin (CHN)
2nd place, silver medalist(s)	3	Chang Chu-han (TPE)
3rd place, bronze medalist(s)	11	Xu Linxi (CHN)
4	4	Yekaterina Tarantseva (KAZ)
5	5	Wu Ting-i (TPE)
6	2	Aki Yazawa (JPN)
7	12	Kadek Sintha (INA)
8	6	Jaruwan Niamthong (THA)
9	7	Anastassiya Ananyeva (KAZ)
10	8	Rungthip Kumrat (THA)
11	9	Shikha Chouhan (IND)
12	10	Kurumi Ito (JPN)
13	13	Enkhjargal Tsogt (MGL)
