= Canoeing at the 2022 Asian Games – Women's slalom K-1 =

Women's K-1 at the 2022 Asian Games
- Venue: Fuyang Water Sports Centre
- Date: 5–6 October 2023
- Competitors: 8 from 7 nations

Medalists
gold medal	Chang Chu-han	Chinese Taipei
silver medal	Li Lu	China
bronze medal	Yekaterina Tarantseva	Kazakhstan

The women's slalom K-1 (kayak single) competition at the 2022 Asian Games was held from 5 to 6 October 2023. Each NOC could enter two athletes but only one of them could advance to the final.

== Schedule ==
All times are China Standard Time (UTC+08:00)

Date	Time	Event
Thursday, 5 October 2023	10:04	Heats 1st
Thursday, 5 October 2023	15:22	Heats 2nd
Friday, 6 October 2023	09:46	Semifinal
Friday, 6 October 2023	14:31	Final

== Results ==
Legend

- DNF — Did not finish

=== Heats 1st ===
Rank	Athlete	Time	Pen.	Total
1	Li Lu (CHN)	96.64	0	96.64
2	Kurumi Ito (JPN)	100.70	2	102.70
3	Chang Chu-han (TPE)	104.83	4	108.83
4	Yekaterina Taransteva (KAZ)	109.31	0	109.31
5	Roksana Razeghian (IRI)	114.52	0	114.52
6	Jaruwan Niamthong (THA)	112.87	2	114.87
7	Shikha Chouhan (IND)	130.27	62	192.27
—	Praewpran Phonwa (THA)		252	DNF

=== Heats 2nd ===
Rank	Athlete	Time	Pen.	Total
1	Jaruwan Niamthong (THA)	115.58	4	119.58
2	Roksana Razeghian (IRI)	113.77	6	119.77
3	Shikha Chouhan (IND)	145.83	8	153.83
4	Praewpran Phonwa (THA)	129.59	106	235.59

=== Semifinal ===
Rank	Athlete	Time	Pen.	Total
1	Li Lu (CHN)	102.58	4	106.58
2	Chang Chu-han (TPE)	110.93	0	110.93
3	Yekaterina Taransteva (KAZ)	114.76	2	116.76
4	Kurumi Ito (JPN)	123.33	4	127.33
5	Roksana Razeghian (IRI)	129.86	4	133.86
6	Shikha Chouhan (IND)	133.23	52	185.23
7	Jaruwan Niamthong (THA)	144.45	56	200.45
8	Praewpran Phonwa (THA)	165.28	158	323.28

=== Final ===
Rank	Athlete	Time	Pen.	Total
1st place, gold medalist(s)	Chang Chu-han (TPE)	109.51	0	109.51
2nd place, silver medalist(s)	Li Lu (CHN)	108.22	2	110.22
3rd place, bronze medalist(s)	Yekaterina Tarantseva (KAZ)	111.71	4	115.71
4	Roksana Razeghian (IRI)	127.83	4	131.83
5	Jaruwan Niamthong (THA)	125.51	8	133.51
6	Shikha Chouhan (IND)	167.24	60	227.24
—	Kurumi Ito (JPN)		0	DNF
