= Canoeing at the 2023 Pan American Games – Women's kayak cross =

Women's kayak cross at the 2023 Pan American Games
- Venue: Aconcagua River
- Dates: October 27, October 29
- Competitors: 18 from 9 nations

Medalists
Gold medal	Ana Sátila	Brazil
Silver medal	Lois Betteridge	Canada
Bronze medal	Evy Leibfarth	United States

The women's kayak cross competition of the canoeing events at the 2023 Pan American Games was held on October 27 and 29 at the Aconcagua River in Los Andes, Chile.

== Schedule ==
Date	Time	Round
October 27, 2023	09:55	Time Trial
October 27, 2023	11:20	Repechage
October 29, 2023	14:42	Semi-final
October 29, 2023	15:55	Final

== Results ==
The eight best times during the time trial advance to the semifinals, though only one athlete for NOC could advance. The best two times of each of the two semifinals advance to the final, where the medals are determined.

=== Time trial ===
Rank	Name	Nation	Time	Notes
1	Ana Sátila	Brazil	52.65	Q
2	Evy Leibfarth	United States	52.75	Q
3	Lois Betteridge	Canada	54.02	Q
4	Léa Baldoni	Canada	55.51	
5	Omira Estácia Neta	Brazil	56.00	
6	María Luz Cassini	Argentina	56.10	Q
7	Florence Maheu	Canada	56.11	
8	Beatriz Da Motta	Brazil	58.17	
9	Florencia Aguirre	Chile	59.45	Q
10	Sofía Reinoso	Mexico	59.58	Q
11	María Inzunza	Chile	61.93	
12	Emilie Armani	Ecuador	64.56	Q
13	Marcella Altman	United States	65.96	
14	Marianna Torres	Venezuela	68.50	Q
15	Lenny Ramirez	Peru	68.55	
16	Emilia Retamales	Chile	75.15	
17	María Eugenia Ayon	Mexico	100.58	
18	Nadia Riquelme	Argentina	DNF	

=== Semifinals ===
Heat	Rank	Name	Nation	Notes
1	1	Ana Sátila	Brazil	Q
1	2	María Luz Cassini	Argentina	Q
1	3	Florencia Aguirre	Chile	
1	4	Marianna Torres	Venezuela	
2	1	Evy Leibfarth	United States	Q
2	2	Lois Betteridge	Canada	Q
2	3	Sofía Reinoso	Mexico	
2	4	Emilie Armani	Ecuador	

=== Final ===
Rank	Name	Nation	Notes
1st place, gold medalist(s)	Ana Sátila	Brazil	
2nd place, silver medalist(s)	Lois Betteridge	Canada	
3rd place, bronze medalist(s)	Evy Leibfarth	United States	
4	María Luz Cassini	Argentina	
