= Canoeing at the 2024 Summer Olympics – Women's slalom K-1 =

Women's slalom K-1 at the Games of the XXXIII Olympiad
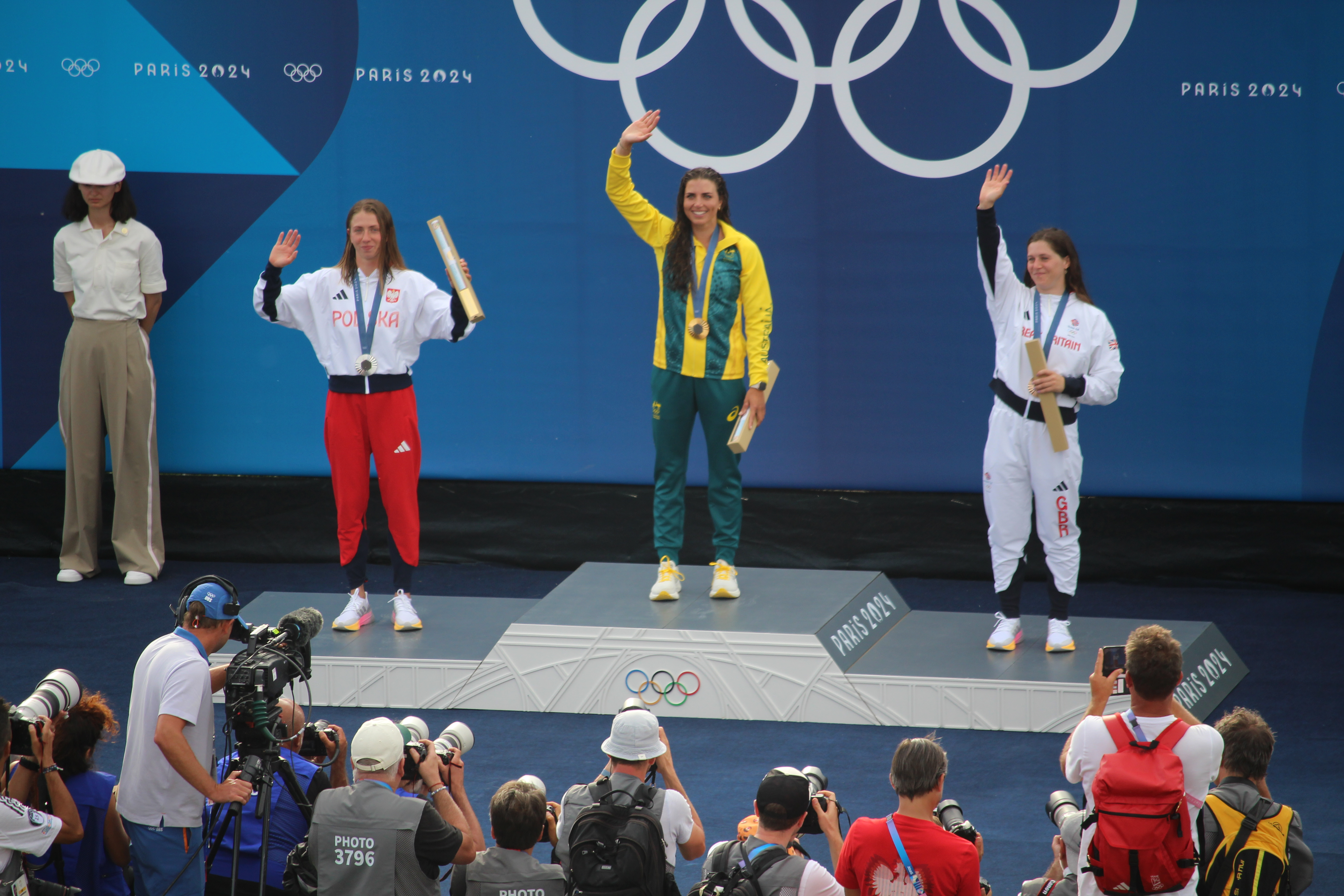
- Zwolińska, Fox, and Woods on the podium
- Venue: National Olympic Nautical Stadium of Île-de-France, Vaires-sur-Marne
- Dates: 27 July 2024 (heats); 28 July 2024 (semifinal & final)

Medalists
1st place, gold medalist(s)		Jessica Fox	Australia
2nd place, silver medalist(s)		Klaudia Zwolińska	Poland
3rd place, bronze medalist(s)		Kimberley Woods	Great Britain

The women's K-1 slalom canoeing event at the 2024 Summer Olympics took place on 27 and 28 July 2024 at the National Olympic Nautical Stadium of Île-de-France in Vaires-sur-Marne. Jessica Fox won the event. She already has several Olympic medals in kayak slalom (K1) – a silver (from 2012) and two bronze (from 2016 and 2021) – and a gold medal in canoe slalom (C1) from the Tokyo 2020 games (postponed to 2021 due to the COVID-19 pandemic). Klaudia Zwolińska won silver and Kimberley Woods bronze, for both of them it was the first Olympic medal.

Ricarda Funk was the defending 2020 Olympic champion, but she was placed eleventh.

== Competition format ==
Slalom canoeing uses a three-round format, with heats, semifinal, and final. In the heats, each canoeist has two runs at the course with the better time counting. The top 22 advance to the semifinal. In the semifinal, the canoeists get a single run; the top 12 advance to the final. The best time in the single-run final wins gold.

The canoe course is approximately 250 metres long, with up to 25 gates that the canoeist must pass in the correct direction. Penalty time is added for infractions such as passing on the wrong side or touching a gate. Runs typically last approximately 95 seconds.

== Schedule ==
All times are Central European Summer Time (UTC+2)

The women's slalom K-1 took place over two consecutive days.

Date	Time	Round
27 July 2024	16:00	Heats
28 July 2024	15:30; 17:45	Semifinal; Final

== Results ==
Rank	Bib	Canoeist	Nation	Preliminary Heats						Semifinal			Final		
Rank	Bib	Canoeist	Nation	1st Ride	Pen.	2nd Ride	Pen.	Best	Order	Time	Pen.	Order	Time	Pen.	Order
1st place, gold medalist(s)	1	Jessica Fox	Australia	95.20	0	92.18	0	92.18	1	104.38	2	8	96.08	0	1
2nd place, silver medalist(s)	4	Klaudia Zwolińska	Poland	96.33	4	93.03	0	93.03	2	99.84	0	2	97.53	0	2
3rd place, bronze medalist(s)	9	Kimberley Woods	Great Britain	97.31	0	95.95	4	95.95	12	99.87	0	3	98.94	0	3
4	13	Ana Sátila	Brazil	98.83	0	96.88	0	96.88	14	102.23	0	5	100.69	0	4
5	5	Stefanie Horn	Italy	99.64	2	95.43	2	95.43	7	101.04	0	4	101.43	0	5
6	3	Camille Prigent	France	94.67	2	93.25	0	93.25	3	104.36	0	7	101.67	2	6
7	6	Eva Terčelj	Slovenia	99.08	4	95.93	2	95.93	11	105.11	2	10	101.73	0	7
8	14	Luuka Jones	New Zealand	102.90	6	97.13	4	97.13	15	104.91	0	9	102.33	2	8
9	10	Eliška Mintálová	Slovakia	95.67	2	99.76	4	95.67	9	103.07	0	6	102.98	2	9
10	8	Corinna Kuhnle	Austria	98.24	0	95.67	0	95.67	8	106.25	2	12	103.09	4	10
11	2	Ricarda Funk	Germany	97.15	2	94.95	2	94.95	6	99.31	2	1	149.08	50	11
12	7	Maialen Chourraut	Spain	101.06	0	96.33	2	96.33	13	106.21	0	11	157.67	52	12
13	11	Martina Wegman	Netherlands	98.00	2	100.61	4	98.00	16	106.38	4	13	did not advance		
14	19	Carole Bouzidi	Algeria	99.41	0	99.50	0	99.41	19	108.75	2	14	did not advance		
15	15	Evy Leibfarth	United States	97.24	0	93.84	0	93.84	4	109.54	2	15	did not advance		
16	25	Li Shiting	China	110.39	2	101.63	2	101.63	20	111.04	2	16	did not advance		
17	20	Aki Yazawa	Japan	106.01	4	107.16	4	106.01	21	114.50	4	17	did not advance		
18	16	Viktoriia Us	Ukraine	100.42	0	98.65	0	98.65	18	120.76	6	18	did not advance		
19	18	Alena Marx	Switzerland	102.13	2	98.22	0	98.22	17	123.62	4	19	did not advance		
20	22	Lois Betteridge	Canada	106.45	2	106.21	2	106.21	22	127.67	8	20	did not advance		
21	17	Antonie Galušková	Czech Republic	97.31	0	94.49	0	94.49	5	155.66	50	21	did not advance		
22	12	Mònica Dòria	Andorra	95.93	0	98.51	4	95.93	10	156.28	54	22	did not advance		
23	23	Chang Chu-han	Chinese Taipei	109.92	2	117.93	2	109.92	23	did not advance					
24	21	Madison Corcoran	Ireland	159.62	54	115.93	4	115.93	24	did not advance					
25	24	Sofía Reinoso	Mexico	122.40	4	120.93	8	120.93	25	did not advance					
