= Canoeing at the 2014 Asian Games – Women's slalom K-1 =

Women's K-1 at the 2014 Asian Games
- Venue: Misari Regatta
- Date: 1–2 October 2014
- Competitors: 14 from 10 nations

Medalists
gold medal	Li Tong	China
silver medal	Chang Chu-han	Chinese Taipei
bronze medal	Aki Yazawa	Japan

The women's K-1 slalom canoeing competition at the 2014 Asian Games in Hanam was held from 1 to 2 October at the Misari Canoe/Kayak Center. The slalom event was on flat water and not an artificial canoe slalom course. Each NOC could enter two athletes but only one of them could advance to the semifinal.

== Schedule ==
All times are Korea Standard Time (UTC+09:00)

Date	Time	Event
Wednesday, 1 October 2014	10:46	Heats
Wednesday, 1 October 2014	12:17	Repechage
Wednesday, 1 October 2014	16:05	Quarterfinals
Thursday, 2 October 2014	15:20	Semifinals
Thursday, 2 October 2014	15:50	Finals

== Results ==
Legend

- DSQ — Disqualified

=== Heats ===
Rank	Athlete	Time
1	Li Lu (CHN)	1:07.92
2	Li Tong (CHN)	1:07.94
3	Chang Chu-han (TPE)	1:10.36
4	Aki Yazawa (JPN)	1:11.49
5	Yoshika Ito (JPN)	1:13.09
6	Shaghayegh Seyed-Yousefi (IRI)	1:14.29
7	Sirijit Onnom (THA)	1:20.76
8	Annabelle Ng (SIN)	1:23.12
9	Chu Min-hee (KOR)	1:25.07
10	Ganeshvri Dhurwe (IND)	1:26.99
11	Geraldine Lee (SIN)	1:27.97
12	Ho Yin Ngai (HKG)	1:31.30
13	Champa Mourya (IND)	1:31.89
—	Xeniya Kondratenko (KAZ)	DSQ

=== Repechage ===
Rank	Athlete	Time
1	Shaghayegh Seyed-Yousefi (IRI)	1:13.99
2	Sirijit Onnom (THA)	1:19.89
3	Annabelle Ng (SIN)	1:24.56
4	Chu Min-hee (KOR)	1:25.57
5	Ganeshvri Dhurwe (IND)	1:28.03
6	Geraldine Lee (SIN)	1:28.85
7	Champa Mourya (IND)	1:29.39
8	Ho Yin Ngai (HKG)	1:30.92
—	Yoshika Ito (JPN)	DSQ

=== Knockout round ===
Quarterfinals
1	Li Lu (CHN)	1:10.77
5	Shaghayegh Seyed-Yousefi (IRI)	1:16.32
2	Li Tong (CHN)	1:09.02
6	Sirijit Onnom (THA)	1:25.24
3	Chang Chu-han (TPE)	1:13.66
7	Annabelle Ng (SIN)	1:27.97
4	Aki Yazawa (JPN)	1:16.22
8	Chu Min-hee (KOR)	1:29.45

Semifinals
1	Li Tong (CHN)	1:09.21
3	Aki Yazawa (JPN)	1:15.30
(Pairings are reseeded after the first round)
2	Chang Chu-han (TPE)	1:12.28
4	Shaghayegh Seyed-Yousefi (IRI)	1:15.75

Gold medal
1	Li Tong (CHN)	1:09.42
2	Chang Chu-han (TPE)	1:12.56
Bronze medal
3	Aki Yazawa (JPN)	1:14.36
4	Shaghayegh Seyed-Yousefi (IRI)	1:16.44

- Li Lu (CHN) got eliminated because each NOC was limited to one athlete in the semifinal.
