= Canoeing at the 2018 Asian Games – Women's slalom K-1 =

Women's K-1 at the 2018 Asian Games
- Venue: Bendung Rentang
- Date: 21–22 August 2018
- Competitors: 12 from 9 nations

Medalists
gold medal	Aki Yazawa	Japan
silver medal	Li Tong	China
bronze medal	Chang Chu-han	Chinese Taipei

The women's slalom K-1 (kayak single) competition at the 2018 Asian Games was held from 21 to 22 August 2018. Each NOC could enter two athletes but only one of them could advance to the final.

== Schedule ==
All times are Western Indonesia Time (UTC+07:00)

Date	Time	Event
Tuesday, 21 August 2018	10:02	Heats
Wednesday, 22 August 2018	11:12	Semifinal
Wednesday, 22 August 2018	12:55	Final

== Results ==
Legend

- DNF — Did not finish
- DNS — Did not start

=== Heats ===
Rank	Athlete	1st run			2nd run			Best
Rank	Athlete	Time	Pen.	Total	Time	Pen.	Total	Best
1	Aki Yazawa (JPN)	88.82	0	88.82			DNS	88.82
2	Ren Ye (CHN)	93.58	0	93.58			DNS	93.58
3	Li Tong (CHN)	93.88	0	93.88			DNS	93.88
4	Yuriko Takeshita (JPN)	100.91	4	104.91	102.98	2	104.98	104.91
5	Chang Chu-han (TPE)	99.10	8	107.10	102.64	6	108.64	107.10
6	Kamilla Safina (KAZ)	107.46	0	107.46	119.50	4	123.50	107.46
7	Roksana Razeghian (IRI)	119.16	4	123.16	108.26	4	112.26	112.26
8	Sumita Kurnia (INA)	134.39	2	136.39	114.32	2	116.32	116.32
9	Jaruwan Niamthong (THA)	114.55	6	120.55		2	DNF	120.55
10	Thatchaporn Pornchai (THA)	123.94	2	125.94	116.31	8	124.31	124.31
11	Aarti Pandey (IND)	133.65	4	137.65	136.73	12	148.73	137.65
12	Marina Muzaffa (MAS)	157.24	12	169.24	147.97	10	157.97	157.97

=== Semifinal ===
Rank	Athlete	Time	Pen.	Total
1	Li Tong (CHN)	97.37	0	97.37
2	Aki Yazawa (JPN)	100.50	0	100.50
3	Ren Ye (CHN)	103.25	0	103.25
4	Yuriko Takeshita (JPN)	105.05	0	105.05
5	Chang Chu-han (TPE)	112.59	2	114.59
6	Sumita Kurnia (INA)	122.45	2	124.45
7	Roksana Razeghian (IRI)	134.59	4	138.59
8	Thatchaporn Pornchai (THA)	141.85	2	143.85
9	Jaruwan Niamthong (THA)	145.43	6	151.43
10	Kamilla Safina (KAZ)	114.45	52	166.45

=== Final ===
Rank	Athlete	Time	Pen.	Total
1st place, gold medalist(s)	Aki Yazawa (JPN)	95.83	0	95.83
2nd place, silver medalist(s)	Li Tong (CHN)	100.17	0	100.17
3rd place, bronze medalist(s)	Chang Chu-han (TPE)	101.80	2	103.80
4	Kamilla Safina (KAZ)	118.25	0	118.25
5	Thatchaporn Pornchai (THA)	119.25	6	125.25
6	Roksana Razeghian (IRI)	130.03	4	134.03
7	Sumita Kurnia (INA)	144.80	4	148.80
