= Naemi Brändle =

Swiss Canoeist (born 2001)

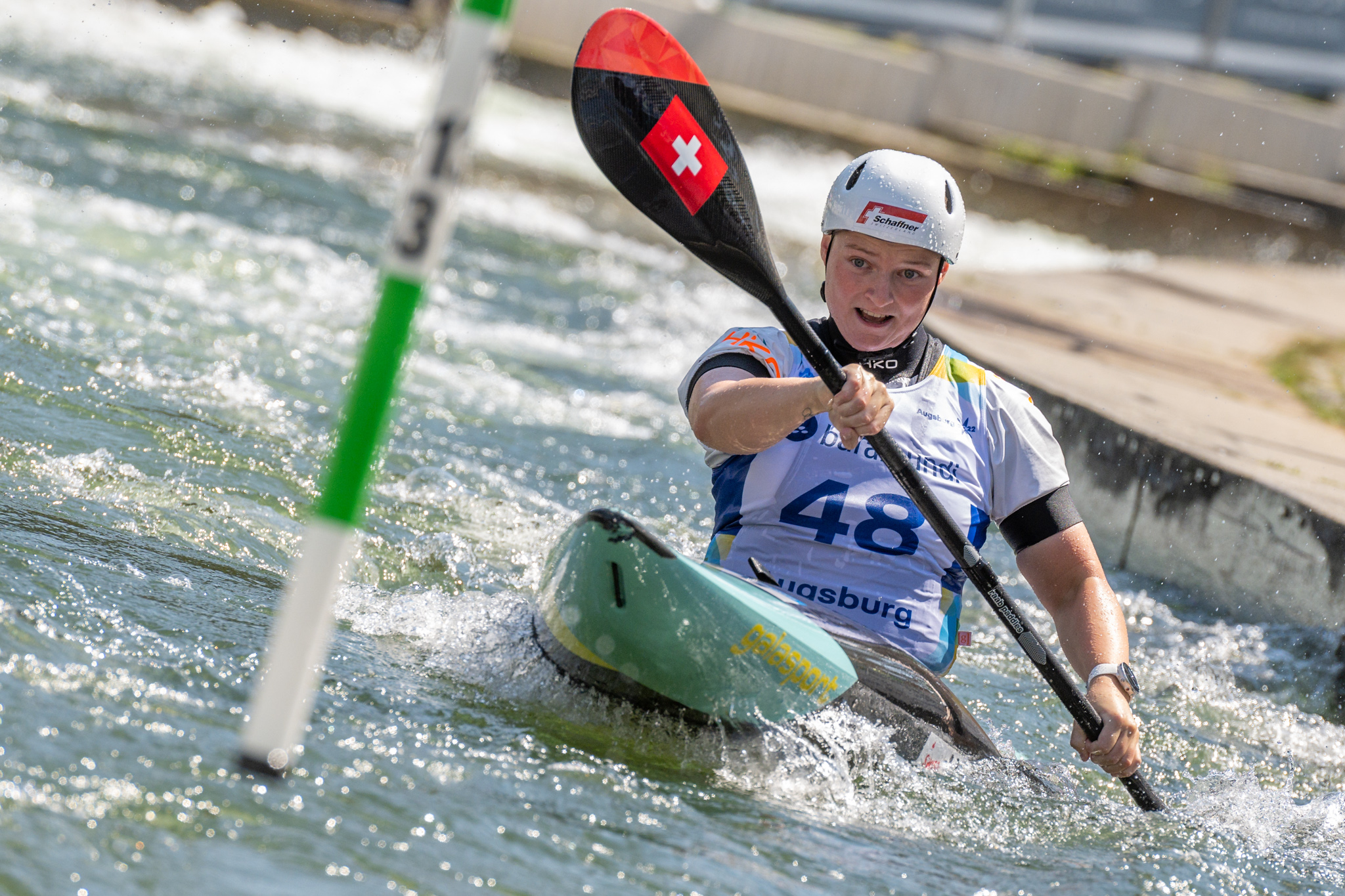
- Naemi Brändle performing at 2022 ICF Canoe Slalom World Championships in Augsburg, Germany

Personal information
- Nationality: Swiss
- Born: 20 June 2001 Frauenfeld

Sport
- Country: Switzerland
- Sport: Canoe slalom
- Event: K1
- Club: Thurgauer Wildwasser Fahrer
Medal record
Women's canoe slalom
Representing Switzerland
U23 World Championships
Silver medal – second place	2022 Ivrea	Extreme K1
Junior World Championships
Bronze medal – third place	2018 Ivrea	K1

Naemi Brändle (born 20 June 2001) is a Swiss slalom canoeist who has competed at the international level since 2016.

Naemi won a bronze medal in the K1 event at the 2018 Junior World Championships in Ivrea. She earned her best senior world championship result of 55th place at the 2019 event in La Seu d'Urgell.

Brändle finished 9th at the 2021 European Championships in Ivrea, earning an Olympic quota for Switzerland and for herself. Naemi represented Switzerland in the K1 event at the 2020 Summer Olympics in Tokyo, finishing in 18th place.
