= Marie-Zélia Lafont =

French slalom canoeist (born 1987)

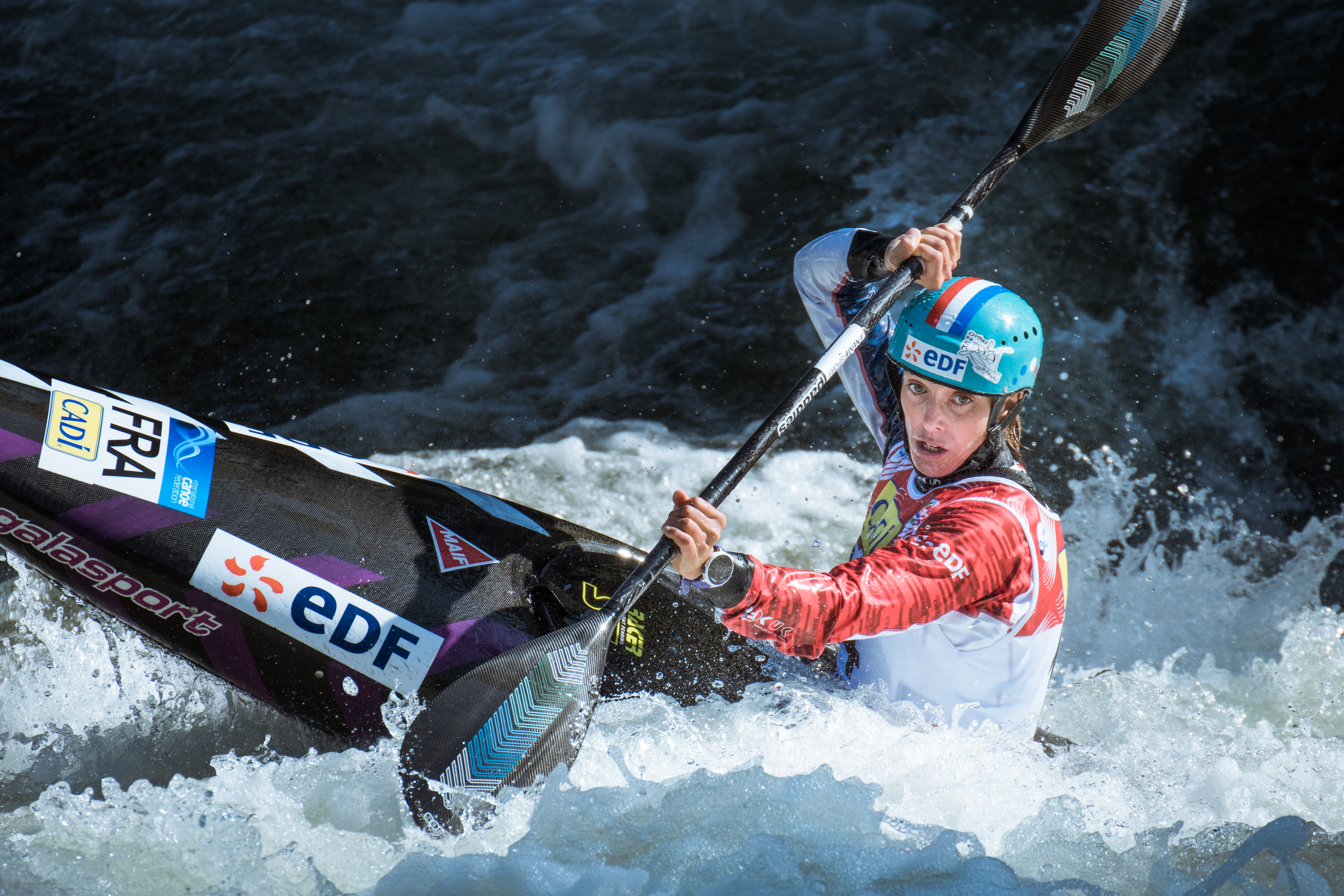

Personal information
- Nationality: French
- Born: 9 January 1987 (age 39) Orthez, France
- Height: 1.71 m (5 ft 7 in)
- Weight: 63 kg (139 lb)

Sport
- Country: France
- Sport: Canoe slalom
- Event: K1
- Club: Orthez Nautique CK
Medal record
Women's canoe slalom
Representing France
World Championships
Gold medal – first place	2018 Rio de Janeiro	K1 team
Bronze medal – third place	2015 London	K1 team
European Championships
Gold medal – first place	2013 Kraków	K1 team
Gold medal – first place	2019 Pau	K1 team
Bronze medal – third place	2015 Markkleeberg	K1 team
Bronze medal – third place	2017 Tacen	K1
Bronze medal – third place	2017 Tacen	K1 team
U23 European Championships
Silver medal – second place	2009 Liptovský Mikuláš	K1 team
Bronze medal – third place	2006 Nottingham	K1 team
Junior European Championships
Bronze medal – third place	2003 Hohenlimburg	K1 team
Bronze medal – third place	2005 Kraków	K1 team

Marie-Zélia Lafont (born 9 January 1987) is a French slalom canoeist who has competed at the international level since 2003.

She won two medals in the K1 team event at the ICF Canoe Slalom World Championships, with a gold in 2018 and a bronze in 2015. She also won two golds and three bronzes at the European Championships.

Lafont participated in two Olympic Games. She finished in 16th place in the K1 event at the 2016 Summer Olympics in Rio de Janeiro and 14th in the K1 event at the 2020 Summer Olympics in Tokyo.

== World Cup individual podiums ==
Season	Date	Venue	Position	Event
2016	19 June 2016	Pau	1st	K1
2020	7 November 2020	Pau	1st	K1
