= Hind Jamili =

Moroccan canoeist

Personal information
- Nationality: Moroccan
- Born: 11 December 1998 (age 27)
- Height: 1.56 m (5 ft 1 in)
- Weight: 50 kg (110 lb)

Sport
- Country: Morocco
- Sport: Canoeing

Hind Jamili (born 11 December 1998) is a Moroccan slalom canoeist who has competed since 2013.

She finished in 21st place in the K1 event at the 2016 Summer Olympics in Rio de Janeiro.
