= Yekaterina Smirnova (canoeist) =

Kazakhstani canoeist

Personal information
- Born: 21 May 1988 (age 38) Oskemen, Kazakhstan
- Height: 165 cm (5 ft 5 in)
- Weight: 63 kg (139 lb)
Medal record
Women's canoe slalom
Representing Kazakhstan
Asian Championships
Gold medal – first place	2016 Toyama	C1 team
Silver medal – second place	2013 Shuili	C1 team
Silver medal – second place	2016 Toyama	K1 team
Bronze medal – third place	2013 Shuili	K1

Yekaterina Smirnova (Екатерина Смирнова, born 21 May 1988), née Lukicheva (Лукичёва), is a Kazakhstani slalom canoeist who has competed at the international level since 2004.

Smirnova competed in three Olympic Games. She was eliminated in the semifinals of the K1 event at the 2008 Summer Olympics in Beijing, finishing in 12th place. She then finished in 19th place in the K1 event at the 2016 Summer Olympics in Rio de Janeiro after being eliminated in the heats. At the delayed 2020 Summer Olympics in Tokyo, she finished 25th in the K1 event, once again eliminated in the heats.
