= Célia Jodar =

Moroccan canoeist

Personal information
- Full name: Célia Nawal Jodar
- Nationality: Moroccan, French
- Born: 20 April 1988 (age 36); Fontainebleau, France

Sport
- Country: Morocco
- Sport: Canoe slalom
- Event: K1

Célia Nawal Jodar (born 20 April 1988), also known as Célia Jodar, is a French-born Moroccan slalom canoeist who has competed at the international level since 2009.

Jodar made her Olympics debut when she competed in the women's K1 event at the delayed 2020 Summer Olympics in Tokyo. She finished 27th after being eliminated in the heats.
