= Canoeing at the 2016 Summer Olympics – Women's slalom K-1 =

Women's canoe slalom K-1 at the Games of the XXXI Olympiad
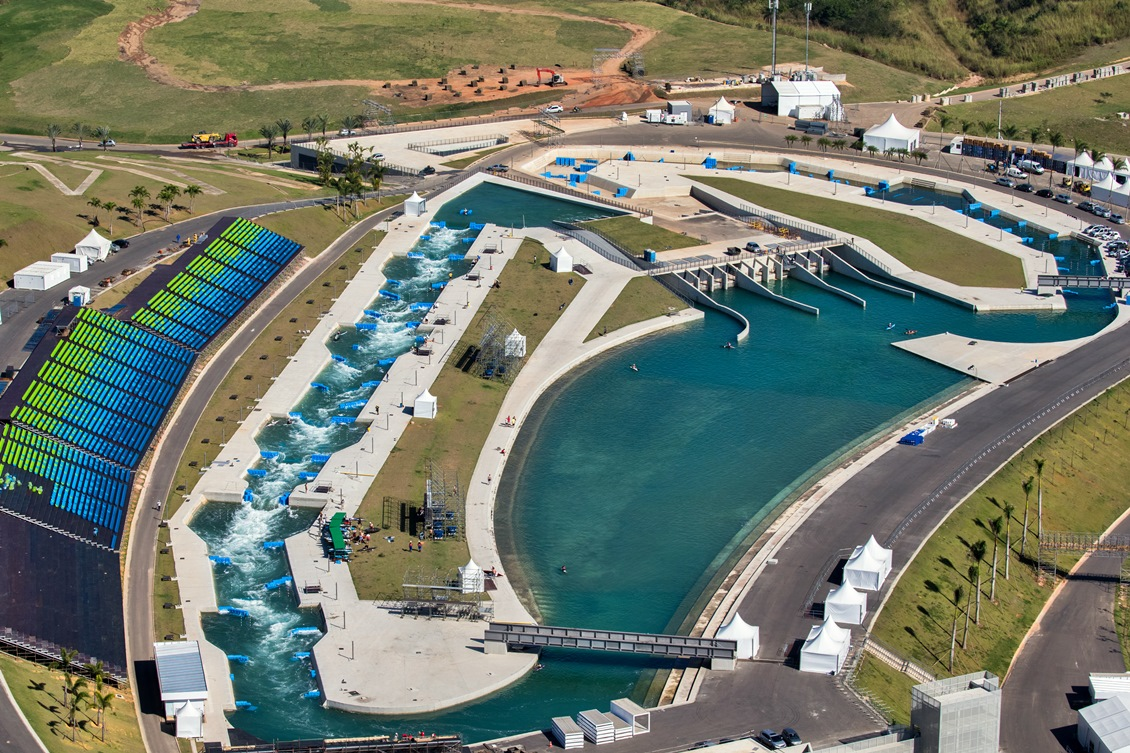
- Aerial view of the Olympic Whitewater Stadium, where the Women's canoe slalom K-1 took place.
- Venue: Olympic Whitewater Stadium
- Date: 8–11 August 2016
- Competitors: 21 from 21 nations
- Winning time: 98.65 s

Medalists
1st place, gold medalist(s)		Maialen Chourraut	Spain
2nd place, silver medalist(s)		Luuka Jones	New Zealand
3rd place, bronze medalist(s)		Jessica Fox	Australia

The women's canoe slalom K-1 competition at the 2016 Olympic Games in Rio de Janeiro took place between 7 and 11 August at the Olympic Whitewater Stadium.

The gold medal was won by Maialen Chourraut of Spain.

== Schedule ==
All times are Brasília Time (UTC−3).

Date	Time	Round
Monday 8 August 2016	13:10	Heats
Thursday 11 August 2016	13:15	Semi-final
Thursday 11 August 2016	15:00	Final

Slalom gate positions for Heats, 7-8 August.

Slalom gate positions for Semi-Finals and Finals, 9-11 August.

== Results ==
Order	Name	Preliminary Heats						Semifinal			Final		
Order	Name	1st Ride	Pen.	2nd Ride	Pen.	Best	Order	Time	Pen.	Order	Time	Pen.	Order
1st place, gold medalist(s)	Maialen Chourraut (ESP)	155.43	52	106.47	4	106.47	11	101.83	0	3	98.65	0	1
2nd place, silver medalist(s)	Luuka Jones (NZL)	100.59	0	101.96	2	100.59	4	108.05	2	7	101.82	0	2
3rd place, bronze medalist(s)	Jessica Fox (AUS)	107.88	2	99.51	2	99.51	2	104.50	0	5	102.49	2	3
4	Jana Dukátová (SVK)	102.25	2	155.87	50	102.25	6	106.59	2	6	103.86	2	4
5	Corinna Kuhnle (AUT)	109.63	0	107.02	0	107.02	12	101.54	0	1	104.75	4	5
6	Fiona Pennie (GBR)	100.52	2	DNS	-	100.52	3	101.81	0	2	105.70	4	6
7	Melanie Pfeifer (GER)	115.60	2	107.30	2	107.30	14	108.58	0	10	106.89	2	7
8	Stefanie Horn (ITA)	106.90	4	99.07	0	99.07	1	108.30	0	8	107.22	2	8
9	Urša Kragelj (SLO)	106.86	2	102.79	0	102.79	7	108.37	2	9	108.68	2	9
10	Kateřina Kudějová (CZE)	102.06	2	106.10	8	102.06	5	103.78	0	4	108.76	2	10
11	Natalia Pacierpnik (POL)	106.38	2	167.18	50	106.38	10	109.63	2	11	did not advance		
12	Viktoriia Us (UKR)	109.77	0	109.92	2	109.77	15	111.12	2	12	did not advance		
13	Li Lu (CHN)	119.63	6	107.29	4	107.29	13	111.24	2	13	did not advance		
14	Ashley Nee (USA)	113.15	4	105.60	0	105.60	9	116.59	4	14	did not advance		
15	Marta Kharitonova (RUS)	111.01	2	104.72	0	104.72	8	160.39	52	15	did not advance		
16	Marie-Zélia Lafont (FRA)	110.52	6	118.67	2	110.52	16	did not advance					
17	Ana Sátila (BRA)	110.80	2	149.12	50	110.80	17	did not advance					
18	Ella Nicholas (COK)	119.69	2	316.72	202	119.69	18	did not advance					
19	Yekaterina Smirnova (KAZ)	127.64	2	119.80	4	119.80	19	did not advance					
20	Aki Yazawa (JPN)	120.17	4	128.00	6	120.17	20	did not advance					
21	Hind Jamili (MAR)	153.00	12	149.87	8	149.87	21	did not advance					
