= Olatz Arregui =

Spanish slalom canoeist

Personal information
- Nationality: Spanish
- Born: 30 April 1999 (age 27) San Sebastián, Spain

Sport
- Country: Spain
- Sport: Canoe slalom
- Event: K1, Kayak cross
Medal record
Women's canoe slalom
Representing Spain
World Championships
Silver medal – second place	2023 London	K1 team
U23 European Championships
Silver medal – second place	2022 České Budějovice	Kayak cross

Olatz Arregui (born 30 April 1999) is a Spanish slalom canoeist who has competed at the international level since 2016.

She won a silver medal in the K1 team event at the 2023 World Championships in London.

== World Cup individual podiums ==
Season	Date	Venue	Position	Event
2022	4 September 2022	La Seu d'Urgell	3rd	Kayak cross
