= Luuka Jones =

New Zealand canoeist (born 1988)

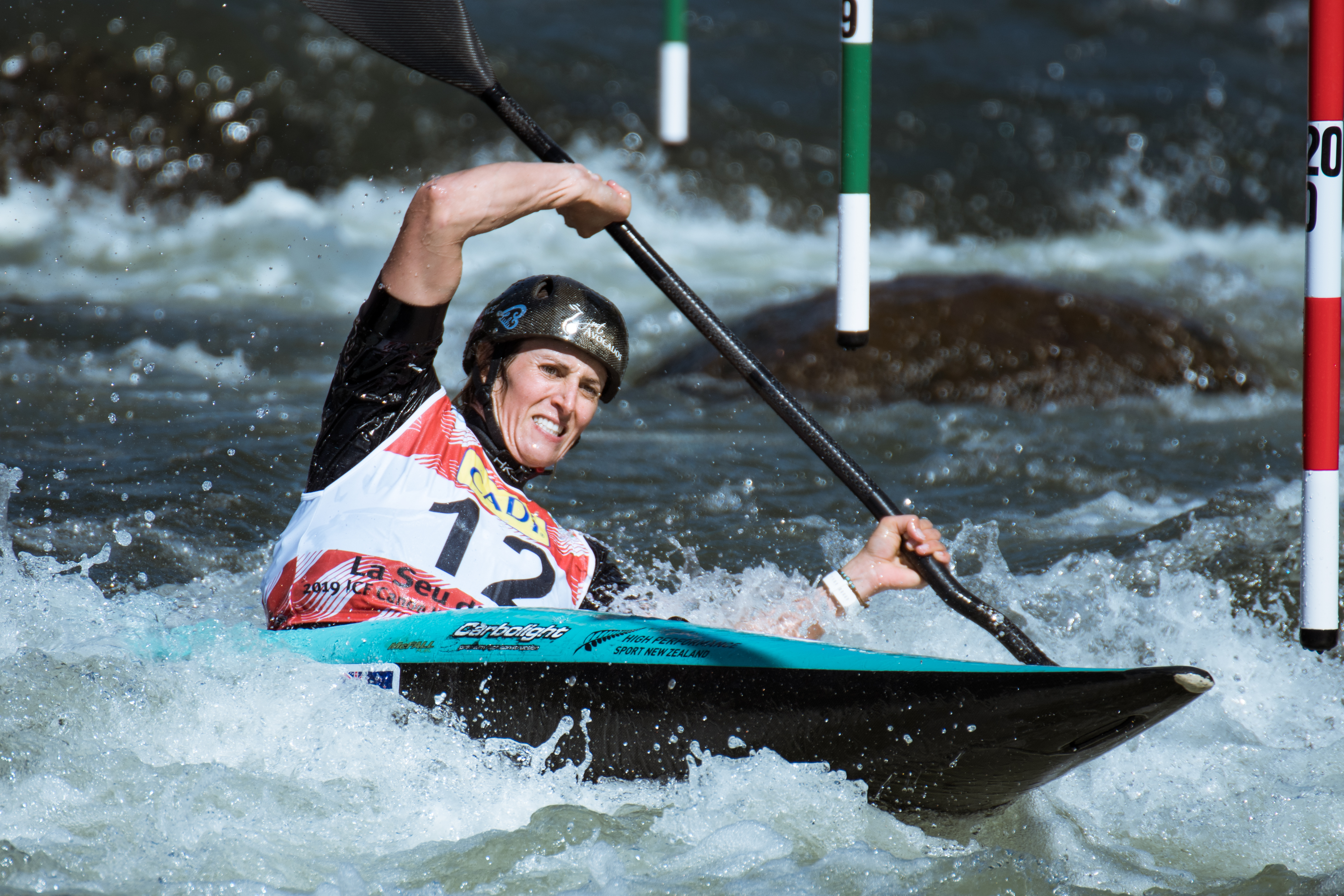
- Jones at the 2019 Canoe Slalom World Championships

Personal information
- Full name: Luuka Jones-Yaxley
- Nationality: New Zealand
- Born: 18 October 1988 (age 38) Tauranga, New Zealand
- Height: 1.72 m (5 ft 8 in)
- Weight: 63 kg (139 lb)

Sport
- Country: New Zealand
- Sport: Canoe slalom
- Events: K1, Kayak cross, C1
- Club: Canoe Slalom Bay of Plenty
Medal record
Women's canoe slalom
Representing New Zealand
Olympic Games
| Silver medal – second place | 2016 Rio de Janeiro | K1 |
World Championships
| Bronze medal – third place | 2019 La Seu d'Urgell | K1 |
- Updated on 28 September 2016

Luuka Jones (born 18 October 1988) is a New Zealand slalom canoeist who has competed at the international level since 2006.

She is a five-time Olympian and has won a silver medal in the K1 event at the 2016 Summer Olympics.

== Early life ==
Jones was born in Tauranga in 1988. Her mother Denise Jones was a fan of the British actress Audrey Hepburn and Luuka Jones was named after Hepburn's second son, Luca Dotti. Her father is Rod Jones and she has three sisters. She was brought up adjacent to the Wairoa River. She took up kayaking at age ten and received lessons from Waimarino Adventure Park nearby. She went to Otumoetai Intermediate where in Year Seven, she set her goal to win an Olympic medal.

== Canoeing career ==
Jones started competing in 2003 at age 14. In preparation for the 2008 Summer Olympics, she moved to England to train with the British team. She was the first female canoe slalom paddler to represent New Zealand at the Olympic Games.

She competed in the K1 event at the 2008 Beijing Olympics where she finished last in 21st position, thus being eliminated in the heats. At the 2012 Summer Olympics in London she qualified for the semi-finals of the K1 event where she finished in 14th place. At the 2016 Summer Olympics in Rio de Janeiro she won a silver medal in the K1 event. Jones recorded her 4th Olympic participation at the 2020 Summer Olympics in Tokyo where she started in both women's events. She finished 6th in the final of the K1 event and 13th in the C1 event after being eliminated in the semifinal. At her 5th Olympics in 2024 in Paris, she finished 8th in the K1 event and 5th in kayak cross.

Jones won a bronze medal in the K1 event at the 2019 ICF Canoe Slalom World Championships in La Seu d'Urgell.

== World Cup individual podiums ==
| Season | Date | Venue | Position | Event |
|---|---|---|---|---|
| 2009 | 1 February 2009 | Mangahao | 2nd | K1^{1} |
| 2019 | 22 June 2019 | Bratislava | 2nd | K1 |
| 2021 | 5 September 2021 | La Seu d'Urgell | 2nd | Kayak cross |
| 2023 | 8 October 2023 | Vaires-sur-Marne | 1st | Kayak cross |

^{1} Oceania Championship counting for World Cup points

== Personal life ==
Jones moved to England at age 17 to further her canoe career and divides her time between Nottingham and New Zealand, spending the Northern Hemisphere summer based in Europe where most of the competitions are held. She studies business extramurally at Massey University, majoring in communication. She receives sponsorship from businesses based in Tauranga. Apart from canoe, Jones enjoys surfing, mountain biking and making sushi.
