= Kimberley Woods =

British slalom canoeist

Kimberley Woods OLY
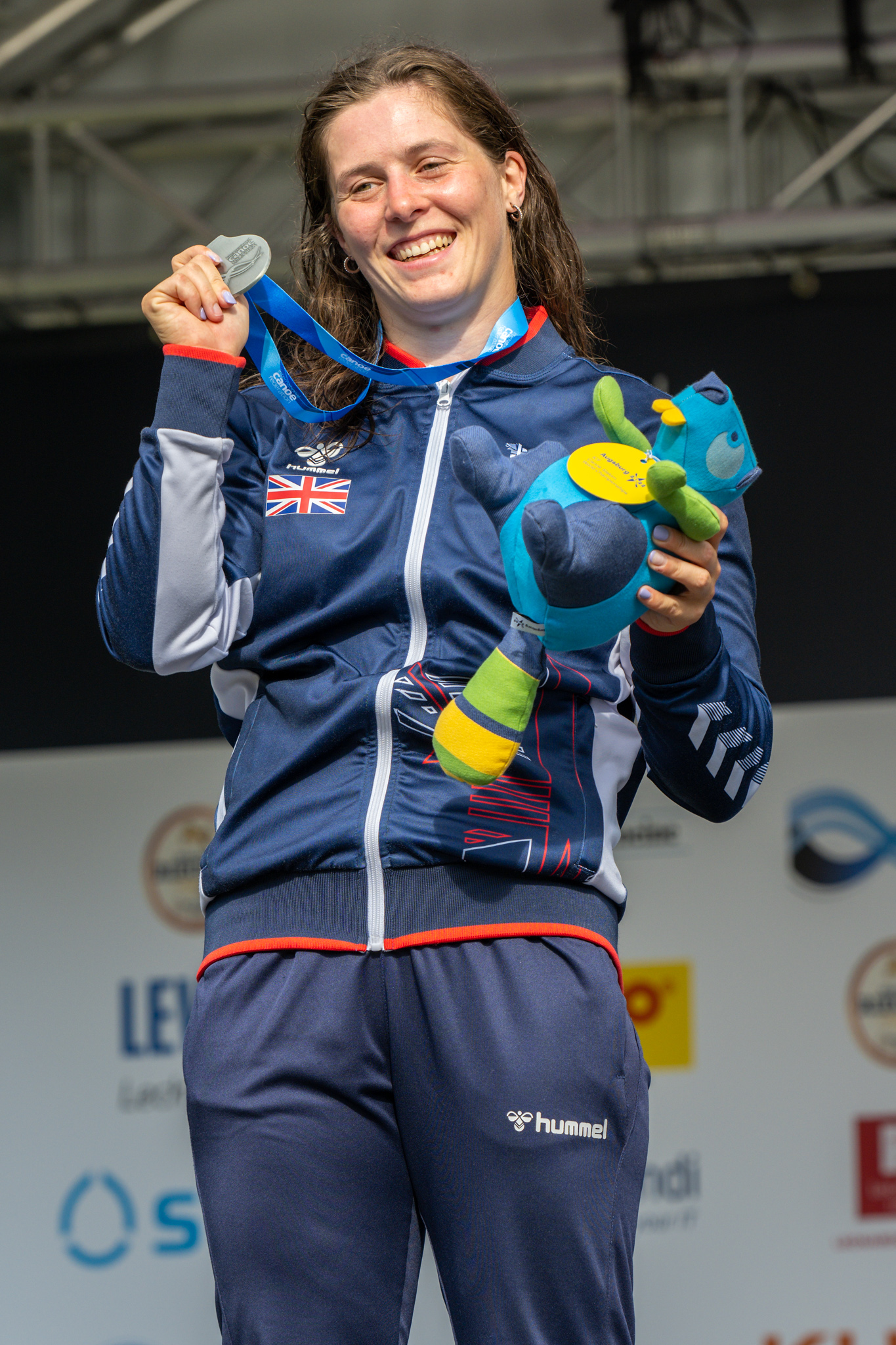
- Woods in 2022

Personal information
- Full name: Kimberley Katie Woods
- Nationality: British
- Born: 8 September 1995 (age 31) Rugby, England
- Height: 1.62 m (5 ft 4 in)
- Weight: 62 kg (137 lb)

Sport
- Country: Great Britain
- Sport: Canoe slalom
- Event: C1, K1, Kayak cross
- Club: Rugby Canoe Club
Medal record
Women's canoe slalom
Representing Great Britain
Olympic Games
Bronze medal – third place	2024 Paris	K1
Bronze medal – third place	2024 Paris	Kayak cross
World Championships
Gold medal – first place	2017 Pau	C1 team
Gold medal – first place	2018 Rio de Janeiro	C1 team
Gold medal – first place	2019 La Seu d'Urgell	K1 team
Gold medal – first place	2021 Bratislava	K1 team
Gold medal – first place	2023 London	Kayak cross
Gold medal – first place	2023 London	C1 team
Silver medal – second place	2015 London	K1 team
Silver medal – second place	2022 Augsburg	Kayak cross
Silver medal – second place	2023 London	C1
Silver medal – second place	2025 Penrith	K1
Bronze medal – third place	2018 Rio de Janeiro	K1 team
Bronze medal – third place	2021 Bratislava	K1
Bronze medal – third place	2022 Augsburg	C1 team
Bronze medal – third place	2023 London	K1 team
Bronze medal – third place	2025 Penrith	C1 team
Bronze medal – third place	2026 Oklahoma City	K1
European Games
Silver medal – second place	2023 Kraków	C1 team
European Championships
Gold medal – first place	2015 Markkleeberg	C1
Gold medal – first place	2016 Liptovský Mikuláš	C1 team
Gold medal – first place	2016 Liptovský Mikuláš	K1 team
Gold medal – first place	2017 Tacen	C1
Gold medal – first place	2017 Tacen	C1 team
Gold medal – first place	2018 Prague	C1 team
Gold medal – first place	2019 Pau	C1 team
Gold medal – first place	2021 Ivrea	K1 team
Gold medal – first place	2026 Ivrea	Kayak cross individual
Silver medal – second place	2021 Ivrea	C1 team
Silver medal – second place	2022 Liptovský Mikuláš	K1 team
Bronze medal – third place	2015 Markkleeberg	C1 team
Bronze medal – third place	2019 Pau	C1
Bronze medal – third place	2024 Tacen	C1 team
Bronze medal – third place	2025 Vaires-sur-Marne	Kayak cross individual
Bronze medal – third place	2025 Vaires-sur-Marne	K1 team
Bronze medal – third place	2026 Ivrea	C1 team
U23 World Championships
Gold medal – first place	2014 Penrith	K1 team
Gold medal – first place	2016 Kraków	C1 team
Gold medal – first place	2017 Bratislava	C1 team
Silver medal – second place	2016 Kraków	C1
Silver medal – second place	2017 Bratislava	K1 team
Silver medal – second place	2018 Ivrea	C1
Bronze medal – third place	2012 Wausau	C1 team
Bronze medal – third place	2015 Foz do Iguaçu	C1
Bronze medal – third place	2015 Foz do Iguaçu	C1 team
Bronze medal – third place	2017 Bratislava	C1
Bronze medal – third place	2018 Ivrea	K1
Bronze medal – third place	2018 Ivrea	K1 team
U23 European Championships
Gold medal – first place	2016 Solkan	C1
Gold medal – first place	2016 Solkan	C1 team
Silver medal – second place	2016 Solkan	K1
Bronze medal – third place	2012 Solkan	C1 team
Junior World Championships
Gold medal – first place	2012 Wausau	K1 team
Silver medal – second place	2013 Liptovský Mikuláš	K1
Bronze medal – third place	2012 Wausau	C1
Bronze medal – third place	2013 Liptovský Mikuláš	C1 team
Junior European Championships
Gold medal – first place	2012 Solkan	C1
Gold medal – first place	2013 Bourg-Saint-Maurice	C1
Silver medal – second place	2012 Solkan	K1
Silver medal – second place	2013 Bourg-Saint-Maurice	K1 team
Bronze medal – third place	2011 Banja Luka	K1 team

Kimberley Katie Woods (born 8 September 1995) is a British slalom canoeist who has competed in C1, K1 and KX1 at the international level since 2011. A six time world and eight time European champion, she won the bronze medal in both the K1 event and the first ever women's kayak-cross (KX1) event in Paris at the 2024 Summer Olympics.

== Life ==
=== Personal life ===
Woods was born in 1995, one of four children living in Rugby. Aged four she watched her aunt Diane, who was a silver medallist at the 1994 World Junior canoeing Championships, and was helped by her grandparents to get her own canoe. She was bullied as a child because of her physique and used canoeing as an escape from this. She won three medals at the world junior competitions but was forced to stop canoeing because of an injury and turned to self-harming.

In 2013 she attended Rugby College and later, the University of Hertfordshire.

Woods has been open about how she has struggled with mental health issues throughout her life. On two occasions she has checked into a private mental health hospital, and has stated how she experienced suicidal thoughts.

=== Canoeing ===
Woods has won 16 medals at the ICF Canoe Slalom World Championships with six golds (Kayak cross: 2023; C1 team: 2017, 2018, 2023; K1 team: 2019, 2021), four silvers (C1: 2023; K1: 2025; Kayak cross: 2022; K1 team: 2015) and six bronzes (K1: 2021, 2026; C1 team: 2022, 2025; K1 team: 2018, 2023).

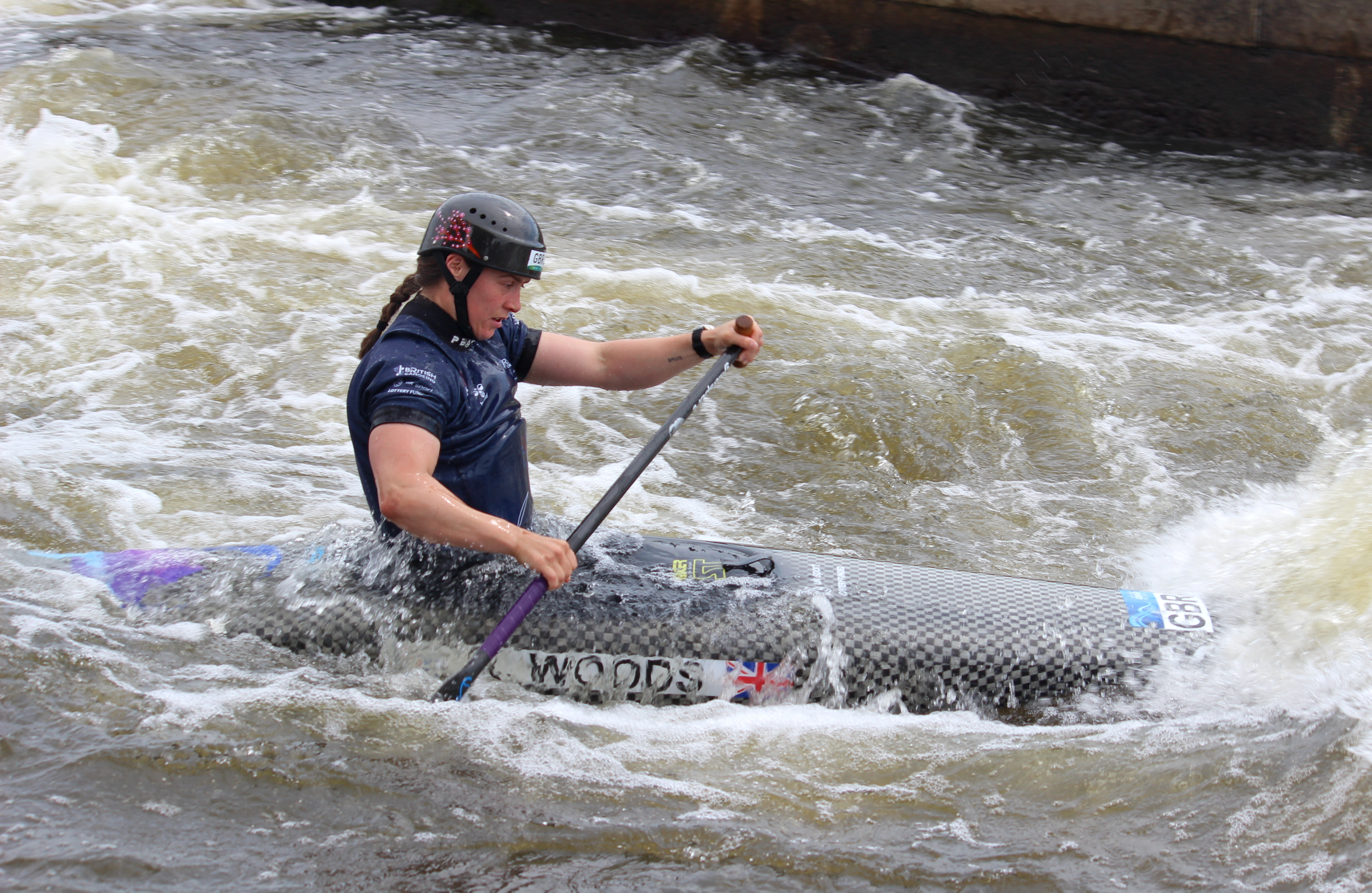
Woods in 2023 in Prague

She also won 18 medals (nine golds, three silvers and six bronzes) at the European Championships, including a silver in the C1 team event at the 2023 European Games in Kraków.

Woods won the overall World Cup title in K1 and C1 in 2025 and in Kayak cross in 2023 and 2024.

She qualified to represent Great Britain at the 2020 Summer Olympics in Tokyo in the Women's K1 event where she finished in 10th place.

In 2024 she returned to Olympic kayak competition, in Paris winning two bronze medals, one in the K1 event and another one in kayak cross.

== World Cup individual podiums ==
	1st place, gold medalist(s)	2nd place, silver medalist(s)	3rd place, bronze medalist(s)	Total
C1	4	4	7	15
K1	2	1	0	3
Kayak cross	3	4	1	8
Kayak cross individual	0	0	2	2
Total	9	9	10	28

Season	Date	Venue	Position	Event
2013	22 June 2013	Cardiff	1st	C1
2013	29 June 2013	Augsburg	3rd	C1
2015	27 June 2015	Kraków	2nd	C1
2015	8 August 2015	La Seu d'Urgell	3rd	C1
2016	4 June 2016	Ivrea	3rd	C1
2016	10 September 2016	Tacen	1st	C1
2017	17 June 2017	Prague	1st	C1
2017	18 June 2017	Prague	2nd	K1
2019	16 June 2019	Lee Valley	2nd	C1
2019	8 September 2019	Prague	2nd	C1
2022	26 June 2022	Tacen	1st	Kayak cross
2023	11 June 2023	Prague	1st	Kayak cross
2023	1 September 2023	La Seu d'Urgell	3rd	C1
2023	3 September 2023	La Seu d'Urgell	2nd	Kayak cross
2023	8 October 2023	Vaires-sur-Marne	2nd	Kayak cross
2024	16 June 2024	Kraków	3rd	Kayak cross
2024	14 September 2024	Ivrea	2nd	C1
2024	15 September 2024	Ivrea	2nd	Kayak cross
2024	21 September 2024	La Seu d'Urgell	3rd	C1
2024	22 September 2024	La Seu d'Urgell	2nd	Kayak cross
2025	29 August 2025	Tacen	1st	K1
2025	30 August 2025	Tacen	3rd	C1
2025	5 September 2025	Augsburg	1st	K1
2025	6 September 2025	Augsburg	1st	C1
2026	31 May 2026	Tacen	3rd	Kayak cross individual
2026	6 June 2026	Prague	3rd	C1
2026	5 September 2026	Vaires-sur-Marne	3rd	Kayak cross individual
2026	13 September 2026	La Seu d'Urgell	1st	Kayak cross
