= Kate Eckhardt =

Australian slalom canoeist

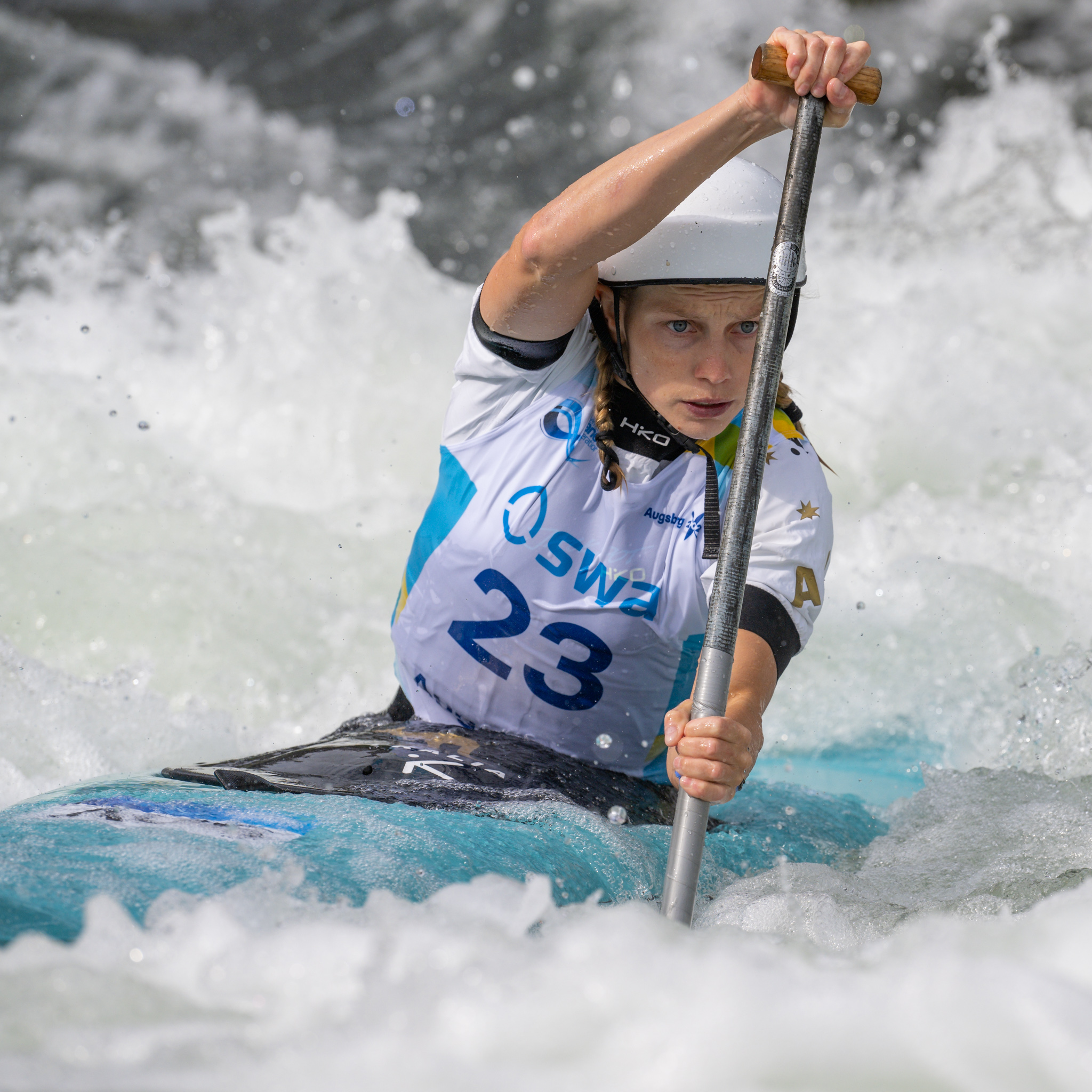
- Eckhardt in 2022

Personal information
- Nationality: Australian
- Born: 29 October 1997 (age 28)

Sport
- Country: Australia
- Sport: Canoe slalom
- Event: C1, K1
Medal record
Women's canoe slalom
Representing Australia
World Championships
Gold medal – first place	2023 London	K1 team
Gold medal – first place	2026 Oklahoma City	K1 team
Bronze medal – third place	2017 Pau	K1 team
Bronze medal – third place	2025 Penrith	K1
Oceania Championships
Bronze medal – third place	2025 Penrith	C1
Bronze medal – third place	2025 Penrith	K1
U23 World Championships
Bronze medal – third place	2017 Bratislava	K1 team
Bronze medal – third place	2019 Kraków	C1 team
Junior World Championships
Silver medal – second place	2014 Penrith	K1
Bronze medal – third place	2015 Foz do Iguaçu	C1
Bronze medal – third place	2015 Foz do Iguaçu	K1 team

Kate Eckhardt (born 29 October 1997) is an Australian slalom canoeist who has competed at the international level since 2013.

She won four medals at the ICF Canoe Slalom World Championships with two golds (K1 team: 2023, 2026) and two bronzes (K1: 2025, K1 team: 2017).

She studied Health Sciences at Deakin University.
