= Claudia Leenders =

Dutch canoeist

Medal record

Women's canoe slalom

Representing Netherlands

U23 European Championships
Gold medal – first place	2017 Hohenlimburg	K1 team

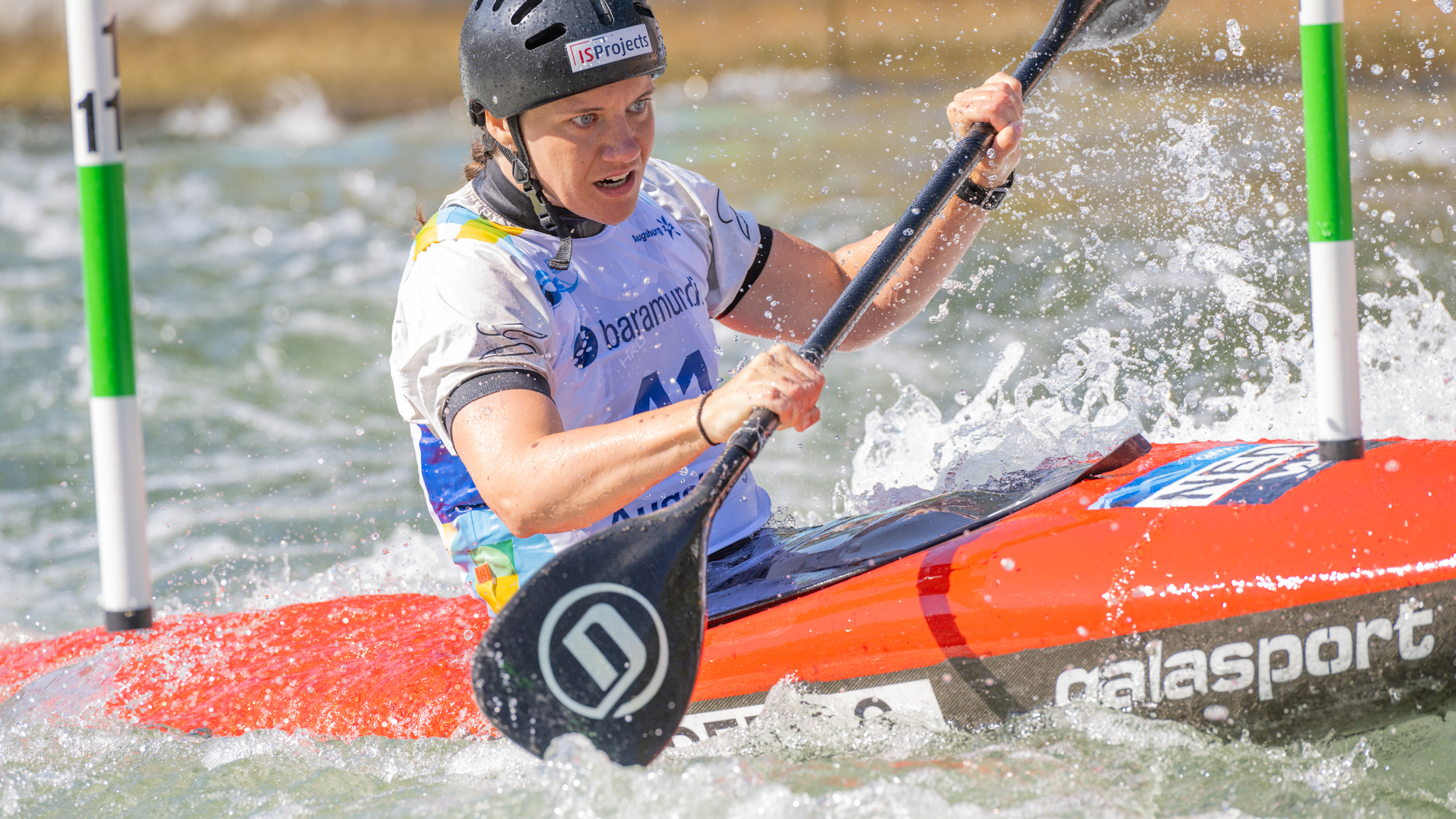
Claudia Leenders performing at 2022 ICF Canoe Slalom World Championships in Augsburg, Germany

Claudia Leenders (born 18 November 1994 in Helmond) is a Dutch slalom canoeist who has competed at the international level since 2009.

She became a member of HWC Helmet sailors, the canoe club in Helmond, at the age of 8 because her older brother Stijn and her father had been active in the sport of canoeing. Leenders and her brother were selected for the Talent Development Team when Claudia was eleven years old. In 2009 she qualified for the Junior European Championships and the Junior World Cup. She made her first appearances at the senior level in 2010, with participations at the European Championships, World Championships and the World Cup.
