= Deodoro Olympic Whitewater Stadium =

Whitewater sports venue in Rio de Janeiro, Brazil

Coordinates: 22.8486°S 43.4026°W

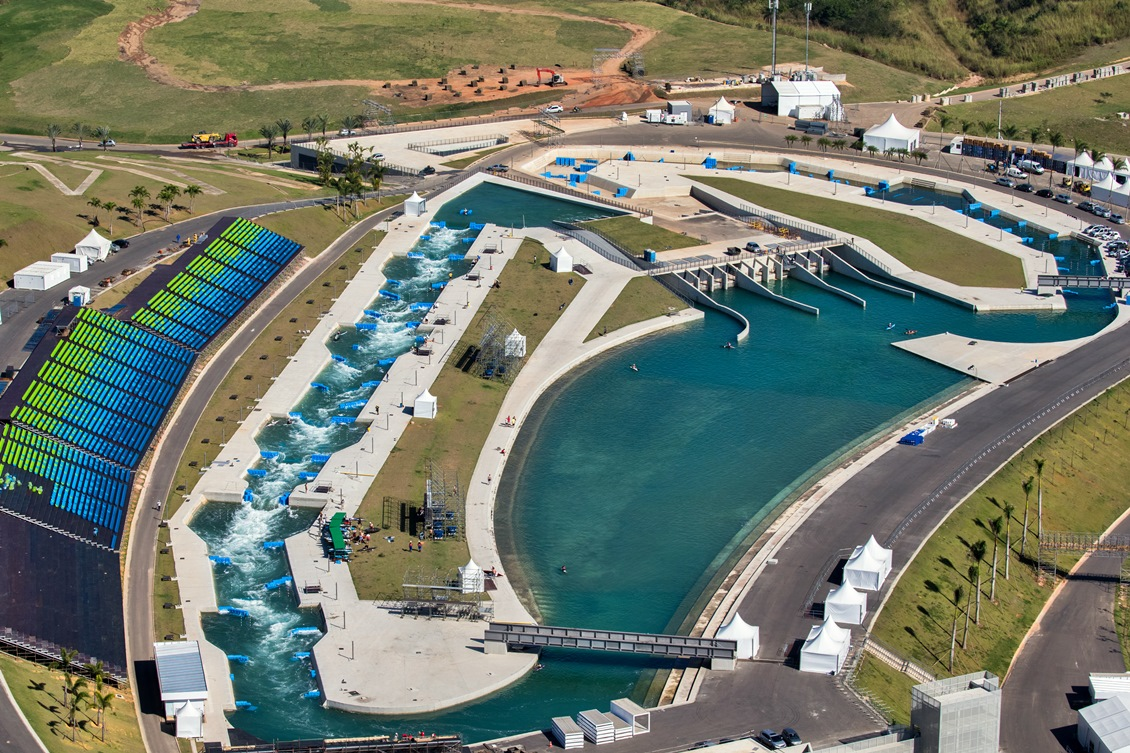
- Olympic Whitewater Stadium

About
- Locale: Rio de Janeiro, Brazil
- Managing agent: 2016 Rio de Janeiro Olympic Games
- Designer: Whitewater Parks International; Vigliecca & Associates
- Main shape: Two loops
- Adjustable: yes
- Pumped: Competition: 4 x 4.0 m^{3}/s (140 cu ft/s); Training: 3 x 3.5 m^{3}/s (120 cu ft/s)
- Lighting: yes
- Canoe lift: yes
- Opening date: 2015 (cost $45 million)

Stats
- Length: Competition: 250 metres (820 ft); Training: 200 metres (656 ft)
- Drop: Competition: 4.5 metres (14.8 ft); Training: 2.0 metres (7 ft)
- Slope: Competition: 1.8% (95 ft/mi); Training: 1.0% (53 ft/mi)
- Flowrate: Competition: 12.0 m^{3}/s (420 cu ft/s); Training: 10.5 m^{3}/s (370 cu ft/s)

The Deodoro Olympic Whitewater Stadium is a whitewater paddling venue, constructed to host the canoeing and kayaking slalom events for the 2016 Summer Olympics in Rio de Janeiro. The stadium is part of the 'X-Park' sport complex (which includes BMX and Mountain Bike) located in Deodoro, Rio de Janeiro, Brazil. After the Olympics, the venue became a public swimming pool that also holds high-performance training and competitions.

Plan view of the pump-powered canoe slalom venue for the 2016 Olympic Games.

Slalom gate positions for 2016 Olympic Heats, 7 August.

Slalom gate positions for 2016 Olympic Semi-Finals and Finals, 9 August.

Results of Olympic competition: C-1 men, C-2 men, K-1 men, K-1 women.
