= Phoebe Spicer =

British slalom canoeist

Personal information
- Nationality: British
- Born: 2000 (age 25–26) Welwyn Garden City, England

Sport
- Country: Great Britain
- Sport: Canoe slalom
- Event: C1, K1, Kayak cross
Medal record
Women's canoe slalom
Representing Great Britain
World Championships
Bronze medal – third place	2023 London	K1 team
U23 World Championships
Gold medal – first place	2023 Kraków	K1 team
U23 European Championships
Silver medal – second place	2021 Solkan	K1 team
Bronze medal – third place	2022 České Budějovice	K1 team

Phoebe Spicer (born 2000) is a British slalom canoeist who has competed at the international level since 2017.

She won a bronze medal in the K1 team event at the 2023 World Championships in London.
