= Canoeing at the 2020 Summer Olympics – Women's slalom K-1 =

Olympic canoeing event

Women's slalom K-1 at the Games of the XXXII Olympiad
- Venue: Kasai Canoe Slalom Course
- Dates: 25 July 2021 (heats); 27 July 2021 (semifinal & final)
- Competitors: 27 from 27 nations

Medalists
1st place, gold medalist(s)		Ricarda Funk	Germany
2nd place, silver medalist(s)		Maialen Chourraut	Spain
3rd place, bronze medalist(s)		Jessica Fox	Australia

The women's K-1 slalom canoeing event at the 2020 Summer Olympics took place on 25 and 27 July 2021 at the Kasai Canoe Slalom Course. 27 canoeists from 27 nations competed.

== Background ==
This was the ninth appearance of the event, having previously appeared in every Summer Olympics with slalom canoeing: 1972 and 1992 to 2016.

Reigning Olympic champion Maialen Chourraut of Spain made her fourth Olympic appearance (she also took bronze in 2012), attempting to defend her title. Reigning World Champion Eva Terčelj of Slovenia also competed as a medal hopeful. She placed 13th in 2012.

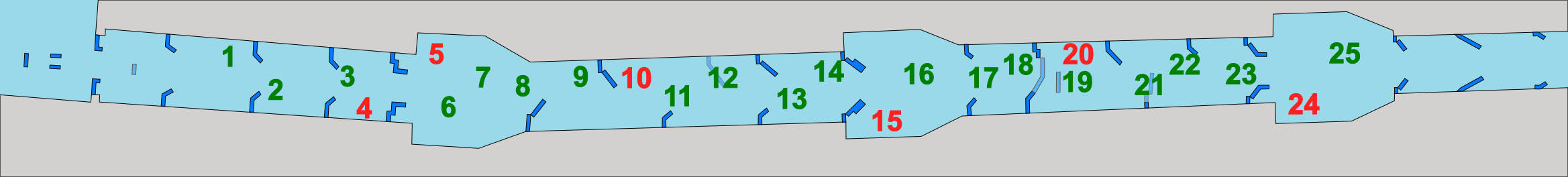
Slalom gate positions for Heats, Tokyo Olympics, 25 July 2021

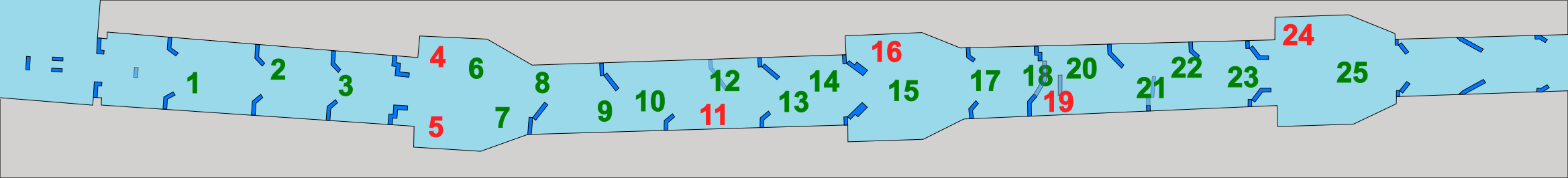
Slalom gate positions for Semifinals and Finals, Tokyo Olympics, 27 July 2021

== Qualification ==
A National Olympic Committee (NOC) could enter only 1 qualified canoeist in the women's slalom K-1 event. A total of 24 qualification places were available, allocated as follows:

- 1 place for the host nation, Japan
- 18 places awarded through the 2019 ICF Canoe Slalom World Championships
- 5 places awarded through continental tournaments, 1 per continent

Three additional athletes competed, having already earned a quota in the Women's C1 event.

Qualifying places were awarded to the NOC, not to the individual canoeist who earned the place.

The World Championships quota places were allocated as follows:

Rank	Canoeist	Nation	Qualification	Selected competitor
1	Eva Terčelj	Slovenia	1st placed NOC	Eva Terčelj
2	Jessica Fox	Australia	Earned quota in C1	Jessica Fox
3	Luuka Jones	New Zealand	2nd placed NOC	Luuka Jones
4	Kateřina Minařík Kudějová	Czech Republic	3rd placed NOC	Kateřina Minařík Kudějová
5	Ricarda Funk	Germany	4th placed NOC	Ricarda Funk
6	Kimberley Woods	Great Britain	5th placed NOC	Kimberley Woods
7	Stefanie Horn	Italy	6th placed NOC	Stefanie Horn
9	Ana Sátila	Brazil	Earned quota in C1	Ana Sátila
10	Maialen Chourraut	Spain	7th placed NOC	Maialen Chourraut
12	Camille Prigent	France	8th placed NOC	Marie-Zélia Lafont
14	Viktoriia Us	Ukraine	9th placed NOC	Viktoriia Us
16	Corinna Kuhnle	Austria	10th placed NOC	Viktoria Wolffhardt
18	Aki Yazawa	Japan	11th placed NOC	Aki Yazawa
21	Evy Leibfarth	United States	Earned quota in C1	Evy Leibfarth
22	Eliška Mintálová	Slovakia	12th placed NOC	Eliška Mintálová
23	Natalia Pacierpnik	Poland	13th placed NOC	Klaudia Zwolińska
27	Lena Teunissen	Netherlands	14th placed NOC	Martina Wegman
30	Mònica Dòria	Andorra	15th placed NOC	Mònica Dòria
39	Jane Nicholas	Cook Islands	16th placed NOC	Jane Nicholas
40	Florence Maheu	Canada	17th placed NOC	Florence Maheu
41	Xu Yanru	China	18th placed NOC	Li Tong

Continental and other places:

Nation	Canoeist	Qualification	Selected competitor
Kazakhstan	Yekaterina Smirnova	Asia quota	Yekaterina Smirnova
Morocco	Célia Jodar	Africa quota	Célia Jodar
Mexico	Sofía Reinoso	Americas quota^{[a]}	Sofía Reinoso
Switzerland	Naemi Brändle	Europe quota	Naemi Brändle
ROC	-	Reallocation of Host quota	Alsu Minazova
Chinese Taipei	-	Reallocation of Oceania quota	Chang Chu-han

Notes
^{a} The quota for the Americas was allocated to the NOC with the highest-ranked eligible athlete, due to the cancellation of the 2021 Pan American Championships.

== Competition format ==
Slalom canoeing uses a three-round format, with heats, semifinal, and final. In the heats, each canoeist had two runs at the course with the better time counting. The top 24 advanced to the semifinal. In the semifinal, the canoeists get a single run; the top 10 advanced to the final. The best time in the single-run final wins gold.

The canoe course was approximately 250 metres (820 ft) long, with up to 25 gates that the canoeist had to pass in the correct direction. Penalty time was added for infractions such as passing on the wrong side or touching a gate. Runs typically lasted approximately 95 seconds.

== Schedule ==
All times were Japan Standard Time (UTC+9)

The women's slalom K-1 took place over two separate days.

Date	Time	Round
Sunday, 25 July 2021	13:00	Heats
Tuesday, 27 July 2021	14:00	Semifinal; Final

== Results ==
Rank	Bib	Canoeist	Nation	Preliminary heats						Semifinal			Final		
Rank	Bib	Canoeist	Nation	1st Ride	Pen.	2nd Ride	Pen.	Best	Order	Time	Pen.	Order	Time	Pen.	Order
1st place, gold medalist(s)	2	Ricarda Funk	Germany	101.90	2	101.56	0	101.56	2	107.96	4	3	105.50	0	1
2nd place, silver medalist(s)	5	Maialen Chourraut	Spain	108.25	2	105.13	0	105.13	5	109.92	2	7	106.63	0	2
3rd place, bronze medalist(s)	1	Jessica Fox	Australia	104.05	0	98.46	0	98.46	1	105.85	2	1	106.73	4	3
4	4	Stefanie Horn	Italy	109.82	2	104.79	0	104.79	4	108.52	0	4	106.93	2	4
5	13	Klaudia Zwolińska	Poland	108.97	2	110.46	0	108.97	10	111.76	0	10	108.98	4	5
6	6	Luuka Jones	New Zealand	110.22	4	101.72	0	101.72	3	108.97	2	5	110.67	0	6
7	15	Martina Wegman	Netherlands	113.29	2	109.84	0	109.84	12	110.74	2	8	111.33	0	7
8	12	Viktoriia Us	Ukraine	120.09	2	113.99	4	113.99	17	111.53	2	9	111.85	0	8
9	14	Eliška Mintálová	Slovakia	107.67	2	117.55	10	107.67	8	107.18	0	2	158.36	50	9
10	10	Kimberley Woods	Great Britain	109.63	2	107.82	4	107.82	9	109.00	0	6	177.09	56	10
11	9	Viktoria Wolffhardt	Austria	114.63	0	112.28	0	112.28	16	112.11	0	11	did not advance		
12	16	Evy Leibfarth	United States	125.85	2	111.70	2	111.70	15	112.73	0	12	did not advance		
13	8	Ana Sátila	Brazil	108.22	2	106.82	0	106.82	7	114.62	0	13	did not advance		
14	11	Marie-Zélia Lafont	France	121.48	6	110.25	2	110.25	13	115.81	2	14	did not advance		
15	7	Kateřina Minařík Kudějová	Czech Republic	107.87	0	106.41	0	106.41	6	116.15	2	15	did not advance		
16	18	Mònica Dòria	Andorra	110.57	2	110.54	4	110.54	14	118.15	0	16	did not advance		
17	21	Alsu Minazova	ROC	120.60	2	115.39	4	115.39	20	120.66	4	17	did not advance		
18	23	Naemi Brändle	Switzerland	230.37	100	135.00	8	135.00	24	121.91	4	18	did not advance		
19	17	Aki Yazawa	Japan	129.87	8	127.91	6	127.91	22	124.73	0	19	did not advance		
20	19	Li Tong	China	117.27	2	114.36	2	114.36	19	130.86	4	20	did not advance		
21	24	Sofía Reinoso	Mexico	132.89	4	143.19	8	132.89	23	136.34	4	21	did not advance		
22	22	Jane Nicholas	Cook Islands	150.17	2	120.10	4	120.10	21	144.84	6	22	did not advance		
23	20	Florence Maheu	Canada	114.29	0	135.35	2	114.29	18	152.37	4	23	did not advance		
24	3	Eva Terčelj	Slovenia	115.93	8	109.11	2	109.11	11	162.48	50	24	did not advance		
25	27	Yekaterina Smirnova	Kazakhstan	180.46	52	135.25	6	135.25	25	did not advance					
26	25	Chang Chu-han	Chinese Taipei	182.95	56	136.66	8	136.66	26	did not advance					
27	26	Célia Jodar	Morocco	171.38	14	258.46	108	171.38	27	did not advance					
