= Florence Maheu =

Canadian slalom canoeist (born 1993)

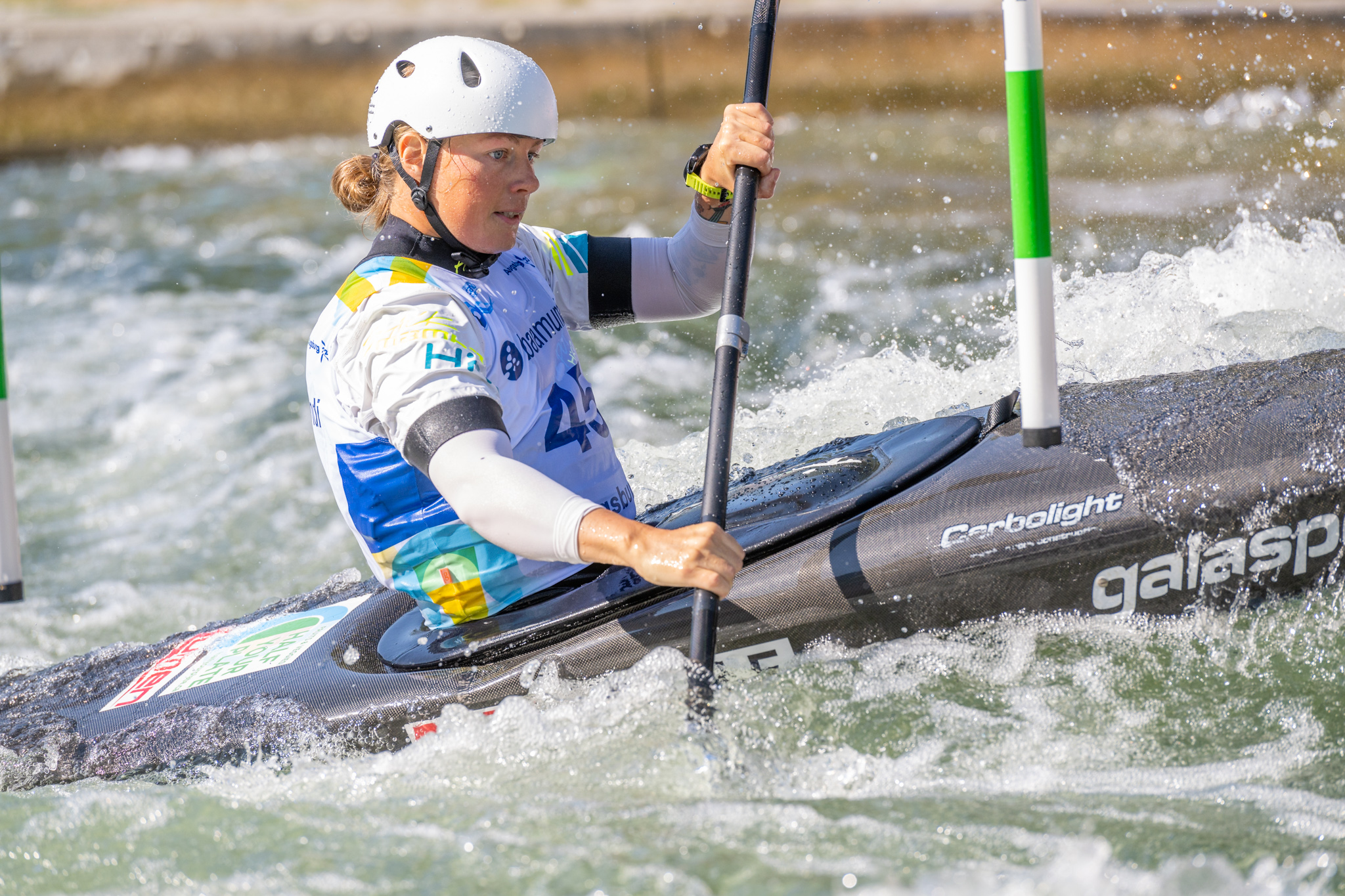
- Florence Maheu performing at 2022 ICF Canoe Slalom World Championships in Augsburg, Germany

Personal information
- Nickname: Flo
- Nationality: Canadian
- Born: 6 March 1993 Salaberry-de-Valleyfield, Quebec, Canada
- Home town: Salaberry-de-Valleyfield

Sport
- Country: Canada
- Sport: Canoe slalom
- Event: K1
- Club: Kayak Valleyfield
- Coached by: Anthony Colin & Michał Staniszewski
Medal record
Women's canoe slalom
Representing Canada

Florence Maheu (born 6 March 1993) is a Canadian slalom canoeist who has competed at the international level since 2012. She is from Salaberry-de-Valleyfield, Quebec and trains with Kayak Valleyfield.

Maheu represented Canada for the first time at the 2012 U23 World Championships in Wausau, where she finished 21st individually and 5th in the team event. She would compete at the U23 Worlds four more times from 2013 to 2016. In 2017 she won her first national title and finished as top Canadian at her first Senior World Championships in Pau. She finished in a career-best 13th place at the 2018 World Cup in Liptovský Mikuláš.

At the 2019 World Championships, Maheu's placement clinched a spot for Canada in the women's K1 at the 2020 Tokyo Olympics. She secured that spot for herself during the Australian Canoe Slalom Championships in January 2020 after finishing atop the rankings for the domestic selection process. She finished 23rd in the 2020 Olympic K1 event after being eliminated in the semifinal.

Florence has studied a Bachelor of Kinesiology at Université de Montréal. She is coached by Anthony Colin and 1995 C2 world champion Michał Staniszewski.

== Career ==
=== 2023 Season ===
In June 2023, Maheu was named to her first Pan American Games team.
