= Sofía Reinoso =

Mexican slalom canoeist

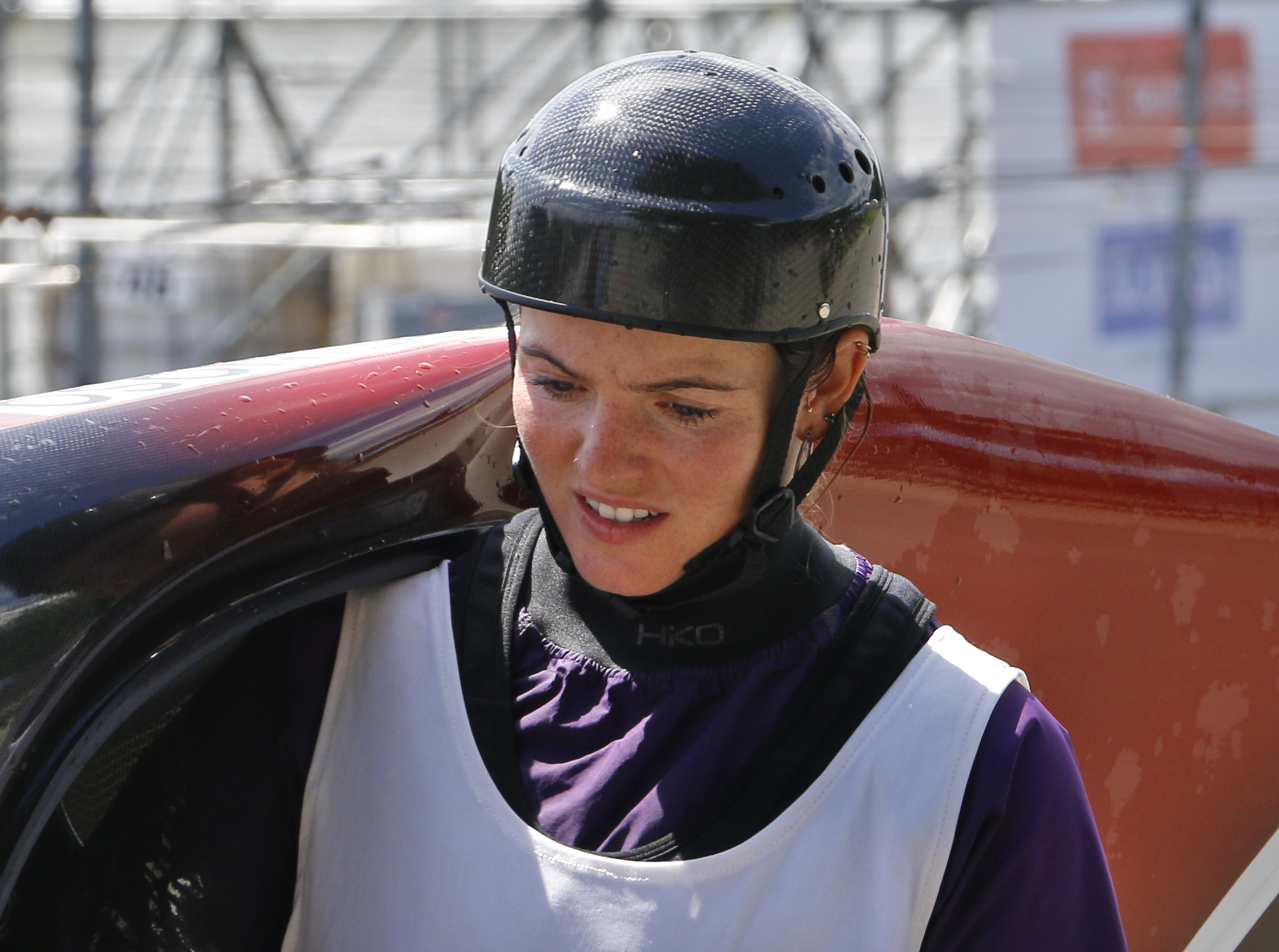

Personal information
- National team: Mexico
- Born: 23 October 1996 (age 29) Puebla
- Home town: Tlapacoyan

Sport
- Country: Mexico
- Sport: Canoe slalom
- Event: K1, Kayak cross
- Coached by: Silvan Poberaj
Medal record
Women's canoe slalom
Representing Mexico
Pan American Games
| Bronze medal – third place | 2019 Lima | K1 |
| Bronze medal – third place | 2019 Lima | Kayak cross |

Sofía Reinoso (born 23 October 1996) is a Mexican slalom canoeist who has competed at the international level since 2013, specializing in K1 and kayak cross. She lives in Tlapacoyan, Mexico and is coached by Silvan Poberaj.

== Career ==
Reinoso won bronze medals in the K1 and kayak cross events at the 2019 Pan American Games held in Lima, Peru. By doing this she became the first slalom paddler representing Mexico to win a medal at the Pan American Games. In 2015, she competed in the K1 event at the 2015 Pan American Games without winning a medal.

In 2020, Reinoso won a bronze medal in kayak cross at the 2020 Canoe Slalom World Cup in Pau, the first canoe slalom medal for Mexico at an ICF event. She earned her best senior world championship result of 22nd in kayak cross at the 2018 event in Rio de Janeiro.

Mexico was allocated the Pan American Olympic quota for women's K1 following the cancellation of the continental championships, with it allocated to the NOC with the highest-ranked eligible athlete. Reinoso represented Mexico in the K1 event at the delayed 2020 Summer Olympics in Tokyo, where she finished 21st after being eliminated in the semifinal.

She also competed at the 2024 Summer Olympics, finishing 25th in the K1 event and 28th in kayak cross.

== World Cup individual podiums ==
| Season | Date | Venue | Position | Event |
|---|---|---|---|---|
| 2020 | 7 November 2020 | Pau | 3rd | Kayak cross |
