= Laia Sorribes =

Spanish slalom canoeist

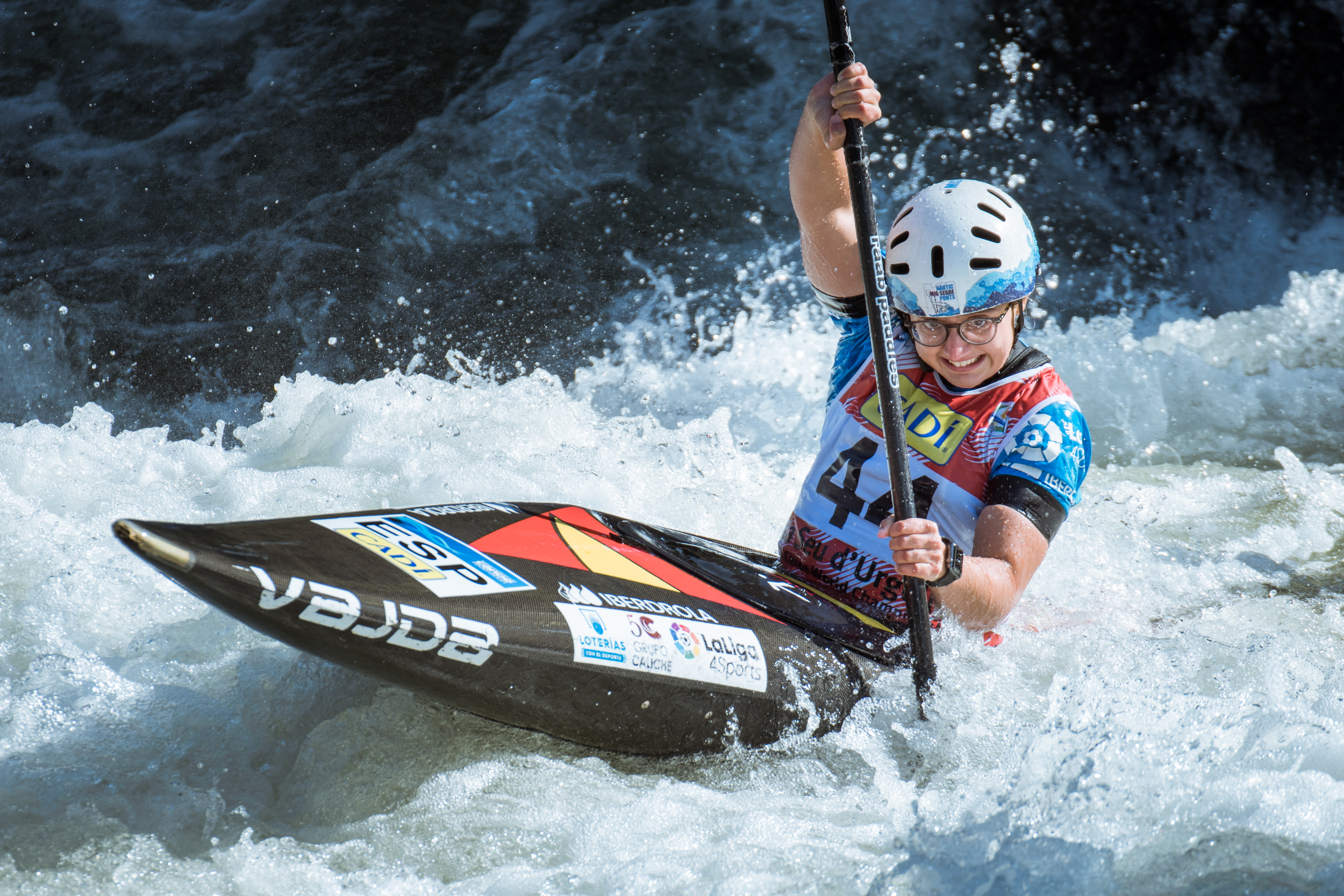
- 2019 ICF Canoe slalom World Championships by Antoine Lamielle

Personal information
- Born: 1999 (age 26–27)

Sport
- Country: Spain
- Sport: Canoe slalom
- Event(s): K1, Kayak cross, C2 mixed
Medal record
Women's canoe slalom
Representing Spain
World Championships
Silver medal – second place	2023 London	K1 team
European Championships
Silver medal – second place	2025 Vaires-sur-Marne	K1 team
U23 European Championships
Bronze medal – third place	2016 Solkan	K1 team
Junior World Championships
Silver medal – second place	2016 Kraków	K1
Junior European Championships
Gold medal – first place	2017 Hohenlimburg	K1
Bronze medal – third place	2016 Solkan	K1

Laia Sorribes (born 1999) is a Spanish slalom canoeist who has competed at the international level since 2016.

She won a silver medal in the K1 team event at the 2023 World Championships in London. She also won a silver medal in the K1 team event at the 2025 European Championships in Vaires-sur-Marne.
