= Maialen Chourraut =

Spanish slalom canoeist (born 1983)

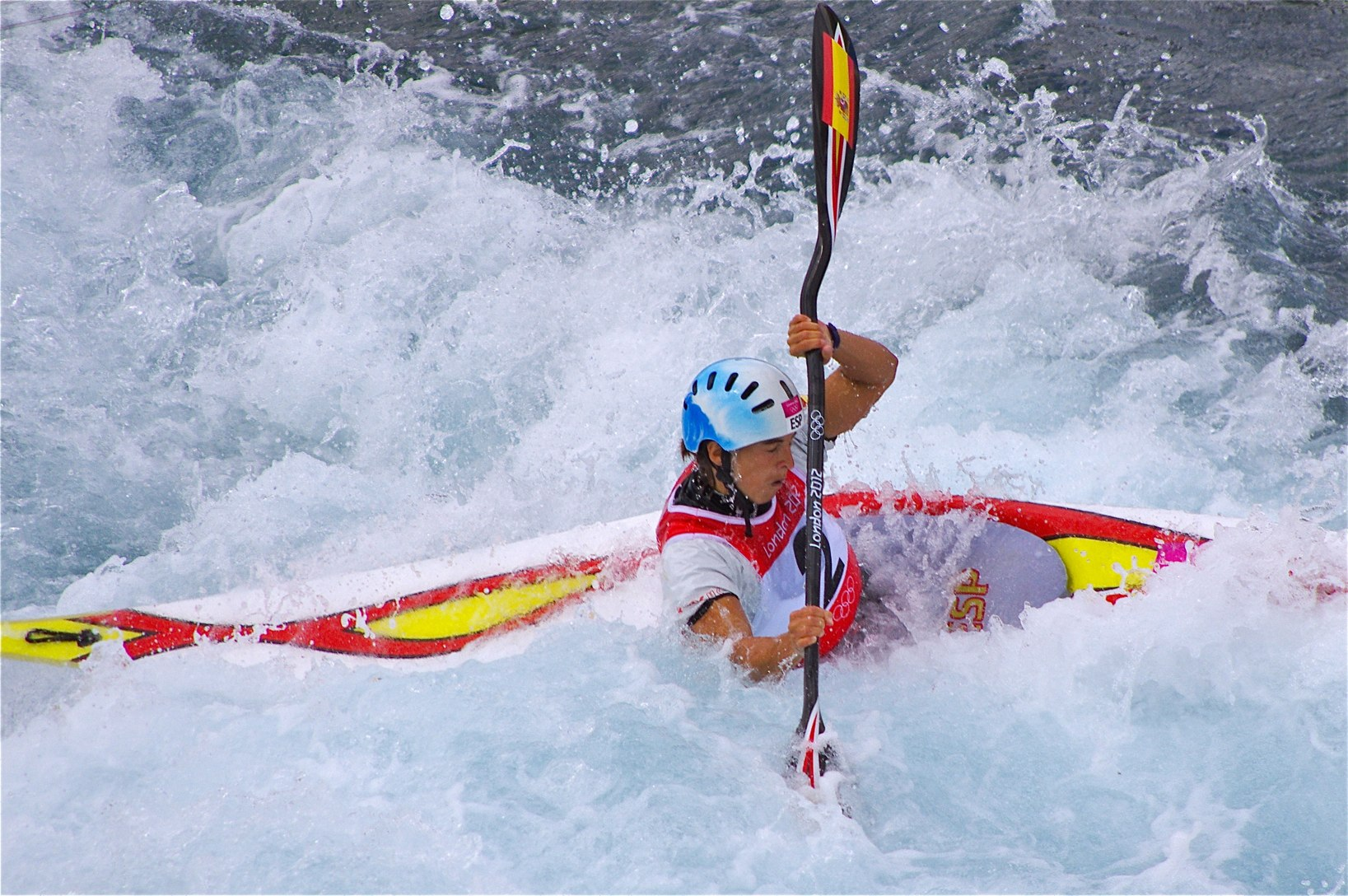
- Chourraut at the 2012 Summer Olympics

Personal information
- Full name: Maialen Chourraut Yurramendi
- Born: 8 March 1983 (age 43) Lasarte-Oria, Basque Country, Spain
- Height: 161 cm (5 ft 3 in)
- Weight: 55 kg (121 lb)

Sport
- Country: Spain
- Sport: Canoe slalom
- Event: K1, Kayak cross
- Club: Club Atlético San Sebastián
Medal record
Women's canoe slalom
Representing Spain
Olympic Games
Gold medal – first place	2016 Rio de Janeiro	K1
Silver medal – second place	2020 Tokyo	K1
Bronze medal – third place	2012 London	K1
World Championships
Silver medal – second place	2009 La Seu d'Urgell	K1
Silver medal – second place	2023 London	K1 team
Bronze medal – third place	2011 Bratislava	K1
European Championships
Gold medal – first place	2015 Markkleeberg	K1
Silver medal – second place	2014 Vienna	K1 team
Silver medal – second place	2017 Tacen	K1 team
Silver medal – second place	2025 Vaires-sur-Marne	K1 team
U23 European Championships
Silver medal – second place	2004 Kraków	K1

Maialen Chourraut Yurramendi (born 8 March 1983) is a Spanish slalom canoeist who has competed at the international level since 2000, specializing in K1 and in later years also in kayak cross.

Chourraut has a full set of Olympic medals from a total of five Olympic participations. She won the gold medal in the K1 event at the 2016 Summer Olympics in Rio de Janeiro. She went on to win a silver medal in the K1 event at the 2020 Summer Olympics in Tokyo. Previously she won a bronze medal in the K1 event at the 2012 Summer Olympics in London.

She also competed in the K1 event at the 2008 Summer Olympics in Beijing, but was eliminated in the heats and finished in 16th place. At the 2024 Summer Olympics in Paris, she finished 12th in both the K1 event and kayak cross.

Chourraut won two individual medals in the K1 event at the ICF Canoe Slalom World Championships with a silver in 2009 and a bronze in 2011. She also won a silver in the K1 team event in 2023. Chourraut won four medals at the European Championships (1 gold and 3 silvers).

The Spanish Olympic Committee, chose Chourraut and the Olympic canoeist Marcus Cooper as the Spanish flag bearers at the 2024 Paris Olympics opening ceremony on the River Seine. Chourraut turned it down as she was competing the next day in the K1 slalom. The sailor Tamara Echegoyen was competing at her fourth Olympics and she was chosen to replace her as she had the next most outstanding record.

== World Cup individual podiums ==
	1st place, gold medalist(s)	2nd place, silver medalist(s)	3rd place, bronze medalist(s)	Total
K1	8	5	4	17
Kayak cross	0	0	1	1
Total	8	5	5	18

Season	Date	Venue	Position	Event
2010	27 June 2010	La Seu d'Urgell	1st	K1
2011	3 July 2011	L'Argentière-la-Bessée	2nd	K1
2011	10 July 2011	Markkleeberg	3rd	K1
2012	10 June 2012	Cardiff	1st	K1
2012	17 June 2012	Pau	1st	K1
2014	3 August 2014	La Seu d'Urgell	1st	K1
2015	28 June 2015	Kraków	1st	K1
2015	5 July 2015	Liptovský Mikuláš	2nd	K1
2015	9 August 2015	La Seu d'Urgell	2nd	K1
2016	12 June 2016	La Seu d'Urgell	1st	K1
2016	19 June 2016	Pau	3rd	K1
2017	18 June 2017	Prague	1st	K1
2017	10 September 2017	La Seu d'Urgell	3rd	K1
2018	8 September 2018	La Seu d'Urgell	2nd	K1
2024	14 June 2024	Kraków	2nd	K1
2024	20 September 2024	La Seu d'Urgell	1st	K1
2025	15 June 2025	Pau	3rd	Kayak cross
2026	29 May 2026	Tacen	3rd	K1

== Notes ==
Awards
Preceded by Ruth Beitia	Spanish Sportswoman of the Year; 2016 (tied with Lydia Valentín)	Succeeded by Sandra Sánchez
