= Li Tong (canoeist) =

Chinese kayaker (born 1988)

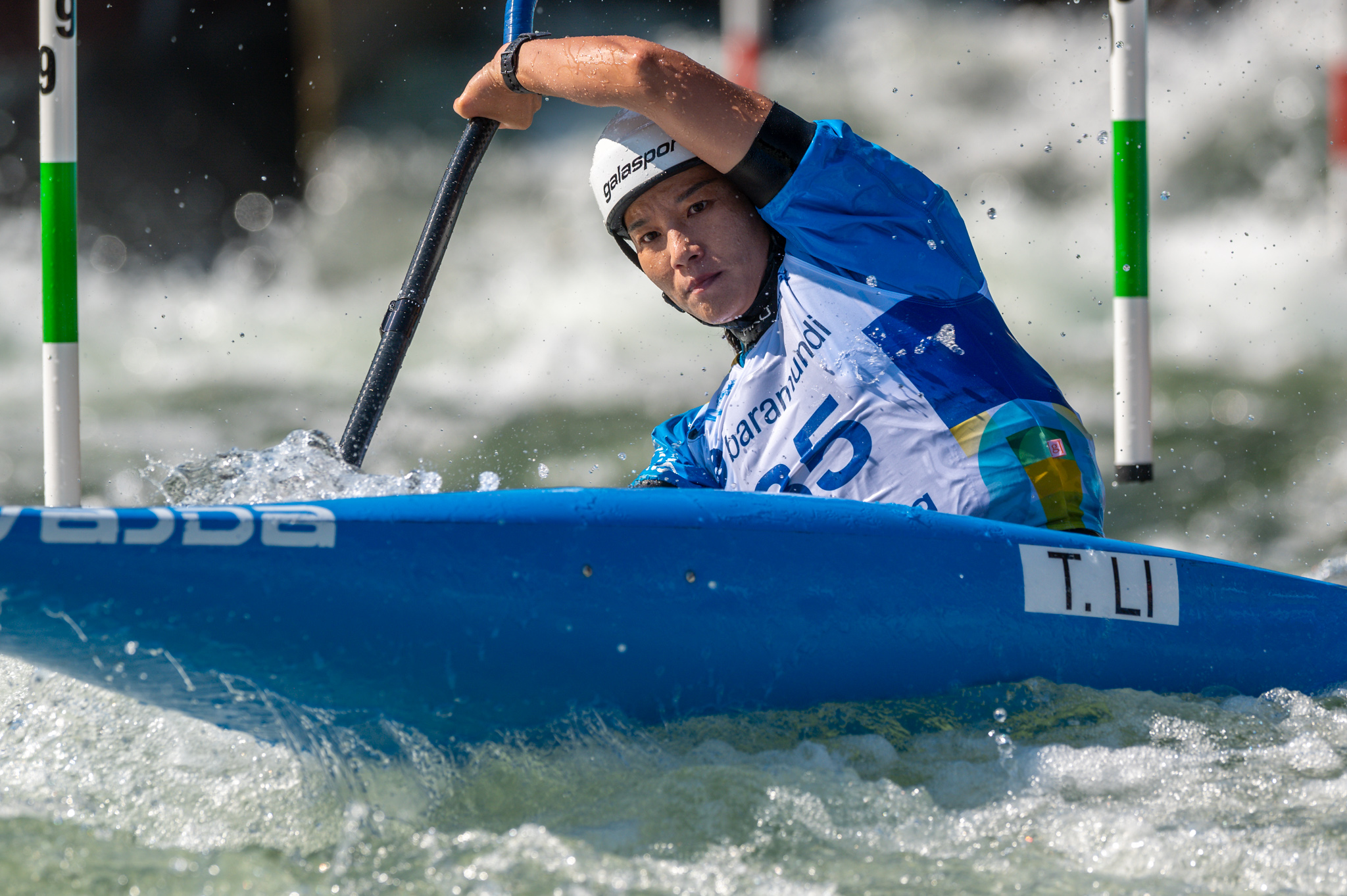
- Tong Li performing at 2022 ICF Canoe Slalom World Championships in Augsburg, Germany

Personal information
- Nationality: Chinese
- Born: 8 October 1988 Rugao, Jiangsu

Sport
- Country: China
- Sport: Canoe slalom
- Event: K1
Medal record
Women's canoe slalom
Representing China
Asian Games
Gold medal – first place	2014 Incheon	K1
Silver medal – second place	2018 Jakarta	K1
Asian Championships
Gold medal – first place	2017 Nakhon Nayok	K1 team
Silver medal – second place	2017 Nakhon Nayok	K1

Li Tong (Chinese: 李彤; pinyin: Lǐ Tóng; born 8 October 1988) is a Chinese slalom canoeist who has competed at the international level since 2006.

She won a gold medal in the K1 event at the 2014 Asian Games in Incheon, and a silver in the same event in 2018 near Jakarta. Tong finished in 5th place in the K1 team event at the 2018 World Championships in Rio. She earned her best senior world championship result, of 12th, at the 2015 World Championships in Lee Valley.

Li competed at the 2020 Summer Olympics in Tokyo, after China secured a quota as the 18th placed NOC at the 2019 World Championships. She finished 20th in the K1 event after being eliminated in the semifinal.

== World Cup individual podiums ==
Season	Date	Venue	Position	Event
2006	27 Aug 2006	Zhangjiajie	1st	K1^{1}
2008	16 Mar 2008	Penrith	2nd	K1^{2}
2008	18 May 2008	Nakhon Nayok	1st	K1^{1}

^{1} Asia Canoe Slalom Championship counting for World Cup points
^{2} Oceania Championship counting for World Cup points
