= Chang Chu-han =

Taiwanese canoeist

Chang Chu-Han
Personal information
- Nationality: Taiwanese
- Born: 1 March 1993 (age 33) Taichung
- Height: 166 cm (5 ft 5 in)
- Weight: 62 kg (137 lb)

Sport
- Country: Taiwan
- Sport: Canoe slalom
- Event: K1, Kayak cross
Medal record
Women's canoe slalom
Representing Chinese Taipei
Asian Games
Gold medal – first place	2022 Hangzhou	K1
Silver medal – second place	2014 Incheon	K1
Bronze medal – third place	2018 Jakarta	K1
Asian Championships
Silver medal – second place	2010 Xiasi	K1 team
Silver medal – second place	2013 Shuili	K1
Silver medal – second place	2013 Shuili	K1 team
Silver medal – second place	2017 Nakhon Nayok	K1 team
Bronze medal – third place	2016 Toyama	K1 team

Chang Chu-Han (Chinese: 張筑涵; pinyin: Zhāng Chǔ Hán; Wade–Giles: Chang Chu-han; born 1 March 1993) is a Taiwanese slalom canoeist who has competed at the international level since 2008. She is from Taichung and has studied at National Taichung University of Education.

== Career ==
Chu-Han won a gold (2022), a silver (2014) and a bronze medal (2018) in the K1 event at the Asian Games. She has also won five medals at the Asian Canoeing Championships. Chang finished in 33rd place at the 2014 U23 World Championships in Penrith.

She finished 46th in the K1 event at the 2019 World Championships in La Seu d'Urgell. As there were no eligible athletes left for the Oceania quota, it was reallocated to Chinese Taipei, as the 19th-ranked eligible NOC at the worlds. Chu-Han competed in the K1 event at the 2020 Summer Olympics in Tokyo, where she finished 26th after being eliminated in the heats.

She also competed at the 2024 Summer Olympics in Paris, finishing 23rd in the K1 event and 30th in kayak cross.
