= Li Lu (canoeist) =

Chinese canoeist

Personal information
- Native name: 李
- Nationality: Chinese
- Born: 18 February 1992 (age 34) Panzhihua, Sichuan
- Height: 1.60 m (5 ft 3 in)
- Weight: 55 kg (121 lb)

Sport
- Country: China
- Sport: Canoe slalom
- Event: K1, C1
- Club: Sichuan Province
- Coached by: Liu Xiaoqin
Medal record
Women's canoe slalom
Representing China
Asian Championships
Gold medal – first place	2016 Toyama	K1
World U23 Championships
Silver medal – second place	2014 Penrith	K1

Li Lu (Chinese: 李露; born 18 February 1992 in Panzhihua, Sichuan) is a Chinese slalom canoeist who competed at the international level from 2009 to 2016.

She finished in 13th place in the K1 event at the 2016 Summer Olympics in Rio de Janeiro.

== World Cup individual podiums ==
Season	Date	Venue	Position	Event
2014	8 Jun 2014	Lee Valley	1st	K1
