= Aki Yazawa =

Japanese kayaker (born 1991)

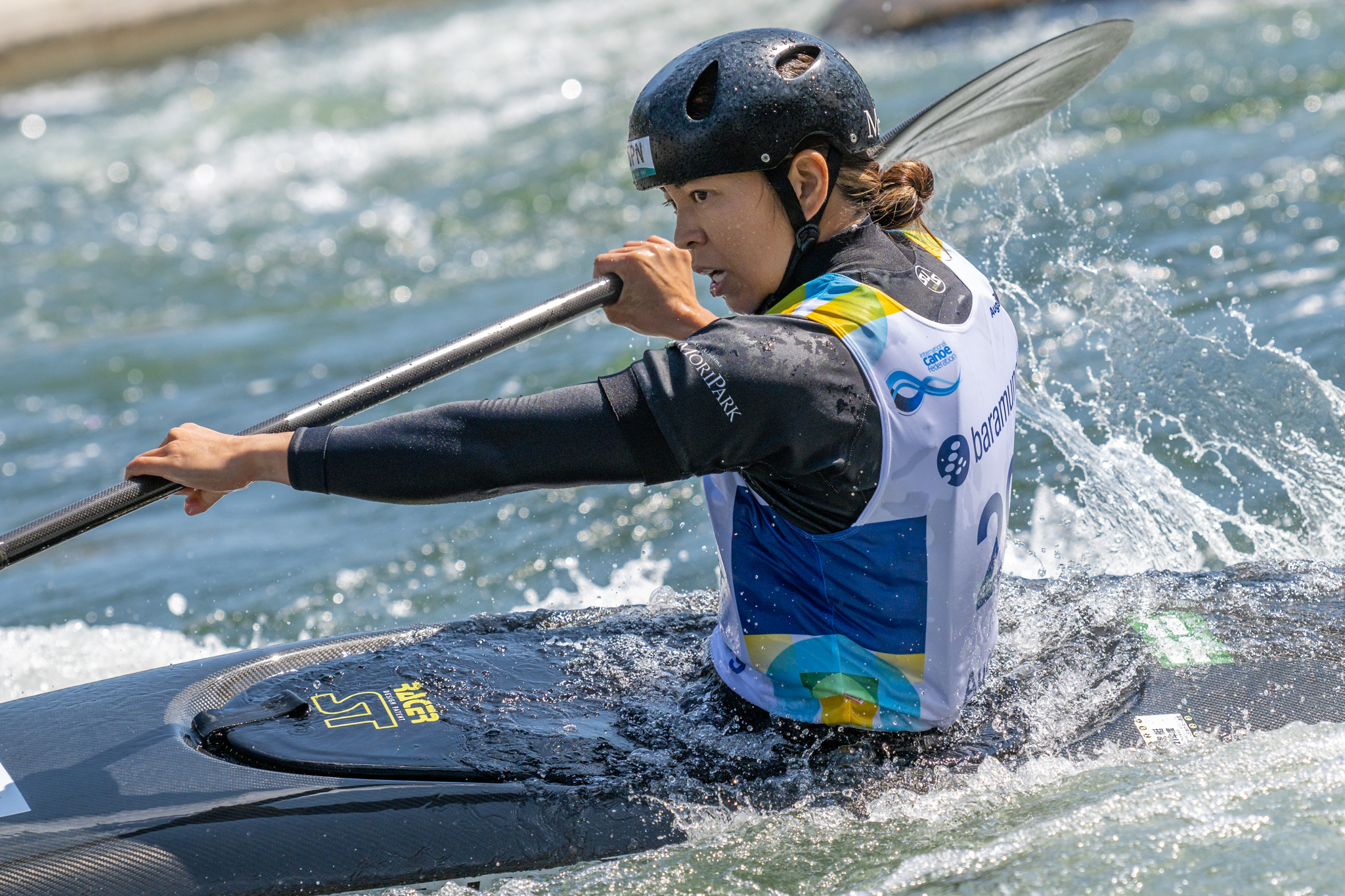
- Aki Yazawa performing at 2022 ICF Canoe Slalom World Championships in Augsburg, Germany

Personal information
- Nationality: Japan
- Born: 5 November 1991 (age 34) Iida, Nagano, Japan

Sport
- Country: Japan
- Sport: Canoe slalom
- Events: K1, Kayak cross, C1
Medal record
Women's canoe slalom
Representing Japan
Asian Games
Gold medal – first place	2018 Jakarta	K1
Bronze medal – third place	2014 Icheon	K1
Asian Championships
Silver medal – second place	2010 Xiasi	K1

Aki Yazawa (矢澤 亜希, Yazawa Aki; born November 5, 1991) is a Japanese slalom canoeist who has competed at the international level since 2006.

Yazawa participed in three Olympic Games. She finished in 20th place in the K1 event at the 2016 Summer Olympics in Rio de Janeiro. She represented the host nation at the delayed 2020 Summer Olympics in Tokyo where she finished 19th in the K1 event after being eliminated in the semifinal. She also competed at the 2024 Summer Olympics, finishing 17th in the K1 event and 36th in kayak cross.

Her brother Kazuki Yazawa is also an Olympic slalom canoeist.

== World Cup individual podiums ==
Season	Date	Venue	Position	Event
2010	2 May 2010	Xiasi	3rd	K1^{1}

^{1} Asian Canoe Slalom Championship counting for World Cup points
