= Kurumi Ito =

Japanese canoe slalom athlete

Personal information
- Nationality: Japanese
- Born: 25 September 2001 (age 25)
- Education: Waseda University

Sport
- Sport: Canoe slalom
Medal record
Representing Japan
Asian Games
Gold medal – first place	2026 Aichi-Nagoya	Women's K-1

Kurumi Ito (Japanese: 伊藤 くるみ, born 25 September 2001) is a Japanese canoe slalom athlete. She won the gold medal in the women's kayak single (K-1) event at the 2026 Asian Games in Aichi-Nagoya, Japan.

== Career ==
Ito attended Waseda University and has been affiliated with the Ome Canoe Association and Kyokuyo Co., Ltd. She represented Japan in canoe slalom at the 2022 Asian Games, held in Hangzhou in 2023, but did not complete the final of the women's kayak single event.

At the 2026 Asian Games, Ito competed in the women's kayak single event. She qualified for the final after recording the fastest time in the semi-final, finishing in 103.84 seconds. In the final, she recorded a score of 107.60 to win the gold medal, ahead of Chen Lin of China and Yekaterina Tarantseva of Kazakhstan.
