= 2021 ICF Canoe Slalom World Championships – Men's K1 =

World championship canoeing event

Men's K1 at the 2021 ICF Canoe Slalom World Championships
- Venue: Čunovo Water Sports Centre
- Location: Bratislava, Slovakia
- Dates: 23–25 September 2021
- Competitors: 80 from 36 nations

Medalists
gold medal	Boris Neveu	France
silver medal	Marcello Beda	Italy
bronze medal	Joan Crespo	Spain

The Men's K1 at the 2021 ICF Canoe Slalom World Championships took place on 23 and 25 September 2021 at the Čunovo Water Sports Centre in Bratislava. It was the 41st edition of the event, and 80 athletes from 36 nations competed.

The event was won by Boris Neveu of France, winning his second title, after he led a French one-two-three in 2014. Italian underdog Marcello Beda won silver in his first international final, while Joan Crespo matched his result from 2019 with bronze.

== Background ==
Czech Jiří Prskavec entered the event a clear favourite, as the reigning World Champion, Olympic Champion and World No. 1. The host nation Slovakia fielded Olympic silver medallist Jakub Grigar. Czech Vít Přindiš came into the event having won the last two World Cup rounds en route to the overall World Cup title, also winning the European Championships and the extreme overall World Cup title. World No. 3 Joe Clarke also entered as a favourite, and with something to prove after not qualifying for the Tokyo Olympics. Andrej Málek was the last athlete to win a major ICF race on the Bratislava course, winning the second round of the 2019 World Cup, but he did not take part after retiring in 2020.

== Competition format ==
The Men's K1 event in canoe slalom uses a three-round format with heats, a semifinal and final. Athletes complete up to two runs in the heats. In the first heat, the 30 fastest men qualify automatically for the semifinal, whilst the rest complete another run in the repêchage second heat for a further 10 qualification positions. The final rank of non-qualifying athletes is determined by their second run score. Athletes start in the reverse order of their heats position in the semifinal and complete a single run, with the top 10 advancing to the final. The athlete with the best time in the single-run final is awarded gold.

Penalties of 2 or 50 seconds are incurred for infractions such as missing a gate, touching a gate, or not negotiating gates in numerical order. A team may request up to one review of a penalty per boat in the heats or semifinals phases, with no enquiries considered in the finals.

== Schedule ==
All times are Central European Summer Time (UTC+2)

Date	Time	Round
Thursday, 23 September 2021
Thursday, 23 September 2021	10:03	Heats Run 1
Thursday, 23 September 2021	12:32	Heats Run 2
Saturday, 25 September 2021
Saturday, 25 September 2021	10:08	Semifinal
Saturday, 25 September 2021	12:40	Final

== Results ==
2014 World Champion Boris Neveu topped the first heat with a clean 82.14, a day after winning the Team world title, ahead of Czechs Vít Přindiš and Vavřinec Hradilek. Sergei Maimistov won the second heat representing the Russian Canoe Federation, 1.15 off Neveu's first run time. Joe Clarke and Slovak Martin Halčin were the two highest ranked athletes to miss out on the semifinal. With both Germans Noah Hegge and Stefan Hengst setting equal times of 85.95 in the first heats run to finish 30th, 41 athletes progressed to the semifinal. 34 of the 41 who progressed to the semifinal did so with a penalty-free run.

The semifinal was won by home favourite Jakub Grigar, with a time of 85.16, ahead of Hegge and Marcello Beda, both making their first World Championship final. After the nation won 4 of the last 6 World Championship titles in this event, no Czech athletes qualified for the final, making this the first final without Czech participation since 2014. By finishing 9th in the semifinal, Brazilian Pedro Gonçalves became the first South American to progress to the World Championships final in this event since Thomas Bersinger placed 4th in 2014. This also marked the first time since 1995 that all three German athletes made the final.

Neveu became the 2021 K1M World Champion with a clean run of 83.92, almost 4 seconds clear of silver medalist Beda, while Joan Crespo won bronze at a second consecutive World Championship. The standard in the final was such that 7 of the athletes would have won a medal, had they completed the course in the same time as their semifinal.

Penalties are included in the time shown. The fastest time in each round is shown in bold.

Rank	Bib	Canoeist	Nation	Heats						Semifinal			Final		
Rank	Bib	Canoeist	Nation	Run 1			Run 2			Semifinal			Final		
Rank	Bib	Canoeist	Nation	Time	Pen.	Order	Time	Pen.	Order	Time	Pen.	Order	Time	Pen.	Order
1st place, gold medalist(s)	6	Boris Neveu	France	**82.14**	0	1	-			87.12	2	6	**83.92**	0	1
2nd place, silver medalist(s)	33	Marcello Beda	Italy	85.74	0	27	-			86.82	0	3	87.75	0	2
3rd place, bronze medalist(s)	10	Joan Crespo	Spain	85.33	0	21	-			87.05	0	4	87.90	2	3
4	7	Giovanni De Gennaro	Italy	83.05	0	4	-			87.91	2	8	90.22	4	4
5	23	Stefan Hengst	Germany	85.95	2	30	-			88.66	2	10	90.68	2	5
6	30	Noah Hegge	Germany	85.95	0	30	-			86.25	0	2	91.18	4	6
7	12	Jakub Grigar	Slovakia	84.24	0	14	-			**85.16**	0	1	92.39	2	7
8	2	Peter Kauzer	Slovenia	83.20	0	5	-			87.47	4	7	136.10	52	8
9	5	Hannes Aigner	Germany	84.75	0	18	-			87.09	0	5	139.72	52	9
10	28	Pedro Gonçalves	Brazil	87.62	0	39	85.97	2	7	88.15	0	9	141.22	54	10
11	1	Jiří Prskavec	Czech Republic	84.87	0	19	-			88.71	0	11	did not advance		
12	9	Mathieu Biazizzo	France	86.57	2	34	86.67	0	9	88.81	2	12	did not advance		
13	22	Pavel Eigel	RCF	88.78	0	42	84.68	0	3	88.95	0	13	did not advance		
14	43	Adam Gonšenica	Slovakia	83.91	2	12	-			89.05	2	14	did not advance		
15	8	Lucien Delfour	Australia	85.38	2	22	-			89.07	2	15	did not advance		
16	21	Niko Testen	Slovenia	84.43	0	16	-			89.10	0	16	did not advance		
17	11	Dariusz Popiela	Poland	85.90	0	29	-			89.19	0	17	did not advance		
18	20	Lukas Werro	Switzerland	85.72	0	26	-			90.37	0	18	did not advance		
19	27	Benjamin Renia	France	83.23	0	6	-			91.19	4	19	did not advance		
20	37	Erik Holmer	Sweden	85.50	0	24	-			91.44	2	20	did not advance		
21	16	David Llorente	Spain	83.83	0	11	-			91.83	4	21	did not advance		
22	24	Isak Öhrström	Sweden	86.57	2	34	83.85	0	2	92.06	0	22	did not advance		
23	15	Bradley Forbes-Cryans	Great Britain	85.38	0	22	-			92.44	4	23	did not advance		
24	32	Mario Leitner	Austria	84.25	0	15	-			92.58	2	24	did not advance		
24	40	Mathieu Desnos	Brazil	141.44	50	73	85.38	0	6	92.58	6	24	did not advance		
26	17	Michal Smolen	United States	85.82	0	28	-			92.61	2	26	did not advance		
27	13	Felix Oschmautz	Austria	83.60	0	7	-			92.96	6	27	did not advance		
28	47	Sergei Maimistov	RCF	88.26	2	41	**83.29**	0	1	93.48	0	28	did not advance		
29	49	Gabriel De Coster	Belgium	84.73	2	17	-			93.78	2	29	did not advance		
30	39	Gelindo Chiarello	Switzerland	86.52	0	33	84.73	0	4	93.96	4	30	did not advance		
31	31	Finn Butcher	New Zealand	84.88	0	20	-			95.57	4	31	did not advance		
32	48	Nikita Gubenko	RCF	86.44	2	32	86.32	0	8	95.80	4	32	did not advance		
33	42	Pau Echaniz	Spain	83.78	0	10	-			98.27	8	33	did not advance		
34	36	Christian De Dionigi	Italy	87.03	2	37	84.82	0	5	99.52	6	34	did not advance		
35	14	Martin Dougoud	Switzerland	83.71	0	9	-			136.54	52	35	did not advance		
36	4	Vít Přindiš	Czech Republic	82.51	0	2	-			136.74	50	36	did not advance		
37	25	Christopher Bowers	Great Britain	84.19	0	13	-			138.21	50	37	did not advance		
38	19	Vavřinec Hradilek	Czech Republic	82.85	0	3	-			139.35	52	38	did not advance		
39	26	Martin Srabotnik	Slovenia	85.55	0	25	-			139.37	52	39	did not advance		
40	41	Rafał Polaczyk	Poland	92.15	2	51	87.23	0	10	142.68	54	40	did not advance		
41	29	Callum Gilbert	New Zealand	83.60	0	7	-			154.51	56	41	did not advance		
42	34	Krzysztof Majerczak	Poland	141.86	50	74	87.74	0	11	did not advance					
43	18	Martin Halčin	Slovakia	90.64	0	46	87.97	2	12	did not advance					
44	52	Alistair McCreery	Ireland	91.40	0	50	88.21	0	13	did not advance					
45	59	Jordan Sherman	United States	90.78	0	47	88.48	0	14	did not advance					
46	44	Fredrik Wahlén	Sweden	89.18	0	45	88.82	0	15	did not advance					
47	3	Joe Clarke	Great Britain	86.71	2	36	90.11	0	16	did not advance					
48	70	Djanibek Temirgaliev	Uzbekistan	91.04	0	48	90.29	0	17	did not advance					
49	35	Kazuya Adachi	Japan	87.22	2	38	91.61	0	18	did not advance					
50	58	Kaelin Friedenson	United States	96.17	6	53	92.16	0	19	did not advance					
51	53	Trevor Boyd	Canada	99.98	6	60	92.39	0	20	did not advance					
52	45	Guilherme Rodrigues	Brazil	89.13	0	44	93.11	2	21	did not advance					
53	50	Martin Stanovsky	Kazakhstan	96.94	2	55	95.93	2	22	did not advance					
54	51	Yusuke Muto	Japan	87.73	0	40	96.25	6	23	did not advance					
55	60	Angel Petrushev	North Macedonia	97.05	2	56	96.47	2	24	did not advance					
56	63	Milos Jevtic	Serbia	103.72	2	63	96.48	2	25	did not advance					
57	62	Moritz Kremslehner	Austria	94.58	2	52	96.84	0	26	did not advance					
58	46	Zack Mutton	New Zealand	88.82	0	43	97.33	2	27	did not advance					
59	71	Barkamol Mirzakhamdamov	Uzbekistan	96.88	2	54	99.73	2	28	did not advance					
60	55	Mael Rivard	Canada	103.99	2	64	101.33	0	29	did not advance					
61	77	Niek Hendriks	Netherlands	99.02	4	58	102.20	4	30	did not advance					
62	76	Donovan Wewege	South Africa	130.84	2	71	102.66	2	31	did not advance					
63	66	Ognjen Dimitrijevic	Serbia	165.87	56	78	102.71	0	32	did not advance					
64	78	Martins Plaudis	Latvia	114.96	4	66	103.99	0	33	did not advance					
65	64	Nour Ait Kaddour	Morocco	99.91	2	59	105.99	6	34	did not advance					
66	67	Marko Dordevic	Serbia	98.59	2	57	110.25	0	35	did not advance					
67	61	Gustas Malakauskas	Lithuania	103.12	4	61	110.57	0	36	did not advance					
68	56	Jean-Benoit Lemay	Canada	148.48	52	75	110.99	8	37	did not advance					
69	75	Vejas Pranskunas	Lithuania	121.38	6	69	115.14	6	38	did not advance					
70	54	Andraz Echeverria Olguin	Chile	103.70	6	62	124.87	2	39	did not advance					
71	69	Ricardo Fentanes	Mexico	132.83	6	72	129.01	4	40	did not advance					
72	79	Patrick Kozma	Romania	358.59	204	79	129.05	4	41	did not advance					
73	38	Igor Tsviet	Ukraine	91.21	2	49	135.47	50	42	did not advance					
74	74	Alexandr Voroshilov	Uzbekistan	104.80	0	65	156.68	52	43	did not advance					
75	72	Samuel Muturi	Kenya	118.74	4	67	162.87	2	44	did not advance					
76	57	Jun Yi Ong	Singapore	120.84	8	68	168.30	54	45	did not advance					
77	80	Matteo-Alexander Olar	Romania	122.56	8	70	170.97	4	46	did not advance					
78	68	Ignacio Bakovic	Chile	158.86	52	77	205.64	100	47	did not advance					
79	65	Vilius Rasimavicius	Lithuania	155.76	56	76	211.65	106	48	did not advance					
80	73	Levis Peter Karanja	Kenya	611.85	514	80	542.62	458	49	did not advance					
