= Canoeing at the 2010 Asian Games – Men's slalom K-1 =

Men's K-1 at the 2010 Asian Games
- Venue: Guangzhou International Rowing Centre
- Date: 13–14 November 2010
- Competitors: 9 from 8 nations

Medalists
gold medal	Huang Cunguang	China
silver medal	Kazuki Yazawa	Japan
bronze medal	Xian Jinbin	China

The men's K-1 slalom canoeing competition at the 2010 Asian Games in Guangzhou was held on 13 and 14 November at the International Rowing Centre.

== Schedule ==
All times are China Standard Time (UTC+08:00)

Date	Time	Event
Saturday, 13 November 2010	10:32	Heats 1st run
Saturday, 13 November 2010	11:40	Heats 2nd run
Sunday, 14 November 2010	10:32	Semifinal
Sunday, 14 November 2010	11:40	Final

== Results ==
Legend

- DNF — Did not finish
- DSQR — Disqualified for particular run

=== Heats ===
Rank	Athlete	1st run			2nd run			Best
Rank	Athlete	Time	Pen.	Total	Time	Pen.	Total	Best
1	Huang Cunguang (CHN)	86.36	0	86.36	86.27	4	90.27	86.36
2	Kazuki Yazawa (JPN)	90.05	2	92.05	87.35	2	89.35	89.35
3	Hermann Husslein (THA)	91.84	4	95.84	90.05	0	90.05	90.05
4	Xian Jinbin (CHN)	88.26	4	92.26	86.60	6	92.60	92.26
5	Yuriy Myagkiy (UZB)			DSQR	92.89	8	100.89	100.89
6	Lin Hsiang-chun (TPE)	101.71	10	111.71	103.61	4	107.61	107.61
7	Yoon Young-jung (KOR)	139.84	62	201.84	118.31	10	128.31	128.31
8	Sze Lui (HKG)	170.41	104	274.41	166.83	4	170.83	170.83
9	Vikram Singh Bhandari (IND)	112.36	652	764.36	172.00	356	528.00	528.00

=== Semifinal ===
Rank	Athlete	Time	Pen.	Total
1	Huang Cunguang (CHN)	91.32	0	91.32
2	Kazuki Yazawa (JPN)	88.63	4	92.63
3	Xian Jinbin (CHN)	91.30	4	95.30
4	Yuriy Myagkiy (UZB)	100.01	2	102.01
5	Lin Hsiang-chun (TPE)	103.61	10	113.61
6	Hermann Husslein (THA)	94.69	52	146.69
7	Yoon Young-jung (KOR)	128.33	22	150.33
8	Sze Lui (HKG)	181.28	6	187.28
9	Vikram Singh Bhandari (IND)			DNF

=== Final ===
Rank	Athlete	Time	Pen.	Total
1st place, gold medalist(s)	Huang Cunguang (CHN)	88.15	0	88.15
2nd place, silver medalist(s)	Kazuki Yazawa (JPN)	87.83	2	89.83
3rd place, bronze medalist(s)	Xian Jinbin (CHN)	90.57	0	90.57
4	Hermann Husslein (THA)	90.93	0	90.93
5	Lin Hsiang-chun (TPE)	105.85	2	107.85
6	Yuriy Myagkiy (UZB)	105.75	4	109.75
7	Sze Lui (HKG)	159.72	6	165.72
8	Yoon Young-jung (KOR)	130.61	58	188.61
9	Vikram Singh Bhandari (IND)	133.51	550	683.51
