= Canoeing at the 2018 Asian Games – Men's slalom K-1 =

Men's K-1 at the 2018 Asian Games
- Venue: Bendung Rentang
- Date: 21–23 August 2018
- Competitors: 16 from 10 nations

Medalists
| gold medal | Quan Xin | China |
| silver medal | Kazuya Adachi | Japan |
| bronze medal | Hermann Husslein | Thailand |

The men's slalom K-1 (kayak single) competition at the 2018 Asian Games was held from 21 to 23 August 2018. Each NOC could enter two athletes but only one of them could advance to the final.

== Schedule ==
All times are Western Indonesia Time (UTC+07:00)

| Date | Time | Event |
|---|---|---|
| Tuesday, 21 August 2018 | 13:24 | Heats |
| Thursday, 23 August 2018 | 10:03 | Semifinal |
| Thursday, 23 August 2018 | 11:48 | Final |

== Results ==
Legend

- DNS — Did not start

=== Heats ===
| Rank | Athlete | 1st run | | | 2nd run | | | Best |
| Rank | Athlete | Time | Pen. | Total | Time | Pen. | Total | Best |
|---|---|---|---|---|---|---|---|---|
| 1 | Quan Xin (CHN) | 81.26 | 0 | 81.26 | | | DNS | 81.26 |
| 2 | Taku Yoshida (JPN) | 87.60 | 4 | 91.60 | 81.67 | 0 | 81.67 | 81.67 |
| 3 | Zhu Haoran (CHN) | 88.47 | 0 | 88.47 | 82.59 | 0 | 82.59 | 82.59 |
| 4 | Hermann Husslein (THA) | 83.23 | 0 | 83.23 | | | DNS | 83.23 |
| 5 | Kazuya Adachi (JPN) | 84.77 | 2 | 86.77 | | | DNS | 86.77 |
| 6 | Wu Shao-hsuan (TPE) | 88.50 | 2 | 90.50 | 87.65 | 0 | 87.65 | 87.65 |
| 7 | Amir Mohammad Fattahpour (IRI) | 91.26 | 0 | 91.26 | 115.08 | 2 | 117.08 | 91.26 |
| 8 | Song Min-hyeong (KOR) | 91.82 | 0 | 91.82 | 91.92 | 0 | 91.92 | 91.82 |
| 9 | Paitas Ngamsanga (THA) | 111.08 | 2 | 113.08 | 91.97 | 2 | 93.97 | 93.97 |
| 10 | Djanibek Temirgaliev (UZB) | 101.02 | 2 | 103.02 | 93.46 | 2 | 95.46 | 95.46 |
| 11 | Lee Dong-heon (KOR) | 97.09 | 0 | 97.09 | 123.68 | 6 | 129.68 | 97.09 |
| 12 | Arifal (INA) | 95.36 | 2 | 97.36 | 98.93 | 2 | 100.93 | 97.36 |
| 13 | Ramil Kirpichev (UZB) | 100.73 | 4 | 104.73 | 93.48 | 6 | 99.48 | 99.48 |
| 14 | Chandra Destia Nugraha (INA) | 103.81 | 2 | 105.81 | 97.82 | 6 | 103.82 | 103.82 |
| 15 | Nazrin Najib (MAS) | 117.70 | 2 | 119.70 | 106.99 | 6 | 112.99 | 112.99 |
| 16 | Maksim Serditov (KGZ) | 145.35 | 18 | 163.35 | 129.74 | 56 | 185.74 | 163.35 |

=== Semifinal ===
| Rank | Athlete | Time | Pen. | Total |
|---|---|---|---|---|
| 1 | Quan Xin (CHN) | 84.12 | 0 | 84.12 |
| 2 | Kazuya Adachi (JPN) | 86.10 | 0 | 86.10 |
| 3 | Taku Yoshida (JPN) | 86.49 | 0 | 86.49 |
| 4 | Zhu Haoran (CHN) | 89.07 | 0 | 89.07 |
| 5 | Wu Shao-hsuan (TPE) | 94.31 | 0 | 94.31 |
| 6 | Hermann Husslein (THA) | 94.75 | 0 | 94.75 |
| 7 | Djanibek Temirgaliev (UZB) | 95.02 | 4 | 99.02 |
| 8 | Amir Mohammad Fattahpour (IRI) | 98.26 | 2 | 100.26 |
| 9 | Song Min-hyeong (KOR) | 99.43 | 2 | 101.43 |
| 10 | Paitas Ngamsanga (THA) | 103.86 | 2 | 105.86 |
| 11 | Lee Dong-heon (KOR) | 105.81 | 2 | 107.81 |
| 12 | Ramil Kirpichev (UZB) | 116.99 | 4 | 120.99 |
| 13 | Arifal (INA) | 124.98 | 6 | 130.98 |

=== Final ===
| Rank | Athlete | Time | Pen. | Total |
|---|---|---|---|---|
| 1st place, gold medalist(s) | Quan Xin (CHN) | 87.39 | 2 | 89.39 |
| 2nd place, silver medalist(s) | Kazuya Adachi (JPN) | 88.26 | 2 | 90.26 |
| 3rd place, bronze medalist(s) | Hermann Husslein (THA) | 90.40 | 0 | 90.40 |
| 4 | Wu Shao-hsuan (TPE) | 94.12 | 0 | 94.12 |
| 5 | Amir Mohammad Fattahpour (IRI) | 94.90 | 0 | 94.90 |
| 6 | Djanibek Temirgaliev (UZB) | 97.44 | 0 | 97.44 |
| 7 | Arifal (INA) | 106.96 | 2 | 108.96 |
| 8 | Song Min-hyeong (KOR) | 94.63 | 54 | 148.63 |
