= Canoeing at the 2004 Summer Olympics – Women's slalom K-1 =

These are the results of the women's K-1 slalom competition in canoeing at the 2004 Summer Olympics. The K-1 (kayak single) event is raced by one-man kayaks through a whitewater course. The venue for the 2004 Olympic competition was the Olympic Canoe/Kayak Slalom Centre at the Helliniko Olympic Complex.

== Medalists ==
Gold	Silver	Bronze
Elena Kaliská (SVK)	Rebecca Giddens (USA)	Helen Reeves (GBR)

== Results ==
The 19 competitors each took two preliminary runs through the whitewater slalom course. The top 15 kayakers by combined time from the two runs advanced to the semifinal. The top 10 times from the single semifinal run determined the finalists. Ranking and medals are based on the combined time of the semifinal run and the final run. The preliminary runs were raced on August 17 and the semifinal and final runs were on August 18.

Rank	Name	Country	Preliminary Round				Semifinal		Final	
Rank	Name	Country	Run 1	Run 2	Total	Rank	Time	Rank	Time	Total
Gold	Elena Kaliská	Slovakia	104.24	108.41	212.65	2	103.74	1	106.29	210.03
Silver	Rebecca Giddens	United States	108.36	116.58	224.94	5	107.56	4	107.06	214.62
Bronze	Helen Reeves	Great Britain	110.12	103.51	213.63	3	108.90	5	109.87	218.77
4	Peggy Dickens	France	121.31	108.27	229.58	12	104.95	2	113.85	218.80
5	Štěpánka Hilgertová	Czech Republic	117.05	111.70	228.75	11	111.31	8	109.44	220.75
6	Nagwa El Desouki	Switzerland	118.38	110.27	228.65	10	113.24	9	111.80	225.04
7	Louise Natoli	Australia	115.83	111.38	227.21	8	113.24	9	111.80	227.44
8	Cristina Giai Pron	Italy	116.18	114.59	230.77	13	109.27	6	120.09	229.36
9	Jennifer Bongardt	Germany	102.96	109.24	212.20	1	107.36	3	130.30	237.66
10	Gabriela Stacherová	Slovakia	110.08	114.58	224.66	4	109.85	7	164.62	274.47
11	Eadaoin Ní Challarain	Ireland	121.42	119.33	240.75	15	116.95	11		
12	Violetta Oblinger-Peters	Austria	110.95	115.55	226.50	7	117.09	12		
13	Agnieszka Stanuch	Poland	118.57	115.32	233.89	14	120.73	13		
14	Mandy Planert	Germany	114.90	110.87	225.77	6	122.61	14		
15	Irena Pavelková	Czech Republic	116.08	111.38	227.46	9	161.49	15		
16	Margaret Langford	Canada	123.02	121.89	244.91	16				
17	Maria Ferekidi	Greece	124.85	125.43	250.28	17				
18	Li Jingjing	China	134.07	125.85	259.92	18				
19	Nada Mali	Slovenia	165.65	112.83	278.48	19				
