= Lucas Timmins =

American biomedical engineer (born 1982)

- Born: December 8, 1982 (age 43); Port Neches, Texas
- Education: Texas A&M; Georgia Institute of Technology; Emory University
- Scientific career
- Fields: Biomechanics; Interventional Cardiology
- Workplaces: University of Utah

Lucas H. Timmins (born December 8, 1982) is an American biomedical engineer and currently an associate professor at Texas A&M University. He is active in the fields of computational and experimental biomechanics and the application of these research domains to address prevalent challenges in cardiovascular medicine.

== Early life and education ==
Timmins was born December 8, 1982, in Port Neches, Texas. He attended Port Neches-Groves high school, graduating in May 2001.

Timmins received a Bachelor of Science in Biomedical Engineering from Texas A&M University in 2005. He received a Whitaker International Fellowship in 2007 and performed research in the pathology group at the Blizard Institute, part of the Barts and The London School of Medicine and Dentistry, under the supervision of Stephen E. Greenwald. He obtained a Doctor of Philosophy in 2010, working under James E. Moore Jr., from Texas A&M University. His dissertation research focused on the altered biomechanical environment in the setting of vascular stenting.

== Career and research ==
After post-doctoral work under the mentorship of Don Giddens at Georgia Institute of Technology and Emory University School of Medicine, Timmins became an instructor in the Department of Radiology & Imaging Sciences at Emory University School of Medicine in 2015. From 2016 to 2023, Timmins was on faculty (Assistant Professor, 2016–2023; Associate Professor, 2023) in the Department of Biomedical Engineering at the University of Utah. Since 2023, he has been an associate professor in the School of Engineering Medicine and the Department of Biomedical Engineering at Texas A&M University. Timmins is an Affiliate Faculty Member in the Scientific Computing and Imaging Institute at the University of Utah.

The scientific fields he is most actively involved in are biomechanics and interventional cardiology. His research has included work in determining how coronary hemodynamics drive the progression of coronary atherosclerosis1 and also understanding the mechanics of dealing with the failure of vascular stents.

Timmins was the primary author of a paper that looked at stented artery biomechanics to optimize device design2. This research aimed to validate an algorithm for optimizing stent design to minimize or maximize various blood vessel mechanical properties.

Timmins was part of a team of researchers that investigated the correlation of plaque area, plaque composition, and vessel remodeling as a function of wall shear stress.

Timmins was a supporting author on a study exploring how device design effects the mechanics of the artery wall. The purpose of this study was to investigate the effects that different stent parameters have on the stresses in the artery wall after implantation and the resulting radial displacement that is achieved by the stent in the interest of preventing failures, such as restenosis or formation of a new blockage.

== Selected awards and honors ==
- Outstanding Postdoc Award (1 of 4 awarded in School of Medicine), Emory University School of Medicine (2015)
- Young Investigator Award, 8th International Symposium on Biomechanics in Vascular Biology & Cardiovascular Disease, Rotterdam, NL (2013)
- Robert M. Nerem International Travel Award, Parker H. Petit Institute of Bioengineering & Biosciences, Georgia Institute of Technology (2012)
- American Heart Association Postdoctoral Fellowship (Greater Southeast Affiliate) (2011)
- Gandy-Diaz Teaching Fellowship, Wallace H. Coulter Dept. of Biomedical Engineering, Georgia Institute of Technology and Emory University (2011)
