= Eric Giddens =

American kayaker

Eric M. Giddens (born 8 May 1973 in Atlanta) is an American slalom kayaker who competed from the early 1990s to the early 2000s.

== Career ==
Giddens finished 20th in the men's K1 slalom event at the 1996 Summer Olympics in Atlanta.

Giddens has been the NBC analyst for both disciplines of canoeing during the 2012, 2016, and 2020 Summer Olympics.

== World Cup individual podiums ==
| Season | Date | Venue | Position | Event |
|---|---|---|---|---|
| 2000 | 18 Jun 2000 | Ocoee | 1st | K1 |

== Family and education ==
A native of Atlanta, Giddens graduated with a degree in environmental biology from Georgia Tech and earned a Ph.D. in oceanography from Scripps Institution of Oceanography. His father is educator Don Giddens. His wife, Rebecca Giddens, won a silver in the women's K1 event at the 2004 Summer Olympics in Athens. They now own a brewpub in Kernville, California.
