= Canoeing at the 2014 Asian Games – Men's slalom K-1 =

Men's K-1 at the 2014 Asian Games
- Venue: Misari Regatta
- Date: 1–2 October 2014
- Competitors: 19 from 13 nations

Medalists
gold medal	Kazuya Adachi	Japan
silver medal	Pan Hung-ming	Chinese Taipei
bronze medal	Yuan Tao	China

The men's K-1 slalom canoeing competition at the 2014 Asian Games in Hanam was held from 1 to 2 October at the Misari Canoe/Kayak Center. The slalom event was on flat water and not an artificial canoe slalom course. The K-1 (kayak single) event is raced by one-man kayaks. Each NOC could enter two athletes but only one of them could advance to the semifinal.

== Schedule ==
All times are Korea Standard Time (UTC+09:00)

Date	Time	Event
Wednesday, 1 October 2014	11:10	Heats
Wednesday, 1 October 2014	12:37	Repechage
Wednesday, 1 October 2014	15:00	Last 16
Wednesday, 1 October 2014	16:30	Quarterfinals
Thursday, 2 October 2014	15:30	Semifinals
Thursday, 2 October 2014	15:55	Finals

== Results ==
Legend

- DNF — Did not finish

=== Heats ===
Rank	Athlete	Time
1	Kazuya Adachi (JPN)	1:02.99
2	Yuan Tao (CHN)	1:03.05
3	Tan Ya (CHN)	1:03.83
4	Pan Hung-ming (TPE)	1:04.65
5	Taku Yoshida (JPN)	1:05.35
6	Mohammad Sedigh Heshmatian (IRI)	1:05.55
7	Hermann Husslein (THA)	1:06.27
8	Lee Jeong-hyeon (KOR)	1:06.75
9	Yuriy Myagkiy (UZB)	1:06.95
10	Tulkin Abdumurotov (UZB)	1:07.61
11	Pavel Zinovyev (KAZ)	1:07.91
12	Song Min-hyeong (KOR)	1:08.44
13	Chanrit Chakkhian (THA)	1:10.18
14	Chandra Destia Nugraha (INA)	1:13.01
15	Brandon Ooi (SIN)	1:14.64
16	Ivan Snopkov (KGZ)	1:17.05
17	Syaheenul Aiman (SIN)	1:21.77
18	Nim Bahadur Magar (NEP)	1:23.04
—	Kuldeep Singh Keer (IND)	DNF

=== Repechage ===
Rank	Athlete	Time
1	Yuriy Myagkiy (UZB)	1:07.04
2	Tulkin Abdumurotov (UZB)	1:07.12
3	Pavel Zinovyev (KAZ)	1:07.97
4	Chanrit Chakkhian (THA)	1:09.39
5	Song Min-hyeong (KOR)	1:10.22
6	Chandra Destia Nugraha (INA)	1:11.10
7	Brandon Ooi (SIN)	1:15.20
8	Ivan Snopkov (KGZ)	1:16.14
9	Nim Bahadur Magar (NEP)	1:23.31
10	Syaheenul Aiman (SIN)	1:26.02

=== Last 16 ===
Rank	Athlete	Time
1	Yuan Tao (CHN)	1:02.56
2	Tan Ya (CHN)	1:03.06
3	Kazuya Adachi (JPN)	1:03.95
4	Hermann Husslein (THA)	1:04.79
5	Pan Hung-ming (TPE)	1:05.16
6	Taku Yoshida (JPN)	1:05.49
7	Yuriy Myagkiy (UZB)	1:05.81
8	Mohammad Sedigh Heshmatian (IRI)	1:07.07
9	Lee Jeong-hyeon (KOR)	1:07.08
10	Pavel Zinovyev (KAZ)	1:07.15
11	Tulkin Abdumurotov (UZB)	1:07.98
12	Song Min-hyeong (KOR)	1:08.41
13	Chandra Destia Nugraha (INA)	1:09.46
14	Chanrit Chakkhian (THA)	1:09.77
15	Ivan Snopkov (KGZ)	1:14.08
16	Brandon Ooi (SIN)	1:14.45

=== Knockout round ===
Quarterfinals
1	Yuan Tao (CHN)	1:04.92
5	Pan Hung-ming (TPE)	1:06.82
2	Tan Ya (CHN)	1:05.68
6	Taku Yoshida (JPN)	1:08.20
3	Kazuya Adachi (JPN)	1:06.89
7	Yuriy Myagkiy (UZB)	1:10.61
4	Hermann Husslein (THA)	1:06.47
8	Mohammad Sedigh Heshmatian (IRI)	1:07.45

Semifinals
1	Yuan Tao (CHN)	1:05.14
3	Pan Hung-ming (TPE)	1:05.14
(Pairings are reseeded after the first round)
2	Kazuya Adachi (JPN)	1:05.13
4	Hermann Husslein (THA)	1:06.41

Gold medal
3	Pan Hung-ming (TPE)	1:06.07
2	Kazuya Adachi (JPN)	1:04.96
Bronze medal
1	Yuan Tao (CHN)	1:04.82
4	Hermann Husslein (THA)	1:07.92

- Tan Ya (CHN) got eliminated because each NOC was limited to one athlete in the semifinal.
