= Shota Saito =

Shota Saito may refer to:

- Shota Saito (footballer, born 1996) (斎藤 翔太), Japanese footballer
- Shota Saito (actor) (斉藤 祥太), Japanese actor who plays Kyle Katayanagi in Scott Pilgrim vs. the World
- Shota Saito (canoeist), Japanese canoeist who competed in Canoeing at the 2022 Asian Games – Men's slalom C-1
