= Herde =

Herde may be,

- Ariane Herde
- Herdé language
