= Yuriko Takeshita =

Japanese canoeist

Medal record

Women's canoe slalom

Representing Japan

Asian Championships
Gold medal – first place	2013 Shuili	K1
Gold medal – first place	2013 Shuili	K1 team
Gold medal – first place	2016 Toyama	K1 team

Yuriko Takeshita (竹下 百合子, Takeshita Yuriko, born November 23, 1988 in Fussa, Tokyo) is a Japanese slalom canoer who has competed since the mid-2000s. She finished fourth in the K-1 event at the 2008 Summer Olympics in Beijing.
