= Canoeing at the 2008 Summer Olympics – Women's slalom K-1 =

The women's K-1 slalom competition in canoeing at the 2008 Summer Olympics took place on August 13 and August 15, 2008 at the Shunyi Olympic Rowing-Canoeing Park in Beijing. The K-1 (kayak single) event is raced by one-person kayaks through a whitewater course. The final was rescheduled to the 15th due to persistent lightning at the Park.

There were three rounds of competitions: the heats, the semifinal, and the final. In the heats, each canoeist completed two runs of the course. The time, in seconds, of each run was added to the number of penalty points assessed. Touching any of the 21 slalom gates resulted in a 2-second penalty for each gate touched, while skipping any of the gates resulted in a 50-second penalty. The total times for the two preliminary runs were summed to give a score for the heats. The top 15 boats advanced to the semifinals.

The semifinals consisted of a single run. The field was narrowed to the top 10 scores from that run; those 10 boats advanced to the final. The times from the final were added to the semifinal score to give an overall total.

== Schedule ==
All times are China Standard Time (UTC+8)

Date	Time	Round
Wednesday, August 13, 2008	15:40-16:40	Heats 1st Run
Wednesday, August 13, 2008	17:22-18:20	Heats 2nd Run
Thursday, August 14, 2008	15:35-16:45	Semifinal
Thursday, August 14, 2008	17:12-18:00	Final

== Medalists ==
Gold	Silver	Bronze
Elena Kaliská (SVK)	Jacqueline Lawrence (AUS)	Violetta Oblinger-Peters (AUT)

== Results ==
=== Heats ===
Rank	Name	Country	Preliminary runs		
Rank	Name	Country	Run 1	Run 2	Total
1	Elena Kaliská	Slovakia	94.34	91.85	186.19
2	Li Jingjing	China	94.30	93.26	187.56
3	Štěpánka Hilgertová	Czech Republic	97.14	91.99	189.13
4	Jennifer Bongardt	Germany	92.79	94.58	189.37
5	Émilie Fer	France	96.90	92.78	189.68
6	Violetta Oblinger-Peters	Austria	97.27	99.44	196.71
7	Jacqueline Lawrence	Australia	103.18	96.95	200.13
8	Agnieszka Stanuch	Poland	101.16	101.76	202.92
9	Cristina Giai Pron	Italy	102.75	100.95	203.70
10	Heather Corrie	United States	105.78	105.53	211.31
11	Yekaterina Lukicheva	Kazakhstan	113.26	108.03	221.29
12	Maria Ferekidi	Greece	108.37	113.60	221.97
13	Ariane Herde	Netherlands	104.30	117.98	222.28
14	Poliana de Paula	Brazil	113.47	110.72	224.19
15	Yuriko Takeshita	Japan	111.63	113.08	224.71
16	Maialen Chourraut	Spain	147.95	105.44	253.39
17	Fiona Pennie	Great Britain	160.06	99.00	259.06
18	Aleksandra Perova	Russia	93.41	166.04	259.45
19	Sarah Boudens	Canada	158.99	109.68	268.67
20	Montserrat García Riberaygua	Andorra	166.67	102.26	268.93
21	Luuka Jones	New Zealand	162.35	110.01	272.36

Qualified for semifinal

=== Semifinal ===
Rank	Name	Country	Semifinal run	
Rank	Name	Country	Penalty seconds	Time
1	Elena Kaliská	Slovakia	0	97.13
2	Émilie Fer	France	2	98.50
3	Štěpánka Hilgertová	Czech Republic	4	101.78
4	Jacqueline Lawrence	Australia	4	103.40
5	Cristina Giai Pron	Italy	2	104.52
6	Yuriko Takeshita	Japan	0	107.86
7	Violetta Oblinger-Peters	Austria	2	110.65
8	Heather Corrie	United States	2	114.51
9	Agnieszka Stanuch	Poland	2	116.46
10	Ariane Herde	Netherlands	4	117.60
11	Maria Ferekidi	Greece	2	118.99
12	Yekaterina Lukicheva	Kazakhstan	2	128.08
13	Li Jingjing	China	54	161.79
14	Poliana de Paula	Brazil	52	168.29
15	Jennifer Bongardt	Germany	102	203.29

Qualified for final

=== Final ===
Rank	Name	Country	Semifinal run		Final run		Total
Rank	Name	Country	Penalty seconds	Time	Penalty seconds	Time	Total
1st place, gold medalist(s)	Elena Kaliská	Slovakia	0	97.13	0	95.51	192.64
2nd place, silver medalist(s)	Jacqueline Lawrence	Australia	4	103.40	0	103.54	206.94
3rd place, bronze medalist(s)	Violetta Oblinger-Peters	Austria	2	110.65	4	104.12	214.77
4	Yuriko Takeshita	Japan	0	107.86	4	111.44	219.30
5	Agnieszka Stanuch	Poland	2	116.46	2	104.62	221.08
6	Ariane Herde	Netherlands	4	117.60	6	114.39	231.99
7	Émilie Fer	France	2	98.50	54	153.46	251.96
8	Heather Corrie	United States	2	114.51	52	156.37	270.88
9	Štěpánka Hilgertová	Czech Republic	4	101.78	150	242.63	344.41
10	Cristina Giai Pron	Italy	2	104.52	154	251.26	355.78
