= Pan Hung-ming =

Taiwanese canoeist

Personal information
- Born: 29 October 1992 (age 33)
- Height: 162 cm (5 ft 4 in)
- Weight: 64 kg (141 lb)
Medal record
Men's canoe slalom
Representing Chinese Taipei
Asian Games
Silver medal – second place	2014 Incheon	K-1
Asian Championships
Gold medal – first place	2013 Shuili	C2
Silver medal – second place	2013 Shuili	K1 team
Bronze medal – third place	2016 Toyama	C2 team

Pan Hung-ming (Chinese: 潘泓銘; born 29 October 1992) is a Taiwanese male slalom canoeist. He won Silver medal in Canoeing at the 2014 Asian Games in Men's slalom K-1 category.
