= Canoeing at the 2015 Pan American Games – Men's slalom K-1 =

Men's slalom K-1 at the 2015 Pan American Games
- Venue: Minden Wild Water Preserve
- Dates: July 18–19
- Competitors: 9 from 9 nations
- Winning time: 87.14

Medalists
| Gold medal | Michal Smolen | United States |
| Silver medal | Pepe Gonçalves | Brazil |
| Bronze medal | Ben Hayward | Canada |

The men's slalom K-1 canoeing event at the 2015 Pan American Games will be held between the 18 and 19 of July at the Minden Wild Water Preserve in Minden Hills. At the Pan American Sports Organization's 2013 general assembly in Jamaica, canoe slalom competitions were added to the program. This will be the first time slalom has been staged at the Pan American Games. Furthermore, women will also compete in canoe races for the first time ever in both disciplines. The winners of the four canoe slalom competitions (besides the C-1 women event, which is not an Olympic event) will qualify for the 2016 Summer Olympics in Rio de Janeiro, Brazil. If the host nation of the Olympics (Brazil) wins the event, the runner up will qualify instead.

== Schedule ==
The following is the competition schedule for the event:

All times are Eastern Daylight Time (UTC−4)

| Date | Time | Round |
|---|---|---|
| July 18, 2015 | 11:11 | Heat–Run 1 |
| July 18, 2015 | 12:43 | Heat–Run 2 |
| July 19, 2015 | 11:09 | Semi-final |
| July 19, 2015 | 13:49 | Final |

== Results ==
=== Heat ===
| Rank | Name | Nation | Run 1 | | | Run 2 | | | Best | Notes |
| Rank | Name | Nation | Time | Pen. | Total | Time | Pen. | Total | Best | Notes |
|---|---|---|---|---|---|---|---|---|---|---|
| 1 | Pedro Gonçalves da Silva | Brazil | 83.15 | 0 | 83.15 | 83.83 | 52 | 135.83 | 83.15 | Q |
| 2 | Ben Hayward | Canada | 86.14 | 2 | 88.14 | 84.85 | 2 | 86.85 | 86.85 | Q |
| 3 | Michal Smolen | United States | 84.91 | 100 | 184.91 | 92.54 | 4 | 96.54 | 96.54 | Q |
| 4 | Alexis Pérez | Venezuela | 95.40 | 4 | 99.40 | 96.75 | 0 | 96.75 | 96.75 | Q |
| 5 | Geronimo Cortez | Argentina | 95.26 | 6 | 101.26 | 88.79 | 10 | 98.79 | 98.79 | Q |
| 6 | Arnaldo Cespedes Perez | Costa Rica | 106.17 | 60 | 166.17 | 101.14 | 0 | 101.14 | 101.14 | Q |
| 7 | Breiner Matiz | Colombia | 119.95 | 6 | 125.95 | 108.31 | 0 | 108.31 | 108.31 | Q |
| 8 | Andres Sierra | Mexico | 109.24 | 4 | 113.24 | 112.64 | 0 | 112.64 | 112.64 | |
| 9 | Andraz Echeverria | Chile | 128.83 | 4 | 132.83 | 119.01 | 2 | 121.01 | 121.01 | |

=== Semifinal ===
| Rank | Name | Nation | Time | Pen. | Total | Notes |
|---|---|---|---|---|---|---|
| 1 | Ben Hayward | Canada | 86.83 | 0 | 86.83 | Q |
| 2 | Pedro Gonçalves da Silva | Brazil | 88.67 | 0 | 88.67 | Q |
| 3 | Michal Smolen | United States | 89.49 | 0 | 89.49 | Q |
| 4 | Geronimo Cortez | Argentina | 95.77 | 2 | 97.77 | Q |
| 5 | Alexis Pérez | Venezuela | 98.41 | 4 | 102.41 | Q |
| 6 | Arnaldo Cespedes Perez | Costa Rica | 110.42 | 6 | 116.42 | Q |
| 7 | Breiner Matiz | Colombia | 114.04 | 6 | 120.04 | |

=== Final ===
| Rank | Name | Nation | Time | Pen. | Total | Notes |
|---|---|---|---|---|---|---|
| 1st place, gold medalist(s) | Michal Smolen | United States | 87.14 | 0 | 87.14 | |
| 2nd place, silver medalist(s) | Pedro Gonçalves da Silva | Brazil | 87.02 | 2 | 89.02 | |
| 3rd place, bronze medalist(s) | Ben Hayward | Canada | 88.76 | 4 | 92.76 | |
| 4 | Alexis Pérez | Venezuela | 96.38 | 2 | 98.38 | |
| 5 | Arnaldo Cespedes Perez | Costa Rica | 104.98 | 2 | 106.98 | |
| 6 | Geronimo Cortez | Argentina | 102.66 | 6 | 108.66 | |
