= Ayano Sato (canoeist) =

Japan canoeist (born 1996)

Personal information
- Nationality: Japanese
- Born: 29 December 1996 (age 29)

Sport
- Sport: Canoe slalom
- Event: C1
Medal record
Women's canoe slalom
Representing Japan
Asian Championships
Silver medal – second place	2016 Toyama	C1

Ayano Sato (佐藤彩乃, Satō Ayano; born 29 December 1996) is a Japan slalom canoeist who has competed at the international level since 2015.

She represented the host country in the C1 event at the delayed 2020 Summer Olympics in Tokyo, where she finished in 20th position after being eliminated in the heats.
