= 2013 Asian Canoe Slalom Championships =

Canoeing competition in Shuili, Taiwan

- Host city: Shuili, Taiwan
- Dates: 23–26 May 2013
- Main venue: Shuili River

The 2013 Asian Canoe Slalom Championships were the 8th Asian Canoe Slalom Championships and took place from May 23–26, 2013 in Shuili River, Shuili, Taiwan.

== Medal summary ==
=== Individual ===
Event	Gold	Silver	Bronze
Men's C-1	Shota Sasaki; Japan	Chen Bo-wun; Chinese Taipei	Alexandr Kulikov; Kazakhstan
Men's C-2	Chinese Taipei; Pan Hung-ming; Chang Yun-chuan	Chinese Taipei; Lee Han-cheng; Chiu Huai-chun	Chinese Taipei; Wu Tai-yi; Chen Bo-wun
Men's C-2	Chinese Taipei; Pan Hung-ming; Chang Yun-chuan	Japan; Shota Sasaki; Tsubasa Sasaki	Thailand; Chaaue Pala; Chatuphon Thimthong
Men's K-1	Kazuki Yazawa; Japan	Hermann Husslein; Thailand	Kazuya Adachi; Japan
Men's K-1	Kazuki Yazawa; Japan	Hermann Husslein; Thailand	Lee Han-cheng; Chinese Taipei
Women's C-1	Svetlana Polezhayeva; Kazakhstan	Yoshika Ito; Japan	Chen Wei-han; Chinese Taipei
Women's K-1	Yuriko Takeshita; Japan	Chang Chu-han; Chinese Taipei	Yoshika Ito; Japan
Women's K-1	Yuriko Takeshita; Japan	Chang Chu-han; Chinese Taipei	Yekaterina Lukicheva; Kazakhstan

=== Team ===
Event	Gold	Silver	Bronze
Men's C-1	Chinese Taipei; Chiu Huai-chun; Chang Yun-chuan; Chen Bo-wun	Kazakhstan; Alexandr Kulikov; Svetlana Polezhayeva; Yekaterina Lukicheva	Thailand; Yutthakan Chaidet; Chaaue Pala; Chatuphon Thimthong
Men's K-1	Japan; Kazuya Adachi; Kazuki Yazawa; Daichi Kojima	Chinese Taipei; Lee Han-cheng; Lu Yu-jen; Pan Hung-ming	Thailand; Hermann Husslein; Ekwit Chuapoon; Siwanat Bullard
Women's K-1	Japan; Yuriko Takeshita; Yoshika Ito; Ren Mishima	Chinese Taipei; Chang Chu-han; Liu Jen-yu; Rao Chih-shuan	Thailand; Sirijit Onnom; Nipaporn Nopsri; Chayanin Sripadung

== Medal table ==
Rank	Nation	Gold	Silver	Bronze	Total
1	Japan	5	2	2	9
2	Chinese Taipei	2	5	3	10
3	Kazakhstan	1	1	2	4
4	Thailand	0	1	4	5
Totals (4 entries)		8	9	11	28

== See also ==
- List of sporting events in Taiwan
