= Poliana de Paula =

Brazilian slalom canoer (born 1989)

Poliana Aparecida de Paula
Personal information
- Born: October 18, 1989 (age 35); Piraju, Brazil

Sport
- Sport: Canoe slalom

Poliana Aparecida de Paula (born October 18, 1989 in Piraju) is a Brazilian slalom canoer who has competed since the late 2000s. She was eliminated in the semifinals of the K-1 event at the 2008 Summer Olympics in Beijing, finishing in 14th place.
