= Antoine Launay =

Portuguese Canoeist

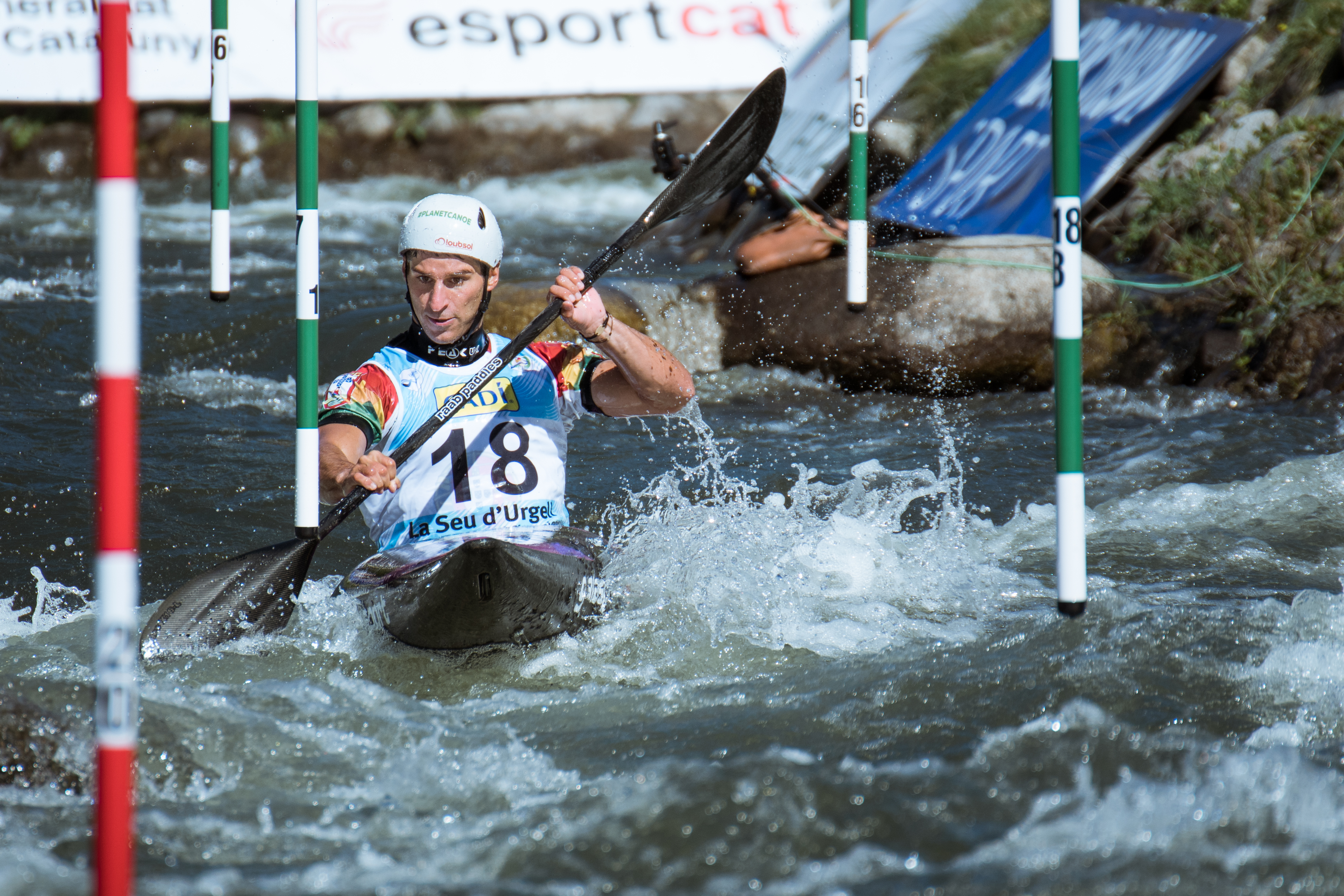
- Launay at the 2019 World Championships

Personal information
- Nationality: Portuguese
- Born: 29 June 1993 (age 33) Toulouse

Sport
- Country: Portugal
- Sport: Canoe slalom
- Rank: No. 20
- Event: K1
Medal record
Men's canoe slalom
Representing Portugal

Antoine Manuel Sylvain Quintal Launay (born 28 June 1993) is a French-Portuguese slalom canoeist who has competed at the international level since 2011 when he represented France at the European Junior Championships. He has represented Portugal since 2016.

== Career ==
Born and based in Toulouse, Launay has competed at numerous European Championship, World Championship, and World Cup events. He finished 7th in the K1 event at the 2019 World Championships. He competed in the K1 event at the delayed 2020 Summer Olympics in Tokyo, finishing in 11th position after being eliminated in the semifinal.
