= Nadine Weratschnig =

Austrian canoeist (born 1998)

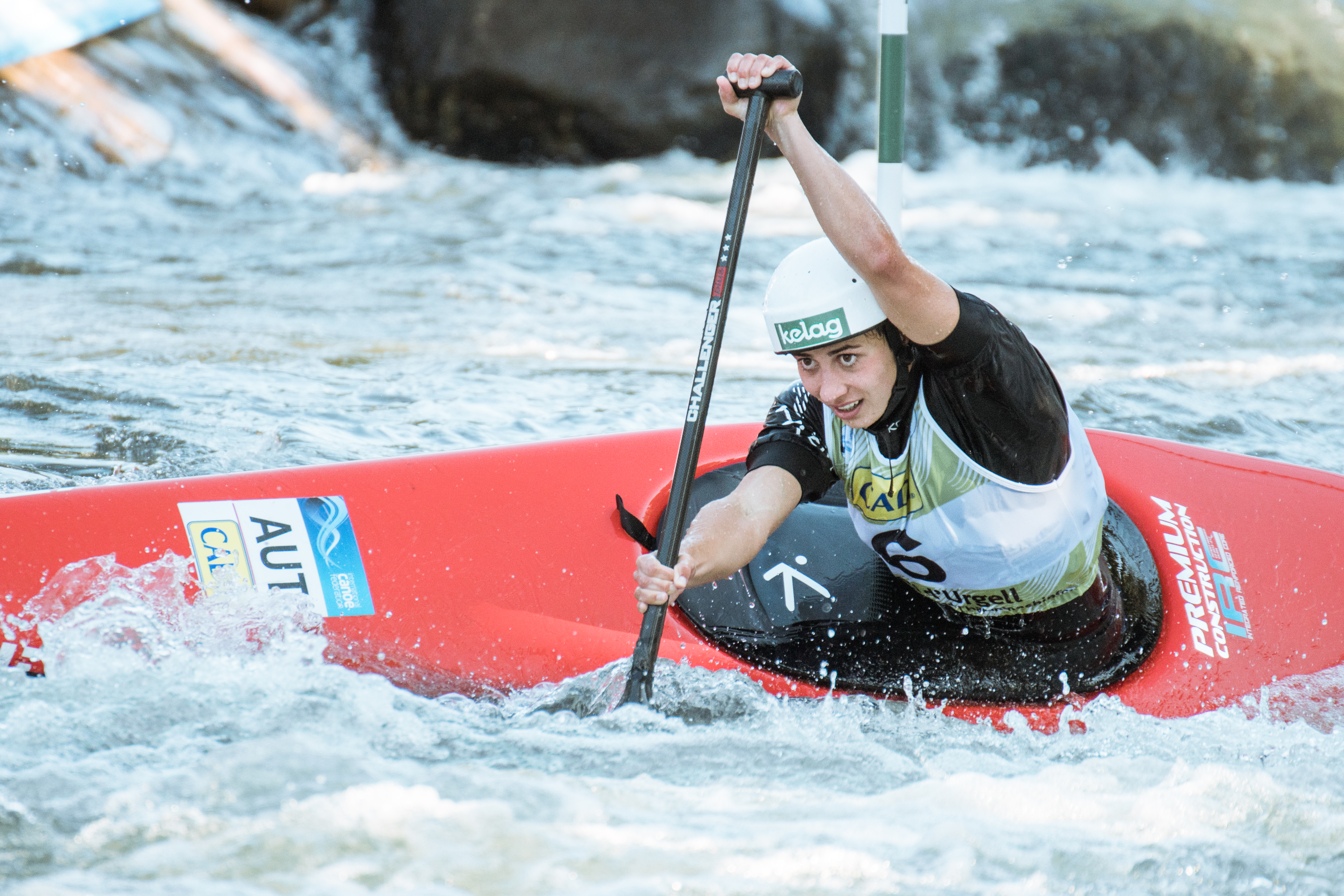

Personal information
- Nationality: Austrian
- Born: 18 April 1998 (age 28)

Sport
- Country: Austria
- Sport: Canoe slalom
- Event: C1
- Club: KVK
Medal record
Women's canoe slalom
Representing Austria
World Championships
| Bronze medal – third place | 2015 London | C1 team |
| Bronze medal – third place | 2019 La Seu d'Urgell | C1 |
European Championships
| Bronze medal – third place | 2017 Tacen | C1 |
Youth Olympic Games
| Gold medal – first place | 2014 Nanjing | C1 |
U23 World Championships
| Gold medal – first place | 2018 Ivrea | C1 |
U23 European Championships
| Bronze medal – third place | 2017 Hohenlimburg | C1 |
Junior European Championships
| Gold medal – first place | 2015 Kraków | C1 |
| Silver medal – second place | 2013 Bourg-Saint-Maurice | C1 |

Nadine Weratschnig (born 18 April 1998) is an Austrian slalom canoeist who has competed at the international level since 2013.

She won two bronze medals at the ICF Canoe Slalom World Championships, earning them in 2015 (C1 team) and 2019 (C1). She also won a bronze medal in the C1 event at the 2017 European Championships in Tacen. She represented Austria at the delayed 2020 Summer Olympics in Tokyo, finishing fifth in the C1 event.

Weratschnig is one of only a few female C1 paddlers who does not switch. She paddles on the right side and uses the crossbow stroke on the left side.

Her twin sister Nina is also a slalom canoeist.

== World Cup individual podiums ==
| Season | Date | Venue | Position | Event |
|---|---|---|---|---|
| 2017 | 9 Sep 2017 | La Seu d'Urgell | 3rd | C1 |
| 2018 | 9 Sep 2018 | La Seu d'Urgell | 3rd | C1 |
| 2021 | 20 Jun 2021 | Markkleeberg | 3rd | C1 |
