= Maria Ferekidi =

Greek canoeist (born 1981)

Maria Ferekidi (born 2 December 1981 in Athens) is a Greek slalom canoeist who has competed since the early 2000s. At the 2004 Summer Olympics in Athens, she was eliminated in the qualifying round of the K-1 event, finishing in 17th place. Four years later in Beijing, Ferekidi was eliminated in the semifinals of the same event where she was classified in 11th place.
