= Canoeing at the 2022 Asian Games – Men's slalom C-1 =

Men's C-1 at the 2022 Asian Games
- Venue: Fuyang Water Sports Centre
- Date: 5–6 October 2023
- Competitors: 13 from 8 nations

Medalists
gold medal	Xie Yuancong	China
silver medal	Anvar Klevleev	Uzbekistan
bronze medal	Alexandr Kulikov	Kazakhstan

The men's slalom C-1 (canoe single) competition at the 2022 Asian Games was held from 5 to 6 October 2023. Each NOC could enter two athletes but only one of them could advance to the final.

== Schedule ==
All times are China Standard Time (UTC+08:00)

Date	Time	Event
Thursday, 5 October 2023	09:30	Heats 1st
Thursday, 5 October 2023	15:00	Heats 2nd
Friday, 6 October 2023	09:00	Semifinal
Friday, 6 October 2023	14:00	Final

== Results ==
Legend

- DNF — Did not finish
- DNS — Did not start

=== Heats 1st ===
Rank	Athlete	Time	Pen.	Total
1	Anvar Klevleev (UZB)	92.44	0	92.44
2	Alexandr Kulikov (KAZ)	95.85	0	95.85
3	Xie Yuancong (CHN)	94.94	2	96.94
4	Kuanysh Yerengaipov (KAZ)	97.14	0	97.14
5	Shota Saito (JPN)	97.75	0	97.75
6	Shota Sasaki (JPN)	97.59	2	99.59
7	Alibek Temirgaliev (UZB)	96.48	4	100.48
8	Wu Jung-cheng (TPE)	100.24	4	104.24
9	Yutthakan Chaidet (THA)	103.06	2	105.06
10	Nantipat Ongchit (THA)	108.32	0	108.32
11	Vishal Kewat (IND)	134.09	10	144.09
12	Baek Jeong-hyeon (KOR)	206.67	160	366.67
13	Baik Seung-cheol (KOR)	167.37	512	679.37

=== Heats 2nd ===
Rank	Athlete	Time	Pen.	Total
1	Alibek Temirgaliev (UZB)	95.38	4	99.38
2	Wu Jung-cheng (TPE)	100.52	2	102.52
3	Yutthakan Chaidet (THA)	104.01	4	108.01
4	Vishal Kewat (IND)	119.14	12	131.14
5	Nantipat Ongchit (THA)	114.34	56	170.34
6	Baik Seung-cheol (KOR)	164.47	110	274.47
7	Baek Jeong-hyeon (KOR)	217.10	68	285.10

=== Semifinal ===
Rank	Athlete	Time	Pen.	Total
1	Shota Sasaki (JPN)	97.20	0	97.20
2	Xie Yuancong (CHN)	97.50	2	99.50
3	Shota Saito (JPN)	101.41	0	101.41
4	Anvar Klevleev (UZB)	99.49	2	101.49
5	Alexandr Kulikov (KAZ)	100.79	2	102.79
6	Alibek Temirgaliev (UZB)	103.54	2	105.54
7	Kuanysh Yerengaipov (KAZ)	101.68	6	107.68
8	Yutthakan Chaidet (THA)	108.48	0	108.48
9	Nantipat Ongchit (THA)	116.75	6	122.75
10	Vishal Kewat (IND)	134.15	56	190.15
11	Wu Jung-cheng (TPE)	114.66	304	418.66
—	Baik Seung-cheol (KOR)		210	DNF
—	Baek Jeong-hyeon (KOR)		100	DNF

=== Final ===
Rank	Athlete	Time	Pen.	Total
1st place, gold medalist(s)	Xie Yuancong (CHN)	98.20	0	98.20
2nd place, silver medalist(s)	Anvar Klevleev (UZB)	96.63	2	98.63
3rd place, bronze medalist(s)	Alexandr Kulikov (KAZ)	97.04	4	101.04
4	Shota Sasaki (JPN)	99.98	4	103.98
5	Yutthakan Chaidet (THA)	109.37	2	111.37
6	Wu Jung-cheng (TPE)	118.60	6	124.60
7	Vishal Kewat (IND)	135.12	104	239.12
—	Baik Seung-cheol (KOR)			DNS
