= 2016 Asian Canoe Slalom Championships =

Canoeing competition in Toyama, Japan

- Host city: Toyama, Japan
- Dates: 23–24 April 2016

The 2016 Asian Canoe Slalom Championships was the 9th edition of the Asian Canoe Slalom Championships. The event took place from 23 to 24 April 2016 in Toyama, Japan. The event was the only Asian qualification for the 2016 Summer Olympics in Rio de Janeiro.

== Medal summary ==
=== Individual ===
Event	Gold	Silver	Bronze
Men's C-1	Shu Jianming; China	Kazuya Taniguchi; Japan	Kuanysh Yerengaipov; Kazakhstan
Men's C-2	Japan; Shota Sasaki; Tsubasa Sasaki	China; Zhang Hang; Deng Xiao	Uzbekistan; Ismoilbek Abdumanapov; Alibek Temirgaliev
Men's K-1	Tan Ya; China	Martin Stanovský; Kazakhstan	Tsubasa Sasaki; Japan
Women's C-1	Chen Wei-han; Chinese Taipei	Ayano Sato; Japan	Atcharaporn Duanglawa; Thailand
Women's K-1	Li Lu; China	Ren Mishima; Japan	Xeniya Kondratenko; Kazakhstan

=== Team ===
Event	Gold	Silver	Bronze
Men's C-1	China; Wang Sheng; Shu Jianming; Chen Fangjia	Kazakhstan; Alexandr Kulikov; Kuanysh Yerengaipov; Pavel Zinovyev	Chinese Taipei; Liu Chin-han; Chang Yun-chuan; Chiu Huai-chun
Men's C-2	Uzbekistan; Sirojiddin Kuchkorov; Muhibillo Ergashev; Alisher Kamolov; Shoxruxmirzo Shamsiboev; Ismoilbek Abdumanapov; Alibek Temirgaliev	China; Yu Hongmin; Chen Jin; Zhang Hang; Deng Xiao; Chen Fei; Shan Bao	Chinese Taipei; Chang Yun-chuan; Liu Chin-han; Chiu Huai-chun; Chen Bo-wun; Pan Hung-ming; Wu Tai-yi
Men's K-1	Japan; Kazuya Adachi; Tsubasa Sasaki; Taku Yoshida	China; Quan Xin; Huang Cunguang; Tan Ya	Kazakhstan; Martin Stanovský; Pyotr Volkov; Pavel Zinovyev
Women's C-1	Kazakhstan; Xeniya Kondratenko; Kamilla Safina; Yekaterina Smirnova	Chinese Taipei; Chen Wei-han; Chung Yu-han; Rao Chih-shuan	Thailand; Atcharaporn Duanglawa; Thatchaporn Pornchai; Sirijit Onnom
Women's K-1	Japan; Yuriko Takeshita; Haruka Okazaki; Ren Mishima	Kazakhstan; Yekaterina Smirnova; Xeniya Kondratenko; Kamilla Safina	Chinese Taipei; Chang Chu-han; Liu Jen-yu; Chou Chih-chin

== Medal table ==
Rank	Nation	Gold	Silver	Bronze	Total
1	China	4	3	0	7
2	Japan	3	3	1	7
3	Kazakhstan	1	3	3	7
4	Chinese Taipei	1	1	3	5
5	Uzbekistan	1	0	1	2
6	Thailand	0	0	2	2
Totals (6 entries)		10	10	10	30
