= Nagwa El Desouki =

Swiss slalom canoer

Nagwa El Desouki (born 2 April 1971 in Altstätten) is a Swiss slalom canoeist who competed from the mid-1990s to the late 2000s (decade). Competing in two Summer Olympics, she earned her best finish of sixth in the K-1 event in Athens in 2004.
