= Shu Jianming =

Chinese slalom canoeist (born 1990)

Personal information
- Nationality: Chinese
- Born: 26 January 1990 (age 36) Xichang, Sichuan
- Height: 1.80 m (5 ft 11 in)
- Weight: 75 kg (165 lb)

Sport
- Country: China
- Sport: Canoeing
Medal record
Men's canoe slalom
Representing China
Asian Championships
Gold medal – first place	2016 Toyama	C1
Gold medal – first place	2016 Toyama	C1 team

Shu Jianming (Chinese: 舒建明; born 16 June 1990 in Xichang, Sichuan) is a Chinese slalom canoeist who has competed since 2008. He finished 14th in the C1 event at the 2016 Summer Olympics in Rio de Janeiro.
