= Louise Natoli =

Australian slalom canoeist (born 1979)

Louise Natoli (born 24 April 1979 in Melbourne) is an Australian slalom canoeist who competed from the mid-1990s to the late 2000s. She finished seventh in the K-1 event at the 2004 Summer Olympics in Athens.
