= Mathieu Doby =

French-born Belgian slalom canoeist

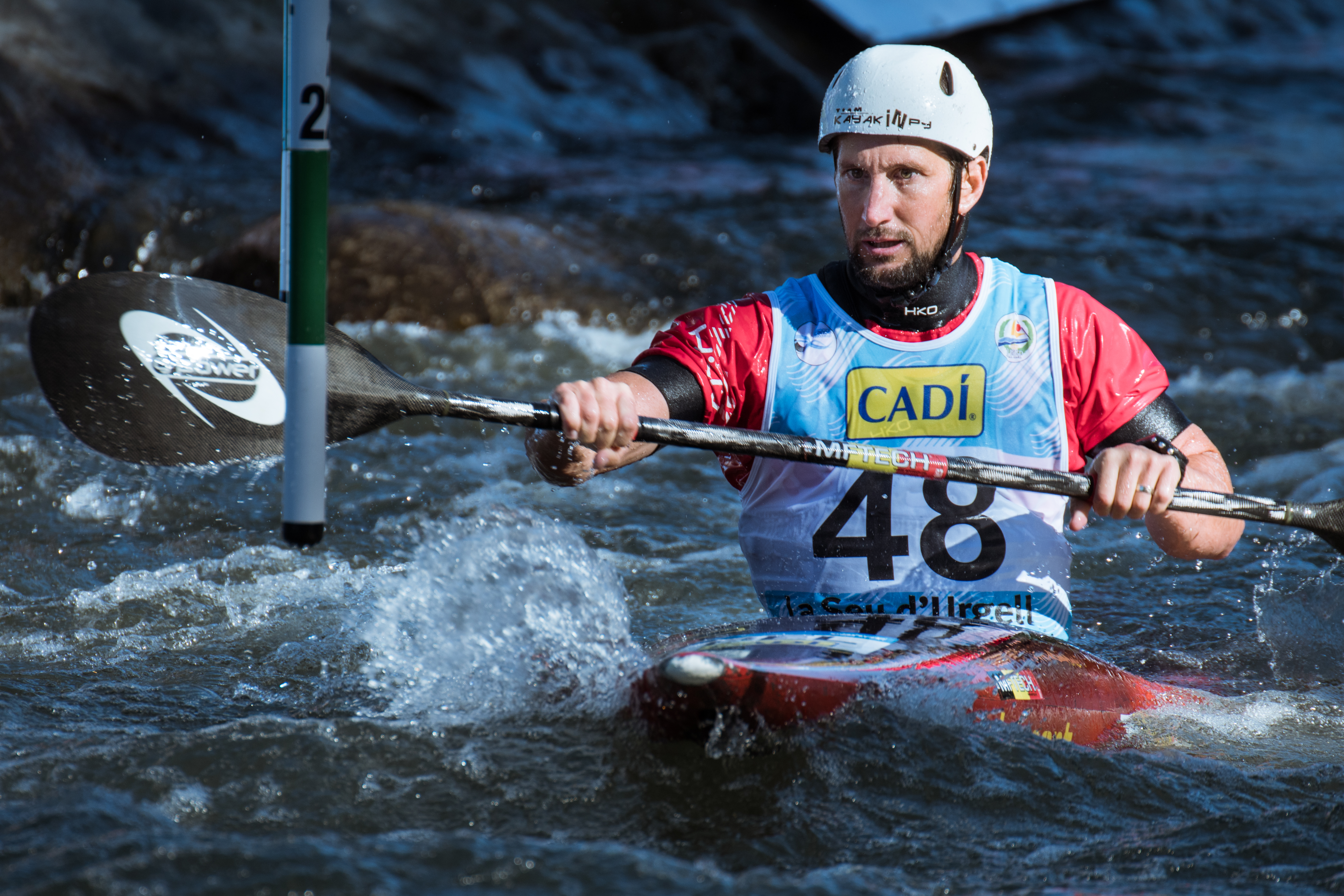
Mathieu Doby at the 2019 Canoe Slalom World Championships.

Mathieu Doby (born 3 May 1982 in Grenoble, France) is a French-born Belgian slalom canoeist who has competed at the international level since 2004, representing France. He has represented Belgium since 2007.

At the 2012 Summer Olympics he competed in the K1 event where he finished in 11th place after being eliminated in the semifinals.

== World Cup individual podiums ==
Season	Date	Venue	Position	Event
2015	15 Aug 2015	Pau	2nd	K1
