= Mathis Soudi =

Moroccan slalom canoeist (born 1999)

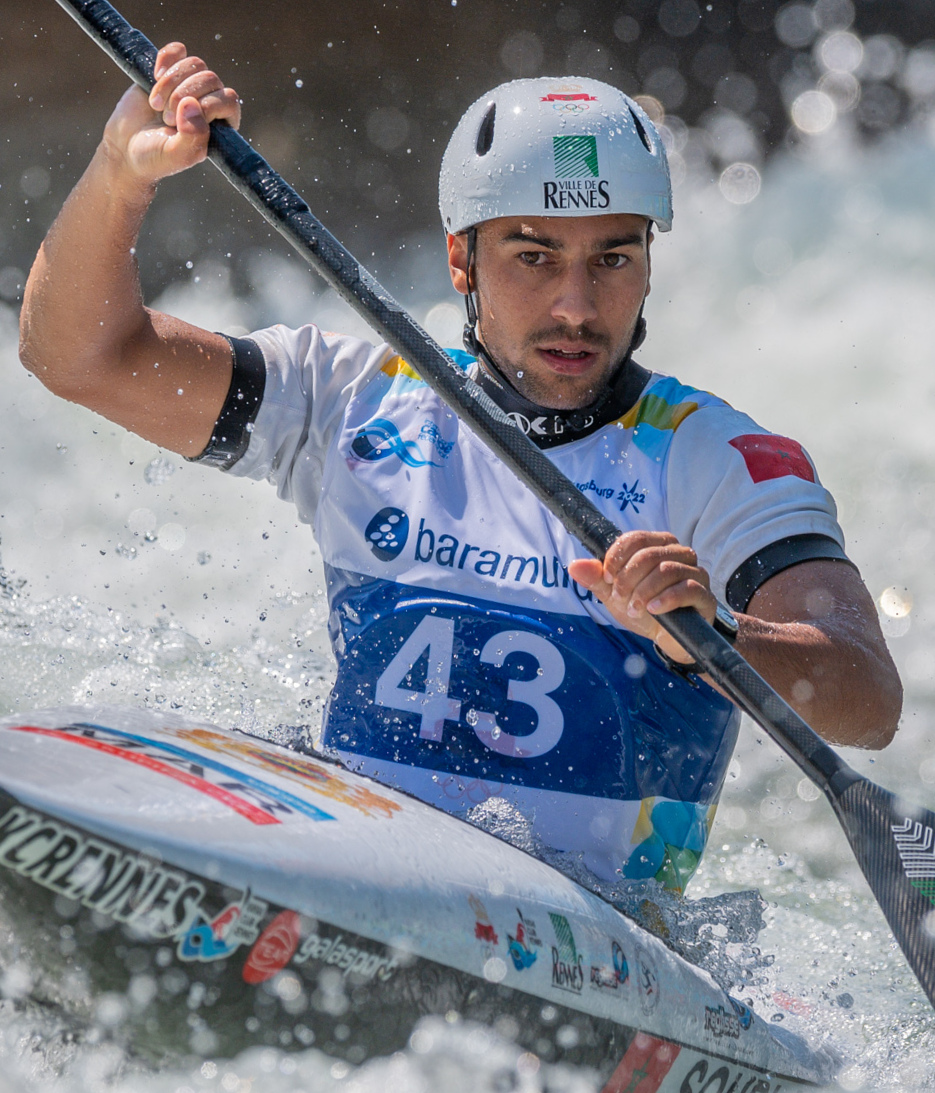
- 2022 ICF Canoe Slalom World Championships by Stefan Brending

Personal information
- Native name: ماتيس سودي
- Nationality: French, Moroccan
- Born: 26 November 1999 (age 26) Angers, France
- Home town: Rennes, France

Sport
- Country: Morocco
- Sport: Canoe slalom
- Event: K1. Kayak cross
- Club: Kayak Club de Rennes
- Coached by: Titouan Dupras
Medal record
Representing Morocco
World Championships
Bronze medal – third place	2023 London	K1

Mathis Soudi (Arabic: ماتيس سودي; born 26 November 1999) is a slalom canoeist specializing in K1 and kayakn cross. Born in France, he has competed for Morocco at international level since 2016. He is from Rennes, France.

Soudi won a bronze medal in the K1 event at the 2023 World Championships in London, becoming the first African paddler to win a medal at the ICF Canoe Slalom World Championships.

Soudi won a gold medal at the 2019 Arab Championships in Egypt. He finished in 22nd place at the 2016 Junior World Championships in Kraków and 16th the following year in Bratislava. He finished in 11th place at the 2020 World Cup in Pau.

Mathis represented Morocco in the K1 event at the delayed 2020 Summer Olympics in Tokyo, after he secured a quota place by finishing as the first eligible athlete at the African Olympic canoe slalom qualifiers in La Seu d'Urgell. With fellow Moroccan Célia Jodar competing in the women's K1 event, this marked the first time an African nation has sent both a male and female to compete in canoe slalom at the Games. Soudi set the 7th fastest time in the first run of the heats, qualifying in 15th place for the semifinal. He finished in 18th place overall.

He also competed at the 2024 Summer Olympics, finishing 16th in the K1 event and 33rd in kayak cross.
