= Canoeing at the 2020 Summer Olympics – Women's slalom C-1 =

Olympic canoeing event

Women's slalom C-1 at the Games of the XXXII Olympiad
- Venue: Kasai Canoe Slalom Course
- Dates: 28 July 2021 (heats); 29 July 2021 (semifinal & final)
- Competitors: 22 from 22 nations
- Winning time: 105.04

Medalists
1st place, gold medalist(s)		Jessica Fox	Australia
2nd place, silver medalist(s)		Mallory Franklin	Great Britain
3rd place, bronze medalist(s)		Andrea Herzog	Germany

The women's C-1 slalom canoeing event at the 2020 Summer Olympics took place on 28 and 29 July 2021 at the Kasai Canoe Slalom Course. 22 canoeists from 22 nations competed. The event was won by Jessica Fox from Australia, who already had three medals (one silver and two bronzes) in K-1 slalom from the 2012, 2016, and 2020 Olympics. Briton Mallory Franklin won silver, and German Andrea Herzog bronze. For both of them it was the first Olympic medal.

== Background ==
This was the debut appearance of the event, replacing the men's C-2. Previously, there had been three men's events (C-1, C-2, and K-1) and only one women's event (K-1) in slalom canoeing at the Olympics; as of 2020, both men and women will have the C-1 and K-1 events.

Reigning World Champion Andrea Herzog earned a place for, and has been selected to compete by, Germany.

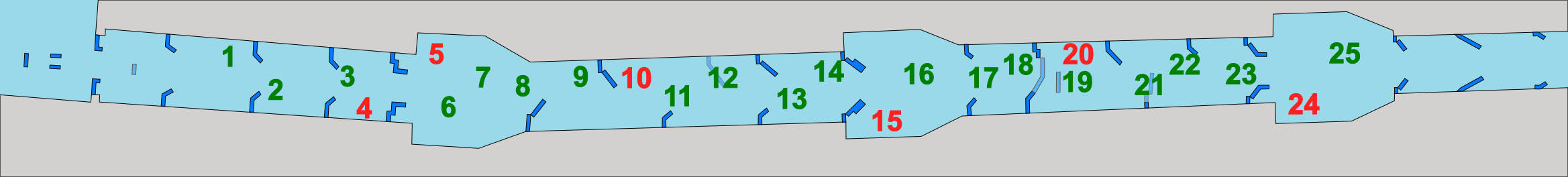
Slalom gate positions for Heats, Tokyo Olympics, 28 July 2021

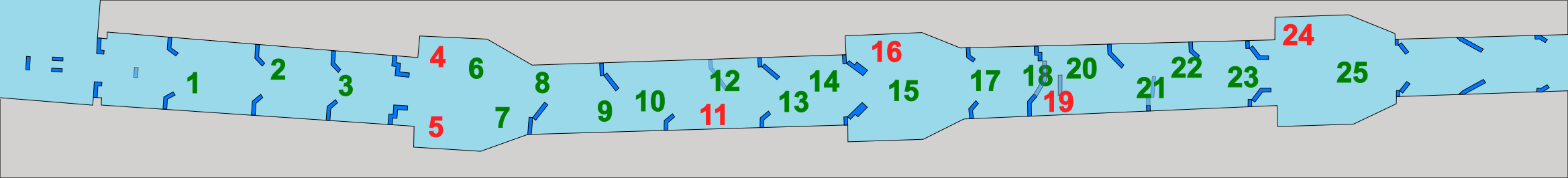
Slalom gate positions for Semifinals and Finals, Tokyo Olympics, 29 July 2021

== Qualification ==
A National Olympic Committee (NOC) could enter only 1 qualified canoeist in the women's slalom C-1 event. A total of 17 qualification places were available, allocated as follows:

- 1 place for the host nation, Japan
- 11 places awarded through the 2019 ICF Canoe Slalom World Championships
- 5 places awarded through continental tournaments, 1 per continent

Five additional athletes will compete, having already earned a quota in the Women's K1 event.

Qualifying places were awarded to the NOC, not to the individual canoeist who earned the place.

The World Championships quota places were allocated as follows:

Rank	Canoeist	Nation	Qualification	Selected competitor
1	Andrea Herzog	Germany	1st placed NOC	Andrea Herzog
2	Jessica Fox	Australia	2nd placed NOC	Jessica Fox
3	Nadine Weratschnig	Austria	4th placed NOC	Nadine Weratschnig
4	Evy Leibfarth	United States	3rd placed NOC	Evy Leibfarth
5	Klara Olazabal	Spain	5th placed NOC	Núria Vilarrubla
6	Tereza Fišerová	Czech Republic	6th placed NOC	Tereza Fišerová
8	Mònica Dòria	Andorra	Earned quota in K1	Mònica Dòria
9	Luuka Jones	New Zealand	Earned quota in K1	Luuka Jones
10	Ana Sátila	Brazil	7th placed NOC	Ana Sátila
11	Mallory Franklin	Great Britain	8th placed NOC	Mallory Franklin
15	Marta Bertoncelli	Italy	9th placed NOC	Marta Bertoncelli
17	Lucie Prioux	France	10th placed NOC	Marjorie Delassus
19	Alja Kozorog	Slovenia	11th placed NOC	Alja Kozorog
22	Viktoriia Us	Ukraine	Earned quota in K1	Viktoriia Us
24	Alsu Minazova	ROC	Earned quota in K1	Alsu Minazova
61	Jane Nicholas	Cook Islands	Earned quota in K1	Jane Nicholas

Continental and other places:

Nation	Canoeist	Qualification	Selected competitor
Japan	-	Host nation	Ayano Sato
Canada	Lois Betteridge	Americas quota^{[a]}	Haley Daniels
China	Huang Yanzhi	Asia quota	Chen Shi
Slovakia	Monika Škáchová	Europe quota	Monika Škáchová
Poland	-	Reallocation of Oceania quota	Aleksandra Stach
~~Hungary~~; Switzerland	-	Reallocation of Africa quota^{[b]}	~~Julia Schmid~~; Alena Marx

Notes
^{a} The quota for the Americas was allocated to the NOC with the highest-ranked eligible athlete, due to the cancellation of the 2021 Pan American Championships.
^{b} The Africa quota was initially reallocated to Hungary, but was further reallocated to Switzerland following the Hungarian Olympic Committee's decision to only send athletes vaccinated against COVID-19 to the Games, and Schmid's subsequent withdrawal.

== Competition format ==
Slalom canoeing uses a three-round format, with heats, semifinal, and final. In the heats, each canoeist has two runs at the course with the better time counting. The top 15 advance to the semifinal. In the semifinal, the canoeists get a single run; the top 10 advance to the final. The best time in the single-run final wins gold.

The canoe course is approximately 250 metres long, with up to 25 gates that the canoeist must pass in the correct direction. Penalty time is added for infractions such as passing on the wrong side or touching a gate. Runs typically last approximately 95 seconds.

== Schedule ==
All times are Japan Standard Time (UTC+9)

The women's slalom C-1 took place over two consecutive days.

Date	Time	Round
Wednesday, 28 July 2021	13:00	Heats
Thursday, 29 July 2021	14:00	Semifinal; Final

== Results ==
Rank	Bib	Canoeist	Nation	Preliminary Heats						Semifinal			Final		
Rank	Bib	Canoeist	Nation	1st Ride	Pen.	2nd Ride	Pen.	Best	Order	Time	Pen.	Order	Time	Pen.	Order
1st place, gold medalist(s)	1	Jessica Fox	Australia	109.96	4	110.93	4	109.96	5	110.59	0	1	105.04	0	1
2nd place, silver medalist(s)	2	Mallory Franklin	Great Britain	107.51	0	105.06	2	105.06	1	117.75	0	6	108.68	2	2
3rd place, bronze medalist(s)	4	Andrea Herzog	Germany	113.69	2	106.34	0	106.34	2	114.61	2	4	111.13	2	3
4	14	Marjorie Delassus	France	121.74	6	167.47	52	121.74	17	117.71	0	5	115.93	0	4
5	5	Nadine Weratschnig	Austria	112.47	0	115.56	2	112.47	6	119.69	0	7	119.41	2	5
6	6	Tereza Fišerová	Czech Republic	110.45	2	109.16	0	109.16	3	113.23	0	2	120.99	4	6
7	16	Viktoriia Us	Ukraine	123.97	2	119.05	0	119.05	15	122.12	2	9	124.85	2	7
8	7	Núria Vilarrubla	Spain	118.03	2	121.00	8	118.03	13	119.99	2	8	127.33	4	8
9	12	Monika Škáchová	Slovakia	125.65	2	116.85	2	116.85	12	124.87	2	10	129.39	6	9
10	3	Ana Sátila	Brazil	120.56	4	109.90	2	109.90	4	114.27	0	3	164.71	52	10
11	8	Mònica Dòria	Andorra	113.78	2	119.69	4	113.78	9	128.32	6	11	did not advance		
12	15	Alja Kozorog	Slovenia	124.08	4	113.07	0	113.07	8	129.72	2	12	did not advance		
13	10	Luuka Jones	New Zealand	116.55	0	115.19	2	115.19	11	130.39	6	13	did not advance		
14	11	Alsu Minazova	ROC	176.02	54	118.45	4	118.45	14	135.80	6	14	did not advance		
15	18	Marta Bertoncelli	Italy	121.83	0	113.91	2	113.91	10	145.71	2	15	did not advance		
16	21	Alena Marx	Switzerland	120.12	2	150.84	4	120.12	16	163.09	6	16	did not advance		
17	13	Chen Shi	China	127.36	2	124.15	0	124.05	18	164.99	12	17	did not advance		
18	9	Evy Leibfarth	United States	115.55	2	113.06	0	113.06	7	183.32	50	18	did not advance		
19	17	Aleksandra Stach	Poland	145.58	2	134.03	6	134.03	19	did not advance					
20	21	Ayano Sato	Japan	161.77	8	151.03	10	151.03	20	did not advance					
21	22	Jane Nicholas	Cook Islands	151.95	6	205.74	62	151.95	21	did not advance					
22	19	Haley Daniels	Canada	152.98	8	191.00	56	152.98	22	did not advance					
