= Tsubasa Sasaki =

Japanese slalom canoeist (born 1983)

Medal record

Men's canoe slalom

Representing Japan

Asian Championships
Gold medal – first place	2016 Toyama	C2
Gold medal – first place	2016 Toyama	K1 team
Silver medal – second place	2013 Shuili	C2
Bronze medal – third place	2016 Toyama	K1

Tsubasa Sasaki (佐々木翼, Sasaki Tsubasa, born 23 March 1995) is a Japanese slalom canoeist who has competed at the international since 2010.

He finished 12th in the C2 event at the 2016 Summer Olympics in Rio de Janeiro together with Shota Sasaki.
