= Canoeing at the 2012 Summer Olympics – Men's slalom K-1 =

Men's canoe slalom K-1 at the Games of the XXX Olympiad
- Venue: Lee Valley White Water Centre
- Date: 29 July – 1 August
- Competitors: 22 from 22 nations
- Winning time: 93.43

Medalists
1st place, gold medalist(s)		Daniele Molmenti	Italy
2nd place, silver medalist(s)		Vavřinec Hradilek	Czech Republic
3rd place, bronze medalist(s)		Hannes Aigner	Germany

The men's canoe slalom K-1 competition at the 2012 Olympic Games in London took place between 29 July and 1 August at the Lee Valley White Water Centre.

Twenty-two canoeists from 22 countries competed. Daniele Molmenti of Italy won the gold medal.

== Competition format ==
The competition started with heats. Each athlete ran the course twice and the best of these two scores determined the 15 qualifiers for the semi-finals. In the semi-final each canoeist ran the course once. The 10 best scores qualified for the final, which was also one run down the course. The canoeist with the best score won the gold medal.

== Schedule ==
All times are British Summer Time (UTC+01:00)

Date	Time	Round
Sunday 29 July 2012	14:24 & 16:36	Heats
Wednesday 1 August 2012	13:30	Semi-final
Wednesday 1 August 2012	15:15	Final

1st gate set, preliminary heats, July 29, 30.

2nd gate set, semi- & finals, July 31, August 1, 2.

== Results ==
Order	Name	Preliminary Heats						Semifinal			Final		
Order	Name	1st Ride	Pen.	2nd Ride	Pen.	Best	Order	Time	Pen.	Order	Time	Pen.	Order
1st place, gold medalist(s)	Daniele Molmenti (ITA)	91.40	2	88.68	2	88.68	9	96.37	0	3	93.43	0	1
2nd place, silver medalist(s)	Vavřinec Hradilek (CZE)	87.44	0	87.66	0	87.44	3	99.58	2	8	94.78	0	2
3rd place, bronze medalist(s)	Hannes Aigner (GER)	92.56	2	83.49	0	83.49	1	97.60	2	5	94.92	0	3
4	Mateusz Polaczyk (POL)	88.51	2	88.60	2	88.51	7	96.36	0	2	96.14	0	4
5	Samuel Hernanz (ESP)	87.07	0	91.25	2	87.07	2	97.18	0	4	96.95	0	5
6	Peter Kauzer (SLO)	90.98	2	88.10	0	88.10	5	96.02	2	1	101.01	6	6
7	Étienne Daille (FRA)	90.12	0	241.73	152	90.12	13	100.55	0	10	101.87	2	7
8	Helmut Oblinger (AUT)	88.81	0	92.66	2	88.81	10	98.99	0	7	104.28	2	8
9	Kazuki Yazawa (JPN)	96.66	2	92.57	0	92.57	15	99.99	0	9	104.44	0	9
10	Benjamin Boukpeti (TOG)	95.28	4	90.52	0	90.52	14	98.13	0	6	154.23	54	10
11	Mathieu Doby (BEL)	92.74	2	87.92	0	87.92	4	102.58	2	11	did not advance		
12	Richard Hounslow (GBR)	94.40	4	89.12	0	89.12	11	104.30	2	12	did not advance		
13	Michael Kurt (SUI)	88.14	0	88.48	4	88.14	6	147.35	50	13	did not advance		
14	Eoin Rheinisch (IRL)	89.97	0	90.72	0	89.97	12	153.98	50	14	did not advance		
15	Michael Dawson (NZL)	90.90	4	88.58	0	88.58	8	207.63	100	15	did not advance		
16	Scott Parsons (USA)	94.16	2	141.72	52	94.16	16	did not advance					
17	Huang Cunguang (CHN)	94.40	0	94.54	4	94.40	17	did not advance					
18	Warwick Draper (AUS)	95.20	2	95.08	2	95.08	18	did not advance					
19	Hermann Husslein (THA)	100.67	4	95.11	4	95.11	19	did not advance					
20	Michael Tayler (CAN)	155.89	54	97.64	2	97.64	20	did not advance					
21	Jonathan Akinyemi (NGR)	104.70	8	146.95	52	104.70	21	did not advance					
22	Dinko Mulić (CRO)	293.58	202	143.28	52	143.28	22	did not advance					
