= Monika Škáchová =

Slovak slalom canoeist

Personal information
- Nationality: Slovak
- Born: 22 November 1999 (age 26) Liptovský Mikuláš, Slovakia
- Height: 1.74 m (5 ft 9 in)
- Weight: 68 kg (150 lb)

Sport
- Country: Slovakia
- Sport: Canoe slalom
- Event: C1
Medal record
Women's canoe slalom
Representing Slovakia
European Championships
Gold medal – first place	2021 Ivrea	C1 team
U23 World Championships
Bronze medal – third place	2019 Kraków	C1
U23 European Championships
Gold medal – first place	2018 Bratislava	C1
Bronze medal – third place	2017 Hohenlimburg	C1 team
Bronze medal – third place	2018 Bratislava	C1 team
Bronze medal – third place	2019 Liptovský Mikuláš	C1 team
Junior World Championships
Silver medal – second place	2017 Bratislava	C1 team
Junior European Championships
Gold medal – first place	2017 Hohenlimburg	C1 team
Bronze medal – third place	2015 Kraków	C1 team

Monika Škáchová (born 22 November 1999) is a Slovak slalom canoeist who has competed at the international level since 2014, specializing in the C1 event.

Škáchová is one of only a few female C1 paddlers who does not switch her grip on the paddle. She paddles on the right side and uses the crossbow stroke on the left side.

== Career ==
Škáchová won a gold medal in the C1 team event at the 2021 European Championships in Ivrea.

Škáchová was selected for the Slovak team for the C1 event at the delayed 2020 Summer Olympics in Tokyo where she qualified for the final and finished ninth.

She was named Female Slalom Canoeist of the Year for 2021 by Slovak Canoeing. Prior to that, in 2018 she had shared the award with Soňa Stanovská.

She finished fourth in the C1 event at the 2021 World Championships in Bratislava.

Škáchová missed the entire 2022 international season due to injury.

=== Major championships results timeline ===
Event		2016	2017	2018	2019	2020	2021
Olympic Games	C1	—	Not held				9
World Championships	C1	Not held	19	26	43	Not held	4
World Championships	C1 team	Not held	8	5	4	Not held	5
European Championships	C1	13	17	4	35	—	11
European Championships	C1 team	4	7	6	6	—	1
