= Marta Bertoncelli =

Italian canoeist (born 2001)

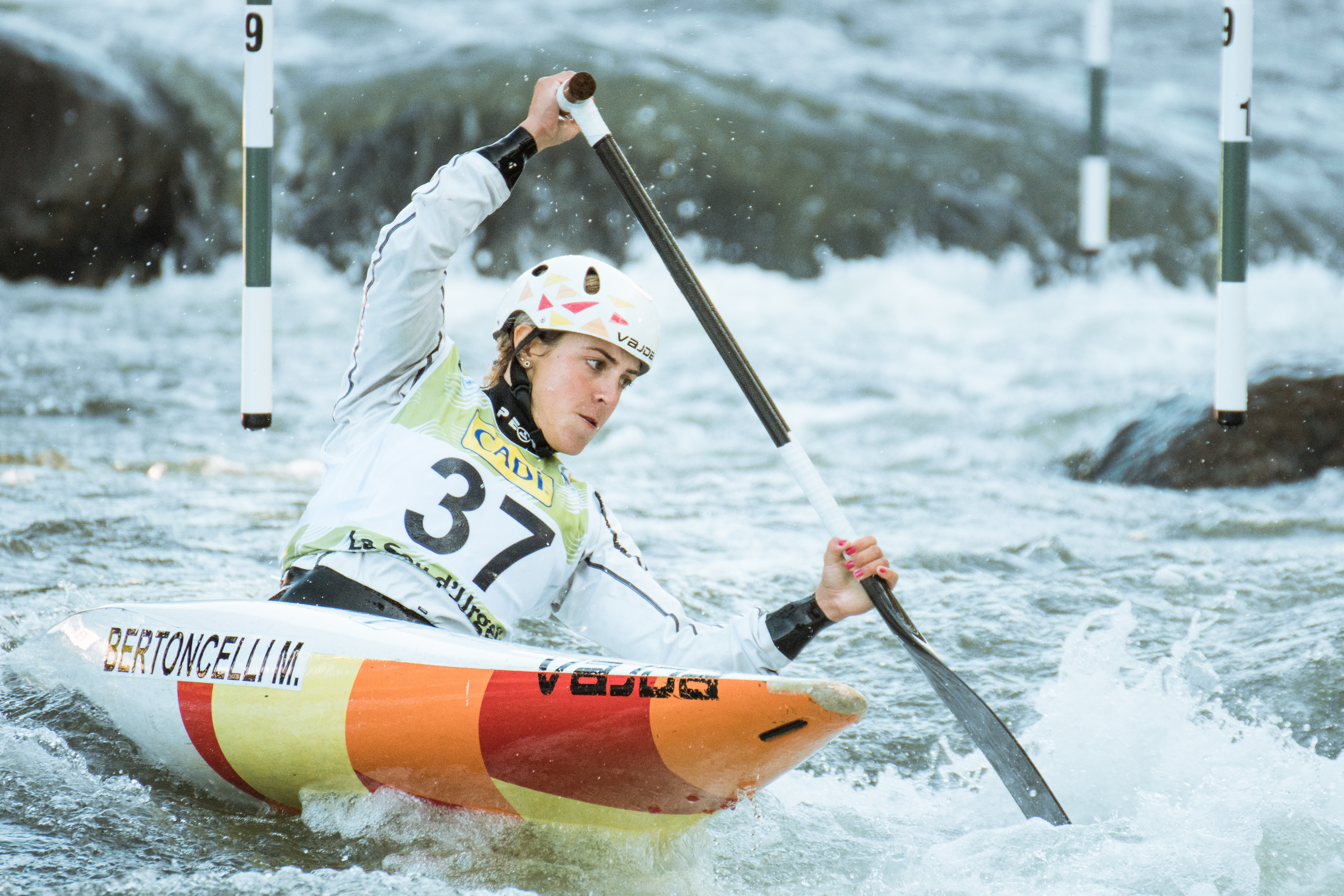
- Bertoncelli at the 2019 World Championships.

Personal information
- Nationality: Italian
- Born: 3 July 2001 Ferrara
- Height: 1.64 m (5 ft 5 in)
- Weight: 54 kg (119 lb)

Sport
- Country: Italy
- Sport: Canoe slalom
- Event: C1, K1
- Club: CS Carabinieri
- Coached by: Daniele Molmenti
Medal record
Women's canoe slalom
Representing Italy
European Championships
Gold medal – first place	2026 Ivrea	C1 team
Bronze medal – third place	2025 Vaires-sur-Marne	C1 team
U23 World Championships
Gold medal – first place	2024 Liptovský Mikuláš	C1 team
Silver medal – second place	2022 Ivrea	C1 team
Silver medal – second place	2024 Liptovský Mikuláš	C1
Bronze medal – third place	2023 Kraków	C1 team
U23 European Championships
Gold medal – first place	2024 Kraków	C1 team
Bronze medal – third place	2023 Bratislava	C1 team
Junior World Championships
Gold medal – first place	2019 Kraków	C1 team
Silver medal – second place	2018 Ivrea	C1
Bronze medal – third place	2017 Bratislava	C1
Bronze medal – third place	2018 Ivrea	K1 team
Bronze medal – third place	2019 Kraków	C1
Junior European Championships
Gold medal – first place	2019 Liptovský Mikuláš	C1 team

Marta Bertoncelli (born 3 July 2001) is an Italian slalom canoeist who has competed at the international level since 2016. She competed at the 2020 Summer Olympics and the 2024 Summer Olympics.

== Career ==
Marta finished 3rd in the C1 event at the 2017 Junior World Championships in Bratislava and 2nd in the same event in 2018 on her home course in Ivrea. At the 2019 Junior World Championships she won a gold medal in the C1 team event and a bronze medal in the C1 event.

In May 2021 with her place at the delayed 2020 Tokyo Olympics secured following her performance at the 2019 World Championships in La Seu d'Urgell, she was honoured by Stefano Bonaccini, the president of the Emilia-Romagna region for her achievements. She competed in the debut appearance of the women's C1 event, after it was introduced for the 2020 games. She finished in 15th place in Tokyo after being eliminated in the semifinal. She also competed at the 2024 Summer Olympics in Paris, finishing 18th in the C1 event and 20th in kayak cross.

She won two medals (1 gold and 1 bronze) in the C1 team event at the European Championships.

Bertoncelli achieved her best World Championship result of 5th in the C1 event in 2022.

=== World Cup individual podiums ===
Season	Date	Venue	Position	Event
2026	4 September 2026	Vaires-sur-Marne	3rd	C1

== Personal life ==
Her father Luca is the president of the Ferrara canoe club. She plays the ukulele in her free time.
