= Marcello Beda =

Italian slalom canoeist

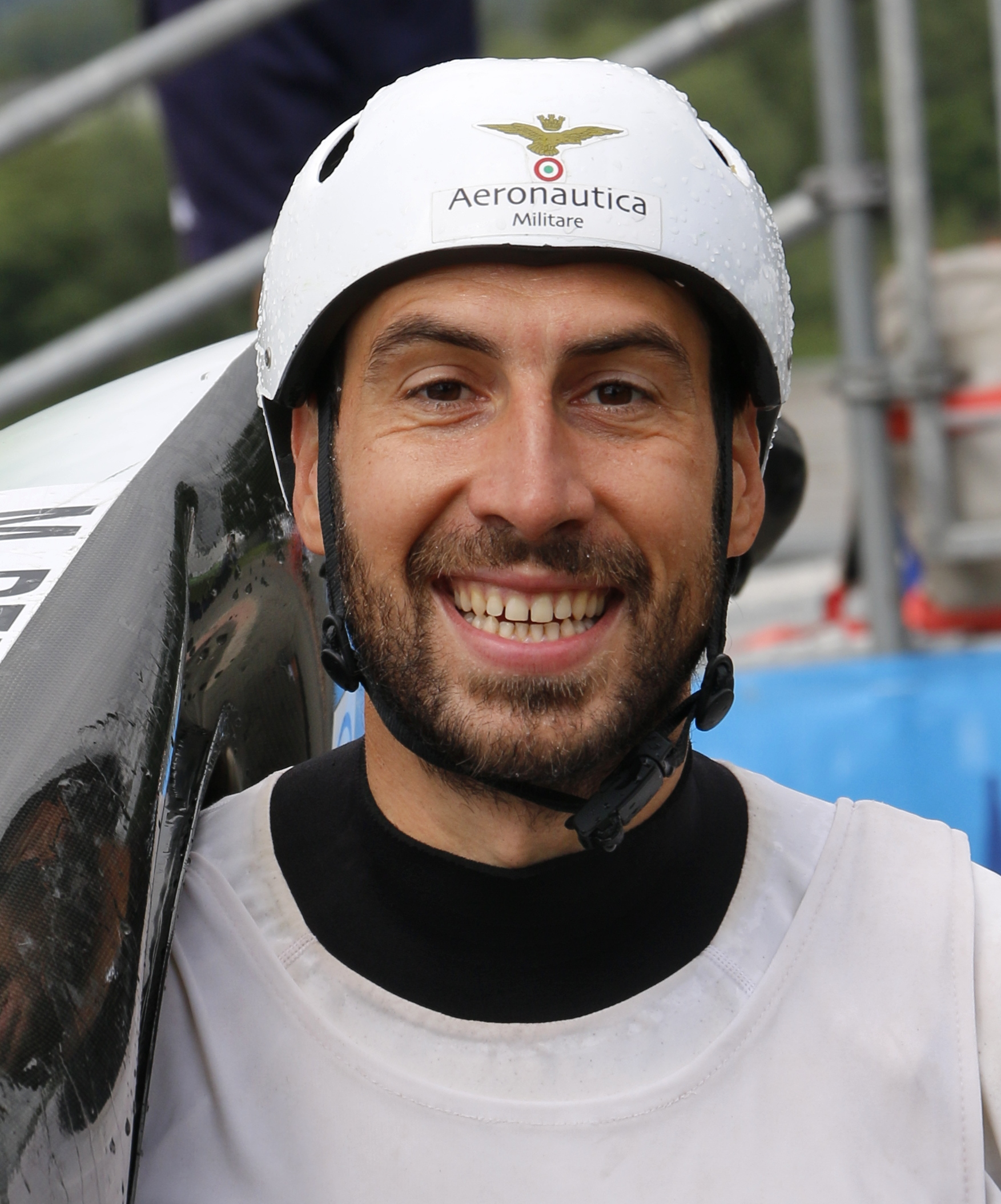

Personal information
- Nationality: Italian
- Born: 10 January 1995 (age 31)

Sport
- Country: Italy
- Sport: Canoe slalom
- Event: K1
Medal record
Men's canoe slalom
Representing Italy
World Championships
Silver medal – second place	2021 Bratislava	K1
U23 World Championships
Silver medal – second place	2018 Ivrea	K1 team
U23 European Championships
Silver medal – second place	2016 Solkan	K1 team
Bronze medal – third place	2015 Kraków	K1 team

Marcello Beda (born 10 January 1995) is an Italian slalom canoeist who has competed at the international level since 2012.

He won a silver medal in the K1 event at the 2021 World Championships in Bratislava.
