= Michael Tayler =

Canadian slalom canoeist (born 1992)

Personal information
- Born: February 6, 1992 (age 34) Calgary, Alberta, Canada
- Height: 175 cm (5 ft 9 in)
- Weight: 68 kg (150 lb)

Sport
- Country: Canada
- Sport: Canoe slalom
- Club: Ottawa River Runners
- Coached by: Michal Staniszewski

Michael Tayler (born February 6, 1992) is a Canadian slalom canoeist who has competed at the international level since 2008.

Tayler competed at three Summer Olympics. His first Olympic appearance came at the 2012 Summer Olympics in the K1 event, finishing in 20th place after being eliminated in the heats. He beat former world champion David Ford to earn the Canadian spot at the 2012 Olympics. In July 2016, he was officially named to Canada's Olympic team for the second time. He finished in 16th place in the K1 event at the 2016 Summer Olympics in Rio de Janeiro. He represented Canada again at the delayed 2020 Summer Olympics in Tokyo, where he finished 24th in the K1 event after being eliminated in the heats.

He was born in Calgary, Alberta.
