= Violetta Oblinger-Peters =

German-born, Austrian slalom canoeist (born 1977)

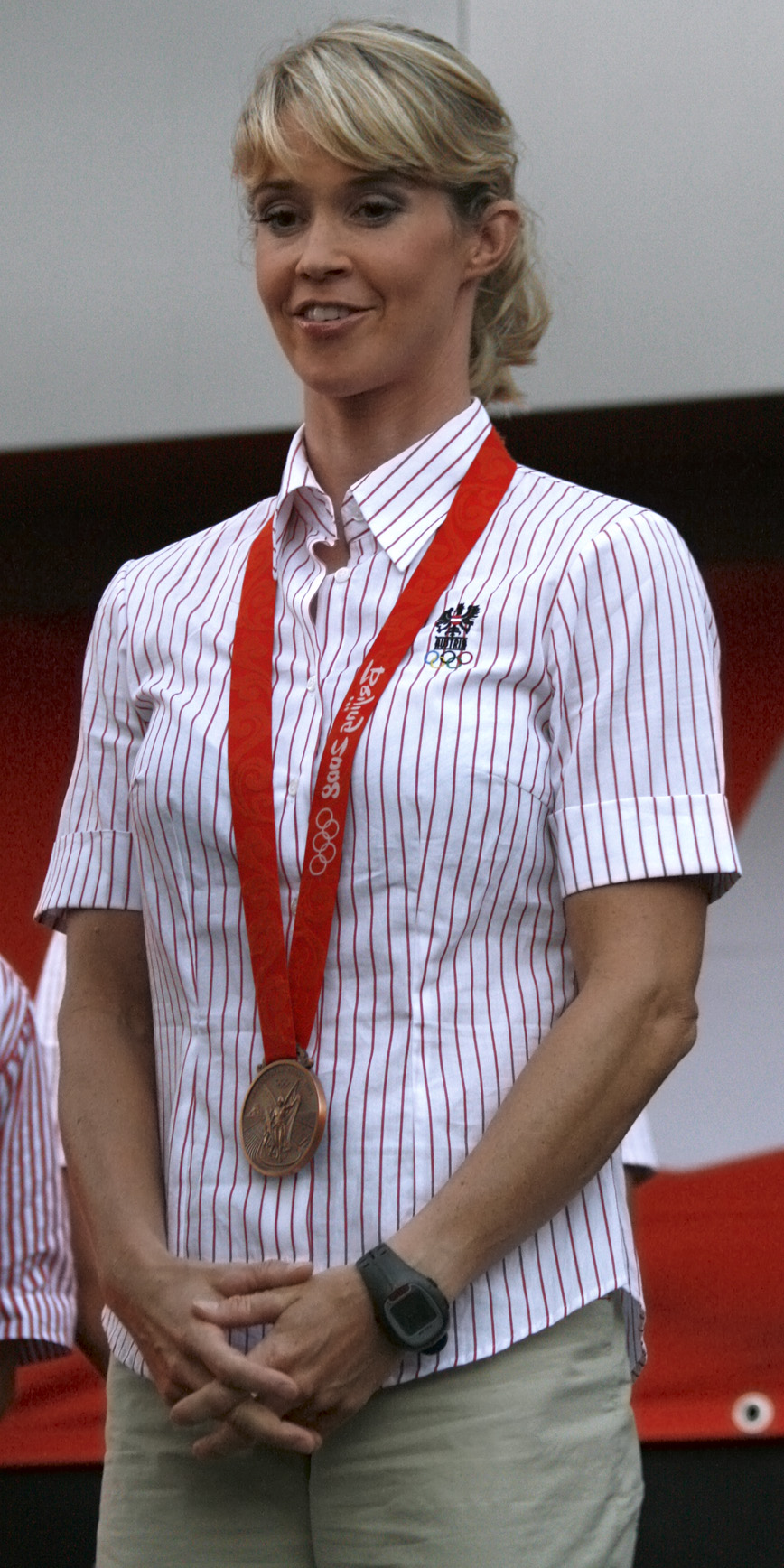
- Violetta Oblinger-Peters with her medal from the 2008 Summer Olympics in Beijing

Personal information
- Nationality: Austrian
- Born: 14 October 1977 (age 49) Schwerte, West Germany

Sport
- Country: Austria
- Sport: Canoe slalom
- Event: K1
Medal record
Women's canoe slalom
Representing Austria
Olympic Games
Bronze medal – third place	2008 Beijing	K1
World Championships
Bronze medal – third place	2005 Penrith	K1 team
Bronze medal – third place	2010 Tacen	K1
European Championships
Gold medal – first place	2007 Liptovský Mikuláš	K1
Silver medal – second place	2011 La Seu d'Urgell	K1 team
Bronze medal – third place	2005 Tacen	K1 team

Violetta Oblinger-Peters (born 14 October 1977 in Schwerte, North Rhine-Westphalia) is a German-born, Austrian slalom canoeist who has competed at the international level since 1995. Competing in three Summer Olympics, she won a bronze medal in the K1 event in Beijing in 2008.

Oblinger-Peters also won two bronze medals at the ICF Canoe Slalom World Championships (K1: 2010, K1 team: 2005). She won three medals at the European Championships (1 gold, 1 silver and 1 bronze).

Her husband, Helmut, competed at the Olympics, as did her father Wolfgang and uncle Ulrich.

In April 2009 she and her husband became parents of a boy.

== World Cup individual podiums ==
Season	Date	Venue	Position	Event
2001	10 Jun 2001	Tacen	3rd	K1
2002	28 Jul 2002	Tacen	2nd	K1
2003	3 Aug 2003	Bratislava	3rd	K1
2006	4 Jun 2006	Augsburg	3rd	K1
2007	30 Jun 2007	Prague	2nd	K1
2009	3 Aug 2009	Kananaskis	3rd	K1^{1}

^{1} Pan American Championship counting for World Cup points
