= Canoeing at the 2020 Summer Olympics – Men's slalom K-1 =

Olympic canoeing event

Men's slalom K-1 at the Games of the XXXII Olympiad
- Venue: Kasai Canoe Slalom Course
- Dates: 28 July 2021 (heats); 30 July 2021 (semifinal & final)
- Competitors: 24 from 24 nations
- Winning time: 91.63

Medalists
1st place, gold medalist(s)		Jiří Prskavec	Czech Republic
2nd place, silver medalist(s)		Jakub Grigar	Slovakia
3rd place, bronze medalist(s)		Hannes Aigner	Germany

The men's K-1 slalom canoeing event at the 2020 Summer Olympics took place on 28 and 30 July 2021 at the Kasai Canoe Slalom Course. 24 canoeists from 24 nations competed. Jiří Prskavec from the Czech Republic won the event, Jakub Grigar from Slovakia was second, and Hannes Aigner from Germany third. Prskavec and Aigner were bronze medalists in this event at the 2016 and 2012 Olympics, respectively; for Grigar, this is the first Olympic medal.

== Background ==
This was the ninth appearance of the event, having previously appeared in every Summer Olympics with slalom canoeing: 1972 and 1992–2016.

Reigning Olympic champion Joe Clarke did not make the Great Britain team, with that nation selecting Bradley Forbes-Cryans instead. Reigning World Champion Jiří Prskavec of the Czech Republic, who won bronze at the 2016 Games, earned a place for his nation.

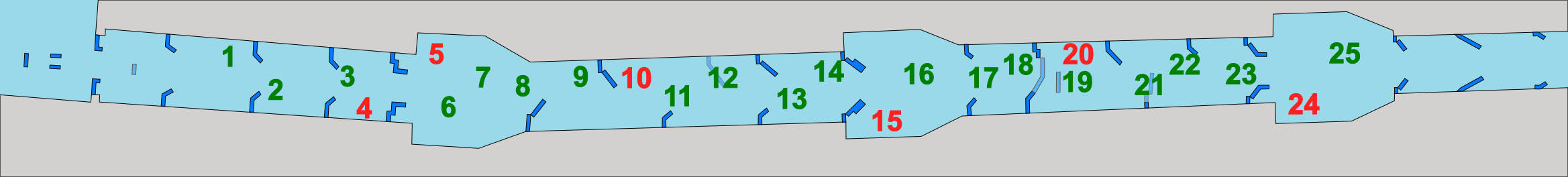
Slalom gate positions for Heats, Tokyo Olympics, 28 July 2021

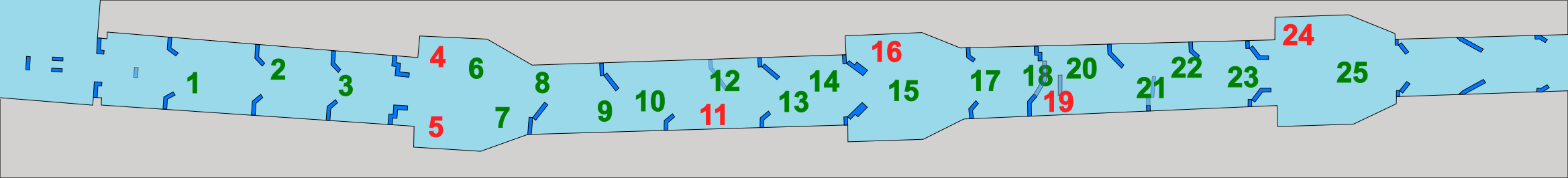
Slalom gate positions for Semifinals and Finals, Tokyo Olympics, 30 July 2021

== Qualification ==
A National Olympic Committee (NOC) could enter only 1 qualified canoeist in the men's slalom K-1 event. A total of 24 qualification places were available, allocated as follows:

- 1 place for the host nation, Japan
- 18 places awarded through the 2019 ICF Canoe Slalom World Championships
- 5 places awarded through continental tournaments, 1 per continent

Qualifying places were awarded to the NOC, not to the individual canoeist who earned the place.

The World Championships quota places were allocated as follows:

Rank	Canoeist	Nation	Qualification	Selected competitor
1	Jiří Prskavec	Czech Republic	1st placed NOC	Jiří Prskavec
2	David Llorente	Spain	2nd placed NOC	David Llorente
4	Bradley Forbes-Cryans	Great Britain	3rd placed NOC	Bradley Forbes-Cryans
7	Antoine Launay	Portugal	4th placed NOC	Antoine Launay
8	Lucien Delfour	Australia	5th placed NOC	Lucien Delfour
9	Pavel Eigel	ROC	6th placed NOC	Pavel Eigel
10	Jakub Grigar	Slovakia	7th placed NOC	Jakub Grigar
11	Quentin Burgi	France	8th placed NOC	Boris Neveu
12	Hannes Aigner	Germany	9th placed NOC	Hannes Aigner
14	Ben Hayward	Canada	10th placed NOC	Michael Tayler
15	Giovanni De Gennaro	Italy	11th placed NOC	Giovanni De Gennaro
16	Felix Oschmautz	Austria	12th placed NOC	Felix Oschmautz
19	Martin Dougoud	Switzerland	13th placed NOC	Martin Dougoud
21	Niko Testen	Slovenia	14th placed NOC	Peter Kauzer
22	Michal Smolen	United States	15th placed NOC	Michal Smolen
24	Pepe Gonçalves	Brazil	16th placed NOC	Pepe Gonçalves
26	Isak Öhrström	Sweden	17th placed NOC	Erik Holmer
31	Jack Dangen	New Zealand	18th placed NOC	Callum Gilbert

Continental and other places:

Nation	Canoeist	Qualification	Selected competitor
Japan	-	Host nation	Kazuya Adachi
Argentina	Thomas Bersinger	Americas quota^{[a]}	Lucas Rossi
China	Quan Xin	Asia quota	Quan Xin
Morocco	Mathis Soudi	Africa quota	Mathis Soudi
Poland	Krzysztof Majerczak	Europe quota	Krzysztof Majerczak
Belgium	-	Reallocation of Oceania quota	Gabriel De Coster

Notes
^{a} The quota for the Americas was allocated to the NOC with the highest-ranked eligible athlete, due to the cancellation of the 2021 Pan American Championships.

== Competition format ==
Slalom canoeing uses a three-round format, with heats, semifinal, and final. In the heats, each canoeist has two runs at the course with the better time counting. The top 20 advance to the semifinal. In the semifinal, the canoeists get a single run; the top 10 advance to the final. The best time in the single-run final wins gold.

The canoe course is approximately 250 metres long, with up to 25 gates that the canoeist must pass in the correct direction. Penalty time is added for infractions such as passing on the wrong side or touching a gate. Runs typically last approximately 95 seconds.

== Schedule ==
All times are Japan Standard Time (UTC+9)

The men's slalom K-1 took place over two separate days.

Date	Time	Round
Wednesday, 28 July 2021	13:00	Heats
Friday, 30 July 2021	14:00	Semifinal; Final

== Results ==
Qualification Rules: 1 to 20 to Semi-final, rest eliminated.

Qualification Rules: 1 to 10 to Final, rest eliminated.

Rank	Bib	Canoeist	Nation	Preliminary Heats						Semifinal			Final		
Rank	Bib	Canoeist	Nation	1st Ride	Pen.	2nd Ride	Pen.	Best	Order	Time	Pen.	Order	Time	Pen.	Order
1st place, gold medalist(s)	1	Jiří Prskavec	Czech Republic	92.57	0	91.71	2	91.71	4	94.29	2	1	91.63	0	1
2nd place, silver medalist(s)	8	Jakub Grigar	Slovakia	94.37	0	92.38	2	92.38	8	96.27	2	4	94.85	0	2
3rd place, bronze medalist(s)	2	Hannes Aigner	Germany	96.51	2	90.14	0	90.14	1	97.97	0	7	97.11	0	3
4	14	Felix Oschmautz	Austria	94.10	0	92.18	0	92.18	7	98.42	2	9	98.79	0	4
5	12	Michal Smolen	United States	96.61	4	102.03	4	96.61	19	96.11	0	3	99.12	0	5
6	9	Bradley Forbes-Cryans	Great Britain	93.65	0	101.46	4	93.65	13	96.48	0	5	100.58	2	6
7	6	Boris Neveu	France	147.12	50	91.78	0	91.78	5	94.86	0	2	101.18	4	7
8	4	Lucien Delfour	Australia	91.10	0	91.12	0	91.10	3	97.52	2	6	102.33	2	8
9	19	Erik Holmer	Sweden	100.36	4	94.91	2	94.91	16	98.45	0	10	148.59	52	9
10	10	David Llorente	Spain	147.62	50	95.83	2	95.83	18	98.26	0	8	150.08	52	10
11	11	Antoine Launay	Portugal	95.68	0	93.50	0	93.50	12	98.88	0	11	did not advance		
12	3	Peter Kauzer	Slovenia	93.04	0	105.64	2	93.04	11	99.10	0	12	did not advance		
13	7	Martin Dougoud	Switzerland	93.70	0	100.58	4	93.70	14	99.28	2	13	did not advance		
14	5	Giovanni De Gennaro	Italy	90.92	0	90.65	0	90.65	2	100.23	4	14	did not advance		
15	17	Krzysztof Majerczak	Poland	99.86	2	95.21	0	95.21	17	100.99	2	15	did not advance		
16	18	Kazuya Adachi	Japan	97.72	0	92.09	0	92.09	6	101.60	0	16	did not advance		
17	20	Quan Xin	China	98.86	2	98.06	2	98.06	20	101.99	2	17	did not advance		
18	22	Mathis Soudi	Morocco	93.86	0	100.92	2	93.86	15	103.58	6	18	did not advance		
19	15	Pepe Gonçalves	Brazil	98.13	4	92.91	2	92.91	10	104.33	6	19	did not advance		
20	13	Pavel Eigel	ROC	96.53	0	92.82	2	92.82	9	151.41	50	20	did not advance		
21	23	Lucas Rossi	Argentina	103.02	4	98.29	2	98.29	21	did not advance					
22	24	Gabriel De Coster	Belgium	152.94	54	98.67	0	98.67	22	did not advance					
23	16	Callum Gilbert	New Zealand	151.85	54	101.15	0	101.15	23	did not advance					
24	21	Michael Tayler	Canada	117.98	8	106.04	2	106.04	24	did not advance					
