= Don Giddens =

Don P. Giddens was the Dean of the College of Engineering at the Georgia Institute of Technology from 2002 to 2011. He is father of Olympic athlete Eric Giddens.

In 1996, he received the Robert Henry Thurston Lecture Award from the American Society of Mechanical Engineers. In 1999, Giddens was elected as a member into the National Academy of Engineering for contributions to the understanding of the ultrasound and fluid mechanics of arteriosclerosis, and enhancing academic bioengineering education.

He was the president of the American Society for Engineering Education for the 2011–2012 term.
