= Michal Smolen =

Polish-American slalom canoeist (born 1993)

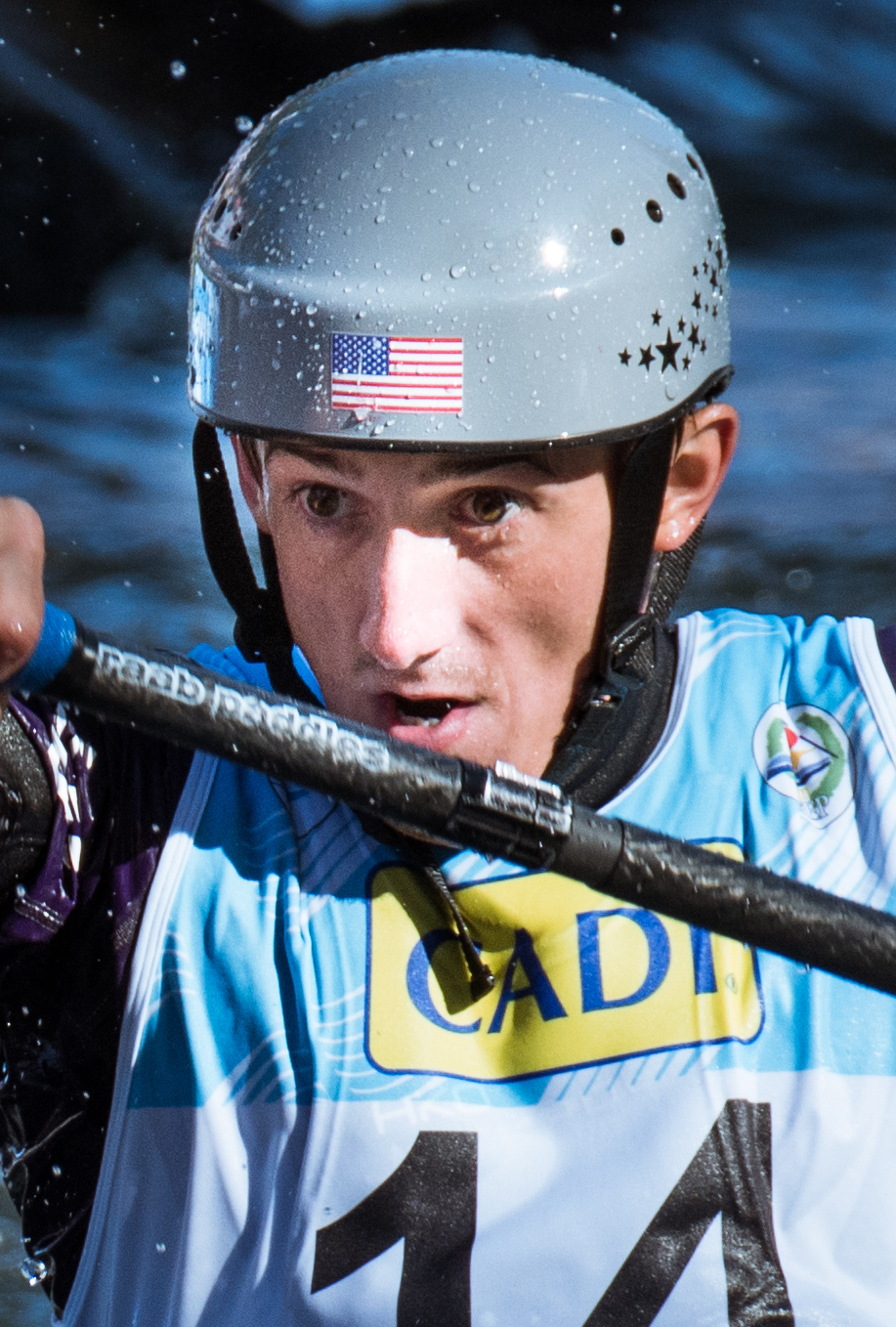
- Smolen in 2019

Personal information
- Born: 13 September 1993 (age 33) Kraków, Poland
- Home town: Charlotte, North Carolina, U.S.

Sport
- Sport: Canoeing
Medal record
Representing United States
World Championships
Bronze medal – third place	2015 London	K1
Pan American Games
Gold medal – first place	2015 Toronto	K1
U23 World Championships
Gold medal – first place	2014 Penrith	K1

Michal Smolen (born Michał Smoleń, September 13, 1993) is a Polish-American slalom canoeist who has competed at the international level since 2008 for the United States.

He won a bronze medal in the K1 event at the 2015 ICF Canoe Slalom World Championships in London.

Smolen participated at two Olympic Games. He finished 12th in the K1 event at the 2016 Summer Olympics in Rio de Janeiro. He qualified to represent the United States again at the delayed 2020 Summer Olympics in Tokyo, where he finished 5th in the K1 event.

Smolen's first major victory came at the 2014 Under 23 World Championship in Penrith where he won gold in the K1 event.

His father Rafał represented Poland in canoe slalom and his mother Agnieszka was a Polish national team handball player.

== World Cup individual podiums ==
Season	Date	Venue	Position	Event
2014	21 June 2014	Prague	3rd	K1
2017	2 September 2017	Ivrea	2nd	K1
2018	1 July 2018	Kraków	3rd	Kayak cross
