= Ariane Herde =

German-born, Dutch slalom canoer (born 1979)

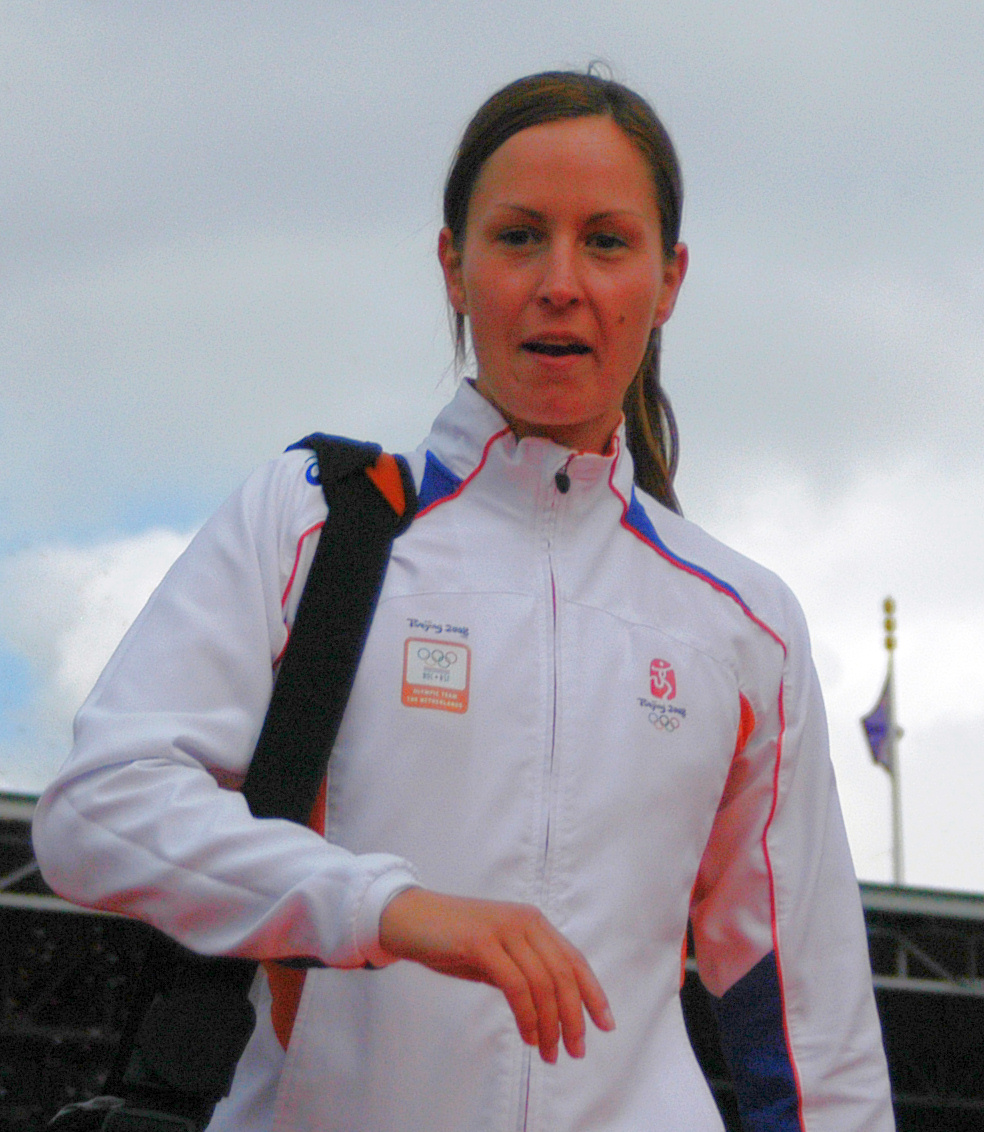
Herde at the Dutch 2008 Summer Olympics celebrations

Ariane Herde (born 18 December 1979, Iserlohn) is a German-born, Dutch slalom canoeist who competed from the late 1990s to the late 2000s. She finished sixth in the K-1 event at the 2008 Summer Olympics in Beijing.
