= Kazuki Yazawa =

Japanese canoneist (born 1989)

Medal record

Men's canoe slalom

Representing Japan

Asian Championships
Gold medal – first place	2013 Shuili	K1
Gold medal – first place	2013 Shuili	K1 team
Silver medal – second place	2010 Xiasi	K1 team
Bronze medal – third place	2010 Xiasi	K1

Kazuki Yazawa (矢澤 一輝, Yazawa Kazuki; born 4 March 1989 in Iida, Nagano) is a Japanese slalom canoeist who has competed at the international level since 2006.

At the 2008 Summer Olympics in Beijing, he was eliminated in the qualifying round of the K1 event finishing in 18th place. Four years later at the London games he was able to qualify for the final of the K1 event where he finished in 9th place.

Kazuki Yazawa also qualified for the 2016 Summer Olympics in Rio de Janeiro where it was reported that in addition to being an Olympian, he is also a Buddhist priest. He finished the K1 event in 11th place.

His sister Aki Yazawa is also an Olympic slalom canoeist.

== World Cup individual podiums ==
Season	Date	Venue	Position	Event
2008	18 May 2008	Nakhon Nayok	1st	K1^{1}

^{1} Asia Canoe Slalom Championship counting for World Cup points
