= Shota Sasaki =

Japanese canoeist

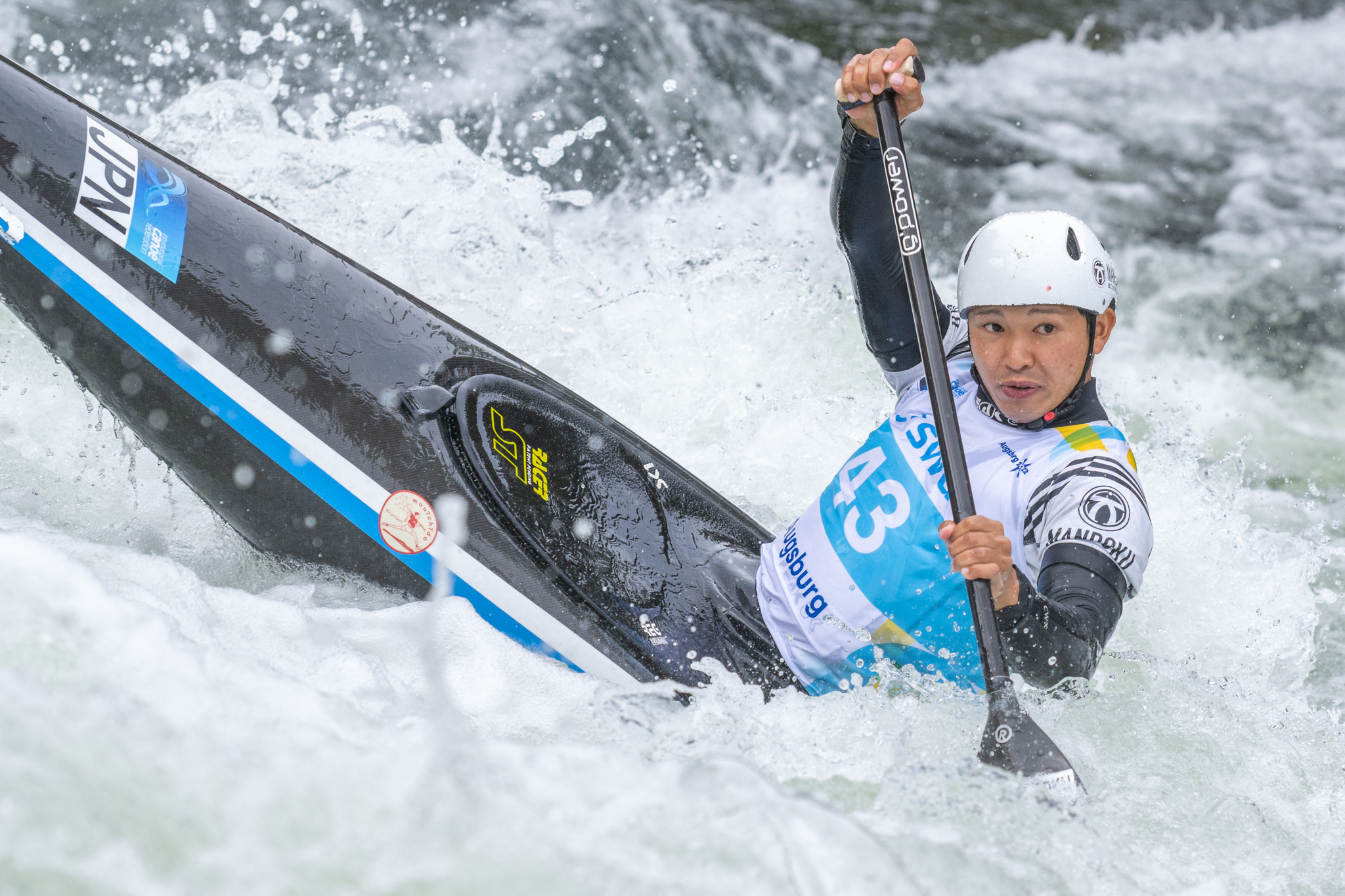
- Shota Sasaki performing at 2022 ICF Canoe Slalom World Championships in Augsburg, Germany

Medal record

Men's canoe slalom

Representing Japan

Asian Championships
Gold medal – first place	2013 Shuili	C1
Gold medal – first place	2016 Toyama	C2
Silver medal – second place	2013 Shuili	C2

Shota Sasaki (佐々木 将汰, Sasaki Shōta; born January 10, 1993) is a Japanese slalom canoeist who has competed since 2008.

He finished 12th in the C2 event at the 2016 Summer Olympics in Rio de Janeiro together with Tsubasa Sasaki.
