= Agnieszka Stanuch =

Polish canoeist

Medal record

Women's canoe slalom

Representing Poland

Junior European Championships
Gold medal – first place	1997 Nowy Sącz	K1 team

Agnieszka Stanuch (born 21 November 1979 in Lubań) is a Polish slalom canoeist who competed at the international level from 1994 to 2008.

She competed in two Summer Olympics and earned her best finish of fifth in the K1 event in Beijing in 2008.

She is daughter of former Polish slalom canoeist Jerzy Stanuch.
