= Kazuya Adachi =

Japanese slalom canoeist (born 1990)

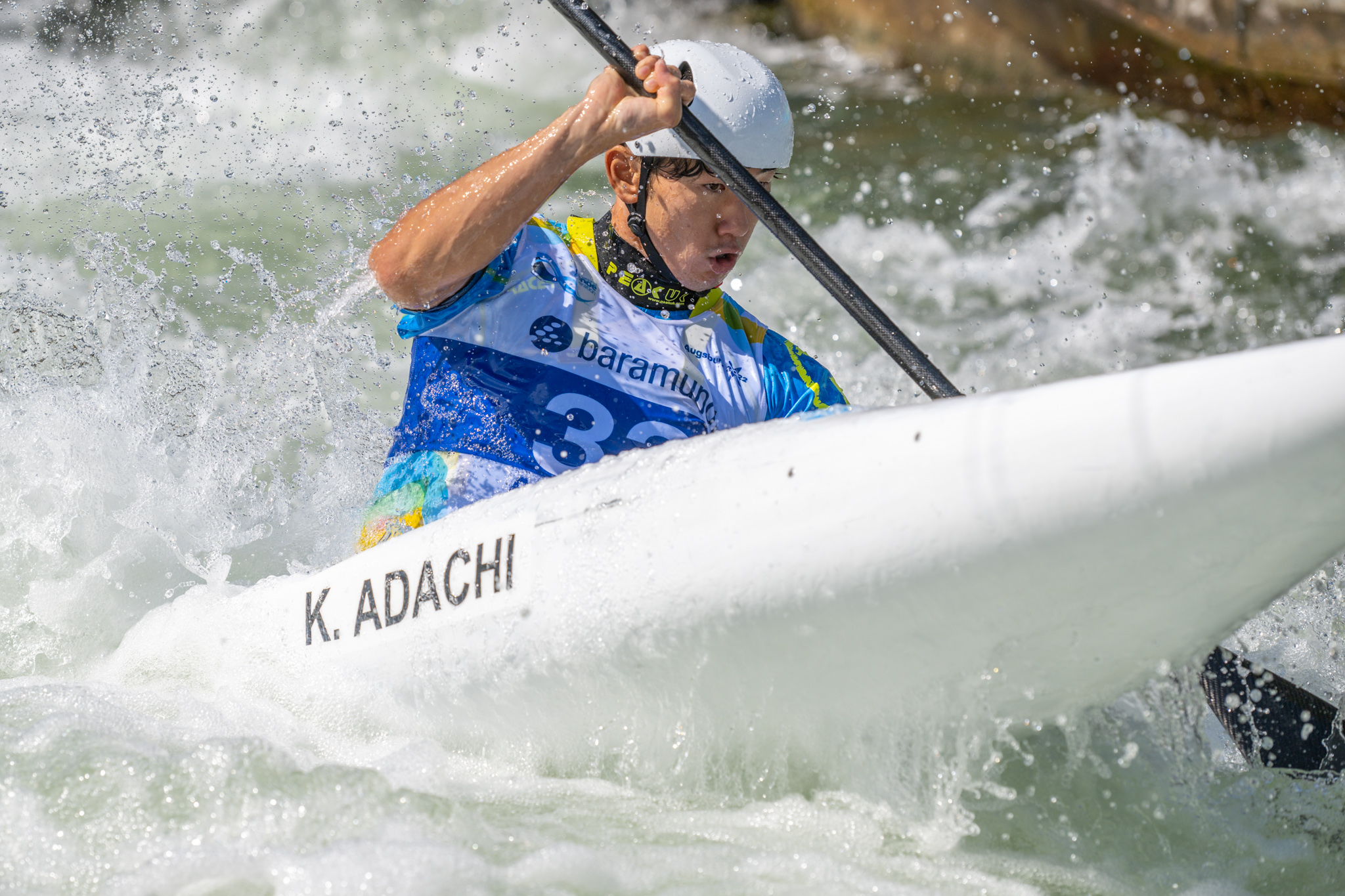
- Adachi performing at 2022 ICF Canoe Slalom World Championships in Augsburg, Germany

Personal information
- Born: 23 October 1990 (age 35) Sagamihara, Kanagawa, Japan
- Height: 175 cm (5 ft 9 in)
- Weight: 70 kg (154 lb)
Medal record
Men's canoe slalom
Representing Japan
World Championships
Silver medal – second place	2025 Penrith	K1 team
Asian Games
Gold medal – first place	2014 Incheon	K1
Asian Championships
Gold medal – first place	2013 Shuili	K1 team
Gold medal – first place	2016 Toyama	K1 team
Bronze medal – third place	2013 Shuili	K1

Kazuya Adachi (足立 和也, Adachi Kazuya; born 23 October 1990) is a Japanese slalom canoeist who has competed at the international level since 2006.

== Career ==
Adachi won a silver medal in the K1 team event at the 2025 World Championships in Penrith. It was the first ever medal for Japan at the ICF Canoe Slalom World Championships.

He also won a gold medal in K1 event at the 2014 Asian Games.

He represented the host country in the K1 event at the delayed 2020 Summer Olympics in Tokyo, where he finished 16th after being eliminated in the semifinal.

== World Cup individual podiums ==
Season	Date	Venue	Position	Event
2016	10 Sep 2016	Tacen	3rd	K1
2017	1 Jul 2017	Markkleeberg	3rd	K1
