= Hermann Husslein =

Thai slalom canoeist (born 1985)

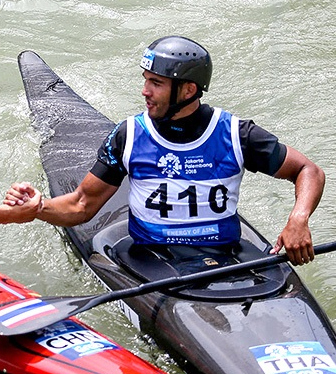
- Husslein at the 2018 Asian Games

Personal information
- Born: 12 September 1985 (age 40) Hanau, Germany
- Height: 171 cm (5 ft 7 in)
- Weight: 69 kg (152 lb)

Sport
- Sport: Canoe slalom
- Club: SKG Hanau
- Coached by: Nicolas Noel
Medal record
Men's canoe slalom
Representing Thailand
Asian Games
Bronze medal – third place	2018 Jakarta	K-1
Asian Championships
Silver medal – second place	2006 Zhangjiagang	K-1
Silver medal – second place	2010 Xiasi	K-1
Bronze medal – third place	2011 Miyi	K-1
Silver medal – second place	2013 Shuili	K-1
Bronze medal – third place	2013 Shuili	K-1 Team
Silver medal – second place	2017 Nakhon Nayok	K-1
Bronze medal – third place	2017 Nakhon Nayok	K-1 Team
Bronze medal – third place	2017 Nakhon Nayok	C-2 Team

Hermann Ludwig Husslein (born 12 September 1985) is a Thai slalom canoeist who competes in the K-1 event. He won a bronze medal at the 2018 Asian Games, placing fourth in 2010 and 2014. At the 2012 Olympics he finished 19th in the heats and failed to qualify for the semifinals.

Husslein he is thai german of mixed ethnicity. He has a degree in mechanical engineering from the Augsburg University of Applied Sciences. In 2012 he became the first Olympic athlete representing Thailand in canoe slalom. He trains in Europe, but also works for the Rowing and Canoeing Association of Thailand. He is involved in a project to build an artificial course in southern Bangkok, in time for the 2020 Olympic qualifiers.

== World Cup individual podiums ==
Season	Date	Venue	Position	Event
2006	27 August 2006	Zhangjiajie	2nd	K1^{1}
2010	2 May 2010	Xiasi	3rd	K1^{1}

^{1} Asia Canoe Slalom Championship counting for World Cup points
