= 2023 ICF Canoe Slalom World Championships – Women's K1 =

Women's kayak at the 2023 ICF Canoe Slalom World Championships
- Venue: Lee Valley White Water Centre
- Location: London, United Kingdom
- Dates: 21–23 September 2023
- Competitors: 75 from 39 nations

Medalists
gold medal	Jessica Fox	Australia
silver medal	Eliška Mintálová	Slovakia
bronze medal	Klaudia Zwolińska	Poland

The women's kayak event at the 2023 ICF Canoe Slalom World Championships took place on 23 September 2023 at the Lee Valley White Water Centre in London, with the qualification heats on 21 September 2023.

== Competition format ==
The event uses a three-round format with qualification heats, semifinal and final. Paddlers complete up to two runs in the heats, with the top ranked athletes starting last. In the first heat, the 20 fastest paddlers qualify automatically for the semifinal, whilst the rest compete in the second heat for additional 10 qualification spots. The final rank of non-qualifying athletes is determined by their second run score. Paddlers start in the reverse order of their heats position in the semifinal and complete a single run, with the top 10 advancing to the final. The start list for the final is once again in reverse order of the semifinal results. The athlete with the best time in the single-run final is awarded gold.

A penalty of 2 seconds is awarded for touching a gate and a 50-second penalty is awarded for missing a gate or negotiating it in the opposite direction.

The heats setup had 23 gates including 6 upstream gates (3-11-12-15-19-23). The semifinal and final gate setup also had 23 gates with 6 upstream gates (3-11-12-15-19-23), but in a more difficult configuration, causing slower times.

== Schedule ==
All times listed are UTC+1.

Date	Time	Round
21 September 2023
21 September 2023	09:00	Heats Run 1
21 September 2023	13:30	Heats Run 2
23 September 2023
23 September 2023	10:03	Semifinal
23 September 2023	13:35	Final

== Results ==
Jessica Fox won her fourth individual world title in the K1 event, tying the all-time record of Ludmila Polesná (Fox surpassed Polesná in the all-time medal table because she also had 2 silvers to 1 of Polesná). Fox was the last paddler to start after winning the semifinal. She touched gate 1, but refocused and still did enough to win gold ahead of Eliška Mintálová from Slovakia, who also had one touch (on gate 3). Klaudia Zwolińska won bronze for Poland with a clean run. Both Mintálová and Zwolińska won their first individual medal at the World Championships.

There were 15 quota spots available for the 2024 Summer Olympics, one per country. The quota spots were secured by:

- Slovakia
- Poland
- Netherlands
- Italy
- Germany
- New Zealand
- Spain
- Switzerland
- Great Britain
- Czech Republic
- Austria
- Brazil
- Slovenia
- Japan
- Australia

Penalties are included in the time shown. The fastest time in each round is shown in bold.

Rank	Bib	Athlete	Country	Heats						Semifinal			Final		
Rank	Bib	Athlete	Country	Run 1			Run 2			Semifinal			Final		
Rank	Bib	Athlete	Country	Time	Pen	Rank	Time	Pen	Rank	Time	Pen	Rank	Time	Pen	Rank
1st place, gold medalist(s)	1	Jessica Fox	Australia	87.32	0	2	-			**102.13**	0	1	**103.60**	2	1
2nd place, silver medalist(s)	8	Eliška Mintálová	Slovakia	88.35	2	7	-			106.74	4	9	104.73	2	2
3rd place, bronze medalist(s)	10	Klaudia Zwolińska	Poland	89.65	0	10	-			104.91	0	5	105.00	0	3
4	22	Martina Wegman	Netherlands	87.75	0	3	-			106.84	4	10	105.03	0	4
5	15	Ana Sátila	Brazil	91.94	0	21	88.78	0	2	104.85	0	4	106.29	0	5
6	4	Stefanie Horn	Italy	89.90	2	11	-			105.84	0	7	106.54	2	6
7	2	Ricarda Funk	Germany	**86.79**	0	1	-			103.50	0	2	106.86	2	7
8	7	Mallory Franklin	Great Britain	94.30	4	31	90.90	0	7	105.00	2	6	108.65	2	8
9	12	Luuka Jones	New Zealand	92.44	0	23	90.09	0	5	104.01	0	3	109.87	2	9
10	29	Soňa Stanovská	Slovakia	91.02	0	17	-			106.63	0	8	157.36	50	10
11	36	Marjorie Delassus	France	89.09	0	9	-			107.02	0	11	did not advance		
12	20	Evy Leibfarth	United States	88.30	0	5	-			107.20	0	12	did not advance		
13	16	Mònica Dòria Vilarrubla	Andorra	88.83	0	8	-			108.25	2	13	did not advance		
14	28	Emma Vuitton	France	89.91	0	12	-			108.58	2	14	did not advance		
15	9	Maialen Chourraut	Spain	90.59	0	16	-			109.23	2	15	did not advance		
16	30	Alena Marx	Switzerland	95.99	4	33	**88.75**	0	1	109.81	2	16	did not advance		
17	24	Lena Teunissen	Netherlands	91.63	0	20	-			110.07	2	17	did not advance		
17	33	Phoebe Spicer	Great Britain	89.97	0	13	-			110.07	2	17	did not advance		
19	13	Kimberley Woods	Great Britain	88.28	2	4	-			110.10	0	19	did not advance		
20	25	Antonie Galušková	Czech Republic	105.17	4	44	91.38	0	10	111.33	0	20	did not advance		
21	17	Corinna Kuhnle	Austria	91.61	2	19	-			111.45	2	21	did not advance		
22	18	Amálie Hilgertová	Czech Republic	93.26	0	29	90.45	0	6	114.17	4	22	did not advance		
23	26	Laia Sorribes	Spain	93.65	2	30	89.69	0	4	116.05	6	23	did not advance		
24	3	Elena Lilik	Germany	88.34	0	6	-			117.21	0	24	did not advance		
25	39	Omira Estácia Neta	Brazil	90.56	0	15	-			121.41	6	25	did not advance		
26	27	Ajda Novak	Slovenia	91.57	0	18	-			160.91	50	26	did not advance		
27	14	Viktoriia Us	Ukraine	92.94	0	26	88.89	0	3	161.30	50	27	did not advance		
28	34	Aki Yazawa	Japan	96.44	2	34	91.05	0	8	162.62	50	28	did not advance		
29	6	Camille Prigent	France	90.26	0	14	-			164.25	50	29	did not advance		
30	53	Kate Eckhardt	Australia	93.09	2	28	91.30	0	9	165.09	52	30	did not advance		
31	5	Eva Terčelj	Slovenia	92.65	2	25	92.19	2	11	did not advance					
32	37	Ria Sribar	United States	105.60	2	45	92.50	0	12	did not advance					
33	35	Chiara Sabattini	Italy	100.76	6	39	92.85	0	13	did not advance					
34	11	Tereza Fišerová	Czech Republic	143.40	50	60	93.73	2	14	did not advance					
35	32	Carole Bouzidi	Algeria	95.83	4	32	93.98	0	15	did not advance					
36	31	Jasmin Schornberg	Germany	143.34	50	59	94.26	0	16	did not advance					
37	21	Eva Alina Hočevar	Slovenia	92.23	2	22	94.63	0	17	did not advance					
38	45	Laura Pellicer Chica	Andorra	109.89	4	47	95.93	2	18	did not advance					
39	67	Wan Shunfang	China	111.09	0	50	96.14	0	19	did not advance					
40	19	Natalia Pacierpnik	Poland	92.60	0	24	96.19	2	20	did not advance					
41	40	Li Tong	China	99.98	4	37	96.80	0	21	did not advance					
42	41	Courtney Williams	New Zealand	101.60	2	41	97.12	2	22	did not advance					
43	47	Katja Bengeri	Croatia	150.55	54	63	98.72	0	23	did not advance					
44	42	Michaela Haššová	Slovakia	106.67	6	46	99.84	6	24	did not advance					
45	50	Léa Baldoni	Canada	97.88	2	36	100.21	2	25	did not advance					
46	46	Florence Maheu	Canada	151.45	50	64	100.40	2	26	did not advance					
46	51	Lois Betteridge	Canada	97.64	2	35	100.40	4	26	did not advance					
48	66	Li Lu	China	93.00	0	27	100.83	4	28	did not advance					
49	38	Hannah Thomas	New Zealand	101.01	2	40	104.15	4	29	did not advance					
50	55	Viktoriia Dobrotvorska	Ukraine	DNS			104.85	0	30	did not advance					
51	44	Dominika Brzeska	Poland	149.60	54	61	106.28	4	31	did not advance					
52	48	Madison Corcoran	Ireland	104.27	6	42	107.36	4	32	did not advance					
53	52	Kurumi Ito	Japan	104.38	8	43	109.25	8	33	did not advance					
53	61	Nerea Castiglione	Argentina	110.20	0	48	109.25	2	33	did not advance					
55	49	Jane Nicholas	Cook Islands	164.58	52	67	110.27	2	35	did not advance					
56	71	Naho Fujii	Japan	120.46	4	54	112.39	4	36	did not advance					
57	56	Sofía Reinoso	Mexico	112.07	4	52	113.44	6	37	did not advance					
58	58	Wu Ting-I	Chinese Taipei	111.65	6	51	114.71	8	38	did not advance					
59	54	Marcella Altman	United States	156.34	56	65	116.30	12	39	did not advance					
60	60	Roxana Razeghian	Iran	125.33	8	55	122.01	8	40	did not advance					
61	63	Florencia Aguirre Gonzalez	Chile	129.62	8	56	127.75	14	41	did not advance					
62	62	Iris Sommernes	Norway	130.90	10	57	128.78	0	42	did not advance					
63	72	Blandine Xhemajlji	Kosovo	199.05	56	68	146.75	4	43	did not advance					
64	43	Olatz Arregui	Spain	100.62	2	38	146.86	52	44	did not advance					
65	73	Emilie Armani	Ecuador	207.42	64	69	155.36	4	45	did not advance					
66	57	Anna Lychko	Ukraine	110.93	4	49	155.81	50	46	did not advance					
67	64	Yekaterina Tarantseva	Kazakhstan	115.71	2	53	157.80	52	47	did not advance					
68	69	Ana Fernandes Castro	Paraguay	269.76	116	70	166.99	16	48	did not advance					
69	68	Anaïs Mouhoub	Algeria	DNF		72	176.52	10	49	did not advance					
70	65	Veronika Šalaševičiūtė-Turbinova	Lithuania	161.30	10	66	202.80	6	50	did not advance					
71	59	Sára Tímea Seprenyi	Hungary	139.93	10	58	231.45	104	51	did not advance					
72	74	Luca Török	Hungary	150.06	8	62	238.68	108	52	did not advance					
73	70	Chantal Bronkhorst	South Africa	611.63	460	71	513.86	270	53	did not advance					
-	23	Viktoria Wolffhardt	Austria	DNS			DNS			did not advance					
-	75	Nidhi .	India	DNS			DNS			did not advance					
