= 2023 ICF Canoe Slalom World Championships – Women's kayak cross =

Women's kayak cross at the 2023 ICF Canoe Slalom World Championships
- Venue: Lee Valley White Water Centre
- Location: London, United Kingdom
- Dates: 24 September 2023
- Competitors: 70 from 33 nations

Medalists
gold medal	Kimberley Woods	Great Britain
silver medal	Camille Prigent	France
bronze medal	Eva Terčelj	Slovenia

The women's kayak cross event at the 2023 ICF Canoe Slalom World Championships took place on 24 September 2023 at the Lee Valley White Water Centre in London.

== Competition format ==
The kayak cross event (formerly known as extreme kayak) is split into two phases - qualification time trials and knockout phase where 4 paddlers race each other head-to-head. Top 20 paddlers from the qualification advance to the knockout phase plus the 12 next fastest paddlers from countries that have not qualified in the top 20. There are 8 heats in the first round of the knockout phase with the top 2 paddlers from each heat advancing to the next round. The same rules apply in quarterfinals and semifinals.

Paddlers start their run by sliding off the starting platform several meters above the water. Then they must navigate the downstream and upstream gates. Unlike in classic slalom, paddlers are allowed to touch the gates and even intentionally move them with their paddle, but not with a free hand. There is also a designated zone where paddlers must perform an Eskimo roll.

Athletes can be penalized in three ways in each round, by receiving a fault (FLT) or by being ranked as lower (RAL). Faults are incurred for false starts, missing gates or failing to correctly perform the Eskimo roll. Athletes are ranked as lower (RAL) if they breach the safety requirements of the competition, such as by holding back another athlete with their hands or paddle, deliberately paddling over another athlete's boat, or by making dangerous contact with another athlete's head or body - all other non-dangerous contact is allowed. In each round athletes are ranked first by the order in which they cross the finish line, with those incurring penalties ranked in the following order: FLT, RAL, DNF, DNS.

The final classification of athletes is determined in the following manner: Athletes eliminated at any phase of the competition will be given their rank based on the comparison of the qualification times of athletes eliminated at the same phase. All 3rd ranked athletes will be ranked above all 4th ranked athletes. The final rank of athletes who did not progress to the heats is determined by their qualification results.

== Schedule ==
All times listed are UTC+1.

Date	Time	Round
24 September 2023
24 September 2023	09:00	Time trials
24 September 2023	11:55	Heats
24 September 2023	13:34	Quarterfinals
24 September 2023	14:11	Semifinals
24 September 2023	14:31	Final

== Results ==
=== Time trials ===
Top 20 qualify automatically. The last 12 spots go to fastest paddlers from countries not yet qualified.

Rank	Bib	Athlete	Country	Time	Notes
1	10	Camille Prigent	France	78.80	Q
2	19	Mallory Franklin	Great Britain	79.83	Q
3	2	Kimberley Woods	Great Britain	79.85	Q
4	34	Angèle Hug	France	80.78	Q
5	13	Tereza Fišerová	Czech Republic	80.93	Q
6	28	Nikita Setchell	Great Britain	81.40	Q
7	20	Marjorie Delassus	France	81.44	Q
8	18	Stefanie Horn	Italy	81.53	Q
9	3	Elena Lilik	Germany	82.13	Q
10	22	Maialen Chourraut	Spain	82.38	Q
11	14	Luuka Jones	New Zealand	82.51	Q
12	49	Phoebe Spicer	Great Britain	82.61	Q
13	6	Eva Terčelj	Slovenia	82.87	Q
14	35	Emma Vuitton	France	83.07	Q
15	5	Ricarda Funk	Germany	83.09	Q
16	21	Eliška Mintálová	Slovakia	83.50	Q
17	24	Zuzana Paňková	Slovakia	83.71	Q
18	11	Noemie Fox	Australia	83.79	Q
19	15	Martina Wegman	Netherlands	83.82	Q
20	8	Mònica Dòria Vilarrubla	Andorra	84.05	Q
21	23	Alena Marx	Switzerland	84.15	Q
22	66	Jasmin Schornberg	Germany	84.28	FR: 33
23	7	Evy Leibfarth	United States	84.54	Q
24	39	Amálie Hilgertová	Czech Republic	84.58	FR: 34
25	17	Miren Lazkano	Spain	84.59	FR: 35
26	9	Viktoriia Us	Ukraine	85.13	Q
27	16	Klaudia Zwolińska	Poland	85.18	Q
28	4	Ana Sátila	Brazil	86.14	Q
29	29	Soňa Stanovská	Slovakia	86.35	FR: 36
30	41	Carole Bouzidi	Algeria	86.75	Q
31	1	Jessica Fox	Australia	86.84	FR: 37
32	25	Ajda Novak	Slovenia	86.92	FR: 38
33	50	Florence Maheu	Canada	87.37	Q
34	31	Omira Estácia Neta	Brazil	87.83	FR: 39
35	32	Lois Betteridge	Canada	87.90	FR: 40
36	48	Eva Alina Hočevar	Slovenia	88.22	FR: 41
37	37	Tereza Kneblová	Czech Republic	89.55	FR: 42
38	55	Kate Eckhardt	Australia	89.68	FR: 43
39	46	Aleksandra Stach	Poland	90.29	FR: 44
40	42	Viktoria Wolffhardt	Austria	90.76	Q
41	33	Hannah Thomas	New Zealand	90.87	FR: 45
42	26	Léa Baldoni	Canada	91.53	FR: 46
43	44	Lena Teunissen	Netherlands	91.53	FR: 47
44	56	Li Lu	China	97.12	Q
45	40	Florencia Aguirre González	Chile	97.32	Q
46	63	Dominika Brzeska	Poland	97.63	FR: 48
47	52	Chiara Sabattini	Italy	97.88	FR: 49
48	59	Wan Shunfang	China	98.24	FR: 50
49	38	Courtney Williams	New Zealand	99.15	FR: 51
50	47	Sofía Reinoso	Mexico	99.79	Q
51	36	Klara Olazabal	Spain	100.65	FR: 52
52	51	Iris Sommernes	Norway	102.99	Q
53	57	Yekaterina Tarantseva	Kazakhstan	104.03	
54	54	Nerea Castiglione	Argentina	105.96	
55	67	Sára Tímea Seprenyi	Hungary	106.01	
56	53	Marcella Altman	United States	107.35	
57	68	Wu Ting-I	Chinese Taipei	108.72	
58	62	Blandine Xhemajlji	Kosovo	115.99	
59	64	Veronika Šalaševičiūtė-Turbinova	Lithuania	116.69	
60	58	Anastassiya Ananyeva	Kazakhstan	118.76	
61	45	Laura Pellicer Chica	Andorra	88.02	FLT (6)
62	27	Olatz Arregui	Spain	99.13	FLT (5)
63	61	Chantal Bronkhorst	South Africa	137.10	FLT (4)
64	65	Emilie Armani	Ecuador	129.92	FLT (3)
65	70	Anaïs Mouhoub	Algeria	126.39	FLT (1)
66	30	Veronika Vojtová	Czech Republic	83.83	FLT (S)
67	69	Nidhi .	India	118.82	FLT (1, 3, 6)
-	60	Beatriz Da Motta	Brazil	-	DNS
-	12	Corinna Kuhnle	Austria	-	DNS
-	43	Li Tong	China	-	DNS

=== Knockout rounds ===
Top 2 from each heat, quarterfinal and semifinal advance to the next round.

==== Heats ====
Heat 1

Rank	Bib	Athlete	Country	Notes
1	1	Camille Prigent	France	Q
2	16	Eliška Mintálová	Slovakia	Q
3	17	Zuzana Paňková	Slovakia	
4	32	Iris Sommernes	Norway	

Heat 2

Rank	Bib	Athlete	Country	Notes
1	8	Stefanie Horn	Italy	Q
2	24	Klaudia Zwolińska	Poland	Q
3	9	Elena Lilik	Germany	
4	25	Ana Sátila	Brazil	

Heat 3

Rank	Bib	Athlete	Country	Notes
1	21	Alena Marx	Switzerland	Q
2	28	Viktoria Wolffhardt	Austria	Q
3	5	Tereza Fišerová	Czech Republic	
4	12	Phoebe Spicer	Great Britain	

Heat 4

Rank	Bib	Athlete	Country	Notes
1	13	Eva Terčelj	Slovenia	Q
2	4	Angèle Hug	France	Q
3	20	Mònica Dòria Vilarrubla	Andorra	
4	29	Li Lu	China	FLT (3)

Heat 5

Rank	Bib	Athlete	Country	Notes
1	3	Kimberley Woods	Great Britain	Q
2	14	Emma Vuitton	France	Q
3	19	Martina Wegman	Netherlands	
4	30	Florencia Aguirre Gonzalez	Chile	

Heat 6

Rank	Bib	Athlete	Country	Notes
1	6	Nikita Setchell	Great Britain	Q
2	27	Florence Maheu	Canada	Q
3	22	Evy Leibfarth	United States	
4	11	Luuka Jones	New Zealand	FLT (S)

Heat 7

Rank	Bib	Athlete	Country	Notes
1	7	Marjorie Delassus	France	Q
2	10	Maialen Chourraut	Spain	Q
3	26	Carole Bouzidi	Algeria	
4	23	Viktoriia Us	Ukraine	FLT (6)

Heat 8

Rank	Bib	Athlete	Country	Notes
1	18	Noemie Fox	Australia	Q
2	15	Ricarda Funk	Germany	Q
3	31	Sofía Reinoso	Mexico	
4	2	Mallory Franklin	Great Britain	FLT (5)

==== Quarterfinals ====
Quarterfinal 1

Rank	Bib	Athlete	Country	Notes
1	8	Stefanie Horn	Italy	Q
2	1	Camille Prigent	France	Q
3	16	Eliška Mintálová	Slovakia	
4	24	Klaudia Zwolińska	Poland	FLT (6)

Quarterfinal 2

Rank	Bib	Athlete	Country	Notes
1	13	Eva Terčelj	Slovenia	Q
2	4	Angèle Hug	France	Q
3	28	Viktoria Wolffhardt	Austria	
4	21	Alena Marx	Switzerland	FLT (6)

Quarterfinal 3

Rank	Bib	Athlete	Country	Notes
1	14	Emma Vuitton	France	Q
2	3	Kimberley Woods	Great Britain	Q
3	6	Nikita Setchell	Great Britain	
4	27	Florence Maheu	Canada	

Quarterfinal 4

Rank	Bib	Athlete	Country	Notes
1	18	Noemie Fox	Australia	Q
2	10	Maialen Chourraut	Spain	Q
3	15	Ricarda Funk	Germany	
4	7	Marjorie Delassus	France	

==== Semifinals ====
Semifinal 1

Rank	Bib	Athlete	Country	Notes
1	1	Camille Prigent	France	Q
2	13	Eva Terčelj	Slovenia	Q
3	4	Angèle Hug	France	
4	8	Stefanie Horn	Italy	DNF

Semifinal 2

Rank	Bib	Athlete	Country	Notes
1	3	Kimberley Woods	Great Britain	Q
2	14	Emma Vuitton	France	Q
3	10	Maialen Chourraut	Spain	
4	18	Noemie Fox	Australia	

==== Final ====
Rank	Bib	Athlete	Country	Notes
1st place, gold medalist(s)	3	Kimberley Woods	Great Britain	
2nd place, silver medalist(s)	1	Camille Prigent	France	
3rd place, bronze medalist(s)	13	Eva Terčelj	Slovenia	
4	14	Emma Vuitton	France	

=== Final ranking (Top 32) ===
The top 32 ranking determined by the knockout rounds. Bib numbers correspond to seeding after time trials.

Rank	Bib	Athlete	Country	Heat rank
1st place, gold medalist(s)	3	Kimberley Woods	Great Britain	1
2nd place, silver medalist(s)	1	Camille Prigent	France	2
3rd place, bronze medalist(s)	13	Eva Terčelj	Slovenia	3
4	14	Emma Vuitton	France	4
5	4	Angèle Hug	France	SF1 (3)
6	10	Maialen Chourraut	Spain	SF2 (3)
7	8	Stefanie Horn	Italy	SF1 (4)
8	18	Noemie Fox	Australia	SF2 (4)
9	6	Nikita Setchell	Great Britain	QF3 (3)
10	15	Ricarda Funk	Germany	QF4 (3)
11	16	Eliška Mintálová	Slovakia	QF1 (3)
12	28	Viktoria Wolffhardt	Austria	QF2 (3)
13	7	Marjorie Delassus	France	QF4 (4)
14	21	Alena Marx	Switzerland	QF2 (4)
15	24	Klaudia Zwolińska	Poland	QF1 (4)
16	27	Florence Maheu	Canada	QF3 (4)
17	5	Tereza Fišerová	Czech Republic	H3 (3)
18	9	Elena Lilik	Germany	H2 (3)
19	17	Zuzana Paňková	Slovakia	H1 (3)
20	19	Martina Wegman	Netherlands	H5 (3)
21	20	Mònica Dòria Vilarrubla	Andorra	H4 (3)
22	22	Evy Leibfarth	United States	H6 (3)
23	26	Carole Bouzidi	Algeria	H7 (3)
24	31	Sofía Reinoso	Mexico	H8 (3)
25	2	Mallory Franklin	Great Britain	H8 (4)
26	11	Luuka Jones	New Zealand	H6 (4)
27	12	Phoebe Spicer	Great Britain	H3 (4)
28	23	Viktoriia Us	Ukraine	H7 (4)
29	25	Ana Sátila	Brazil	H2 (4)
30	29	Li Lu	China	H4 (4)
31	30	Florencia Aguirre Gonzalez	Chile	H5 (4)
32	32	Iris Sommernes	Norway	H1 (4)
