= 2025 ICF Canoe Slalom World Championships – Women's kayak cross =

Women's kayak cross at the 2025 ICF Canoe Slalom World Championships
- Venue: Penrith Whitewater Stadium
- Location: Penrith, Australia
- Dates: 29 September – 4 October 2025
- Competitors: 51 from 27 nations

Medalists
gold medal	Angèle Hug	France
silver medal	Camille Prigent	France
bronze medal	Klaudia Zwolińska	Poland

The women's kayak cross event at the 2025 ICF Canoe Slalom World Championships took place on 4 October 2025 at the Penrith Whitewater Stadium in Penrith, with the qualification time trial on 29 September 2025.

== Competition format ==
The kayak cross event is split into two phases – qualification time trials and knockout phase where 3 or 4 paddlers race each other head-to-head. Top 42 paddlers from the individual time trial (which is a medal event in itself) advance to the knockout phase.

Paddlers start their run by sliding off the starting platform several meters above the water. Then they must navigate the downstream and upstream gates. Unlike in classic slalom, paddlers are allowed to touch the gates and even intentionally move them with their paddle, but not with a free hand. There is also a designated zone where paddlers must perform an Eskimo roll.

Athletes can be penalized in three ways in each round, by receiving a fault (FLT) or by being ranked as lower (RAL). Faults are incurred for false starts, missing gates or failing to correctly perform the Eskimo roll. Athletes are ranked as lower (RAL) if they breach the safety requirements of the competition, such as by holding back another athlete with their hands or paddle, deliberately paddling over another athlete's boat, or by making dangerous contact with another athlete's head or body - all other non-dangerous contact is allowed. In each round athletes are ranked first by the order in which they cross the finish line, with those incurring penalties ranked in the following order: FLT, RAL, DNF, DNS.

The final classification of athletes is determined in the following manner: Athletes eliminated at any phase of the competition will be given their rank based on the comparison of the qualification times of athletes eliminated at the same phase. All 3rd ranked athletes will be ranked above all 4th ranked athletes.

== Schedule ==
All times listed are UTC+10.

Date	Time	Round
29 September 2025	14:58	Time trial
4 October 2025
4 October 2025	10:03	Round 1
4 October 2025	11:22	Repechage round
4 October 2025	12:33	Heats
4 October 2025	14:05	Quarterfinals
4 October 2025	14:49	Semifinals
4 October 2025	15:11	Small final
4 October 2025	15:24	Final

== Results ==
=== Time trial ===
- 2025 ICF Canoe Slalom World Championships – Women's kayak cross individual

=== Round 1 ===
Top 2 from each race advance to the heats. The rest go to repechage.

Proceed to heats
Proceed to repechage

Race 1
Rank	Bib	Athlete	Country	Notes
1	12	Chiara Sabattini	Italy	
2	1	Alena Marx	Switzerland	
3	33	Marcella Altman	United States	

Race 2
Rank	Bib	Athlete	Country	Notes
1	2	Ajda Novak	Slovenia	
2	13	Miren Lazkano	Spain	
3	32	Mariia Sokolova	Individual Neutral Athletes	

Race 3
Rank	Bib	Athlete	Country	Notes
1	3	Ana Sátila	Brazil	
2	14	Tereza Kneblová	Czech Republic	
3	42	Laura Plata	Colombia	
4	31	Rosie Rex	New Zealand	

Race 4
Rank	Bib	Athlete	Country	Notes
1	15	Kimberley Woods	Great Britain	
2	41	Li Shiting	China	
3	4	Andrea Herzog	Germany	
4	30	Chang Chu-han	Chinese Taipei	FLT (6)

Race 5
Rank	Bib	Athlete	Country	Notes
1	16	Soňa Stanovská	Slovakia	
2	29	Viktoriia Us	Ukraine	
3	5	Noemie Fox	Australia	
4	40	Waris Mills	South Africa	

Race 6
Rank	Bib	Athlete	Country	Notes
1	6	Angèle Hug	France	
2	17	Maialen Chourraut	Spain	
3	28	Dominika Brzeska	Poland	
4	39	Cleo Pitcher Farrell	Ireland	

Race 7
Rank	Bib	Athlete	Country	Notes
1	7	Emma Vuitton	France	
2	18	Zuzana Paňková	Slovakia	
3	27	Lois Leaver	Great Britain	FLT (5)
4	38	Xie Xueting	China	FLT (R, 8)

Race 8
Rank	Bib	Athlete	Country	Notes
1	19	Camille Prigent	France	
2	8	Nikita Setchell	Great Britain	
3	26	Lena Teunissen	Netherlands	
4	37	Codie Davidson	Australia	

Race 9
Rank	Bib	Athlete	Country	Notes
1	25	Omira Estácia Neta	Brazil	
2	20	Amálie Hilgertová	Czech Republic	
3	36	Courtney Williams	New Zealand	
4	9	Mònica Dòria	Andorra	

Race 10
Rank	Bib	Athlete	Country	Notes
1	10	Klaudia Zwolińska	Poland	
2	21	Aleksandra Góra	Poland	
3	24	Kseniia Krylova	Individual Neutral Athletes	
4	35	Sofía Reinoso	Mexico	

Race 11
Rank	Bib	Athlete	Country	Notes
1	11	Evy Leibfarth	United States	
2	22	Nele Bayn	Germany	
3	23	Laia Sorribes	Spain	
4	34	Ricarda Funk	Germany	FLT (5)

=== Repechage ===
Top 2 from each race advance to the heats. The rest are eliminated.

Proceed to heats
Eliminated

Race 1
Rank	Bib	Athlete	Country	Notes
1	4	Andrea Herzog	Germany	
2	26	Lena Teunissen	Netherlands	
3	42	Laura Plata	Colombia	
4	36	Courtney Williams	New Zealand	

Race 2
Rank	Bib	Athlete	Country	Notes
1	27	Lois Leaver	Great Britain	
2	5	Noemie Fox	Australia	
3	40	Waris Mills	South Africa	
4	35	Sofía Reinoso	Mexico	

Race 3
Rank	Bib	Athlete	Country	Notes
1	9	Mònica Dòria	Andorra	
2	34	Ricarda Funk	Germany	
3	28	Dominika Brzeska	Poland	
4	39	Cleo Pitcher Farrell	Ireland	

Race 4
Rank	Bib	Athlete	Country	Notes
1	23	Laia Sorribes	Spain	
2	30	Chang Chu-han	Chinese Taipei	
3	33	Marcella Altman	United States	
	38	Xie Xueting	China	DNS

Race 5
Rank	Bib	Athlete	Country	Notes
1	31	Rosie Rex	New Zealand	
2	24	Kseniia Krylova	Individual Neutral Athletes	
3	32	Mariia Sokolova	Individual Neutral Athletes	
4	37	Codie Davidson	Australia	

=== Heats ===
Top 2 from each race advance to the quarterfinals. The rest are eliminated.

Proceed to quarterfinals
Eliminated

Race 1
Rank	Bib	Athlete	Country	Notes
1	16	Maialen Chourraut	Spain	
2	32	Ricarda Funk	Germany	
3	17	Zuzana Paňková	Slovakia	
4	1	Ajda Novak	Slovenia	FLT (2)

Race 2
Rank	Bib	Athlete	Country	Notes
1	24	Mònica Dòria	Andorra	
2	8	Kimberley Woods	Great Britain	
3	9	Soňa Stanovská	Slovakia	
4	25	Laia Sorribes	Spain	

Race 3
Rank	Bib	Athlete	Country	Notes
1	21	Viktoriia Us	Ukraine	
2	5	Klaudia Zwolińska	Poland	
3	12	Alena Marx	Switzerland	
4	28	Noemie Fox	Australia	

Race 4
Rank	Bib	Athlete	Country	Notes
1	29	Kseniia Krylova	Individual Neutral Athletes	
2	13	Nikita Setchell	Great Britain	
3	4	Emma Vuitton	France	
4	20	Nele Bayn	Germany	

Race 5
Rank	Bib	Athlete	Country	Notes
1	3	Angèle Hug	France	
2	30	Lena Teunissen	Netherlands	
3	14	Miren Lazkano	Spain	
4	19	Aleksandra Góra	Poland	

Race 6
Rank	Bib	Athlete	Country	Notes
1	6	Evy Leibfarth	United States	
2	22	Li Shiting	China	
3	27	Rosie Rex	New Zealand	
4	11	Omira Estácia Neta	Brazil	

Race 7
Rank	Bib	Athlete	Country	Notes
1	10	Camille Prigent	France	
2	23	Andrea Herzog	Germany	
3	7	Chiara Sabattini	Italy	
4	26	Lois Leaver	Great Britain	

Race 8
Rank	Bib	Athlete	Country	Notes
1	15	Tereza Kneblová	Czech Republic	
2	2	Ana Sátila	Brazil	
3	31	Chang Chu-han	Chinese Taipei	
4	18	Amálie Hilgertová	Czech Republic	

=== Quarterfinals ===
Top 2 from each race advance to the semifinals. The rest are eliminated.

Proceed to semifinals
Eliminated

Race 1
Rank	Bib	Athlete	Country	Notes
1	16	Maialen Chourraut	Spain	
2	32	Ricarda Funk	Germany	
3	8	Kimberley Woods	Great Britain	
4	24	Mònica Dòria	Andorra	

Race 2
Rank	Bib	Athlete	Country	Notes
1	5	Klaudia Zwolińska	Poland	
2	13	Nikita Setchell	Great Britain	
3	21	Viktoriia Us	Ukraine	
4	29	Kseniia Krylova	Individual Neutral Athletes	FLT (2)

Race 3
Rank	Bib	Athlete	Country	Notes
1	3	Angèle Hug	France	
2	6	Evy Leibfarth	United States	
3	30	Lena Teunissen	Netherlands	
4	22	Li Shiting	China	

Race 4
Rank	Bib	Athlete	Country	Notes
1	23	Andrea Herzog	Germany	
2	10	Camille Prigent	France	
3	15	Tereza Kneblová	Czech Republic	
4	2	Ana Sátila	Brazil	

=== Semifinals ===
Top 2 from each race advance to the final. The rest go to the small final.

Proceed to final
Proceed to small final

Race 1
Rank	Bib	Athlete	Country	Notes
1	16	Maialen Chourraut	Spain	
2	5	Klaudia Zwolińska	Poland	
3	13	Nikita Setchell	Great Britain	
4	32	Ricarda Funk	Germany	

Race 2
Rank	Bib	Athlete	Country	Notes
1	3	Angèle Hug	France	
2	10	Camille Prigent	France	
3	23	Andrea Herzog	Germany	
4	6	Evy Leibfarth	United States	

=== Small final ===
Rank	Bib	Athlete	Country	Notes
1	13	Nikita Setchell	Great Britain	
2	32	Ricarda Funk	Germany	
3	23	Andrea Herzog	Germany	
4	6	Evy Leibfarth	United States	

=== Final ===
Rank	Bib	Athlete	Country	Notes
1st place, gold medalist(s)	3	Angèle Hug	France	
2nd place, silver medalist(s)	10	Camille Prigent	France	
3rd place, bronze medalist(s)	5	Klaudia Zwolińska	Poland	
4	16	Maialen Chourraut	Spain	

=== Final ranking (Top 42) ===
The top 42 ranking determined by the knockout rounds.

Rank	Athlete	Country	Heat rank
1st place, gold medalist(s)	Angèle Hug	France	1
2nd place, silver medalist(s)	Camille Prigent	France	2
3rd place, bronze medalist(s)	Klaudia Zwolińska	Poland	3
4	Maialen Chourraut	Spain	4
5	Nikita Setchell	Great Britain	1
6	Ricarda Funk	Germany	2
7	Andrea Herzog	Germany	3
8	Evy Leibfarth	United States	4
9	Kimberley Woods	Great Britain	QF1 (3)
10	Tereza Kneblová	Czech Republic	QF4 (3)
11	Viktoriia Us	Ukraine	QF2 (3)
12	Lena Teunissen	Netherlands	QF3 (3)
13	Ana Sátila	Brazil	QF4 (4)
14	Li Shiting	China	QF3 (4)
15	Mònica Dòria	Andorra	QF1 (4)
16	Kseniia Krylova	Individual Neutral Athletes	QF2 (4)
17	Emma Vuitton	France	H4 (3)
18	Chiara Sabattini	Italy	H7 (3)
19	Soňa Stanovská	Slovakia	H2 (3)
20	Alena Marx	Switzerland	H3 (3)
21	Miren Lazkano	Spain	H5 (3)
22	Zuzana Paňková	Slovakia	H1 (3)
23	Rosie Rex	New Zealand	H6 (3)
24	Chang Chu-han	Chinese Taipei	H8 (3)
25	Ajda Novak	Slovenia	H1 (4)
26	Omira Estácia Neta	Brazil	H6 (4)
27	Amálie Hilgertová	Czech Republic	H8 (4)
28	Aleksandra Góra	Poland	H5 (4)
29	Nele Bayn	Germany	H4 (4)
30	Laia Sorribes	Spain	H2 (4)
31	Lois Leaver	Great Britain	H7 (4)
32	Noemie Fox	Australia	H3 (4)
33	Dominika Brzeska	Poland	RE (3)
34	Mariia Sokolova	Individual Neutral Athletes	RE (3)
35	Marcella Altman	United States	RE (3)
36	Waris Mills	South Africa	RE (3)
37	Laura Plata	Colombia	RE (3)
38	Sofía Reinoso	Mexico	RE (4)
39	Courtney Williams	New Zealand	RE (4)
40	Codie Davidson	Australia	RE (4)
41	Cleo Pitcher Farrell	Ireland	RE (4)
42	Xie Xueting	China	RE (DNS)
