= 2026 ICF Canoe Slalom World Championships – Women's kayak cross =

Women's kayak cross at the 2026 ICF Canoe Slalom World Championships
- Venue: RIVERSPORT OKC
- Location: Oklahoma City, United States
- Dates: 20–25 July 2026
- Competitors: 61 from 29 nations

Medalists
gold medal	Alena Marx	Switzerland
silver medal	Noemie Fox	Australia
bronze medal	Miren Lazkano	Spain

The women's kayak cross event at the 2026 ICF Canoe Slalom World Championships took place on 25 July 2026 at the RIVERSPORT OKC in Oklahoma City, with the qualification time trial on 20 July 2026.

== Competition format ==
The kayak cross event is split into two phases – qualification time trials and knockout phase where 3 or 4 paddlers race each other head-to-head. Top 42 paddlers from the individual time trial (which is a medal event in itself) advance to the knockout phase.

Paddlers start their run by sliding off the starting platform several meters above the water. Then they must navigate the downstream and upstream gates. Unlike in classic slalom, paddlers are allowed to touch the gates and even intentionally move them with their paddle, but not with a free hand. There is also a designated zone where paddlers must perform an Eskimo roll.

Athletes can be penalized in three ways in each round, by receiving a fault (FLT) or by being ranked as lower (RAL). Faults are incurred for false starts, missing gates or failing to correctly perform the Eskimo roll. Athletes are ranked as lower (RAL) if they breach the safety requirements of the competition, such as by holding back another athlete with their hands or paddle, deliberately paddling over another athlete's boat, or by making dangerous contact with another athlete's head or body - all other non-dangerous contact is allowed. In each round athletes are ranked first by the order in which they cross the finish line, with those incurring penalties ranked in the following order: FLT, RAL, DNF, DNS.

The final classification of athletes is determined in the following manner: Athletes eliminated at any phase of the competition will be given their rank based on the comparison of the qualification times of athletes eliminated at the same phase. All 3rd ranked athletes will be ranked above all 4th ranked athletes.

== Schedule ==
All times listed are UTC–5.

Date	Time	Round
20 July 2026	11:06	Time trial
25 July 2026
25 July 2026	10:04	Round 1
25 July 2026	11:21	Repechage round
25 July 2026	13:34	Heats
25 July 2026	15:05	Quarterfinals
25 July 2026	15:44	Semifinals
25 July 2026	16:08	Small final
25 July 2026	16:20	Final

== Results ==
=== Time trial ===
- 2026 ICF Canoe Slalom World Championships – Women's kayak cross individual

=== Round 1 ===
Top 2 from each race advance to the heats. The rest go to repechage.

Proceed to heats
Proceed to repechage

Race 1
Rank	Bib	Athlete	Country	Notes
1	1	Jessica Fox	Australia	
2	33	Aki Yazawa	Japan	
3	12	Alena Marx	Switzerland	

Race 2
Rank	Bib	Athlete	Country	Notes
1	13	Andrea Herzog	Germany	
2	2	Kateřina Beková	Czech Republic	
3	32	Kseniia Krylova	Individual Neutral Athletes	

Race 3
Rank	Bib	Athlete	Country	Notes
1	3	Lois Leaver	Great Britain	
2	14	Omira Estácia Neta	Brazil	
3	42	Anastassiya Ananyeva	Kazakhstan	
4	31	Chen Lin	China	FLT (S)

Race 4
Rank	Bib	Athlete	Country	Notes
1	4	Miren Lazkano	Spain	
2	15	Dominika Brzeska	Poland	
3	41	Florencia Aguirre González	Chile	
4	30	Ada Mackie	Australia	

Race 5
Rank	Bib	Athlete	Country	Notes
1	5	Camille Prigent	France	
2	16	Klaudia Zwolińska	Poland	
3	40	Lena Teunissen	Netherlands	
4	29	Cleo Pitcher Farrell	Ireland	

Race 6
Rank	Bib	Athlete	Country	Notes
1	6	Ricarda Funk	Germany	
2	28	Svenja Matti	Switzerland	
3	17	Evy Leibfarth	United States	
4	39	Kahlia Cullwick	New Zealand	RAL

Race 7
Rank	Bib	Athlete	Country	Notes
1	27	Viktoriia Us	Ukraine	
2	7	Laia Sorribes	Spain	
3	38	Mine Onozawa	Japan	
4	18	Eliška Mintálová	Slovakia	FLT (3)

Race 8
Rank	Bib	Athlete	Country	Notes
1	8	Kimberley Woods	Great Britain	
2	26	Nikita Setchell	Great Britain	
3	19	Ana Sátila	Brazil	
4	37	Isabella Altman	United States	

Race 9
Rank	Bib	Athlete	Country	Notes
1	25	Lois Betteridge	Canada	
2	9	Soňa Stanovská	Slovakia	
3	36	Marcella Altman	United States	
4	20	Li Shiting	China	

Race 10
Rank	Bib	Athlete	Country	Notes
1	21	Zuzana Paňková	Slovakia	
2	10	Maialen Chourraut	Spain	
3	24	Xu Linxi	China	
4	35	Wu Ting-i	Chinese Taipei	

Race 11
Rank	Bib	Athlete	Country	Notes
1	23	Marjorie Delassus	France	
2	34	Annkatrin Plochmann	Germany	
3	11	Noemie Fox	Australia	FLT (3)
4	22	Olga Samková	Czech Republic	FLT (3)

=== Repechage ===
Top 2 from each race advance to the heats. The rest are eliminated.

Proceed to heats
Eliminated

Race 1
Rank	Bib	Athlete	Country	Notes
1	11	Noemie Fox	Australia	
2	20	Li Shiting	China	
3	42	Anastassiya Ananyeva	Kazakhstan	
4	37	Isabella Altman	United States	

Race 2
Rank	Bib	Athlete	Country	Notes
1	12	Alena Marx	Switzerland	
2	22	Olga Samková	Czech Republic	
3	36	Marcella Altman	United States	
4	41	Florencia Aguirre González	Chile	FLT (3, 4)

Race 3
Rank	Bib	Athlete	Country	Notes
1	17	Evy Leibfarth	United States	
2	24	Xu Linxi	China	
3	35	Wu Ting-i	Chinese Taipei	
4	40	Lena Teunissen	Netherlands	FLT (1)

Race 4
Rank	Bib	Athlete	Country	Notes
1	32	Kseniia Krylova	Individual Neutral Athletes	
2	39	Kahlia Cullwick	New Zealand	
3	29	Cleo Pitcher Farrell	Ireland	
4	18	Eliška Mintálová	Slovakia	

Race 5
Rank	Bib	Athlete	Country	Notes
1	19	Ana Sátila	Brazil	
2	31	Chen Lin	China	
3	30	Ada Mackie	Australia	
4	38	Mine Onozawa	Japan	

=== Heats ===
Top 2 from each race advance to the quarterfinals. The rest are eliminated.

Proceed to quarterfinals
Eliminated

Race 1
Rank	Bib	Athlete	Country	Notes
1	1	Jessica Fox	Australia	
2	32	Kahlia Cullwick	New Zealand	FLT (6)
3	16	Omira Estácia Neta	Brazil	FLT (2)
4	17	Dominika Brzeska	Poland	FLT (1)

Race 2
Rank	Bib	Athlete	Country	Notes
1	24	Alena Marx	Switzerland	
2	8	Zuzana Paňková	Slovakia	
3	9	Marjorie Delassus	France	
4	25	Evy Leibfarth	United States	RAL

Race 3
Rank	Bib	Athlete	Country	Notes
1	5	Ricarda Funk	Germany	
2	12	Kateřina Beková	Czech Republic	
3	21	Aki Yazawa	Japan	FLT (6)
4	28	Li Shiting	China	FLT (3)

Race 4
Rank	Bib	Athlete	Country	Notes
1	13	Laia Sorribes	Spain	
2	29	Olga Samková	Czech Republic	
3	20	Svenja Matti	Switzerland	
4	4	Camille Prigent	France	FLT (3)

Race 5
Rank	Bib	Athlete	Country	Notes
1	14	Soňa Stanovská	Slovakia	
2	3	Miren Lazkano	Spain	
3	30	Xu Linxi	China	
4	19	Nikita Setchell	Great Britain	

Race 6
Rank	Bib	Athlete	Country	Notes
1	11	Viktoriia Us	Ukraine	
2	6	Kimberley Woods	Great Britain	
3	27	Kseniia Krylova	Individual Neutral Athletes	
4	22	Annkatrin Plochmann	Germany	

Race 7
Rank	Bib	Athlete	Country	Notes
1	7	Andrea Herzog	Germany	
2	23	Noemie Fox	Australia	
3	10	Lois Betteridge	Canada	
4	26	Ana Sátila	Brazil	

Race 8
Rank	Bib	Athlete	Country	Notes
1	2	Lois Leaver	Great Britain	
2	18	Klaudia Zwolińska	Poland	
3	31	Chen Lin	China	
4	15	Maialen Chourraut	Spain	

=== Quarterfinals ===
Top 2 from each race advance to the semifinals. The rest are eliminated.

Proceed to semifinals
Eliminated

Race 1
Rank	Bib	Athlete	Country	Notes
1	24	Alena Marx	Switzerland	
2	8	Zuzana Paňková	Slovakia	
3	32	Kahlia Cullwick	New Zealand	
4	1	Jessica Fox	Australia	FLT (2)

Race 2
Rank	Bib	Athlete	Country	Notes
1	29	Olga Samková	Czech Republic	
2	5	Ricarda Funk	Germany	
3	12	Kateřina Beková	Czech Republic	
4	13	Laia Sorribes	Spain	

Race 3
Rank	Bib	Athlete	Country	Notes
1	3	Miren Lazkano	Spain	
2	14	Soňa Stanovská	Slovakia	
3	11	Viktoriia Us	Ukraine	
4	6	Kimberley Woods	Great Britain	

Race 4
Rank	Bib	Athlete	Country	Notes
1	2	Lois Leaver	Great Britain	
2	23	Noemie Fox	Australia	
3	7	Andrea Herzog	Germany	
4	18	Klaudia Zwolińska	Poland	FLT (2)

=== Semifinals ===
Top 2 from each race advance to the final. The rest go to the small final.

Proceed to final
Proceed to small final

Race 1
Rank	Bib	Athlete	Country	Notes
1	5	Ricarda Funk	Germany	
2	24	Alena Marx	Switzerland	
3	29	Olga Samková	Czech Republic	
4	8	Zuzana Paňková	Slovakia	

Race 2
Rank	Bib	Athlete	Country	Notes
1	23	Noemie Fox	Australia	
2	3	Miren Lazkano	Spain	
3	2	Lois Leaver	Great Britain	
4	14	Soňa Stanovská	Slovakia	

=== Small final ===
Rank	Bib	Athlete	Country	Notes
1	2	Lois Leaver	Great Britain	
2	29	Olga Samková	Czech Republic	
3	14	Soňa Stanovská	Slovakia	
4	8	Zuzana Paňková	Slovakia	FLT (6)

=== Final ===
Rank	Bib	Athlete	Country	Notes
1st place, gold medalist(s)	24	Alena Marx	Switzerland	
2nd place, silver medalist(s)	23	Noemie Fox	Australia	
3rd place, bronze medalist(s)	3	Miren Lazkano	Spain	
4	5	Ricarda Funk	Germany	RAL

=== Final ranking (Top 42) ===
The top 42 ranking determined by the knockout rounds.

Rank	Athlete	Country	Heat rank
1st place, gold medalist(s)	Alena Marx	Switzerland	1
2nd place, silver medalist(s)	Noemie Fox	Australia	2
3rd place, bronze medalist(s)	Miren Lazkano	Spain	3
4	Ricarda Funk	Germany	4 (RAL)
5	Lois Leaver	Great Britain	1
6	Olga Samková	Czech Republic	2
7	Soňa Stanovská	Slovakia	3
8	Zuzana Paňková	Slovakia	4
9	Andrea Herzog	Germany	QF4 (3)
10	Viktoriia Us	Ukraine	QF3 (3)
11	Kateřina Beková	Czech Republic	QF2 (3)
12	Kahlia Cullwick	New Zealand	QF1 (3)
13	Jessica Fox	Australia	QF1 (4)
14	Kimberley Woods	Great Britain	QF3 (4)
15	Laia Sorribes	Spain	QF2 (4)
16	Klaudia Zwolińska	Poland	QF4 (4)
17	Marjorie Delassus	France	H2 (3)
18	Lois Betteridge	Canada	H7 (3)
19	Omira Estácia Neta	Brazil	H1 (3)
20	Svenja Matti	Switzerland	H4 (3)
21	Aki Yazawa	Japan	H3 (3)
22	Kseniia Krylova	Individual Neutral Athletes	H6 (3)
23	Xu Linxi	China	H5 (3)
24	Chen Lin	China	H8 (3)
25	Camille Prigent	France	H4 (4)
26	Maialen Chourraut	Spain	H8 (4)
27	Dominika Brzeska	Poland	H1 (4)
28	Nikita Setchell	Great Britain	H5 (4)
29	Annkatrin Plochmann	Germany	H6 (4)
30	Evy Leibfarth	United States	H2 (RAL)
31	Ana Sátila	Brazil	H7 (4)
32	Li Shiting	China	H3 (4)
33	Cleo Pitcher Farrell	Ireland	RE (3)
34	Ada Mackie	Australia	RE (3)
35	Wu Ting-i	Chinese Taipei	RE (3)
36	Marcella Altman	United States	RE (3)
37	Anastassiya Ananyeva	Kazakhstan	RE (3)
38	Eliška Mintálová	Slovakia	RE (4)
39	Isabella Altman	United States	RE (4)
40	Mine Onozawa	Japan	RE (4)
41	Lena Teunissen	Netherlands	RE (4)
42	Florencia Aguirre González	Chile	RE (4)
