= 2025 ICF Canoe Slalom World Championships – Women's kayak cross individual =

Women's kayak cross individual at the 2025 ICF Canoe Slalom World Championships
- Venue: Penrith Whitewater Stadium
- Location: Penrith, Australia
- Dates: 29 September 2025
- Competitors: 51 from 27 nations

Medalists
gold medal	Alena Marx	Switzerland
silver medal	Ajda Novak	Slovenia
bronze medal	Ana Sátila	Brazil

The women's kayak cross individual event at the 2025 ICF Canoe Slalom World Championships took place on 29 September 2025 at the Penrith Whitewater Stadium in Penrith. It was the first time that medals were awarded for the time trial part of a kayak cross event at the World Championships.

== Competition format ==
The kayak cross individual time trial event is a single run competition which also serves as the qualification for the kayak cross event where 4 paddlers race each other head-to-head. Top 42 paddlers from the kayak cross individual time trial advanced to the knockout phase at these championships.

Paddlers start their run by sliding off the starting platform several meters above the water. Then they must navigate the downstream and upstream gates. Unlike in classic slalom, paddlers are allowed to touch the gates and even intentionally move them with their paddle, but not with a free hand. There is also a designated zone where paddlers must perform an Eskimo roll.

Athletes can be penalized by receiving a fault (FLT). Faults are incurred for false starts, missing gates or failing to correctly perform the Eskimo roll. Athletes are ranked according to the time they achieve, with those incurring faults ranked at the bottom.

== Results ==
Top 42 qualified for the kayak cross event.

Rank	Bib	Athlete	Nation	Time	Notes
1st place, gold medalist(s)	5	Alena Marx	Switzerland	62.09	Q
2nd place, silver medalist(s)	25	Ajda Novak	Slovenia	63.07	Q
3rd place, bronze medalist(s)	16	Ana Sátila	Brazil	63.23	Q
4	21	Andrea Herzog	Germany	63.28	Q
5	4	Noemie Fox	Australia	63.35	Q
6	2	Angèle Hug	France	63.46	Q
7	9	Emma Vuitton	France	63.48	Q
8	10	Nikita Setchell	Great Britain	63.71	Q
9	15	Mònica Dòria	Andorra	64.03	Q
10	11	Klaudia Zwolińska	Poland	64.19	Q
11	8	Evy Leibfarth	United States	64.23	Q
12	19	Chiara Sabattini	Italy	64.27	Q
13	17	Miren Lazkano	Spain	65.10	Q
14	12	Tereza Kneblová	Czech Republic	65.22	Q
15	1	Kimberley Woods	Great Britain	65.64	Q
16	31	Soňa Stanovská	Slovakia	65.96	Q
17	6	Maialen Chourraut	Spain	66.43	Q
18	30	Zuzana Paňková	Slovakia	66.76	Q
19	3	Camille Prigent	France	67.06	Q
20	39	Amálie Hilgertová	Czech Republic	67.35	Q
21	36	Aleksandra Góra	Poland	67.50	Q
22	26	Nele Bayn	Germany	67.90	Q
23	34	Laia Sorribes	Spain	67.96	Q
24	46	Kseniia Krylova	Individual Neutral Athletes	68.01	Q
25	14	Omira Estácia Neta	Brazil	68.30	Q
26	24	Lena Teunissen	Netherlands	68.91	Q
27	18	Lois Leaver	Great Britain	69.20	Q
28	35	Dominika Brzeska	Poland	69.31	Q
29	27	Viktoriia Us	Ukraine	70.41	Q
30	48	Chang Chu-han	Chinese Taipei	71.24	Q
31	37	Rosie Rex	New Zealand	71.25	Q
32	51	Mariia Sokolova	Individual Neutral Athletes	71.77	Q
33	29	Marcella Altman	United States	72.53	Q
34	7	Ricarda Funk	Germany	72.99	Q
35	28	Sofía Reinoso	Mexico	73.06	Q
36	40	Courtney Williams	New Zealand	73.82	Q
37	32	Codie Davidson	Australia	78.01	Q
38	13	Xie Xueting	China	78.24	Q
39	41	Cleo Pitcher Farrell	Ireland	78.42	Q
40	44	Waris Mills	South Africa	81.17	Q
41	23	Li Shiting	China	81.30	Q
42	38	Laura Plata	Colombia	86.98	Q
43	49	Blandine Xhemajlji	Kosovo	80.08	FLT (R)
44	22	Olga Samková	Czech Republic	63.86	FLT (7)
45	45	Wu Ting-i	Chinese Taipei	70.22	FLT (6)
46	20	Eva Alina Hočevar	Slovenia	63.57	FLT (2)
47	47	Alsu Minazova	Individual Neutral Athletes	69.56	FLT (2)
48	42	Emanuela Luknárová	Slovakia	70.78	FLT (2)
49	43	Aki Yazawa	Japan	71.59	FLT (2)
50	33	Georgia O'Callaghan	Australia	68.05	FLT (2, 7)
51	50	Michelle Wambui Kuria	Kenya	80.02	FLT (1, 2, 3, 5, 6, 7, R, 8)
