= 2026 ICF Canoe Slalom World Championships – Women's kayak cross individual =

Women's kayak cross individual at the 2026 ICF Canoe Slalom World Championships
- Venue: RIVERSPORT OKC
- Location: Oklahoma City, Oklahoma, United States
- Dates: 20 July 2026
- Competitors: 61 from 29 nations

Medalists
gold medal	Jessica Fox	Australia
silver medal	Kateřina Beková	Czech Republic
bronze medal	Lois Leaver	Great Britain

The women's kayak cross individual event at the 2026 ICF Canoe Slalom World Championships took place on 20 July 2026 at the RIVERSPORT OKC in Oklahoma City.

== Competition format ==
The kayak cross individual time trial event is a single run competition which also serves as the qualification for the kayak cross event where 4 paddlers race each other head-to-head. Top 42 paddlers from the kayak cross individual time trial advanced to the knockout phase at these championships.

Paddlers start their run by sliding off the starting platform several meters above the water. Then they must navigate the downstream and upstream gates. Unlike in classic slalom, paddlers are allowed to touch the gates and even intentionally move them with their paddle, but not with a free hand. There is also a designated zone where paddlers must perform a Kayak roll.

Athletes can be penalized by receiving a fault (FLT). Faults are incurred for false starts, missing gates or failing to correctly perform the kayak roll. Athletes are ranked according to the time they achieve, with those incurring faults ranked at the bottom.

== Results ==
Top 42 qualified for the kayak cross event.

Rank	Bib	Athlete	Nation	Time	Notes
1st place, gold medalist(s)	28	Jessica Fox	Australia	51.05	Q
2nd place, silver medalist(s)	17	Kateřina Beková	Czech Republic	51.08	Q
3rd place, bronze medalist(s)	18	Lois Leaver	Great Britain	51.17	Q
4	21	Miren Lazkano	Spain	51.79	Q
5	2	Camille Prigent	France	52.25	Q
6	6	Ricarda Funk	Germany	52.45	Q
7	38	Laia Sorribes	Spain	52.58	Q
8	3	Kimberley Woods	Great Britain	52.75	Q
9	29	Soňa Stanovská	Slovakia	52.90	Q
10	5	Maialen Chourraut	Spain	52.93	Q
11	10	Noemie Fox	Australia	53.03	Q
12	7	Alena Marx	Switzerland	53.17	Q
13	15	Andrea Herzog	Germany	53.28	Q
14	16	Omira Estácia Neta	Brazil	53.32	Q
15	33	Dominika Brzeska	Poland	53.38	Q
16	8	Klaudia Zwolińska	Poland	53.47	Q
17	4	Evy Leibfarth	United States	54.20	Q
18	43	Eliška Mintálová	Slovakia	54.78	Q
19	12	Ana Sátila	Brazil	54.93	Q
20	22	Li Shiting	China	55.00	Q
21	24	Zuzana Paňková	Slovakia	55.17	Q
22	23	Olga Samková	Czech Republic	55.66	Q
23	32	Marjorie Delassus	France	55.66	Q
24	52	Xu Linxi	China	55.95	Q
25	44	Lois Betteridge	Canada	55.96	Q
26	14	Nikita Setchell	Great Britain	56.50	Q
27	11	Viktoriia Us	Ukraine	56.83	Q
28	34	Svenja Matti	Switzerland	56.87	Q
29	50	Cleo Pitcher Farrell	Ireland	56.89	Q
30	42	Ada Mackie	Australia	57.43	Q
31	31	Chen Lin	China	57.65	Q
32	45	Kseniia Krylova	Individual Neutral Athletes	58.03	Q
33	48	Aki Yazawa	Japan	58.33	Q
34	26	Annkatrin Plochmann	Germany	58.54	Q
35	51	Wu Ting-i	Chinese Taipei	59.16	Q
36	27	Marcella Altman	United States	61.32	Q
37	35	Isabella Altman	United States	62.23	Q
38	56	Mine Onozawa	Japan	64.36	Q
39	47	Kahlia Cullwick	New Zealand	64.61	Q
40	20	Lena Teunissen	Netherlands	65.44	Q
41	30	Florencia Aguirre González	Chile	65.83	Q
42	46	Anastassiya Ananyeva	Kazakhstan	66.52	Q
43	55	Kurumi Ito	Japan	67.02	
44	41	Yekaterina Tarantseva	Kazakhstan	67.08	
45	59	Georgia Rellia	Greece	69.03	
46	25	Rosie Rex	New Zealand	69.25	
47	60	Ana Paula Fernandes Castro	Paraguay	72.66	
48	58	Alua Mauletkan	Kazakhstan	73.59	
49	61	Sára Szijjártó-Szabó	Hungary	79.13	
50	40	Waris Mills	South Africa	81.22	
51	19	Eva Alina Hočevar	Slovenia	54.77	FLT (6)
52	36	Léa Baldoni	Canada	63.06	FLT (6)
53	49	Mariia Sokolova	Individual Neutral Athletes	62.05	FLT (3)
54	9	Tereza Kneblová	Czech Republic	66.77	FLT (3)
55	53	Chang Chu-Han	Chinese Taipei	59.50	FLT (2)
56	1	Angèle Hug	France	50.60	FLT (S)
57	13	Mònica Dòria	Andorra	59.01	FLT (S)
58	54	Georgina Cochrane	Ireland	59.81	FLT (S)
59	57	Eliza Tare	Latvia	66.17	FLT (S)
60	37	Lea Novak	Slovenia	65.68	FLT (S, 3, 6)
61	39	Alsu Minazova	Individual Neutral Athletes	DSQ	
