= 2022 ICF Canoe Slalom World Championships – Women's extreme kayak =

Women's extreme kayak at the 2022 ICF Canoe Slalom World Championships
- Venue: Augsburg Eiskanal
- Location: Augsburg, Germany
- Dates: 30-31 July 2022
- Competitors: 75 from 34 nations

Medalists
gold medal	Jessica Fox	Australia
silver medal	Kimberley Woods	Great Britain
bronze medal	Mònica Dòria Vilarrubla	Andorra

The women's extreme kayak event at the 2022 ICF Canoe Slalom World Championships took place on 31 July 2022 at the Augsburg Eiskanal in Augsburg, with the time trials on 30 July 2022.

== Competition format ==
The extreme kayak event is split into two phases - qualification time trials and knockout phase where 4 paddlers race each other head-to-head. Top 20 paddlers from the qualification advance to the knockout phase plus the 12 next fastest paddlers from countries that have not qualified in the top 20. There are 8 heats in the first round of the knockout phase with the top 2 paddlers from each heat advancing to the next round. The same rules apply in quarterfinals and semifinals.

Paddlers start their run by sliding off the starting platform several meters above the water. Then they must navigate the downstream and upstream gates. Unlike in classic slalom, paddlers are allowed to touch the gates and even intentionally move them with their paddle, but not with a free hand. There is also a designated zone where paddlers must perform an Eskimo roll.

Athletes can be penalized in three ways in each round, by receiving a fault (FLT) or by being ranked as lower (RAL). Faults are incurred for false starts, missing gates or failing to correctly perform the Eskimo roll. Athletes are ranked as lower (RAL) if they breach the safety requirements of the competition, such as by holding back another athlete with their hands or paddle, deliberately paddling over another athlete's boat, or by making dangerous contact with another athlete's head or body - all other non-dangerous contact is allowed. In each round athletes are ranked first by the order in which they cross the finish line, with those incurring penalties ranked in the following order: FLT, RAL, DNF, DNS.

The final classification of athletes is determined in the following manner: Athletes eliminated at any phase of the competition will be given their rank based on the comparison of the qualification times of athletes eliminated at the same phase. All 3rd ranked athletes will be ranked above all 4th ranked athletes. The final rank of athletes who did not progress to the heats is determined by their qualification results.

== Schedule ==
All times are Central European Summer Time (UTC+2)

Date	Time	Round
30 July 2022
30 July 2022	16:00	Time trials
31 July 2022
31 July 2022	15:00	Heats
31 July 2022	16:04	Quarterfinals
31 July 2022	16:39	Semifinals
31 July 2022	16:59	Final

== Results ==
=== Time trials ===
Top 20 qualify automatically. The last 12 spots go to fastest paddlers from countries not yet qualified.

Rank	Bib	Athlete	Country	Time	Notes
1	1	Jessica Fox	Australia	66.44	Q
2	7	Ana Sátila	Brazil	66.57	Q
3	24	Eva Terčelj	Slovenia	67.61	Q
4	30	Ricarda Funk	Germany	67.64	Q
5	48	Omira Estácia Neta	Brazil	68.37	Q
6	8	Camille Prigent	France	68.46	Q
7	3	Kimberley Woods	Great Britain	68.69	Q
8	29	Corinna Kuhnle	Austria	68.83	Q
9	2	Martina Wegman	Netherlands	68.91	Q
10	21	Nikita Setchell	Great Britain	68.93	Q
11	54	Maialen Chourraut	Spain	69.03	Q
12	37	Romane Prigent	France	69.10	Q
13	51	Alena Marx	Switzerland	69.25	Q
14	53	Lucie Baudu	France	69.40	Q
15	13	Viktoriia Us	Ukraine	69.48	Q
16	9	Miren Lazkano	Spain	69.87	Q
17	47	Eliška Mintálová	Slovakia	69.98	Q
18	18	Hannah Thomas	New Zealand	70.09	Q
19	10	Marjorie Delassus	France	70.39	Q
20	49	Zuzana Paňková	Slovakia	70.42	Q
21	16	Caroline Trompeter	Germany	70.45	FR: 33
22	38	Yan Jiahua	China	70.46	Q
23	36	Antonie Galušková	Czech Republic	70.51	Q
24	33	Viktoria Wolffhardt	Austria	70.95	FR: 34
25	50	Stefanie Horn	Italy	71.11	Q
26	32	Megan Hamer-Evans	Great Britain	71.13	FR: 35
27	14	Ajda Novak	Slovenia	71.24	FR: 36
28	27	Klara Olazabal	Spain	71.28	FR: 37
29	4	Evy Leibfarth	United States	71.38	Q
29	11	Elena Lilik	Germany	71.38	FR: 38
31	65	Jasmin Schornberg	Germany	71.52	FR: 39
32	43	Barbora Valíková	Czech Republic	71.85	FR: 40
33	20	Soňa Stanovská	Slovakia	71.89	FR: 41
34	23	Mònica Dòria Vilarrubla	Andorra	72.38	Q
35	40	Lena Teunissen	Netherlands	72.44	FR: 42
36	46	Naemi Brändle	Switzerland	72.45	FR: 43
37	31	Klaudia Zwolińska	Poland	72.49	Q
38	12	Martina Satková	Czech Republic	72.66	FR: 44
39	72	Carole Bouzidi	Algeria	72.89	Q
40	26	Léa Baldoni	Canada	73.28	Q
41	52	Kate Eckhardt	Australia	73.42	FR: 45
42	75	Florence Maheu	Canada	73.90	FR: 46
43	22	Laura Pellicer Chica	Andorra	74.53	FR: 47
44	28	Aleksandra Stach	Poland	75.53	FR: 48
45	35	Johanna Köcher	Switzerland	75.67	FR: 49
46	59	Kurumi Ito	Japan	75.79	Q
47	15	Lois Betteridge	Canada	76.58	FR: 50
48	61	Janina Kriesinger	Belgium	76.70	Q
49	25	Eva Alina Hočevar	Slovenia	77.21	FR: 51
50	56	Michaela Haššová	Slovakia	78.56	FR: 52
51	45	Zou Xiaolin	China	79.16	FR: 53
52	19	Olatz Arregui	Spain	79.60	FR: 54
53	34	Sofía Reinoso	Mexico	83.05	Q
54	42	Zita Mária Lakner	Hungary	86.61	Q
55	63	Iris Sommernes	Norway	87.29	
56	62	Anastassiya Ananyeva	Kazakhstan	87.82	
57	67	Pipi Uhl	New Zealand	88.57	
58	74	Yekaterina Tarantseva	Kazakhstan	89.51	
59	71	Lenny Carmen Ramirez Bustillos	Peru	95.88	
60	41	Ria Sribar	United States	70.41	FLT (5)
61	57	River Mutton	New Zealand	86.23	FLT (5)
62	73	Ana Fernandes Castro	Paraguay	90.98	FLT (5)
63	64	Bhumi Baghel	India	114.66	FLT (2)
64	69	Naina Adhikari	India	132.08	FLT (2)
65	6	Tereza Fišerová	Czech Republic	68.29	FLT (1)
66	5	Noemie Fox	Australia	70.12	FLT (1)
67	17	Mallory Franklin	Great Britain	70.81	FLT (1)
68	44	Viktoriia Dobrotvorska	Ukraine	81.02	FLT (1)
69	66	Natalia Pacierpnik	Poland	79.31	FLT (R)
70	70	Veronika Šalaševičiūtė-Turbinova	Lithuania	124.06	FLT (R)
71	58	Roxana Razeghian	Iran	-	DNF
-	39	Li Tong	China	-	DNS
-	55	Georgia Morou	Greece	-	DNS
-	68	Katja Bengeri	Croatia	-	DNS
-	60	Aki Yazawa	Japan	-	DNS

=== Knockout rounds ===
==== Heats ====
Heat 1

Rank	Bib	Name	Country	Notes
1	1	Jessica Fox	Australia	Q
2	17	Eliška Mintálová	Slovakia	Q
3	16	Miren Lazkano	Spain	FLT (4)
4	32	Zita Mária Lakner	Hungary	FLT (3)

Heat 2

Rank	Bib	Name	Country	Notes
1	25	Mònica Dòria Vilarrubla	Andorra	Q
2	8	Corinna Kuhnle	Austria	Q
3	24	Evy Leibfarth	United States	FLT (3)
4	9	Martina Wegman	Netherlands	FLT (R)

Heat 3

Rank	Bib	Name	Country	Notes
1	28	Léa Baldoni	Canada	Q
2	21	Yan Jiahua	China	Q
3	12	Romane Prigent	France	
4	5	Omira Estácia Neta	Brazil	FLT (3)

Heat 4

Rank	Bib	Name	Country	Notes
1	4	Ricarda Funk	Germany	Q
2	20	Zuzana Paňková	Slovakia	Q
3	13	Alena Marx	Switzerland	
4	29	Kurumi Ito	Japan	

Heat 5

Rank	Bib	Name	Country	Notes
1	3	Eva Terčelj	Slovenia	Q
2	14	Lucie Baudu	France	Q
3	30	Janina Kriesinger	Belgium	FLT (5)
4	19	Marjorie Delassus	France	FLT (3)

Heat 6

Rank	Bib	Name	Country	Notes
1	11	Maialen Chourraut	Spain	Q
2	27	Carole Bouzidi	Algeria	Q
3	6	Camille Prigent	France	
4	22	Antonie Galušková	Czech Republic	

Heat 7

Rank	Bib	Name	Country	Notes
1	26	Klaudia Zwolińska	Poland	Q
2	7	Kimberley Woods	Great Britain	Q
3	23	Stefanie Horn	Italy	
4	10	Nikita Setchell	Great Britain	

Heat 8

Rank	Bib	Name	Country	Notes
1	15	Viktoriia Us	Ukraine	Q
2	2	Ana Sátila	Brazil	Q
3	18	Hannah Thomas	New Zealand	
4	31	Sofía Reinoso	Mexico	FLT (3)

==== Quarterfinals ====
Quarterfinal 1

Rank	Bib	Name	Country	Notes
1	25	Mònica Dòria Vilarrubla	Andorra	Q
2	1	Jessica Fox	Australia	Q
3	17	Eliška Mintálová	Slovakia	FLT (6)
4	8	Corinna Kuhnle	Austria	FLT (2)

Quarterfinal 2

Rank	Bib	Name	Country	Notes
1	4	Ricarda Funk	Germany	Q
2	21	Yan Jiahua	China	Q
3	28	Léa Baldoni	Canada	
4	20	Zuzana Paňková	Slovakia	

Quarterfinal 3

Rank	Bib	Name	Country	Notes
1	3	Eva Terčelj	Slovenia	Q
2	14	Lucie Baudu	France	Q
3	11	Maialen Chourraut	Spain	
4	27	Carole Bouzidi	Algeria	

Quarterfinal 4

Rank	Bib	Name	Country	Notes
1	7	Kimberley Woods	Great Britain	Q
2	2	Ana Sátila	Brazil	Q
3	15	Viktoriia Us	Ukraine	
4	26	Klaudia Zwolińska	Poland	

==== Semifinals ====
Semifinal 1

Rank	Bib	Name	Country	Notes
1	1	Jessica Fox	Australia	Q
2	25	Mònica Dòria Vilarrubla	Andorra	Q
3	21	Yan Jiahua	China	FLT (3)
4	4	Ricarda Funk	Germany	FLT (R)

Semifinal 2

Rank	Bib	Name	Country	Notes
1	7	Kimberley Woods	Great Britain	Q
2	2	Ana Sátila	Brazil	Q
3	3	Eva Terčelj	Slovenia	
4	14	Lucie Baudu	France	FLT (3)

==== Final ====
Rank	Bib	Name	Country	Notes
1st place, gold medalist(s)	1	Jessica Fox	Australia	
2nd place, silver medalist(s)	7	Kimberley Woods	Great Britain	
3rd place, bronze medalist(s)	25	Mònica Dòria Vilarrubla	Andorra	
4	2	Ana Sátila	Brazil	RAL

=== Final ranking (Top 32) ===
The top 32 ranking determined by the knockout rounds. Bib numbers correspond to seeding after time trials.

Rank	Bib	Athlete	Country	Heat rank
1st place, gold medalist(s)	1	Jessica Fox	Australia	1
2nd place, silver medalist(s)	7	Kimberley Woods	Great Britain	2
3rd place, bronze medalist(s)	25	Mònica Dòria Vilarrubla	Andorra	3
4	2	Ana Sátila	Brazil	4
5	3	Eva Terčelj	Slovenia	SF2 (3)
6	21	Yan Jiahua	China	SF1 (3)
7	4	Ricarda Funk	Germany	SF1 (4)
8	14	Lucie Baudu	France	SF2 (4)
9	11	Maialen Chourraut	Spain	QF3 (3)
10	15	Viktoriia Us	Ukraine	QF4 (3)
11	17	Eliška Mintálová	Slovakia	QF1 (3)
12	28	Léa Baldoni	Canada	QF2 (3)
13	8	Corinna Kuhnle	Austria	QF1 (4)
14	20	Zuzana Paňková	Slovakia	QF2 (4)
15	26	Klaudia Zwolińska	Poland	QF4 (4)
16	27	Carole Bouzidi	Algeria	QF3 (4)
17	6	Camille Prigent	France	H6 (3)
18	12	Romane Prigent	France	H3 (3)
19	13	Alena Marx	Switzerland	H4 (3)
20	16	Miren Lazkano	Spain	H1 (3)
21	18	Hannah Thomas	New Zealand	H8 (3)
22	23	Stefanie Horn	Italy	H7 (3)
23	24	Evy Leibfarth	United States	H2 (3)
24	30	Janina Kriesinger	Belgium	H5 (3)
25	5	Omira Estácia Neta	Brazil	H3 (4)
26	9	Martina Wegman	Netherlands	H2 (4)
27	10	Nikita Setchell	Great Britain	H7 (4)
28	19	Marjorie Delassus	France	H5 (4)
29	22	Antonie Galušková	Czech Republic	H6 (4)
30	29	Kurumi Ito	Japan	H4 (4)
31	31	Sofía Reinoso	Mexico	H8 (4)
32	32	Zita Mária Lakner	Hungary	H1 (4)
