= Canoe slalom at the 2023 European Games – Women's C1 =

Women's canoe at the 2023 European Games
- Venue: Kraków-Kolna Canoe Slalom Course
- Date: 30 June - 2 July
- Competitors: 36 from 16 nations

Medalists
gold medal	Elena Lilik	Germany
silver medal	Klaudia Zwolińska	Poland
bronze medal	Mallory Franklin	Great Britain

The canoe slalom women's canoe event at the 2023 European Games took place on 2 July 2023 at the Kraków-Kolna Canoe Slalom Course in Kraków, with the qualification heats on 30 June 2023.

== Competition format ==
The event uses a three-round format with qualification heats, semifinal and final. Paddlers complete up to two runs in the heats, with the top ranked athletes starting last. In the first heat, the 20 fastest paddlers qualify automatically for the semifinal, whilst the rest compete in the second heat for additional 10 qualification spots. The final rank of non-qualifying athletes is determined by their second run score. Paddlers start in the reverse order of their heats position in the semifinal and complete a single run, with the top 10 advancing to the final. The start list for the final is once again in reverse order of the semifinal results. The athlete with the best time in the single-run final is awarded gold.

A penalty of 2 seconds is awarded for touching a gate and a 50-second penalty is awarded for missing a gate or negotiating it in the opposite direction.

An easier gate setup is generally used for the heats and then a more difficult one for semifinal and final.

== Schedule ==
All times are Central European Summer Time (UTC+2)

Date	Time	Round
30 June 2023
30 June 2023	10:25	Heats Run 1
30 June 2023	11:35	Heats Run 2
2 July 2023
2 July 2023	10:10	Semifinal
2 July 2023	12:10	Final

== Results ==
Penalties are included in the time shown. The fastest time in each round is shown in bold.

Rank	Bib	Athlete	Country	Heats						Semifinal			Final		
Rank	Bib	Athlete	Country	Run 1			Run 2			Semifinal			Final		
Rank	Bib	Athlete	Country	Time	Pen	Rank	Time	Pen	Rank	Time	Pen	Rank	Time	Pen	Rank
1st place, gold medalist(s)	4	Elena Lilik	Germany	**102.06**	2	1	-			**110.04**	0	1	**109.67**	2	1
2nd place, silver medalist(s)	18	Klaudia Zwolińska	Poland	106.55	2	8	-			114.64	2	9	110.29	0	2
3rd place, bronze medalist(s)	3	Mallory Franklin	Great Britain	105.78	6	7	-			115.36	2	10	113.63	6	3
4	5	Gabriela Satková	Czechia	108.61	2	12	-			111.14	0	4	113.86	0	4
5	9	Zuzana Paňková	Slovakia	105.58	2	6	-			112.45	2	5	115.41	2	5
6	13	Eva Alina Hočevar	Slovenia	117.19	6	28	113.82	4	8	114.48	2	8	115.71	4	6
7	28	Elena Micozzi	Italy	104.73	2	3	-			111.04	0	3	119.24	6	7
8	11	Angèle Hug	France	106.89	2	9	-			114.21	0	7	119.85	4	8
9	6	Marjorie Delassus	France	105.28	2	5	-			113.90	2	6	123.45	4	9
10	8	Mònica Dòria Vilarrubla	Andorra	107.41	2	11	-			110.23	0	2	158.03	50	10
11	30	Soňa Stanovská	Slovakia	107.12	2	10	-			115.86	2	11	did not advance		
12	14	Marta Bertoncelli	Italy	109.24	4	15	-			115.98	0	12	did not advance		
13	25	Núria Vilarrubla	Spain	109.42	4	16	-			116.06	0	13	did not advance		
14	1	Andrea Herzog	Germany	108.67	4	13	-			116.61	2	14	did not advance		
15	31	Nele Bayn	Germany	120.27	8	30	113.21	2	6	117.04	2	15	did not advance		
16	22	Aleksandra Stach	Poland	116.87	8	27	114.89	2	9	117.11	2	16	did not advance		
17	20	Emanuela Luknárová	Slovakia	111.11	2	19	-			117.67	0	17	did not advance		
18	15	Miren Lazkano	Spain	165.62	60	36	111.26	4	4	118.10	4	18	did not advance		
19	2	Tereza Fišerová	Czechia	105.18	2	4	-			118.51	0	19	did not advance		
20	19	Tereza Kneblová	Czechia	103.08	0	2	-			120.38	2	20	did not advance		
21	10	Viktoriia Us	Ukraine	112.42	4	20	-			121.77	8	21	did not advance		
22	7	Kimberley Woods	Great Britain	120.31	4	31	**106.49**	4	1	123.66	4	22	did not advance		
22	26	Alena Marx	Switzerland	113.19	4	22	113.49	4	7	123.66	4	22	did not advance		
24	16	Alja Kozorog	Slovenia	117.54	2	29	110.76	2	3	125.80	4	24	did not advance		
25	21	Lucie Prioux	France	110.00	0	18	-			128.16	2	25	did not advance		
26	29	Viktoriia Dobrotvorska	Ukraine	112.81	2	21	107.09	0	2	132.93	4	26	did not advance		
27	32	Lena Teunissen	Netherlands	108.85	2	14	-			137.12	6	27	did not advance		
28	12	Elena Borghi	Italy	115.83	8	25	112.24	4	5	171.94	52	28	did not advance		
29	23	Viktoria Wolffhardt	Austria	109.91	0	17	-			175.35	50	29	did not advance		
30	33	Michaela Corcoran	Ireland	128.81	8	33	117.04	0	10	181.02	52	30	did not advance		
31	34	Laura Pellicer Chica	Andorra	116.67	0	26	117.19	4	11	did not advance					
32	35	Katja Bengeri	Croatia	125.54	8	32	120.06	8	12	did not advance					
33	17	Ainhoa Lameiro	Spain	114.61	4	24	121.73	10	13	did not advance					
34	24	Lea Novak	Slovenia	164.89	52	35	122.23	8	14	did not advance					
35	27	Sophie Ogilvie	Great Britain	114.19	4	23	124.16	10	15	did not advance					
36	36	Katarzyna Liber	Poland	134.59	4	34	130.99	12	16	did not advance					
