= Eliška Mintálová =

Slovak Canoeist (born 1999)

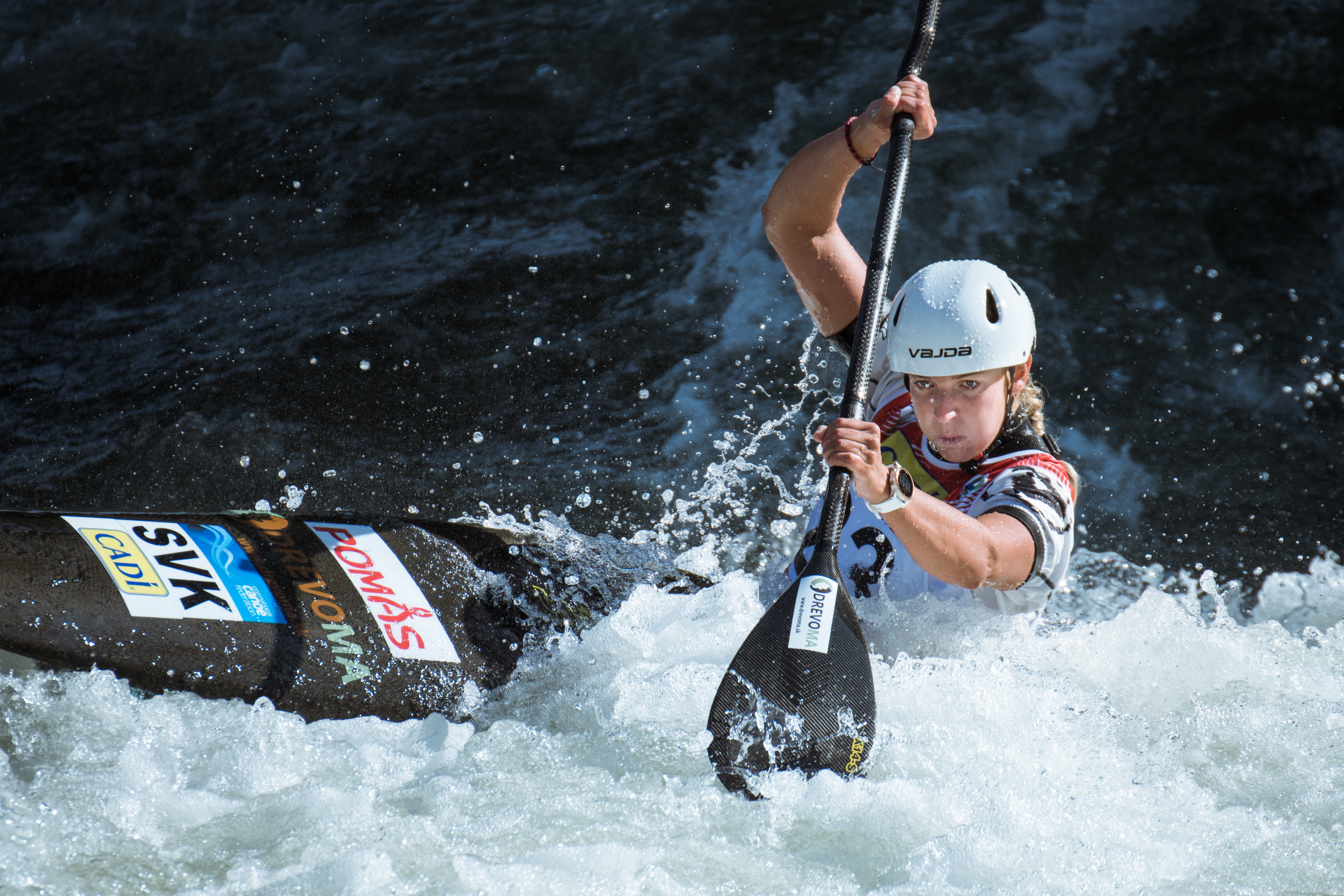
- Mintálová at the 2019 World Championships

Personal information
- Born: 23 March 1999 (age 27) Žilina, Slovakia
- Height: 1.71 m (5 ft 7 in)
- Weight: 61 kg (134 lb)

Sport
- Country: Slovakia
- Sport: Canoe slalom
- Event: K1, Kayak cross
- Club: KTK Dukla Liptovský Mikuláš
Medal record
Women's canoe slalom
Representing Slovakia
World Championships
Silver medal – second place	2023 London	K1
Bronze medal – third place	2021 Bratislava	K1 team
Bronze medal – third place	2026 Oklahoma City	K1 team
European Championships
Gold medal – first place	2022 Liptovský Mikuláš	K1
Gold medal – first place	2026 Ivrea	K1 team
U23 World Championships
Gold medal – first place	2018 Ivrea	K1 team
Gold medal – first place	2022 Ivrea	K1
U23 European Championships
Silver medal – second place	2019 Liptovský Mikuláš	K1 team
Bronze medal – third place	2019 Liptovský Mikuláš	K1
Junior World Championships
Silver medal – second place	2017 Bratislava	K1
Bronze medal – third place	2017 Bratislava	K1 team

Eliška Mintálová (born 23 March 1999) is a Slovak slalom canoeist who has competed at the international level since 2016, specializing in K1 and kayak cross. She is a two-time Olympian and a World Championship medalist.

== Career ==
Mintálová won three medals at the World Championships with a silver in the K1 event in 2023 and two bronzes in the K1 team event (2021 and 2026).

She won a gold medal in the K1 event at the 2022 European Championships in Liptovský Mikuláš and another gold in the K1 team event at the 2026 European Championships in Ivrea.

On 8 May 2021 at the European Canoe Slalom Championships Mintálová finished 11th and secured her qualification for the delayed 2020 Tokyo Olympics.

Mintálová finished in 9th place in the K1 event at the 2020 Summer Olympics. She also competed at the 2024 Summer Olympics, finishing 9th in the K1 event and 27th in kayak cross.

In July 2020 she won the women's Slovak National Championship in the K1, winning by a 10-second margin.

== Personal life ==
Mintálová missed the 2025 international season due to pregnancy and motherhood. She gave birth to her son Noel in May 2025.

== Career statistics ==
=== Major championships results timeline ===
Event		2017	2018	2019	2020	2021	2022	2023	2024	2025	2026
Olympic Games	K1	Not held				9	Not held		9	Not held	
Olympic Games	Kayak cross	Not held							27	Not held	
World Championships	K1	61	31	22	Not held	19	15	2	Not held	—	27
World Championships	Kayak cross	—	—	—	Not held	25	11	11	Not held	—	38
World Championships	Kayak cross individual	Not held								—	18
World Championships	K1 team	7	11	6	Not held	3	5	11	Not held	—	3
European Championships	K1	36	20	10	—	11	1	19 (Note: 2023 European Games)	12	—	13
European Championships	Kayak cross	Not held				—	8	5	6	—	NQ
European Championships	Kayak cross individual	Not held							14	—	DNS
European Championships	K1 team	10	12	6	—	11	7	7	7	—	1

=== World Cup individual podiums ===
Season	Date	Venue	Position	Event
2021	4 September 2021	La Seu d'Urgell	3rd	K1
2023	2 September 2023	La Seu d'Urgell	1st	K1
2026	3 September 2026	Vaires-sur-Marne	2nd	K1
