= Mike Corcoran (canoeist) =

Irish slalom canoeist (born 1965)

Michael Corcoran (born 12 April 1965) is an Irish slalom canoeist who competed from the mid-1980s to the late 1990s. Originally from Dublin in Ireland, he has also lived in Maryland in the US. Competing in two Summer Olympics, Corcoran earned his best finish of tenth in the C1 event in Atlanta in 1996. His twin daughters, Michaela Corcoran and Madison Corcoran, have also competed internationally in canoe slalom events.

== World Cup individual podiums ==
Season	Date	Venue	Position	Event
1993	18 July 1993	La Seu d'Urgell	2nd	C1
