= Canoeing at the 2024 Summer Olympics – Women's slalom kayak cross =

Women's slalom kayak cross at the Games of the XXXIII Olympiad
- Venue: National Olympic Nautical Stadium of Île-de-France, Vaires-sur-Marne
- Dates: 2 August 2024 (time trial); 3 August 2024 (round 1 and repechage); 4 August 2024 (heats); 5 August 2024 (quarterfinal, semifinal, and final)

Medalists
1st place, gold medalist(s)		Noemie Fox	Australia
2nd place, silver medalist(s)		Angèle Hug	France
3rd place, bronze medalist(s)		Kimberley Woods	Great Britain

The women's kayak cross slalom canoeing event at the 2024 Summer Olympics took place from 2 August to 5 August 2024 at the National Olympic Nautical Stadium of Île-de-France in Vaires-sur-Marne.

== Background ==
This was the first appearance of the event.

== Schedule ==
All times are Central European Summer Time (UTC+2)

The women's kayak cross slalom took place over four days.

Date	Time	Round
2 August 2024	16:40	Time trial
3 August 2024	15:30; 18:05	Round 1 Repechage
4 August 2024	16:45	Heats
5 August 2024	15:30; 16:15; 16:43	Quarterfinal; Semifinal; Final

== Results ==
=== Time Trial ===
Time Trial
Rank	Bib	Canoeist	Time	Notes
1	4	Camille Prigent (FRA)	70.33	
2	3	Jessica Fox (AUS)	70.84	
3	21	Mallory Franklin (GBR)	71.85	
4	15	Luuka Jones (NZL)	72.10	
5	12	Ana Sátila (BRA)	72.64	
6	19	Evy Leibfarth (USA)	72.66	
7	5	Ricarda Funk (GER)	72.89	
8	10	Noemie Fox (AUS)	73.09	
9	6	Mònica Dòria (AND)	73.15	
10	8	Angèle Hug (FRA)	73.27	
11	31	Antonie Galušková (CZE)	73.75	
12	2	Eva Terčelj (SLO)	74.00	
13	16	Elena Lilik (GER)	74.19	
14	27	Lena Teunissen (NED)	74.24	
15	22	Miren Lazkano (ESP)	74.77	
16	1	Kimberley Woods (GBR)	74.98	
17	7	Stefanie Horn (ITA)	75.19	
18	18	Klaudia Zwolińska (POL)	75.19	
19	9	Maialen Chourraut (ESP)	75.23	
20	13	Eliška Mintálová (SVK)	75.26	
21	29	Eva Alina Hočevar (SLO)	76.48	
22	30	Corinna Kuhnle (AUT)	76.55	
23	36	Chang Chu-han (TPE)	76.58	
24	24	Carole Bouzidi (ALG)	76.68	
25	37	Li Shiting (CHN)	77.40	
26	14	Viktoriia Us (UKR)	78.18	
27	11	Alena Marx (SUI)	78.29	
28	35	Marta Bertoncelli (ITA)	78.38	
29	23	Martina Wegman (NED)	78.64	
30	17	Zuzana Paňková (SVK)	79.36	
31	32	Aki Yazawa (JPN)	79.96	
32	25	Viktoria Wolffhardt (AUT)	80.83	
33	20	Tereza Fišerová (CZE)	81.17	
34	28	Sofía Reinoso (MEX)	82.99	
35	33	Madison Corcoran (IRL)	83.49	
36	34	Haruka Okazaki (JPN)	84.16	
37	26	Lois Betteridge (CAN)	79.76	FLT (R)

=== Round 1 ===
Proceed to Heats
Proceed to Repechage

Race 1
Rank	Bib	Canoeist	Notes
1	1	Camille Prigent (FRA)	
2	12	Eva Terčelj (SLO)	
3	33	Tereza Fišerová (CZE)	FLT (8)

Race 2
Rank	Bib	Canoeist	Notes
1	13	Elena Lilik (GER)	
2	2	Jessica Fox (AUS)	
3	32	Viktoria Wolffhardt (AUT)	

Race 3
Rank	Bib	Canoeist	Notes
1	3	Mallory Franklin (GBR)	
2	14	Lena Teunissen (NED)	
3	31	Aki Yazawa (JPN)	FLT (4)

Race 4
Rank	Bib	Canoeist	Notes
1	15	Miren Lazkano (ESP)	
2	4	Luuka Jones (NZL)	
3	30	Zuzana Paňková (SVK)	

Race 5
Rank	Bib	Canoeist	Notes
1	16	Kimberley Woods (GBR)	
2	29	Martina Wegman (NED)	
3	5	Ana Sátila (BRA)	FLT (8)

Race 6
Rank	Bib	Canoeist	Notes
1	6	Evy Leibfarth (USA)	
2	28	Marta Bertoncelli (ITA)	
3	17	Stefanie Horn (ITA)	FLT (2)

Race 7
Rank	Bib	Canoeist	Notes
1	7	Ricarda Funk (GER)	
2	27	Alena Marx (SUI)	
3	18	Klaudia Zwolińska (POL)	

Race 8
Rank	Bib	Canoeist	Notes
1	8	Noemie Fox (AUS)	
2	26	Viktoriia Us (UKR)	
3	19	Maialen Chourraut (ESP)	
4	37	Lois Betteridge (CAN)	FLT (4)

Race 9
Rank	Bib	Canoeist	Notes
1	9	Mònica Dòria (AND)	
2	20	Eliška Mintálová (SVK)	
3	25	Li Shiting (CHN)	
4	36	Haruka Okazaki (JPN)	FLT (1)

Race 10
Rank	Bib	Canoeist	Notes
1	10	Angèle Hug (FRA)	
2	24	Carole Bouzidi (ALG)	
3	21	Eva Alina Hočevar (SLO)	FLT (6)
4	35	Madison Corcoran (IRL)	FLT (6)

Race 11
Rank	Bib	Canoeist	Notes
1	11	Antonie Galušková (CZE)	
2	34	Sofía Reinoso (MEX)	
3	23	Chang Chu-han (TPE)	
4	22	Corinna Kuhnle (AUT)	FLT (R,2,3)

=== Repechages ===
Proceed to Heats
Eliminated

Race 1
Rank	Bib	Canoeist	Notes
1	5	Ana Sátila (BRA)	
2	37	Lois Betteridge (CAN)	
3	22	Corinna Kuhnle (AUT)	

Race 2
Rank	Bib	Canoeist	Notes
1	17	Stefanie Horn (ITA)	
2	23	Chang Chu-han (TPE)	
3	36	Haruka Okazaki (JPN)	

Race 3
Rank	Bib	Canoeist	Notes
1	18	Klaudia Zwolińska (POL)	
2	35	Madison Corcoran (IRL)	
3	25	Li Shiting (CHN)	FLT (8)

Race 4
Rank	Bib	Canoeist	Notes
1	33	Tereza Fišerová (CZE)	
2	19	Maialen Chourraut (ESP)	
3	30	Zuzana Paňková (SVK)	

Race 5
Rank	Bib	Canoeist	Notes
1	21	Eva Alina Hočevar (SLO)	
2	32	Viktoria Wolffhardt (AUT)	
3	31	Aki Yazawa (JPN)	

=== Heats ===
Proceed to Quarterfinals
Eliminated

Heat 1
Rank	Bib	Canoeist	Notes
1	1	Camille Prigent (FRA)	
2	17	Carole Bouzidi (ALG)	
3	32	Lois Betteridge (CAN)	
4	16	Eliška Mintálová (SVK)	FLT (8)

Heat 2
Rank	Bib	Canoeist	Notes
1	9	Elena Lilik (GER)	
2	24	Stefanie Horn (ITA)	
3	25	Klaudia Zwolińska (POL)	
4	8	Antonie Galušková (CZE)	FLT (R)

Heat 3
Rank	Bib	Canoeist	Notes
1	5	Noemie Fox (AUS)	
2	28	Maialen Chourraut (ESP)	
3	21	Martina Wegman (NED)	
4	12	Jessica Fox (AUS)	

Heat 4
Rank	Bib	Canoeist	Notes
1	13	Luuka Jones (NZL)	
2	4	Ricarda Funk (GER)	
3	20	Marta Bertoncelli (ITA)	
4	29	Chang Chu-han (TPE)	FLT (R)

Heat 5
Rank	Bib	Canoeist	Notes
1	3	Evy Leibfarth (USA)	
2	19	Alena Marx (SUI)	
3	14	Eva Terčelj (SLO)	
4	30	Viktoria Wolffhardt (AUT)	

Heat 6
Rank	Bib	Canoeist	Notes
1	11	Kimberley Woods (GBR)	
2	6	Mònica Dòria (AND)	
3	27	Tereza Fišerová (CZE)	
4	22	Sofía Reinoso (MEX)	

Heat 7
Rank	Bib	Canoeist	Notes
1	7	Angèle Hug (FRA)	
2	23	Ana Sátila (BRA)	
3	10	Miren Lazkano (ESP)	
4	26	Eva Alina Hočevar (SLO)	FLT (6)

Heat 8
Rank	Bib	Canoeist	Notes
1	2	Mallory Franklin (GBR)	
2	18	Viktoriia Us (UKR)	
3	15	Lena Teunissen (NED)	
4	31	Madison Corcoran (IRL)	

=== Quarterfinals ===
Proceed to Semifinals
Eliminated

Quarterfinal 1
Rank	Bib	Canoeist	Notes
1	9	Elena Lilik (GER)	
2	17	Carole Bouzidi (ALG)	
3	1	Camille Prigent (FRA)	
4	24	Stefanie Horn (ITA)	

Quarterfinal 2
Rank	Bib	Canoeist	Notes
1	5	Noemie Fox (AUS)	
2	13	Luuka Jones (NZL)	
3	28	Maialen Chourraut (ESP)	
4	4	Ricarda Funk (GER)	FLT (5)

Quarterfinal 3
Rank	Bib	Canoeist	Notes
1	11	Kimberley Woods (GBR)	
2	19	Alena Marx (SUI)	
3	3	Evy Leibfarth (USA)	
4	6	Mònica Dòria (AND)	FLT (2)

Quarterfinal 4
Rank	Bib	Canoeist	Notes
1	7	Angèle Hug (FRA)	
2	23	Ana Sátila (BRA)	
3	18	Viktoriia Us (UKR)	
4	2	Mallory Franklin (GBR)	FLT (R)

=== Semifinals ===
Proceed to Finals
Eliminated

Semifinal 1
Rank	Bib	Canoeist	Notes
1	5	Noemie Fox (AUS)	
2	9	Elena Lilik (GER)	
3	17	Carole Bouzidi (ALG)	FLT (6)
4	13	Luuka Jones (NZL)	FLT (5)

Semifinal 2
Rank	Bib	Canoeist	Notes
1	11	Kimberley Woods (GBR)	
2	7	Angèle Hug (FRA)	
3	23	Ana Sátila (BRA)	
4	19	Alena Marx (SUI)	

=== Finals ===
Final
Rank	Bib	Canoeist	Notes
1st place, gold medalist(s)	5	Noemie Fox (AUS)	
2nd place, silver medalist(s)	7	Angèle Hug (FRA)	
3rd place, bronze medalist(s)	11	Kimberley Woods (GBR)	
4	9	Elena Lilik (GER)	FLT (2)

Small Final
Rank	Bib	Canoeist	Notes
1	13	Luuka Jones (NZL)	
2	19	Alena Marx (SUI)	
3	17	Carole Bouzidi (ALG)	
4	23	Ana Sátila (BRA)	

=== Final Ranking ===
Final Ranking
Rank	Bib	Canoeist
1st place, gold medalist(s)	5	Noemie Fox (AUS)
2nd place, silver medalist(s)	7	Angèle Hug (FRA)
3rd place, bronze medalist(s)	11	Kimberley Woods (GBR)
4	9	Elena Lilik (GER)
5	13	Luuka Jones (NZL)
6	19	Alena Marx (SUI)
7	17	Carole Bouzidi (ALG)
8	23	Ana Sátila (BRA)
9	1	Camille Prigent (FRA)
10	3	Evy Leibfarth (USA)
11	18	Viktoriia Us (UKR)
12	28	Maialen Chourraut (ESP)
13	2	Mallory Franklin (GBR)
14	4	Ricarda Funk (GER)
15	6	Mònica Dòria (AND)
16	24	Stefanie Horn (ITA)
17	22	Miren Lazkano (ESP)
18	2	Eva Terčelj (SLO)
19	27	Lena Teunissen (NED)
20	35	Marta Bertoncelli (ITA)
21	23	Martina Wegman (NED)
22	18	Klaudia Zwolińska (POL)
23	20	Tereza Fišerová (CZE)
24	26	Lois Betteridge (CAN)
25	31	Antonie Galušková (CZE)
26	3	Jessica Fox (AUS)
27	13	Eliška Mintálová (SVK)
28	28	Sofía Reinoso (MEX)
29	29	Eva Alina Hočevar (SLO)
30	36	Chang Chu-han (TPE)
31	25	Viktoria Wolffhardt (AUT)
32	33	Madison Corcoran (IRL)
33	30	Corinna Kuhnle (AUT)
34	37	Li Shiting (CHN)
35	17	Zuzana Paňková (SVK)
36	32	Aki Yazawa (JPN)
37	34	Haruka Okazaki (JPN)
