= Canoeing at the 2019 Pan American Games – Women's slalom C-1 =

Women's canoe slalom C-1 at the 2019 Pan American Games
- Venue: Cañete River, Lunahuaná
- Date: 3-4 August
- Competitors: 7 from 7 nations
- Winning time: 95.35

Medalists
Gold medal	Ana Sátila	Brazil
Silver medal	Lois Betteridge	Canada
Bronze medal	Michaela Corcoran	United States

The women's canoe slalom C-1 competition at the 2019 Pan American Games in Lima took place between 3 and 4 August at the Cañete River in Lunahuaná.

The gold medal was won by Ana Sátila of the Brazil.

== Schedule ==
All times are Local Time (UTC−5).

Date	Time	Round
Saturday, 3 August 2019	9:48	Heats
Sunday, 4 August 2019	9:46	Semi-final
Sunday, 4 August 2019	11:29	Final

== Results ==
Rank	Name	Preliminary Heats						Semifinal			Final	
Rank	Name	1st Ride	Pen.	2nd Ride	Pen.	Best	Rank	Time	Pen.	Rank	Time	Pen.
1st place, gold medalist(s)	Ana Sátila (BRA)	93.38	2	97.92	2	93.38	1	96.88	2	1	95.35	0
2nd place, silver medalist(s)	Lois Betteridge (CAN)	97.76	2	100.88	6	97.76	3	105.82	2	2	102.95	0
3rd place, bronze medalist(s)	Michaela Corcoran (USA)	109.77	8	96.75	0	96.75	2	109.88	2	3	107.73	2
4	Ana Fernández (PAR)	108.79	6	105.56	2	105.56	5	115.78	4	4	108.85	0
5	Carolina Rossi (ARG)	107.65	2	103.01	0	103.01	4	118.86	6	5	112.92	2
6	Mariana Torres (VEN)	213.56	62	145.58	6	145.58	6	256.39	110	6	did not advance	
7	Leslie Cuzcano (PER)	441.33	312	590.32	412	441.33	7	did not advance				
	Sasha Azcona (MEX)	did not start										
