= Canoeing at the 2024 Summer Olympics – Women's slalom C-1 =

Women's slalom C-1 at the Games of the XXXIII Olympiad
- Elena Lilik in the C1 final
- Venue: National Olympic Nautical Stadium of Île-de-France, Vaires-sur-Marne
- Dates: 30 July 2024 (heats); 31 July 2024 (semifinal & final)
- Winning time: 101.06

Medalists
1st place, gold medalist(s)		Jessica Fox	Australia
2nd place, silver medalist(s)		Elena Lilik	Germany
3rd place, bronze medalist(s)		Evy Leibfarth	United States

The women's C-1 slalom canoeing event at the 2024 Summer Olympics took place on 30 and 31 July 2024 at the National Olympic Nautical Stadium of Île-de-France in Vaires-sur-Marne.

== Background ==
This was the second appearance of the event after the inaugural edition in 2020.

== Competition format ==
Slalom canoeing uses a three-round format, with heats, semifinal, and final. In the heats, each canoeist has two runs at the course with the better time counting. The top 18 advance to the semifinal. In the semifinal, the canoeists get a single run; the top 10 advance to the final. The best time in the single-run final wins gold.

The canoe course is approximately 250 metres long, with up to 25 gates that the canoeist must pass in the correct direction. Penalty time is added for infractions such as passing on the wrong side or touching a gate. Runs typically last approximately 95 seconds.

== Schedule ==
All times are Central European Summer Time (UTC+2)

The women's slalom C-1 took place over two consecutive days.

Date	Time	Round
30 July 2024	15:00	Heats
31 July 2024	15:30; 17:25	Semifinal; Final

== Results ==
Rank	Bib	Canoeist	Nation	Preliminary Heats						Semifinal			Final		
Rank	Bib	Canoeist	Nation	1st Ride	Pen.	2nd Ride	Pen.	Best	Order	Time	Pen.	Order	Time	Pen.	Order
1st place, gold medalist(s)	1	Jessica Fox	Australia	100.05	0	103.10	2	100.05	2	106.08	0	2	101.06	2	1
2nd place, silver medalist(s)	3	Elena Lilik	Germany	107.95	4	103.29	2	103.29	5	113.59	0	7	103.54	0	2
3rd place, bronze medalist(s)	9	Evy Leibfarth	United States	108.82	0	107.09	6	107.09	11	117.58	0	12	109.95	2	3
4	5	Zuzana Paňková	Slovakia	103.27	0	105.71	0	103.27	4	115.59	2	9	111.07	0	4
5	8	Ana Sátila	Brazil	109.95	2	105.16	0	105.16	7	109.88	2	5	112.70	2	5
6	6	Mònica Dòria	Andorra	101.28	0	151.68	54	101.28	3	106.53	0	3	113.58	6	6
7	2	Gabriela Satková	Czech Republic	99.44	2	106.54	2	99.44	1	105.55	0	1	114.22	2	7
8	15	Alena Marx	Switzerland	109.66	2	111.10	2	109.66	16	117.50	2	11	114.61	2	8
9	13	Eva Alina Hočevar	Slovenia	109.57	2	108.22	2	108.22	12	109.22	0	4	115.48	0	9
10	14	Miren Lazkano	Spain	109.49	2	113.60	8	109.49	15	116.27	4	10	116.97	6	10
11	12	Viktoriia Us	Ukraine	113.67	2	106.09	2	106.09	9	114.26	4	8	117.98	4	11
12	4	Mallory Franklin	Great Britain	104.72	2	152.41	50	104.72	6	111.62	6	6	165.15	56	12
13	7	Marjorie Delassus	France	108.34	4	119.22	10	108.34	13	118.84	6	13	did not advance		
14	17	Viktoria Wolffhardt	Austria	114.27	2	110.39	0	110.39	17	120.78	0	14	did not advance		
15	18	Huang Juan	China	112.88	8	108.47	4	108.47	14	121.64	6	15	did not advance		
16	16	Lena Teunissen	Netherlands	115.51	6	105.33	0	105.33	8	122.82	4	16	did not advance		
17	10	Klaudia Zwolińska	Poland	106.84	2	107.89	4	106.84	10	123.64	6	17	did not advance		
18	11	Marta Bertoncelli	Italy	112.28	4	110.43	4	110.43	18	170.28	50	18	did not advance		
19	20	Lois Betteridge	Canada	120.22	8	115.60	6	115.60	19	did not advance					
20	21	Haruka Okazaki	Japan	122.50	2	130.42	8	122.50	20	did not advance					
21	19	Michaela Corcoran	Ireland	129.55	10	168.08	52	129.55	21	did not advance					
