= Michaela Corcoran =

Irish-American canoeist (born 2002)

Personal information
- Born: August 7, 2002 (age 23) Houston, Texas, U.S.

Sport
- Country: Ireland, United States
- Sport: Canoe slalom
- Event: C1
Medal record
Women's canoe slalom
Representing United States
Pan American Games
Bronze medal – third place	2019 Lima	C1

Michaela Corcoran (born August 7, 2002) is an Irish-American slalom canoeist who has competed at the international level since 2018, specializing in the C1 event. She started her career representing United States, but has been competing for Ireland since 2021. She won the bronze medal in the C1 event at the 2019 Pan American Games for the United States. She competed at the 2024 Olympic Games for Ireland.

== Early life ==
Corcoran was born in the United States and grew up in Maryland, near the Potomac River. She attended Holton-Arms School in Bethesda, Maryland and later studied biochemistry at the University of Miami. She was first in a kayak aged five, and by the age of ten years-old was receiving outside coaching.

== Career ==
She won the bronze medal in the C1 event at the 2019 Pan American Games in Lima, Peru.

From 2021, Corcoran represented Ireland in international competition and had eligibility to race for Ireland at the European Championships/ Olympic Qualifier in May 2021 at the event held in Italy.

She competed at the World Under-23 Championships in Liptovský Mikuláš, Slovakia in July 2024, where she finished 14th overall in the C1 event.

Later that month, she was officially selected to compete for Ireland at the 2024 Olympic Games in Paris, France, where she finished 21st in the C1 event.

== Personal life ==
She has a twin sister, Madison Corcoran, who has competed in canoe slalom in the K1 event. Michaela was born a minute before Madison. Their Dublin-born father Mike Corcoran competed as a slalom canoeist, and represented Ireland at the 1992 and 1996 Olympic Games. He had relocated to the United States in 1990 from Glasnevin and ran a prosthetics business.
