= Madison Corcoran =

Irish canoeist (born 2002)

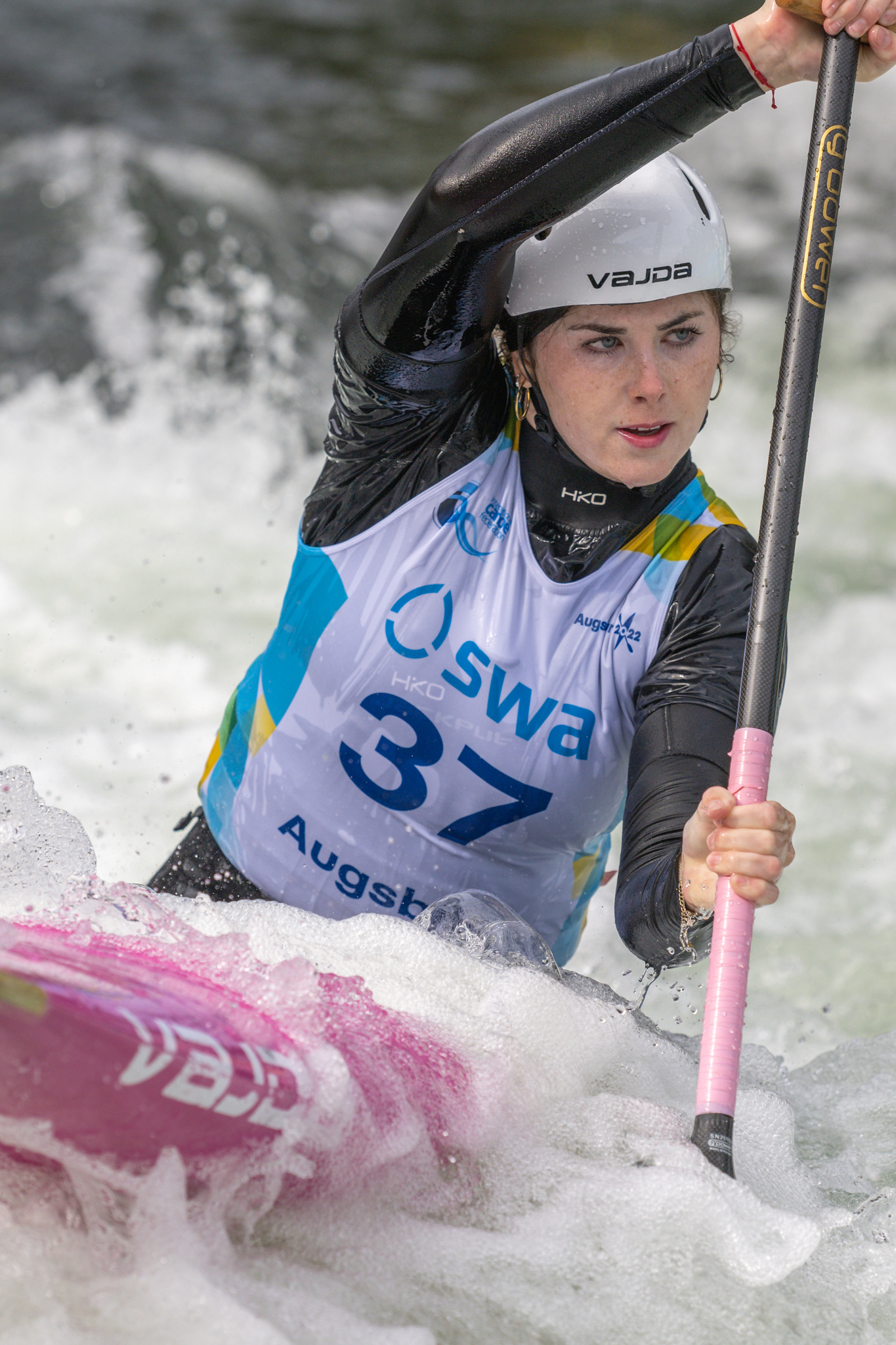
- Madison Corcoran-2022 ICF Canoe Slalom World Championships

Personal information
- Born: August 7, 2002 (age 23) Houston, Texas, U.S.

Sport
- Country: Ireland, United States
- Sport: Canoe slalom
- Event: K1, Kayak-Cross

Madison Corcoran (born August 7, 2002) is an Irish-American slalom canoeist who has competed at the international level since 2018, specializing in the K1 event and kayak cross. She started her career representing United States, but has been competing for Ireland since 2021.

Corcoran competed at the 2024 Olympic Games. She is the daughter of canoeist Mike Corcoran. Her twin sister Michaela Corcoran is also an international canoeist.

== Early life ==
Born in the United States, she grew up in Maryland, and competed for USA as a junior. She studies neuroscience at Vanderbilt University in Nashville, Tennessee.

== Career ==
Having competed collegiately in the United States, from early 2021 she represented Ireland in international competition, receiving clearance to race for Ireland at a European Championships/Olympic Qualifier event in Italy. She made her Ireland debut at the subsequent 2021 European Canoe Slalom Championships. She also competed at the 2022 European Canoe Slalom Championships in Slovenia.

Corcoran competed at the European Games in 2023 Kraków, Poland where her performance gained a qualification place for Ireland at the 2024 Olympic Games.

In July 2024, she was officially selected to compete at the 2024 Paris Olympics. Competing at the Games in the K1 event she did not qualify through to the semifinal from her heat, finishing 24th. She also finished 32nd in kayak cross at the same Games.

== Personal life ==
She was born in the United States and grew up in Maryland, near the Potomac River. She attended Holton-Arms School in Bethesda, Maryland. Her identical twin sister Michaela Corcoran also competes in canoe slalom for Ireland. Their Dublin-born father Mike Corcoran was also a canoe slalomist, and represented Ireland at the 1992 and 1996 Olympic Games. He lived in Glasnevin prior to relocating to the United States in 1990 and running a prosthetics business. Michaela was born a minute before Madison. At the age of five years-old, the two of them were first in a kayak and by the age of ten years-old were receiving outside coaching. She studied psychology at Vanderbilt University.
