= Lois Leaver =

British slalom canoeist (born 2002)

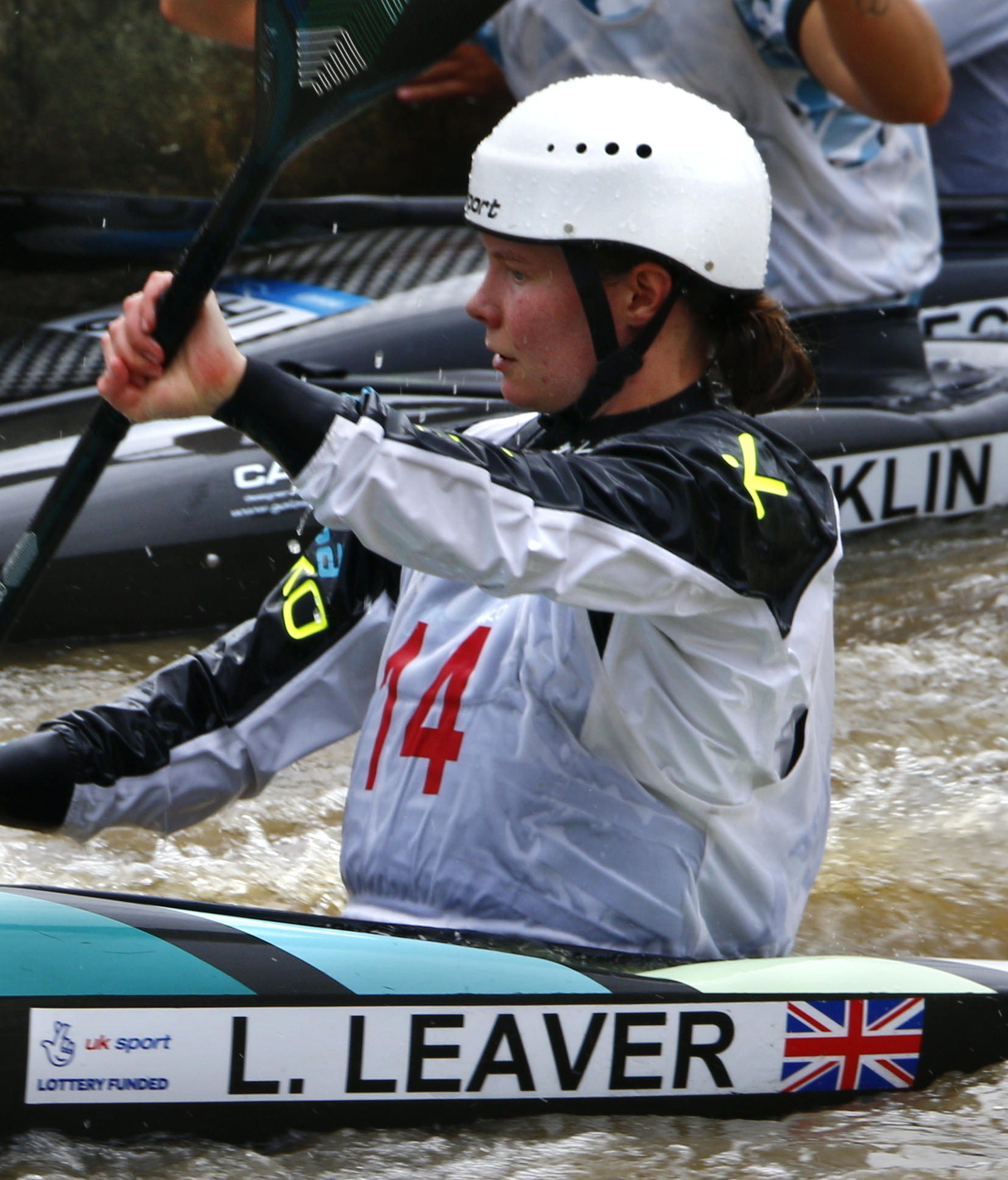
- Leaver in 2024

Personal information
- Nationality: British
- Born: 14 March 2002 (age 24) Edinburgh, Scotland

Sport
- Country: Great Britain
- Sport: Canoe slalom
- Event: K1, Kayak cross
- Coached by: Ciaran Edwards
Medal record
Women's Canoe slalom
Representing Great Britain
World Championships
Bronze medal – third place	2026 Oklahoma City	Kayak cross individual
European Championships
Bronze medal – third place	2025 Vaires-sur-Marne	K1 team
U23 World Championships
Gold medal – first place	2023 Kraków	K1 team
Gold medal – first place	2024 Liptovský Mikuláš	K1
Silver medal – second place	2025 Foix	Kayak cross
Bronze medal – third place	2025 Foix	K1
U23 European Championships
Gold medal – first place	2024 Kraków	Kayak cross individual
Silver medal – second place	2021 Solkan	K1 team
Silver medal – second place	2024 Kraków	Kayak cross
Bronze medal – third place	2022 České Budějovice	K1 team
Junior World Championships
Bronze medal – third place	2019 Kraków	K1 team
Junior European Championships
Bronze medal – third place	2018 Bratislava	K1 team

Lois Leaver (born 14 March 2002) is a British slalom canoeist who has competed at the international level since 2018, specializing in K1 and kayak cross.

== Career ==
In July 2024, Leaver competed at the 2024 U23 Canoe Slalom Championships and won a gold medal in the K1 event. The next month she competed at the 2024 U23 European Canoe Slalom Championships and won a gold medal in the kayak cross individual event. She competed at the 2025 U23 Canoe Slalom Championships and won a silver medal in the kayak cross and a bronze medal in the K1 event.

Leaver was diagnosed with appendicitis in January 2026 and underwent emergency surgery. In July 2026, she competed at the 2026 ICF Canoe Slalom World Championships and won a bronze medal in the kayak cross individual event with a time of 51.17 seconds.

== Personal life ==
Leaver's brother, Sam, is also a slalom canoeist.

== World Cup individual podiums ==
Season	Date	Venue	Position	Event
2025	8 June 2025	La Seu d'Urgell	3rd	Kayak cross
2025	13 June 2025	Pau	3rd	K1
2025	28 June 2025	Prague	3rd	K1
2025	5 September 2025	Augsburg	3rd	K1
2025	7 September 2025	Augsburg	1st	Kayak cross individual
2025	7 September 2025	Augsburg	3rd	Kayak cross
2026	5 September 2026	Vaires-sur-Marne	1st	Kayak cross individual
2026	5 September 2026	Vaires-sur-Marne	3rd	Kayak cross
