= Carole Bouzidi =

Algerian slalom canoeist

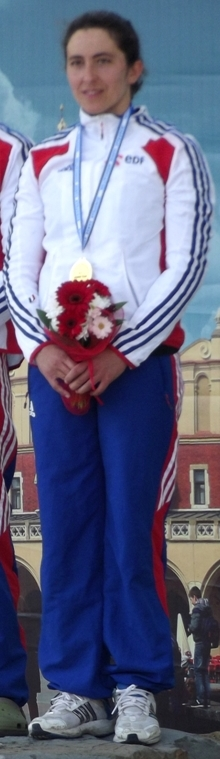
- Bouzidi in 2013

Personal information
- Native name: كارول بوزيدي
- Full name: Carole Diana Bouzidi
- Nationality: French, Algerian
- Born: 25 June 1985 (age 40) Paris, France

Sport
- Country: Algeria
Medal record
Women's canoe slalom
Representing France
World Championships
| Gold medal – first place | 2014 Deep Creek Lake | K1 team |
| Bronze medal – third place | 2015 London | K1 team |
European Championships
| Gold medal – first place | 2012 Augsburg | K1 |
| Gold medal – first place | 2013 Krakow | K1 team |
| Silver medal – second place | 2012 Augsburg | K1 team |
| Bronze medal – third place | 2014 Vienna | K1 team |
| Bronze medal – third place | 2015 Markkleeberg | K1 team |
U23 European Championships
| Silver medal – second place | 2007 Kraków | K1 team |
| Bronze medal – third place | 2005 Kraków | K1 team |
| Bronze medal – third place | 2006 Nottingham | K1 team |
Junior European Championships
| Bronze medal – third place | 2003 Hohenlimburg | K1 team |

Carole Diana Bouzidi (Arabic: كارول ديانا بوزيدي; born 25 June 1985) is a French-Algerian slalom canoeist who has competed at the international level since 2002. Born in France, she has represented Algeria since 2022.

She won two medals in the K1 team event at the ICF Canoe Slalom World Championships with a gold in 2014 and a bronze in 2015. She also won five medals (2 golds, 1 silver and 2 bronzes) at the European Championships.

She represented Algeria at the 2024 Summer Olympics in Paris, France. In the K1 event, she placed 14th in the semifinal and was eliminated, while in the kayak cross, she placed second in both her starting heat and the quarterfinal, progressing to the semifinals and finished 7th overall.

== World Cup individual podiums ==
| Season | Date | Venue | Position | Event |
|---|---|---|---|---|
| 2012 | 17 Jun 2012 | Pau | 2nd | K1 |
| 2012 | 26 Aug 2012 | Prague | 2nd | K1 |

== World Cup team podiums ==
| Season | Date | Venue | Position | Event |
|---|---|---|---|---|
| 2014 | 8 June | Lee Valley | 2nd | K1 team |

== ICF Masters Canoe Slalom World Championships ==
| Season | Date | Venue | Position | Event |
|---|---|---|---|---|
| 2024 | 24 August 2024 | Krakow | 1st | K1 |
| 2024 | 24 August 2024 | Krakow | 1st | C1 |
