= Emma Vuitton =

French canoeist (born 2003)

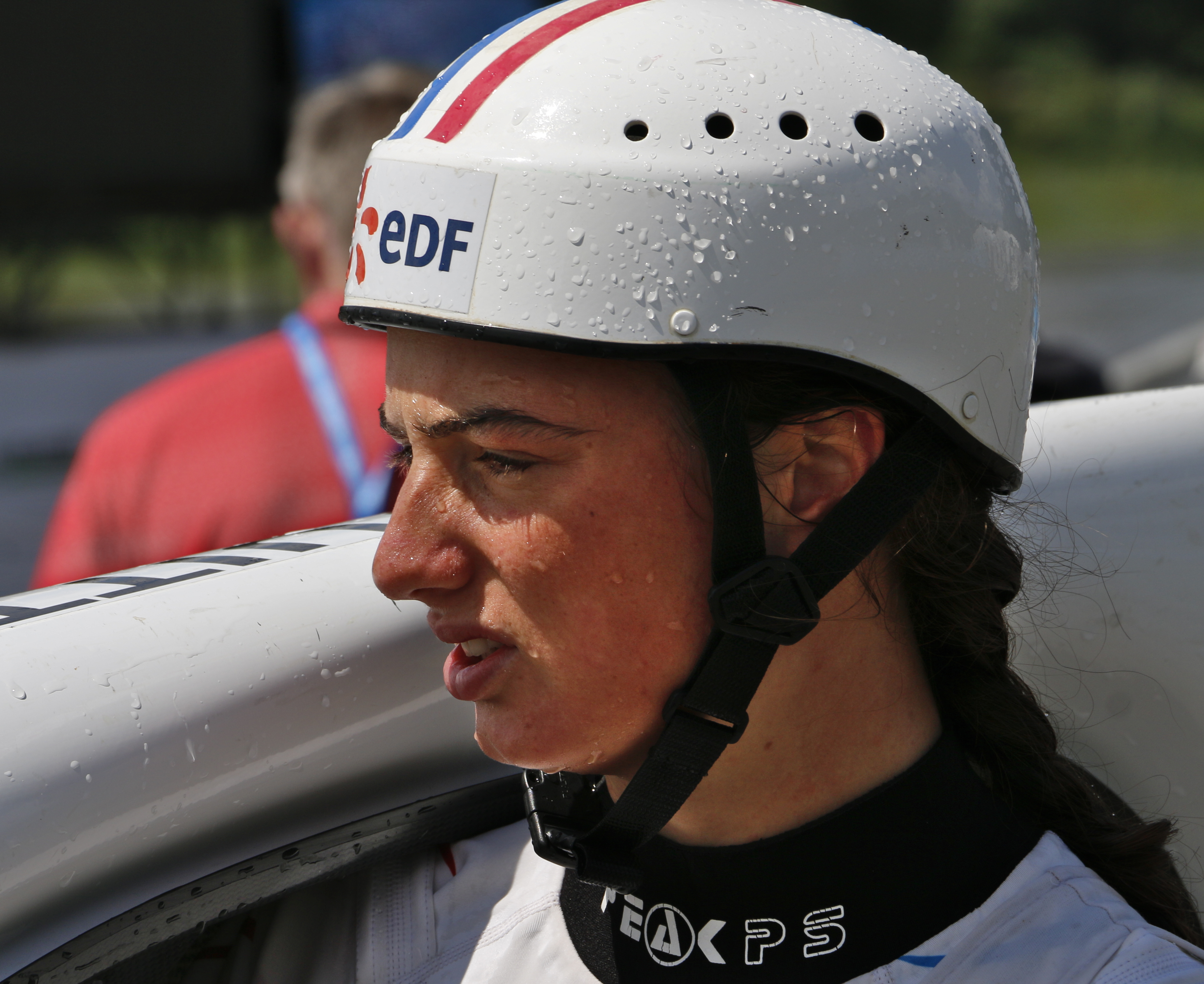
- Vuitton in 2024

Personal information
- Nationality: French
- Born: 15 October 2003 (age 22)

Sport
- Country: France
- Sport: Canoe slalom
- Event: K1, Kayak cross
Medal record
Women's Canoe slalom
Representing France
Event	1st	2nd	3rd
World Championships	0	1	0
European Games	1	0	0
European Championships	1	2	1
U23 World Championships	1	3	1
U23 European Championships	2	2	1
Junior World Championships	1	1	0
Junior European Championships	0	3	1
Total	6	12	4
World Championships
Silver medal – second place	2026 Oklahoma City	K1 team
European Games
Gold medal – first place	2023 Kraków	K1 team
European Championships
Gold medal – first place	2022 Liptovský Mikuláš	K1 team
Silver medal – second place	2024 Tacen	K1 team
Silver medal – second place	2025 Vaires-sur-Marne	Kayak cross
Bronze medal – third place	2026 Ivrea	K1 team
U23 World Championships
Gold medal – first place	2024 Liptovský Mikuláš	Kayak cross
Silver medal – second place	2022 Ivrea	K1
Silver medal – second place	2024 Liptovský Mikuláš	K1 team
Silver medal – second place	2025 Foix	K1 team
Bronze medal – third place	2022 Ivrea	K1 team
U23 European Championships
Gold medal – first place	2024 Kraków	K1 team
Gold medal – first place	2026 Épinal	K1 team
Silver medal – second place	2022 České Budějovice	K1 team
Silver medal – second place	2026 Épinal	K1
Bronze medal – third place	2024 Kraków	Kayak cross individual
Junior World Championships
Gold medal – first place	2019 Kraków	K1 team
Silver medal – second place	2021 Tacen	K1
Junior European Championships
Silver medal – second place	2019 Liptovský Mikuláš	K1 team
Silver medal – second place	2020 Kraków	K1
Silver medal – second place	2021 Solkan	K1 team
Bronze medal – third place	2021 Solkan	K1

Emma Vuitton (born 15 October 2003) is a French slalom canoeist who has competed at the international level since 2018, specializing in K1 and kayak cross.

== Career ==
Vuitton represented France at the 2022 European Canoe Slalom Championships and won a gold medal in the K1 team event. She then competed at the 2023 European Games and won a gold medal in the K1 team event, along with Camille Prigent and Marjorie Delassus.

During the 2024 Canoe Slalom World Cup, on 7 June 2024, she won her first career World Cup gold medal, defeating four-time time Olympic medalist, Jessica Fox, and reigning Olympic champion, Ricarda Funk. In July 2024, she competed at the 2024 U23 World Championships and won a gold medal in the kayak cross event. The next month she competed at the 2024 U23 European Championships and won a gold medal in the K1 team event.

She represented France at the 2026 ICF Canoe Slalom World Championships and won a silver medal in the K1 team event.

== World Cup individual podiums ==
Season	Date	Venue	Position	Event
2024	7 June 2024	Prague	1st	K1
