= Li Shiting =

Chinese slalom canoeist (born 2005)

Personal information
- Born: November 25, 2005 (age 20)

Sport
- Country: China
- Sport: Canoe slalom
- Event: K1, Kayak cross

Li Shiting (born 25 November 2005) is a Chinese slalom canoeist who has competed at the international level since 2024, specializing in K1 and kayak cross.

She represented China at the 2024 Summer Olympics in Paris.

== Career ==
Li Shiting competed at the 2024 World Junior and U23 Canoe Slalom Championships in July 2024, in Liptovský Mikuláš, Slovakia.

At the age of 18 years-old, she was the youngest competitor in the canoeing events at the 2024 Paris Olympics, male or female. She finished 16th in the K1 event and 34th in kayak cross.
