= Lois Betteridge (canoeist) =

Canadian canoeist (born 1997)

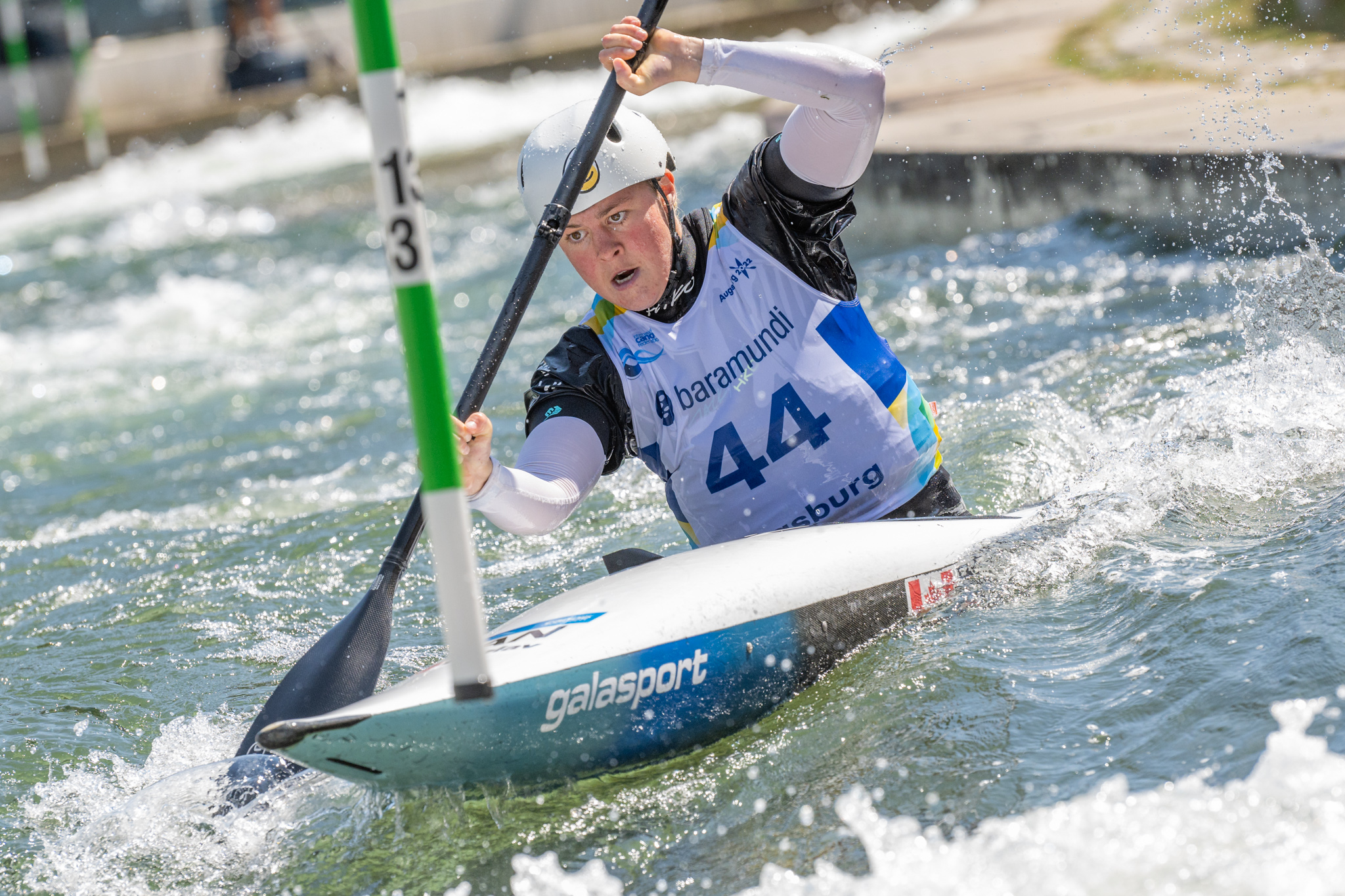
- Lois Betteridge performing at 2022 ICF Canoe Slalom World Championships in Augsburg, Germany

Personal information
- Born: December 17, 1997 (age 28) Ottawa, Ontario, Canada

Sport
- Country: Canada
- Sport: Canoe slalom
- Event: C1, K1, kayak cross
Medal record
Women's canoe slalom
Representing Canada
Pan American Games
Silver medal – second place	2023 Santiago	C1
Silver medal – second place	2023 Santiago	Kayak cross
Silver medal – second place	2019 Lima	C1

Lois Betteridge (born December 17, 1997) is a Canadian slalom canoeist who has competed at the international level since 2015 in C1, K1 and kayak cross. She is a three-time silver medallist at the Pan American Games and she participated at the 2024 Summer Olympics.

== Career ==
She won a silver medal in the C1 event at the 2019 Pan American Games in Lima, Peru.

In June 2023, Betteridge was named to her second Pan American Games team. She won two silver medals at the 2023 Pan American Games in Santiago, Chile (C1 and kayak cross).

In May 2024, Betteridge was named to Canada's 2024 Olympic team. She competed in three events at the 2024 Paris Olympics, finishing 19th in the C1 event, 20th in the K1 event and 24th in kayak cross.

Betteridge and Yannick Laviolette finished in 6th place in the overall standings of the 2018 Canoe Slalom World Cup in the C2 mixed event.
