= Alena Marx =

Swiss slalom canoeist (born 2000)

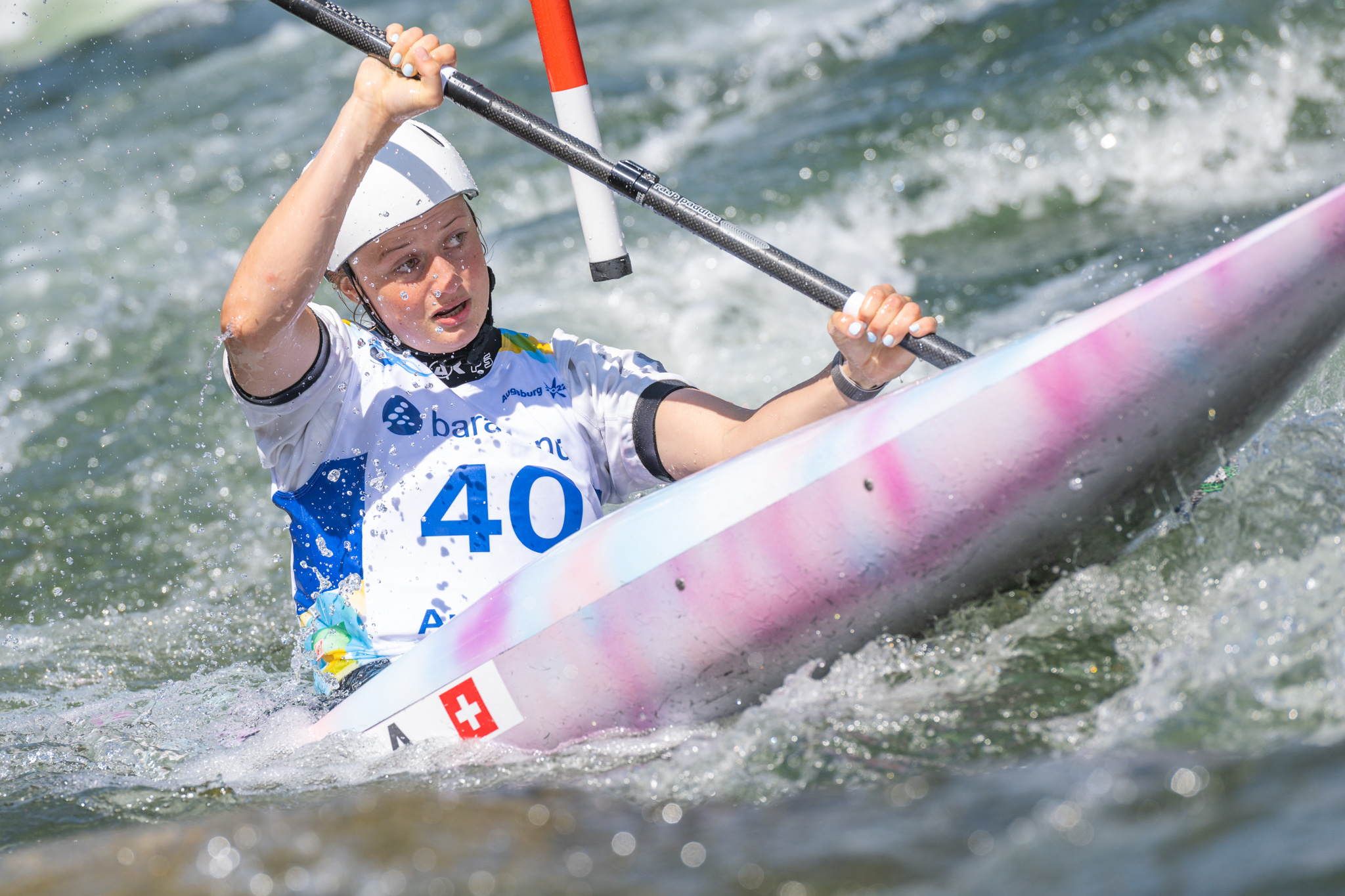
- Alena Marx performing at 2022 ICF Canoe Slalom World Championships in Augsburg, Germany

Personal information
- Nationality: Swiss
- Born: 21 December 2000 (age 25)

Sport
- Country: Switzerland
- Sport: Canoe slalom
- Event: C1, K1, Kayak cross
Medal record
Women's canoe slalom
Representing Switzerland
World Championships
Gold medal – first place	2025 Penrith	Kayak cross individual
Gold medal – first place	2026 Oklahoma City	Kayak cross
European Championships
Gold medal – first place	2024 Tacen	Kayak cross
Gold medal – first place	2024 Tacen	Kayak cross individual
U23 World Championships
Bronze medal – third place	2023 Kraków	Kayak cross

Alena Marx (born 21 December 2000) is a Swiss slalom canoeist who has competed at the international level since 2016.

== Career ==
Marx won two gold medals at the ICF Canoe Slalom World Championships. She won the inaugural edition of kayak cross individual at the 2025 World Championships in Penrith. She also won gold in kayak cross at the 2026 World Championships in Oklahoma City.

Marx represented Switzerland at two Olympic Games. She finised in 16th place in the C1 event at the delayed 2020 Summer Olympics in Tokyo after being eliminated in the semifinal. She also competed at the 2024 Summer Olympics in Paris, finishing 8th in the C1 event, 19th in the K1 event and 6th in kayak cross.

She won two gold medals at the 2024 European Championships in Tacen.

=== World Cup individual podiums ===
Season	Date	Venue	Position	Event
2026	30 May 2026	Tacen	3rd	C1
2026	31 May 2026	Tacen	1st	Kayak cross
2026	14 June 2026	Augsburg	3rd	Kayak cross

== Personal life ==
Her brother Dimitri Marx also competes in canoe slalom and is a two-time U23 world champion in kayak cross.
