= Lena Teunissen =

Dutch canoeist

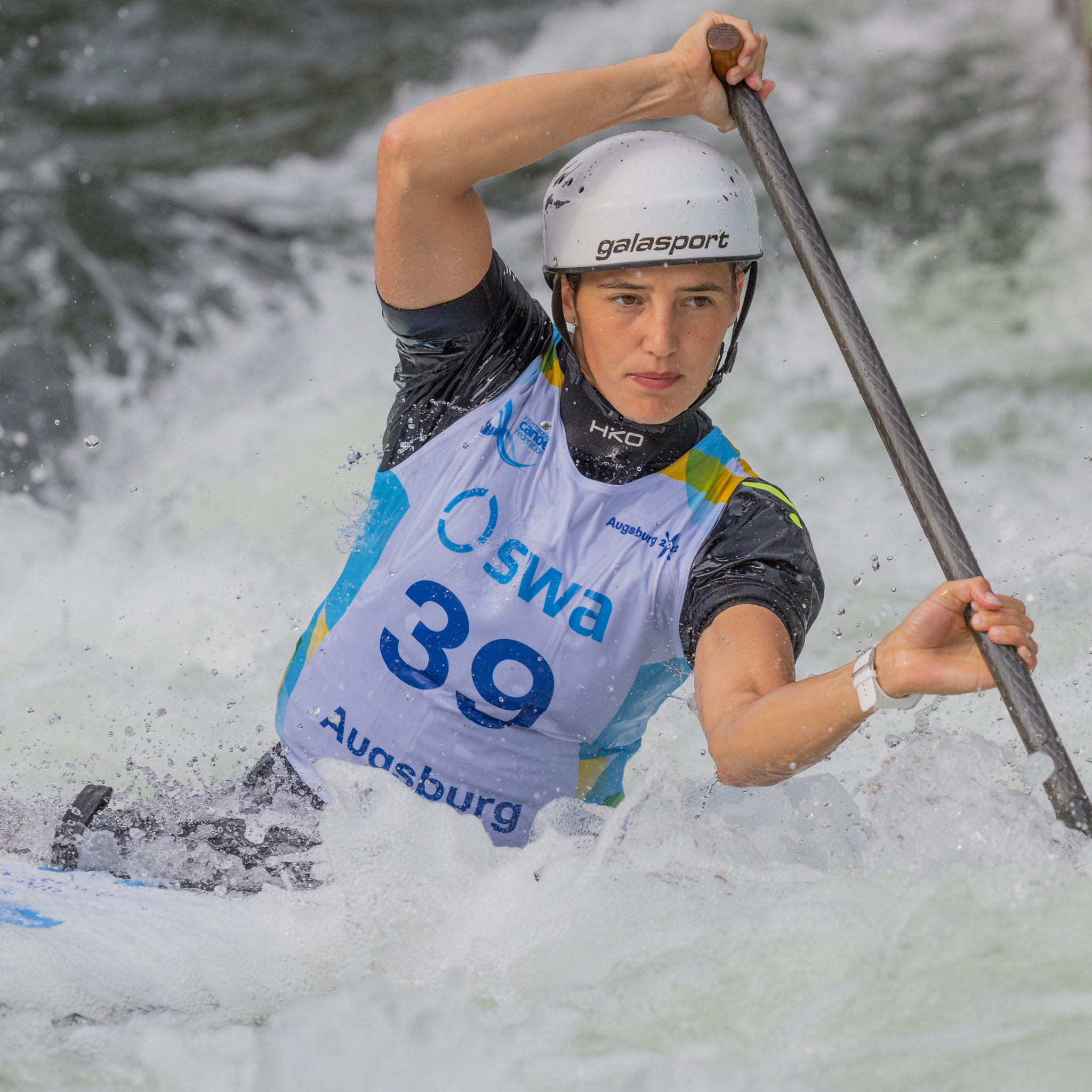
- Teunissen in 2022

Personal information
- Born: 17 August 1997 (age 28) Netherlands

Sport
- Sport: Canoe slalom
- Event: C1, K1, kayak cross
Medal record
Women's canoe slalom
Representing Netherlands
European U23 Championships
Gold medal – first place	2017 Hohenlimburg	K1 team

Lena Teunissen (born 17 August 1997) is a Dutch slalom canoeist who has competed at the international level since 2012.

She competed at the 2024 Summer Olympics where she finished 16th in the C1 event and 19th in kayak cross.

Teunissen is from Leerdam and moved to Eindhoven after high school.
