= Viktoriia Us =

Ukrainian slalom canoeist

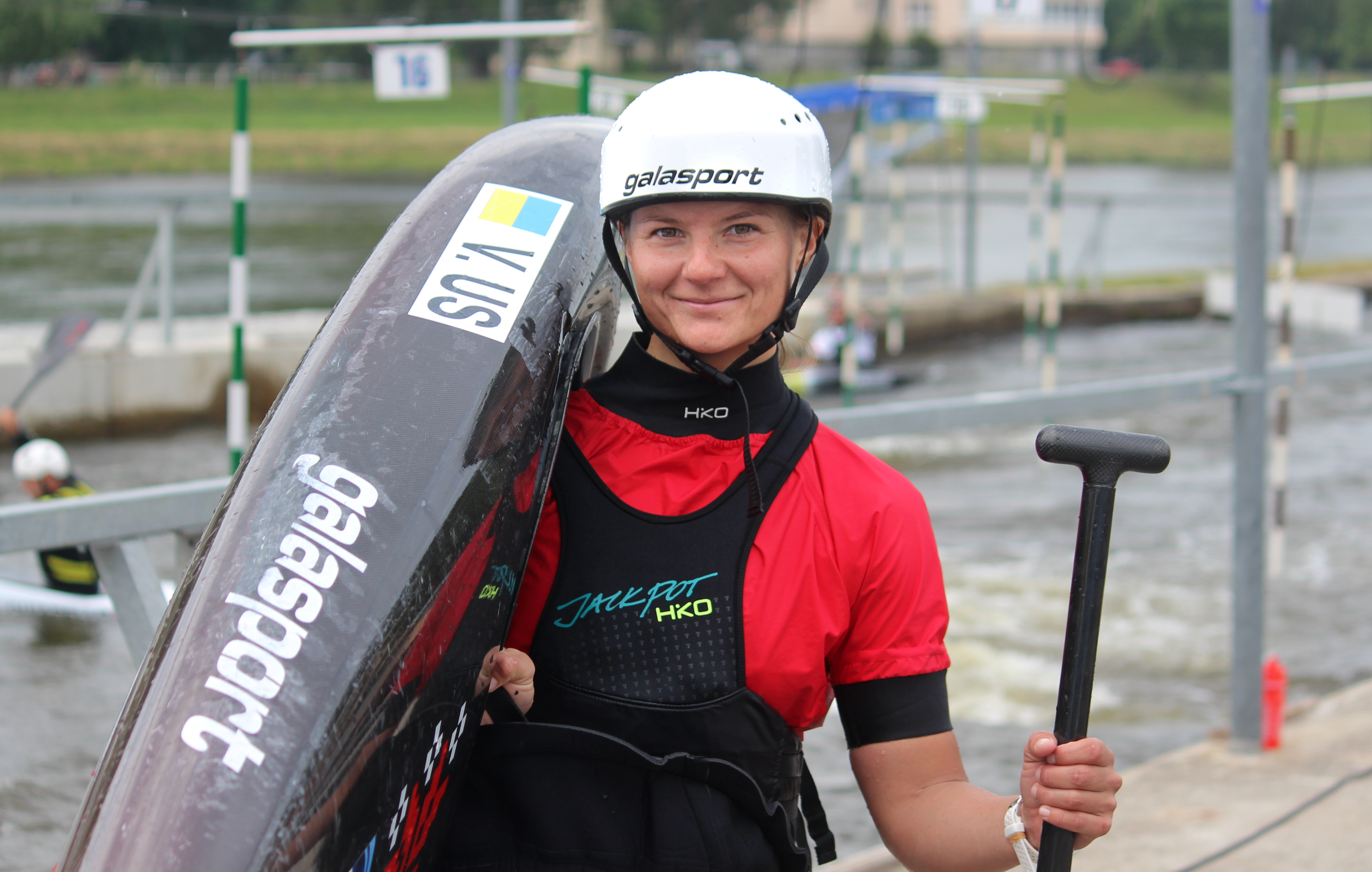
- Viktoriia Us (2023)

Personal information
- Born: Viktoriia Volodymyrivna Us; 29 April 1993 (age 33) Kyiv, Ukraine

Sport
- Event: C1, K1, Kayak cross
Medal record
Women's canoe slalom
Representing Ukraine
European Games
Gold medal – first place	2023 Kraków	Kayak cross
U23 World Championships
Silver medal – second place	2013 Liptovský Mikuláš	C1
U23 European Championships
Bronze medal – third place	2015 Kraków	K1

Viktoriia Volodymyrivna Us (Ukrainian: Вікторія Володимирівна Ус; born 29 April 1993) is a Ukrainian slalom canoeist who has competed at the international level since 2008.

== Career ==
Us won a gold medal in kayak cross at the 2023 European Games in Kraków.

She is a three time Olympian. She finished in 12th place in the K1 event at the 2016 Summer Olympics in Rio de Janeiro. She recorded her 2nd Olympic participation at the 2020 Summer Olympics in Tokyo where she started in both women's events. She finished 8th in the K1 event and 7th in the C1 event. She also competed at the 2024 Summer Olympics in Paris, finishing 11th in the C1 event, 18th in the K1 event and 11th in kayak cross.

She won silver in the C1 event at the 2013 World U23 Championships in Liptovský Mikuláš and a bronze in the K1 event at the 2015 European U23 Championships in Kraków.

== World Cup individual podiums ==
	1st place, gold medalist(s)	2nd place, silver medalist(s)	3rd place, bronze medalist(s)	Total
C1	0	3	1	4
K1	0	1	3	4
Kayak cross	0	1	1	2
Total	0	5	5	10

Season	Date	Venue	Position	Event
2019	29 June 2019	Tacen	3rd	K1
2020	7 November 2020	Pau	3rd	K1
2020	8 November 2020	Pau	2nd	C1
2022	19 June 2022	Kraków	3rd	Kayak cross
2022	25 June 2022	Tacen	3rd	K1
2023	16 June 2023	Tacen	2nd	C1
2023	17 June 2023	Tacen	2nd	K1
2024	14 September 2024	Ivrea	3rd	C1
2025	30 August 2025	Tacen	2nd	C1
2026	31 May 2026	Tacen	2nd	Kayak cross
