= 2021 ICF Canoe Slalom World Championships – Women's extreme slalom =

World championship canoeing event

Women's extreme slalom at the 2021 ICF Canoe Slalom World Championships
- Venue: Čunovo Water Sports Centre
- Location: Bratislava, Slovakia
- Dates: 24–26 September 2021
- Competitors: 55 from 24 nations

Medalists
gold medal	Jessica Fox	Australia
silver medal	Elena Apel	Germany
bronze medal	Evy Leibfarth	United States

The women's extreme slalom at the 2021 ICF Canoe Slalom World Championships took place on 24 and 26 September 2021 at the Čunovo Water Sports Centre in Bratislava. It was the 4th edition of the event, after it made its debut in 2017 in Pau. 55 athletes from 24 nations competed.

The event was won by Jessica Fox of Australia, her 8th individual title in a third unique event. German Elena Apel won silver securing a third medal of the Championships along with her C1 world title and K1 silver, whilst 17 year old Evy Leibfarth won bronze, making her the youngest ever medallist in this event and securing USA's first canoe slalom medal since Michal Smolen won bronze in men's K1 in 2015.

== Background ==
Reigning world champion Veronika Vojtová of the Czech Republic, who took the title in 2019 in Prague, did not compete after missing out on domestic selection. Brazil's Ana Sátila entered as the World No. 1, having won the title in 2018, whilst the 2021 World Cup overall winner and inaugural champion Caroline Trompeter also entered as a favourite.

Participation in the event was the largest in history, leading into the events Olympic debut in 2024.

== Competition format ==
The women's extreme slalom event in canoe slalom is split into two phases - time trials and knockout-style heats. On the Friday, all athletes complete a timed run of the course alone and are seeded based on their performance, with those awarded faults ranked last. 32 athletes progress to the heats, with the advancing paddlers selected first by National Federation, and then time. That is, if there are 32 or more competing federations, only the fastest athlete from each of the 32 fastest federations will advance. If there are less than 32 federations competing, the second fastest athletes from each federation will advance and so on until 32 positions are filled. A federation can enter a maximum of four boats in the time trials.

On Sunday, the advancing athletes are split into 8 heats of 4, arranged in an order specified by the rulebook (page 74). The heats and subsequent rounds involve head-to-head racing of 4 boats on the course, where paddlers must navigate 2 upstream gates, a series of downstream gates and perform a complete eskimo roll. The athletes select their positions in the start ramp, with preference given in the order which they were seeded by the time trials. The highest two ranked athletes in each heat progress to the quarter-finals, then to the semifinal and final. Whichever athlete is ranked first in the final is awarded gold. Athletes can be penalised in three ways in each round, by receiving a fault (FLT), being a ranked last finisher (RLF), or by not finishing (DNF). Faults are incurred for false starts, missing gates or failing to correctly perform a 360-degree roll. Athletes are ranked last (RLF) if they breach the safety requirements of the competition, such as by holding back another athlete with their hands or paddle, deliberately paddling over another athlete's boat, or by making dangerous contact with another athlete's head or body - all other non-dangerous contact is allowed. In each round athletes are ranked first by the order in which they cross the finish line, with those incurring penalties ranked in the following order: FLT, RLF, DNF, DNS.

The final classification of athletes is determined in the following manner: Athletes eliminated at any phase of the competition will be given their rank based on the comparison of the time trial times of athletes eliminated at the same phase. All 3rd ranked athletes will be ranked above all 4th ranked athletes. The final rank of athletes who did not progress to the heats is determined by their time trial results.

== Schedule ==
All times are Central European Summer Time (UTC+2)

Date	Time	Round
Friday, 24 September 2021
Friday, 24 September 2021	13:55	Time Trials
Sunday, 26 September 2021
Sunday, 26 September 2021	15:30	Heats
Sunday, 26 September 2021	16:33	Quarterfinal
Sunday, 26 September 2021	17:09	Semifinals
Sunday, 26 September 2021	17:29	Final

== Results ==
=== Time Trials ===
Ricarda Funk of Germany was fastest in the time trials with a time of 57.33 ahead of Australian Jess Fox. With 23 National Federations starting, 9 federations were permitted 2 starters in the heats, and none were permitted 3. 2021 World Cup overall winner Caroline Trompeter did not progress to the heats. The fastest non-qualifiers were Fiona Pennie of Great Britain (10th) and Lucia Simonidesová of Slovakia (19th). The top ten in the time trials were as follows:

Rank	Bib	Canoeist	Nation	Time
1	29	Ricarda Funk	Germany	57.33
2	4	Jessica Fox	Australia	57.45
3	6	Luuka Jones	New Zealand	58.47
4	24	Kimberley Woods	Great Britain	58.96
5	36	Eliška Mintálová	Slovakia	59.03
6	38	Elena Apel	Germany	59.23
7	7	Miren Lazkano	Spain	59.50
8	51	Corinna Kuhnle	Austria	59.55
9	32	Mallory Franklin	Great Britain	59.63
10	15	Fiona Pennie	Great Britain	59.89

=== Knockout rounds ===
Top Half

Heats
1; 17	(Germany) Ricarda Funk (Netherlands) Martina Wegman	1; 2
16; 32	(Spain) Olatz Arregui (Finland) Iisa Maenpaa	3; 4
24; 25	(United States) Evy Leibfarth (Switzerland) Naemi Brändle	1; 2
8; 9	(Austria) Corinna Kuhnle (United Kingdom) Mallory Franklin	FLT; FLT
12; 21	(France) Camille Prigent; P. Mukhgaleeva	1; 2
28; 5	(Italy) Chiara Sabattini (Slovakia) Eliška Mintálová	3 RLF
4; 13	(United Kingdom) Kimberley Woods (Czech Republic) Kateřina Minařík	1; 2
20; 29	(Slovenia) Ajda Novak (Poland) Aleksandra Stach	3; 4

Quarterfinals
24; 25	(United States) Evy Leibfarth (Switzerland) Naemi Brändle	1; 2
17; 1	(Netherlands) Martina Wegman (Germany) Ricarda Funk	3 FLT
13; 12	(Czech Republic) Kateřina Minařík (France) Camille Prigent	1; 2
4; 21	(United Kingdom) Kimberley Woods; P. Mukhgaleeva	3; 4

Semifinal
24; 25	(United States) Evy Leibfarth (Switzerland) Naemi Brändle	1; 2
12; 13	(France) Camille Prigent (Czech Republic) Kateřina Minařík	3 RLF

Bottom Half

Heats
3; 19	(New Zealand) Luuka Jones (Czech Republic) Antonie Galušková	1; 2
14; 30	(Slovakia) Soňa Stanovská (Chile) F. Aguirre Gonzalez	FLT; FLT
11; 6	(Brazil) Ana Sátila (Germany) Elena Apel	1; 2
27; 22	(Sweden) Monika Mitasikova (Ukraine) Viktoriia Us	3; 4
10; 7	(France) Marjorie Delassus (Spain) Miren Lazkano	1; 2
26; 23	(Canada) Lois Betteridge; Alsu Minazova	3; 4
2; 15	(Australia) Jessica Fox (Australia) Noemie Fox	1; 2
18; 31	(New Zealand) Hannah Thomas (Greece) Georgia Morou	3 DNF

Quarterfinals
6; 3	(Germany) Elena Apel (New Zealand) Luuka Jones	1; 2
11; 19	(Brazil) Ana Sátila (Czech Republic) Antonie Galušková	FLT; FLT
2; 15	(Australia) Jessica Fox (Australia) Noemie Fox	1; 2
7; 10	(Spain) Miren Lazkano (France) Marjorie Delassus	3; 4

Semifinal
6; 2	(Germany) Elena Apel (Australia) Jessica Fox	1; 2
15; 3	(Australia) Noemie Fox (New Zealand) Luuka Jones	3; 4

=== Final ===
Apel lead into the first set of upstreams but relinquished the lead to Fox when they opted for different gates. Both chose the upstream on the left side of the course in the second set, but Apel was unable to undercut Fox. Jessica Fox won gold to 'resurrect' a weekend that say her miss out on the K1 and C1 finals at the World Championships for the first time in her entire career. Despite a late challenge from Leibfarth, Elena Apel held on to win silver in what was her third medal in as many events. 17 year old Evy Leibfarth's bronze medal made her the youngest ever medallist in this event. Naemi Brändle of Switzerland finished 4th in a career-best result. All completed penalty free runs.

2	(Australia) Jessica Fox	1st place, gold medalist(s)
6	(Germany) Elena Apel	2nd place, silver medalist(s)
24	(United States) Evy Leibfarth	3rd place, bronze medalist(s)
25	(Switzerland) Naemi Brändle	4
