= 2023 ICF Canoe Slalom World Championships – Women's C1 =

Women's canoe at the 2023 ICF Canoe Slalom World Championships
- Venue: Lee Valley White Water Centre
- Location: London, United Kingdom
- Dates: 20–22 September 2023
- Competitors: 53 from 27 nations

Medalists
| gold medal | Mallory Franklin | Great Britain |
| silver medal | Kimberley Woods | Great Britain |
| bronze medal | Jessica Fox | Australia |

The women's canoe event at the 2023 ICF Canoe Slalom World Championships took place on 22 September 2023 at the Lee Valley White Water Centre in London, with the qualification heats on 20 September 2023.

== Competition format ==
The event uses a three-round format with qualification heats, semifinal and final. Paddlers complete up to two runs in the heats, with the top ranked athletes starting last. In the first heat, the 20 fastest paddlers qualify automatically for the semifinal, whilst the rest compete in the second heat for additional 10 qualification spots. The final rank of non-qualifying athletes is determined by their second run score. Paddlers start in the reverse order of their heats position in the semifinal and complete a single run, with the top 10 advancing to the final. The start list for the final is once again in reverse order of the semifinal results. The athlete with the best time in the single-run final is awarded gold.

A penalty of 2 seconds is awarded for touching a gate and a 50-second penalty is awarded for missing a gate or negotiating it in the opposite direction.

The heats setup had 23 gates including 6 upstream gates (3-11-12-15-19-23). The semifinal and final gate setup also had 23 gates with 6 upstream gates (3-11-12-15-19-23), but in a more difficult configuration, causing slower times.

== Schedule ==
All times listed are UTC+1.

| Date | Time | Round |
|---|---|---|
20 September 2023
| 20 September 2023 | 10:30 | Heats Run 1 |
| 20 September 2023 | 14:00 | Heats Run 2 |
22 September 2023
| 22 September 2023 | 10:03 | Semifinal |
| 22 September 2023 | 13:35 | Final |

== Results ==
Mallory Franklin won her second individual gold in the C1 event at the World Championships with a clean in the final, edging out her teammate Kimberley Woods who won her first career individual medal in C1. Australian Jessica Fox took bronze, which was her eighth medal in this discipline.

There were 12 quota spots available for the 2024 Summer Olympics, one per country. The quota spots were secured by:

- Great Britain
- Australia
- Germany
- Brazil
- Andorra
- United States
- Slovakia
- Czech Republic
- France
- Spain
- Italy
- Ukraine

Penalties are included in the time shown. The fastest time in each round is shown in bold.

| Rank | Bib | Athlete | Country | Heats | | | | | | Semifinal | | | Final | | |
| Rank | Bib | Athlete | Country | Run 1 | | | Run 2 | | | Semifinal | | | Final | | |
| Rank | Bib | Athlete | Country | Time | Pen | Rank | Time | Pen | Rank | Time | Pen | Rank | Time | Pen | Rank |
|---|---|---|---|---|---|---|---|---|---|---|---|---|---|---|---|
| 1st place, gold medalist(s) | 4 | Mallory Franklin | Great Britain | 96.10 | 0 | 2 | - | | | 113.95 | 0 | 7 | **108.05** | 0 | 1 |
| 2nd place, silver medalist(s) | 7 | Kimberley Woods | Great Britain | 96.72 | 0 | 4 | - | | | 113.34 | 2 | 4 | 108.47 | 0 | 2 |
| 3rd place, bronze medalist(s) | 1 | Jessica Fox | Australia | 108.25 | 4 | 33 | 96.76 | 0 | 2 | 112.78 | 0 | 3 | 108.94 | 2 | 3 |
| 4 | 2 | Elena Lilik | Germany | 151.12 | 54 | 48 | 99.39 | 4 | 5 | 113.50 | 0 | 6 | 113.77 | 2 | 4 |
| 5 | 14 | Ana Sátila | Brazil | 96.43 | 0 | 3 | - | | | 115.92 | 0 | 10 | 115.77 | 2 | 5 |
| 6 | 9 | Mònica Dòria Vilarrubla | Andorra | 98.90 | 2 | 7 | - | | | **111.01** | 2 | 1 | 116.79 | 0 | 6 |
| 7 | 12 | Evy Leibfarth | United States | 99.29 | 2 | 10 | - | | | 112.18 | 0 | 2 | 117.95 | 2 | 7 |
| 8 | 10 | Zuzana Paňková | Slovakia | 102.85 | 4 | 19 | - | | | 114.07 | 0 | 8 | 119.07 | 6 | 8 |
| 9 | 5 | Gabriela Satková | Czech Republic | 99.11 | 2 | 8 | - | | | 113.36 | 0 | 5 | 165.64 | 54 | 9 |
| 10 | 8 | Marjorie Delassus | France | 100.00 | 6 | 12 | - | | | 114.60 | 0 | 9 | 215.00 | 102 | 10 |
| 11 | 20 | Klara Olazabal | Spain | 99.12 | 2 | 9 | - | | | 116.80 | 2 | 11 | did not advance | | |
| 12 | 15 | Marta Bertoncelli | Italy | 102.44 | 2 | 16 | - | | | 116.85 | 0 | 12 | did not advance | | |
| 13 | 11 | Viktoriia Us | Ukraine | 98.49 | 0 | 5 | - | | | 117.58 | 0 | 13 | did not advance | | |
| 14 | 27 | Lucie Prioux | France | 104.51 | 2 | 26 | 98.25 | 0 | 4 | 119.23 | 2 | 14 | did not advance | | |
| 15 | 24 | Emanuela Luknárová | Slovakia | 102.66 | 4 | 18 | - | | | 121.00 | 4 | 15 | did not advance | | |
| 16 | 35 | Núria Vilarrubla | Spain | 104.25 | 6 | 24 | 103.38 | 2 | 10 | 121.30 | 2 | 16 | did not advance | | |
| 17 | 6 | Tereza Fišerová | Czech Republic | 109.76 | 0 | 36 | 99.70 | 0 | 6 | 121.86 | 8 | 17 | did not advance | | |
| 18 | 23 | Soňa Stanovská | Slovakia | 104.56 | 8 | 28 | 101.08 | 2 | 7 | 121.94 | 6 | 18 | did not advance | | |
| 19 | 19 | Miren Lazkano | Spain | 98.51 | 2 | 6 | - | | | 122.15 | 4 | 19 | did not advance | | |
| 20 | 22 | Alja Kozorog | Slovenia | 109.49 | 4 | 35 | 98.17 | 0 | 3 | 122.19 | 4 | 20 | did not advance | | |
| 21 | 18 | Elena Borghi | Italy | 103.63 | 4 | 21 | **96.33** | 0 | 1 | 122.44 | 4 | 21 | did not advance | | |
| 22 | 25 | Lea Novak | Slovenia | 103.21 | 2 | 20 | - | | | 123.13 | 6 | 22 | did not advance | | |
| 23 | 13 | Klaudia Zwolińska | Poland | 103.72 | 2 | 22 | 101.24 | 2 | 8 | 123.19 | 6 | 23 | did not advance | | |
| 24 | 33 | Nele Bayn | Germany | 100.85 | 2 | 13 | - | | | 123.89 | 4 | 24 | did not advance | | |
| 25 | 36 | Lena Teunissen | Netherlands | 99.36 | 2 | 11 | - | | | 132.09 | 8 | 25 | did not advance | | |
| 26 | 26 | Aleksandra Stach | Poland | 102.16 | 6 | 15 | - | | | 136.36 | 14 | 26 | did not advance | | |
| 27 | 50 | Huang Juan | China | 104.55 | 0 | 27 | 103.27 | 4 | 9 | 141.00 | 4 | 27 | did not advance | | |
| 28 | 3 | Andrea Herzog | Germany | **95.11** | 0 | 1 | - | | | 165.14 | 52 | 28 | did not advance | | |
| 29 | 16 | Angèle Hug | France | 101.28 | 2 | 14 | - | | | 171.91 | 54 | 29 | did not advance | | |
| 30 | 21 | Tereza Kneblová | Czech Republic | 102.63 | 4 | 17 | - | | | 197.57 | 60 | 30 | did not advance | | |
| 31 | 17 | Eva Alina Hočevar | Slovenia | 104.13 | 2 | 23 | 103.68 | 4 | 11 | did not advance | | | | | |
| 32 | 29 | Viktoria Wolffhardt | Austria | 116.62 | 2 | 42 | 103.86 | 0 | 12 | did not advance | | | | | |
| 33 | 39 | Omira Estácia Neta | Brazil | 104.38 | 0 | 25 | 104.63 | 2 | 13 | did not advance | | | | | |
| 34 | 40 | Hannah Thomas | New Zealand | 161.64 | 52 | 50 | 104.79 | 2 | 14 | did not advance | | | | | |
| 35 | 31 | Kate Eckhardt | Australia | 112.60 | 8 | 40 | 105.29 | 0 | 15 | did not advance | | | | | |
| 36 | 30 | Viktoriia Dobrotvorska | Ukraine | 104.56 | 2 | 28 | 105.34 | 2 | 16 | did not advance | | | | | |
| 37 | 51 | Yang Jie | China | 111.44 | 4 | 38 | 105.67 | 2 | 17 | did not advance | | | | | |
| 38 | 34 | Ellis Miller | Great Britain | 106.37 | 2 | 31 | 105.80 | 4 | 18 | did not advance | | | | | |
| 39 | 38 | Laura Pellicer Chica | Andorra | 110.97 | 8 | 37 | 105.90 | 2 | 19 | did not advance | | | | | |
| 40 | 45 | Haruka Okazaki | Japan | 170.16 | 56 | 52 | 110.95 | 0 | 20 | did not advance | | | | | |
| 41 | 46 | Yu Cuishan | China | 114.83 | 0 | 41 | 111.36 | 2 | 21 | did not advance | | | | | |
| 42 | 44 | Marcella Altman | United States | 131.68 | 10 | 46 | 114.39 | 4 | 22 | did not advance | | | | | |
| 43 | 52 | Beatriz Da Motta | Brazil | 112.48 | 2 | 39 | 114.63 | 6 | 23 | did not advance | | | | | |
| 44 | 37 | Michaela Corcoran | Ireland | 108.27 | 2 | 34 | 117.30 | 4 | 24 | did not advance | | | | | |
| 45 | 49 | Anastassiya Ananyeva | Kazakhstan | 174.94 | 58 | 53 | 118.08 | 6 | 25 | did not advance | | | | | |
| 46 | 47 | Atcharaporn Duanglawa | Thailand | 122.62 | 8 | 44 | 123.18 | 6 | 26 | did not advance | | | | | |
| 47 | 48 | Nerea Castiglione | Argentina | 141.64 | 2 | 47 | 125.53 | 6 | 27 | did not advance | | | | | |
| 48 | 32 | Alena Marx | Switzerland | 108.03 | 2 | 32 | 146.48 | 52 | 28 | did not advance | | | | | |
| 49 | 28 | Elena Micozzi | Italy | 105.83 | 0 | 30 | 157.13 | 54 | 29 | did not advance | | | | | |
| 50 | 43 | Ren Mishima | Japan | 159.72 | 52 | 49 | 157.55 | 52 | 30 | did not advance | | | | | |
| 51 | 41 | Lois Betteridge | Canada | 163.46 | 56 | 51 | 169.95 | 54 | 31 | did not advance | | | | | |
| 52 | 42 | Katja Bengeri | Croatia | 117.29 | 6 | 43 | 170.13 | 52 | 32 | did not advance | | | | | |
| 53 | 53 | Ana Fernandes Castro | Paraguay | 130.22 | 12 | 45 | 186.39 | 58 | 33 | did not advance | | | | | |
