= 2021 ICF Canoe Slalom World Championships – Women's C1 =

World championship canoeing event

Women's C1 at the 2021 ICF Canoe Slalom World Championships
- Venue: Čunovo Water Sports Centre
- Location: Bratislava, Slovakia
- Dates: 23–26 September 2021
- Competitors: 44 from 22 nations

Medalists
gold medal	Elena Apel	Germany
silver medal	Mallory Franklin	Great Britain
bronze medal	Gabriela Satková	Czech Republic

The Women's C1 at the 2021 ICF Canoe Slalom World Championships took place on 23 and 26 September 2021 at the Čunovo Water Sports Centre in Bratislava. It was the 9th official edition of the event, after it made its debut in 2010. 44 athletes from 22 nations competed.

The event was won by Elena Apel of Germany, securing her second medal of the Championships after she won silver in K1. Briton Mallory Franklin won silver for the fourth time, her fifth ever medal in this event. 2020 European Champion Gabriela Satková of the Czech Republic won bronze, her first individual medal at world championship level.

== Background ==
Andrea Herzog of Germany entered the event as the reigning world champion, having taken the title in 2019 in La Seu d'Urgell. This was the first World Championships since women's C1 made its Olympic debut at Tokyo, where Jess Fox won gold ahead of Mallory Franklin and Herzog. Czech Tereza Fišerová came into the event having taken her first World Cup overall title after winning the final round in Pau. All four were favourites for the title as the highest ranked athletes by the ICF.

== Competition format ==
The women's C1 event in canoe slalom uses a three-round format with heats, a semifinal and final. Athletes complete up to two runs in the heats. In the first heat, the 20 fastest women qualify automatically for the semifinal, whilst the rest complete another run in the repêchage second heat for a further 10 qualification positions. The final rank of non-qualifying athletes is determined by their second run score. Athletes start in the reverse order of their heats position in the semifinal and complete a single run, with the top 10 advancing to the final. The athlete with the best time in the single-run final is awarded gold.

Penalties of 2 or 50 seconds are incurred for infractions such as missing a gate, touching a gate, or not negotiating gates in numerical order. A team may request up to one review of a penalty per boat in the heats or semifinals phases, with no enquiries considered in the finals.

== Schedule ==
All times are Central European Summer Time (UTC+2)

Date	Time	Round
Thursday, 23 September 2021
Thursday, 23 September 2021	15:00	Heats Run 1
Thursday, 23 September 2021	17:00	Heats Run 2
Sunday, 26 September 2021
Sunday, 26 September 2021	09:03	Semifinal
Sunday, 26 September 2021	11:33	Final

== Results ==
Kimberley Woods set the fastest time in the first heat with a penalty-free 92.11. This was particularly significant, given she had been in a wheelchair a week earlier, following a car accident. Fellow countrywoman Mallory Franklin set the second fastest time, ahead of Australian Jessica Fox. World No. 5 Ana Sátila did not qualify directly to the semifinal after receiving a 50-second penalty but set the second fastest time of the day to win the second heat.

The Russian Canoe Federation's Alsu Minazova topped the semifinal with a time of 103.55 ahead of Angèle Hug of France. In an upset semifinal on a difficult course, Olympic Champion Fox, European Champion Miren Lazkano, World Cup overall winner Tereza Fišerová and reigning World Champion Andrea Herzog were all eliminated - the first two after incurring 50 second penalties. Fox' penalty meant that she would leave the World Championships without a medal in a canoe slalom event for the first time since 2011 and without making a final for the first time in her entire career.

Elena Apel of Germany backed up her silver medal in K1 by becoming the 2021 C1W World Champion in a time of 99.03, including a 2-second penalty. Olympic silver-medallist Franklin won silver, whilst 2020 European Champion Gabriela Satková took bronze. In a marked difference to the semifinal where just three athletes completed clean runs, only two athletes took penalties, including Apel.

Penalties are included in the time shown. The fastest time in each round is shown in bold.

Rank	Bib	Canoeist	Nation	Heats						Semifinal			Final		
Rank	Bib	Canoeist	Nation	Run 1			Run 2			Semifinal			Final		
Rank	Bib	Canoeist	Nation	Time	Pen.	Order	Time	Pen.	Order	Time	Pen.	Order	Time	Pen.	Order
1st place, gold medalist(s)	11	Elena Apel	Germany	96.44	2	5	-			108.00	4	8	**99.03**	2	1
2nd place, silver medalist(s)	2	Mallory Franklin	Great Britain	93.47	0	2	-			109.19	6	10	99.34	0	2
3rd place, bronze medalist(s)	26	Gabriela Satková	Czech Republic	98.31	0	10	-			105.25	0	4	102.50	0	3
4	16	Monika Škáchová	Slovakia	103.59	2	24	102.51	2	8	107.09	2	7	103.57	0	4
5	20	Marjorie Delassus	France	100.82	2	15	-			107.08	6	6	103.88	0	5
6	10	Noemie Fox	Australia	98.97	0	13	-			108.99	4	9	104.49	0	6
7	6	Núria Vilarrubla	Spain	95.89	0	4	-			104.84	0	3	104.71	0	7
8	15	Alsu Minazova	RCF	100.74	2	14	-			**103.55**	2	1	105.67	0	8
9	30	Angèle Hug	France	97.33	0	8	-			104.59	2	2	116.10	6	9
10	22	Alja Kozorog	Slovenia	100.92	0	16	-			106.48	2	5	117.40	0	10
11	8	Mònica Dòria	Andorra	97.27	0	7	-			109.20	4	11	did not advance		
12	21	Martina Satková	Czech Republic	103.50	0	23	98.93	0	3	109.73	2	12	did not advance		
13	3	Tereza Fišerová	Czech Republic	96.40	2	12	-			109.74	4	13	did not advance		
14	4	Andrea Herzog	Germany	97.82	2	9	-			109.85	8	14	did not advance		
15	7	Kimberley Woods	Great Britain	**92.11**	0	1	-			111.70	4	15	did not advance		
16	29	Elena Micozzi	Italy	106.67	2	29	99.49	2	4	113.41	6	16	did not advance		
17	12	Evy Leibfarth	USA	104.13	0	25	102.03	0	6	115.50	0	17	did not advance		
18	39	Zuzana Paňková	Slovakia	101.65	2	18	-			115.89	4	18	did not advance		
19	23	Polina Mukhgaleeva	RCF	102.92	4	22	105.93	4	10	116.31	4	19	did not advance		
20	14	Lucie Prioux	France	98.31	0	10	-			116.46	2	20	did not advance		
21	5	Ana Sátila	Brazil	150.24	50	39	**93.31**	0	1	116.50	6	21	did not advance		
22	31	Simona Glejteková	Slovakia	105.44	0	26	103.47	0	9	118.71	4	22	did not advance		
23	37	Hannah Thomas	New Zealand	114.25	6	35	102.25	2	7	126.39	4	23	did not advance		
24	19	Bethan Forrow	Great Britain	153.84	52	40	95.40	0	2	129.78	6	24	did not advance		
25	9	Klara Olazabal	Spain	97.13	0	6	-			141.95	6	25	did not advance		
26	1	Jessica Fox	Australia	94.06	0	3	-			149.06	50	26	did not advance		
27	13	Miren Lazkano	Spain	102.29	6	21	101.36	0	5	161.76	52	27	did not advance		
28	25	Aleksandra Stach	Poland	102.14	0	20	-			162.67	56	28	did not advance		
29	17	Viktoriia Us	Ukraine	101.04	2	17	-			163.63	52	29	did not advance		
30	33	Klaudia Zwolińska	Poland	101.66	4	19	-			170.75	54	30	did not advance		
31	38	Omira Estácia Neta	Brazil	111.80	4	34	106.72	0	11	did not advance					
32	34	Chiara Sabattini	Italy	165.78	52	41	109.37	4	12	did not advance					
33	42	Katja Bengeri	Croatia	123.71	6	38	109.94	4	13	did not advance					
34	35	Lois Betteridge	Canada	110.09	2	33	110.03	4	14	did not advance					
35	36	Alena Marx	Switzerland	106.29	2	28	113.94	4	15	did not advance					
36	18	Eva Alina Hočevar	Slovenia	109.26	4	32	113.94	4	16	did not advance					
37	28	Viktoriia Dobrotvorska	Ukraine	123.01	2	37	114.54	4	17	did not advance					
38	27	Zulfiia Sabitova	RCF	105.48	2	27	115.72	6	18	did not advance					
39	32	Lea Novak	Slovenia	108.08	2	31	123.07	0	19	did not advance					
40	41	Katarzyna Liber	Poland	122.38	6	36	124.54	2	20	did not advance					
41	40	Chung Yu-Han	Chinese Taipei	185.63	58	42	128.12	4	21	did not advance					
42	24	Marta Bertoncelli	Italy	107.20	0	30	149.20	50	22	did not advance					
43	44	Georgia Morou	Greece	340.42	210	43	314.25	158	23	did not advance					
44	43	Veronika Salaseviciute-Turbinova	Lithuania	353.97	168	44	551.76	358	24	did not advance					
