= 2022 ICF Canoe Slalom World Championships – Women's C1 =

Women's canoe at the 2022 ICF Canoe Slalom World Championships
- Venue: Augsburg Eiskanal
- Location: Augsburg, Germany
- Dates: 29-31 July 2022
- Competitors: 54 from 28 nations

Medalists
gold medal	Andrea Herzog	Germany
silver medal	Jessica Fox	Australia
bronze medal	Mallory Franklin	Great Britain

The women's canoe event at the 2022 ICF Canoe Slalom World Championships took place on 31 July 2022 at the Augsburg Eiskanal in Augsburg, with the qualification heats on 29 July 2022.

== Competition format ==
The event uses a three-round format with qualification heats, semifinal and final. Paddlers complete up to two runs in the heats, with the top ranked athletes starting last. In the first heat, the 20 fastest paddlers qualify automatically for the semifinal, whilst the rest compete in the second heat for additional 10 qualification spots. The final rank of non-qualifying athletes is determined by their second run score. Paddlers start in the reverse order of their heats position in the semifinal and complete a single run, with the top 10 advancing to the final. The start list for the final is once again in reverse order of the semifinal results. The athlete with the best time in the single-run final is awarded gold.

A penalty of 2 seconds is awarded for touching a gate and a 50-second penalty is awarded for missing a gate or negotiating it in the opposite direction.

An easier gate setup is generally used for the heats and then a more difficult one for semifinal and final.

== Schedule ==
All times are Central European Summer Time (UTC+2)

Date	Time	Round
29 July 2022
29 July 2022	09:15	Heats Run 1
29 July 2022	14:00	Heats Run 2
31 July 2022
31 July 2022	09:03	Semifinal
31 July 2022	11:35	Final

== Results ==
Penalties are included in the time shown. The fastest time in each round is shown in bold.

Rank	Bib	Athlete	Country	Heats						Semifinal			Final		
Rank	Bib	Athlete	Country	Run 1			Run 2			Semifinal			Final		
Rank	Bib	Athlete	Country	Time	Pen	Rank	Time	Pen	Rank	Time	Pen	Rank	Time	Pen	Rank
1st place, gold medalist(s)	5	Andrea Herzog	Germany	**103.34**	2	1	-			114.56	2	3	**111.72**	2	1
2nd place, silver medalist(s)	1	Jessica Fox	Australia	108.06	2	6	-			**112.04**	2	1	112.64	0	2
3rd place, bronze medalist(s)	2	Mallory Franklin	Great Britain	105.37	2	3	-			117.18	2	6	117.05	2	3
4	7	Kimberley Woods	Great Britain	110.73	2	9	-			116.71	2	5	117.74	2	4
5	25	Marta Bertoncelli	Italy	115.23	2	21	111.64	0	5	117.37	0	8	119.52	2	5
6	9	Marjorie Delassus	France	104.20	0	2	-			112.27	2	2	121.12	8	6
7	18	Gabriela Satková	Czech Republic	112.79	2	17	-			114.58	0	4	121.87	8	7
8	12	Noemie Fox	Australia	127.02	6	34	112.90	2	8	117.28	0	7	123.52	2	8
9	14	Viktoriia Us	Ukraine	117.03	0	25	**107.29**	0	1	119.52	0	10	124.18	0	9
10	13	Martina Satková	Czech Republic	111.81	2	12	-			118.26	2	9	125.67	6	10
11	11	Evy Leibfarth	United States	112.76	2	16	-			119.76	4	11	did not advance		
12	19	Eva Alina Hočevar	Slovenia	129.22	2	35	109.94	2	3	120.40	0	12	did not advance		
13	23	Kate Eckhardt	Australia	113.09	2	19	-			120.62	2	13	did not advance		
14	28	Klaudia Zwolińska	Poland	110.10	2	8	-			120.67	2	14	did not advance		
15	29	Ainhoa Lameiro	Spain	131.30	6	37	113.75	2	10	120.73	2	15	did not advance		
16	4	Elena Lilik	Germany	107.57	2	5	-			122.84	2	16	did not advance		
17	15	Klara Olazabal	Spain	114.17	0	20	-			123.04	2	17	did not advance		
18	20	Zuzana Paňková	Slovakia	108.92	0	7	-			126.02	2	18	did not advance		
19	3	Tereza Fišerová	Czech Republic	132.84	4	40	107.61	0	2	126.67	2	19	did not advance		
20	30	Soňa Stanovská	Slovakia	236.49	104	49	113.49	2	9	127.66	2	20	did not advance		
21	38	Laurène Roisin	France	115.55	4	23	112.28	2	7	127.70	6	21	did not advance		
22	8	Viktoria Wolffhardt	Austria	111.48	0	11	-			127.87	6	22	did not advance		
23	26	Emanuela Luknárová	Slovakia	111.85	0	13	-			128.80	8	23	did not advance		
24	24	Aleksandra Stach	Poland	116.92	6	24	111.13	0	4	128.85	6	24	did not advance		
25	22	Sophie Ogilvie	Great Britain	176.76	52	43	111.81	4	6	133.03	4	25	did not advance		
26	10	Mònica Dòria Vilarrubla	Andorra	112.24	4	15	-			136.79	4	26	did not advance		
27	6	Ana Sátila	Brazil	112.94	4	18	-			172.57	54	27	did not advance		
28	16	Lucie Baudu	France	106.95	0	4	-			176.22	54	28	did not advance		
29	37	Michaela Corcoran	Ireland	112.15	0	14	-			183.90	58	29	did not advance		
30	27	Elena Borghi	Italy	111.47	0	10	-			224.89	102	30	did not advance		
31	33	Lea Novak	Slovenia	123.94	6	31	115.24	2	11	did not advance					
32	32	Nele Bayn	Germany	121.06	4	30	116.96	2	12	did not advance					
33	35	Alena Marx	Switzerland	120.99	6	29	118.19	6	13	did not advance					
34	40	Lyu Minzhen	China	132.22	4	38	119.68	2	14	did not advance					
35	36	Lois Betteridge	Canada	182.45	56	44	120.79	2	15	did not advance					
36	34	Hannah Thomas	New Zealand	225.41	104	48	123.08	4	16	did not advance					
37	39	Lena Teunissen	Netherlands	126.16	4	33	123.60	6	17	did not advance					
38	45	Huang Yanzhi	China	223.07	100	47	126.67	4	18	did not advance					
39	41	Omira Estácia Neta	Brazil	117.86	4	27	127.56	0	19	did not advance					
40	47	Marcella Altman	United States	185.92	58	45	129.55	4	20	did not advance					
41	31	Viktoriia Dobrotvorska	Ukraine	118.50	0	28	131.05	2	21	did not advance					
42	53	Kader Korkmaz	Turkey	365.71	164	50	135.15	4	22	did not advance					
43	42	Ren Mishima	Japan	125.47	2	32	141.08	0	23	did not advance					
44	52	Anastassiya Ananyeva	Kazakhstan	141.31	6	42	158.62	8	24	did not advance					
45	17	Alja Kozorog	Slovenia	117.10	2	26	161.06	52	25	did not advance					
46	44	Ana Fernandes Castro	Paraguay	203.58	52	46	161.50	12	26	did not advance					
47	21	Miren Lazkano	Spain	115.33	2	22	178.04	50	27	did not advance					
48	43	Yang Liu	China	130.02	4	36	193.04	60	28	did not advance					
49	48	Katja Bengeri	Croatia	134.82	6	41	220.43	104	29	did not advance					
50	46	Isabella Altman	United States	132.83	0	39	233.82	108	30	did not advance					
51	50	Georgia Morou	Greece	385.32	212	51	267.58	112	31	did not advance					
52	49	Jahanvi Shrivastava	India	515.79	214	52	484.23	216	32	did not advance					
53	54	Rina Sen	India	588.65	266	53	610.70	364	33	did not advance					
54	51	Ahna Yadav	India	749.16	520	54	712.52	506	34	did not advance					
