= 2023 Canoe Slalom World Cup =

Canoe Slalom World Cup

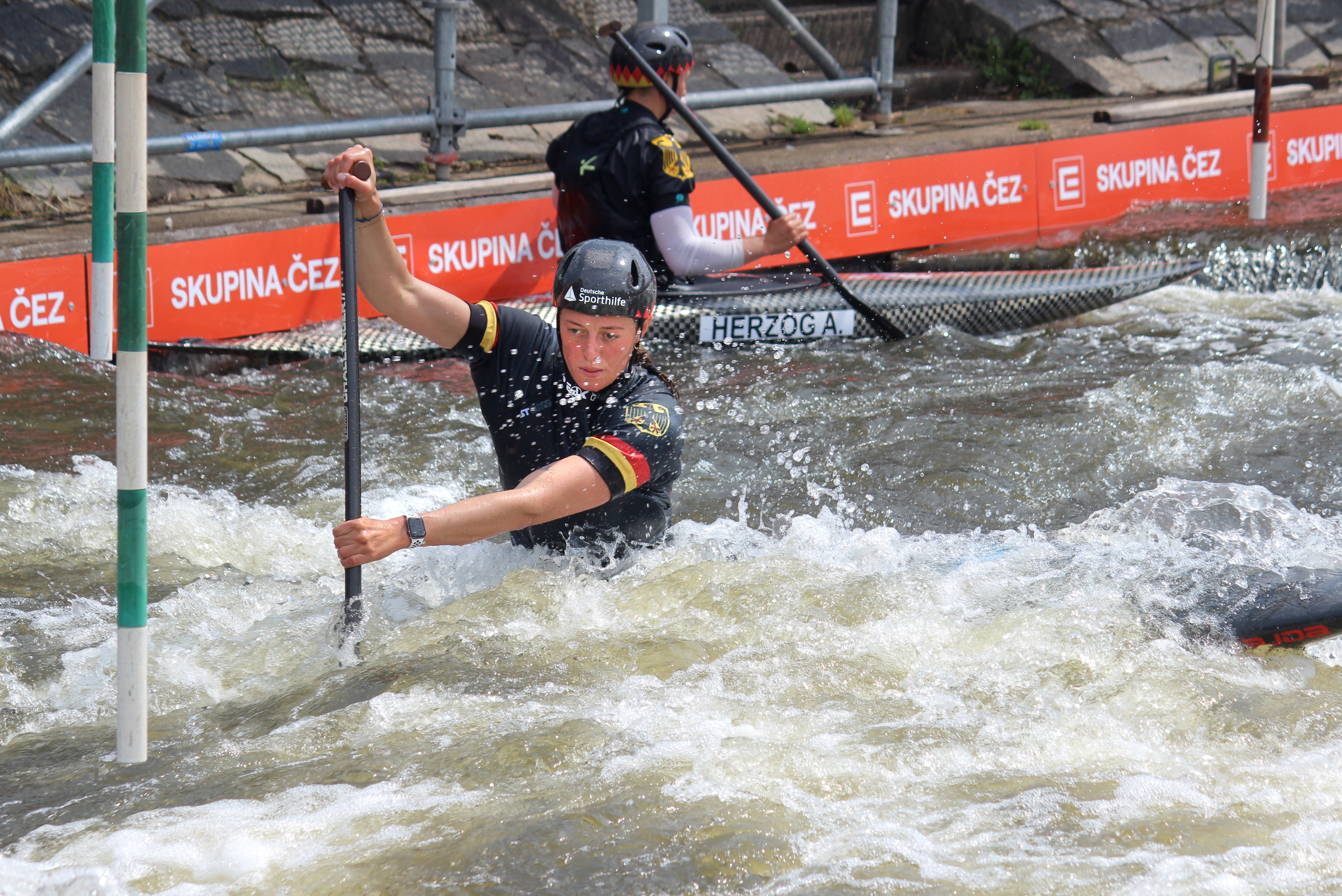
Nele Bayn (Germany) at the Canoe Slalom WC Prague

The 2023 Canoe Slalom World Cup was the highest level season-long series of competitions across six canoe slalom disciplines organized by the International Canoe Federation (ICF). It was the 36th edition and featured five stops (or races) in five different venues.

Canoeists competed for the title of the overall world cup champion in each of the six disciplines (3 for men and 3 for women), which was determined by the total number of points obtained from the five races.

== Calendar ==
The series opened with World Cup Race 1 in Augsburg, Germany (1–4 June) and concluded with the World Cup Final in Vaires-sur-Marne, France (5-8 October).

Label	Venue	Date
World Cup Race 1	(Germany) Augsburg	1–4 June
World Cup Race 2	(Czech Republic) Prague	8–11 June
World Cup Race 3	(Slovenia) Tacen	15–18 June
World Cup Race 4	(Spain) La Seu	31 August – 3 September
World Cup Final	(France) Vaires-sur-Marne	5–8 October

== Standings ==
The winner of each race was awarded 60 points (with double points awarded for the World Cup Final). Points for lower places differed from one category to another. Every participant was guaranteed at least 2 points for participation and 5 points for qualifying for the semifinal.

=== C1 men ===
Pos	Athlete	GER (Germany)	CZE (Czech Republic)	SLO (Slovenia)	ESP (Spain)	FRA (France)	Points
1	Luka Božič (SLO)	9	16	1	2	4	270
2	Matej Beňuš (SVK)	2	2	8	5	8	268
3	Raffaello Ivaldi (ITA)	17	4	30	1	1	257
4	Benjamin Savšek (SLO)	7	1	3	29	9	229
5	Jiří Prskavec (CZE)	3	9	12	24	5	222
6	Adam Burgess (GBR)	15	8	5	8	10	216
7	Miquel Travé (ESP)		5		6	3	186
8	Nicolas Gestin (FRA)	4	26		7	6	183
9	Marko Mirgorodský (SVK)	11	13		3	11	176
10	Václav Chaloupka (CZE)	5	6		14	15	171

=== C1 women ===
Pos	Athlete	GER (Germany)	CZE (Czech Republic)	SLO (Slovenia)	ESP (Spain)	FRA (France)	Points
1	Jessica Fox (AUS)	1	1	10	1	1	334
2	Kimberley Woods (GBR)	7	5		3	5	222
3	Viktoriia Us (UKR)	13	13	2	8	11	217
4	Elena Lilik (GER)	3	8	1	15	28	194
5	Zuzana Paňková (SVK)	8	6		19	6	188
6	Evy Leibfarth (USA)	19	11	15	12	10	183
7	Mallory Franklin (GBR)		4		9	3	182
8	Noemie Fox (AUS)	28	24	4	17	7	178
9	Gabriela Satková (CZE)		3		25	2	175
10	Angèle Hug (FRA)	2	9		21	16	167

=== K1 men ===
Pos	Athlete	GER (Germany)	CZE (Czech Republic)	SLO (Slovenia)	ESP (Spain)	FRA (France)	Points
1	Vít Přindiš (CZE)	11	2	2	3	2	304
2	Giovanni De Gennaro (ITA)	1	3	6	7	9	271
3	Jiří Prskavec (CZE)	5	1	1	38	7	252
4	Jonny Dickson (GBR)	19	6	14	9	2	248
5	Titouan Castryck (FRA)	10	5		5	1	244
6	Lucien Delfour (AUS)	4	8	10	11	6	240
7	Joseph Clarke (GBR)	2	21	9	2	16	231
8	Hannes Aigner (GER)	3	9	4	17	11	229
9	Jakub Krejčí (CZE)	6	7	30	12	17	187
10	Dariusz Popiela (POL)	9	33	5	15	15	184

=== K1 women ===
Pos	Athlete	GER (Germany)	CZE (Czech Republic)	SLO (Slovenia)	ESP (Spain)	FRA (France)	Points
1	Jessica Fox (AUS)	26	1	1	2	1	308
2	Elena Lilik (GER)	1	12	3	5	4	277
3	Klaudia Zwolińska (POL)	4	7	4	13	3	262
4	Stefanie Horn (ITA)	2	14		3	10	202
5	Mònica Dòria Vilarrubla (AND)	7	9		8	7	194
6	Eva Terčelj (SLO)	18	16	5	16	12	185
7	Corinna Kuhnle (AUT)		5	13		2	184
8	Luuka Jones (NZL)		6	23	14	5	178
9	Viktoriia Us (UKR)	16	26	2	12	22	168
10	Eliška Mintálová (SVK)	10	18		1	20	165

=== Kayak cross men ===
Pos	Athlete	GER (Germany)	CZE (Czech Republic)	SLO (Slovenia)	ESP (Spain)	FRA (France)	Points
1	Joseph Clarke (GBR)	3	35	1	2	13	189
2	Boris Neveu (FRA)	61	7		9	1	171
3	Timothy Anderson (AUS)	5	12	8	12	6	161
4	Finn Butcher (NZL)		48	26	5	2	156
5	Jan Rohrer (SUI)	8	2		1	22	148
6	Titouan Castryck (FRA)	14	3		34	5	141
7	Anatole Delassus (FRA)			2	3	10	139
8	Dimitri Marx (SUI)	34	1		4	14	125
9	Vít Přindiš (CZE)	26	11	14	33	4	120
10	Isak Öhrström (SWE)	19	8	6		8	114

=== Kayak cross women ===
Pos	Athlete	GER (Germany)	CZE (Czech Republic)	SLO (Slovenia)	ESP (Spain)	FRA (France)	Points
1	Kimberley Woods (GBR)	25	1		2	2	229
2	Luuka Jones (NZL)		9	7	6	1	204
3	Jessica Fox (AUS)		5	3	18	3	194
4	Stefanie Horn (ITA)	1	3		7	14	158
5	Veronika Vojtová (CZE)	5	35	1		8	152
6	Noemie Fox (AUS)	26	26	5	13	5	139
7	Viktoriia Us (UKR)	6	16	14	5	9	127
8	Nikita Setchell (GBR)	35	34	13	10	4	122
9	Ana Sátila (BRA)	2	25	4		21	112
10	Tereza Fišerová (CZE)	10	2		8	18	105

== Points ==
- World Cup points were awarded based on the results of each race at each event as follows:

Position	1st	2nd	3rd	4th	5th	6th	7th	8th	9th	10th
C1 M	60	55	50	46	44	42	40	38	36	34
C1 W	60	55	50	46	44	42	40	38	36	34
K1 M	60	55	50	44	43	42	41	40	39	38
K1 W	60	55	50	46	44	42	40	38	36	34
Kayak cross	60	55	50	45	40	35	30	25	19	17

== Results ==
=== World Cup Race 1 ===
1–4 June in Augsburg, Germany

Event	Gold	Score	Silver	Score	Bronze	Score
C1 men	Sideris Tasiadis (GER)	98.25	Matej Beňuš (SVK)	101.33	Jiří Prskavec (CZE)	101.44
C1 women	Jessica Fox (AUS)	105.04	Angèle Hug (FRA)	111.55	Elena Lilik (GER)	112.10
K1 men	Giovanni De Gennaro (ITA)	90.71	Joseph Clarke (GBR)	93.69	Hannes Aigner (GER)	93.74
K1 women	Elena Lilik (GER)	101.66	Stefanie Horn (ITA)	105.95	Viktoria Wolffhardt (AUT)	106.14
Kayak cross men	Benjamin Renia (FRA)		Martin Dougoud (SUI)		Joseph Clarke (GBR)	
Kayak cross women	Stefanie Horn (ITA)		Ana Sátila (BRA)		Mònica Dòria Vilarrubla (AND)	

=== World Cup Race 2 ===
8–11 June in Prague, Czech Republic

Event	Gold	Score	Silver	Score	Bronze	Score
C1 men	Benjamin Savšek (SLO)	97.65	Matej Beňuš (SVK)	101.26	Jules Bernardet (FRA)	102.90
C1 women	Jessica Fox (AUS)	109.13	Mònica Dòria Vilarrubla (AND)	110.57	Gabriela Satková (CZE)	111.02
K1 men	Jiří Prskavec (CZE)	89.67	Vít Přindiš (CZE)	90.55	Giovanni De Gennaro (ITA)	90.82
K1 women	Jessica Fox (AUS)	98.95	Ricarda Funk (GER)	103.58	Mallory Franklin (GBR)	104.90
Kayak cross men	Dimitri Marx (SUI)		Jan Rohrer (SUI)		Titouan Castryck (FRA)	
Kayak cross women	Kimberley Woods (GBR)		Tereza Fišerová (CZE)		Stefanie Horn (ITA)	

=== World Cup Race 3 ===
15–18 June in Tacen, Slovenia. The third world cup was skipped by many of the top European paddlers in favor of preparation for the European Games in Kraków, which would also serve as the European qualifier for the 2024 Summer Olympics.

Event	Gold	Score	Silver	Score	Bronze	Score
C1 men	Luka Božič (SLO)	90.29	Zachary Lokken (USA)	91.43	Benjamin Savšek (SLO)	93.14
C1 women	Elena Lilik (GER)	101.97	Viktoriia Us (UKR)	105.27	Eva Alina Hočevar (SLO)	108.00
K1 men	Jiří Prskavec (CZE)	85.02	Vít Přindiš (CZE)	89.46	Felix Oschmautz (AUT)	90.05
K1 women	Jessica Fox (AUS)	96.22	Viktoriia Us (UKR)	98.91	Elena Lilik (GER)	98.92
Kayak cross men	Joseph Clarke (GBR)		Anatole Delassus (FRA)		Stefan Hengst (GER)	
Kayak cross women	Veronika Vojtová (CZE)		Eva Terčelj (SLO)		Jessica Fox (AUS)	

=== World Cup Race 4 ===
31 August – 3 September in La Seu, Spain

Event	Gold	Score	Silver	Score	Bronze	Score
C1 men	Raffaello Ivaldi (ITA)	96.52	Luka Božič (SLO)	97.53	Marko Mirgorodský (SVK)	97.63
C1 women	Jessica Fox (AUS)	107.09	Andrea Herzog (GER)	107.17	Kimberley Woods (GBR)	109.02
K1 men	Peter Kauzer (SLO)	89.36	Joseph Clarke (GBR)	90.44	Vít Přindiš (CZE)	90.90
K1 women	Eliška Mintálová (SVK)	99.36	Jessica Fox (AUS)	99.42	Stefanie Horn (ITA)	100.23
Kayak cross men	Jan Rohrer (SUI)		Joseph Clarke (GBR)		Anatole Delassus (FRA)	
Kayak cross women	Elena Lilik (GER)		Kimberley Woods (GBR)		Ricarda Funk (GER)	

=== World Cup Final ===
5–8 October in Vaires-sur-Marne, France. This was the first major international competition on the new course built for the 2024 Summer Olympics in Paris. The competition format mimicked that which would be used at the Olympics, i.e. different from regular World Cup events. With the number of participants that meant top 24 boats progressing to the semifinals from the heats (best of 2 runs) and then top 12 to the finals in the classic slalom events. The kayak cross events included repechage rounds.

Event	Gold	Score	Silver	Score	Bronze	Score
C1 men	Raffaello Ivaldi (ITA)	95.50	Franz Anton (GER)	96.18	Miquel Travé (ESP)	96.83
C1 women	Jessica Fox (AUS)	106.04	Gabriela Satková (CZE)	110.08	Mallory Franklin (GBR)	111.97
K1 men	Titouan Castryck (FRA)	89.20	Vít Přindiš (CZE); Jonny Dickson (GBR)	91.78	-	
K1 women	Jessica Fox (AUS)	100.78	Corinna Kuhnle (AUT)	102.37	Klaudia Zwolińska (POL)	102.73
Kayak cross men	Boris Neveu (FRA)		Finn Butcher (NZL)		Felix Oschmautz (AUT)	
Kayak cross women	Luuka Jones (NZL)		Kimberley Woods (GBR)		Jessica Fox (AUS)	
