= 2021 ICF Canoe Slalom World Championships – Women's K1 =

World championship canoeing event

Women's K1 at the 2021 ICF Canoe Slalom World Championships
- Venue: Čunovo Water Sports Centre
- Location: Bratislava, Slovakia
- Dates: 23–25 September 2021
- Competitors: 58 from 29 nations

Medalists
gold medal	Ricarda Funk	Germany
silver medal	Elena Apel	Germany
bronze medal	Kimberley Woods	Great Britain

The Women's K1 at the 2021 ICF Canoe Slalom World Championships took place on 23 and 25 September 2021 at the Čunovo Water Sports Centre in Bratislava. It was the 41st edition of the event, and 58 athletes from 29 nations competed.

== Background ==
Eva Terčelj of Slovenia entered as the reigning world champion, having taken the title in 2019 in La Seu d'Urgell. Jess Fox was the World No. 1 and came into the championship having won the 2021 World Cup overall title and the last three World Cups. Ricarda Funk was the Olympic Champion from Tokyo and had the opportunity to become the first athlete to win the Olympics and World Championships in the same calendar year. World number 3 Corinna Kuhnle was also a favourite, as the winner of the 2019 World Cup round on this course and having become European Champion earlier this year.

3-time Olympic medallist Maialen Chourraut and World No. 5 Stefanie Horn were notable absentees from the field. Leading into the event, Jana Dukátová announced her retirement, ending a 25-year career that saw her become a three-time World Champion: 2006 in K1; 2010 in C1; and 2011 in K1 team.

== Competition format ==
The women's K1 event in canoe slalom uses a three-round format with heats, a semifinal and final. Athletes complete up to two runs in the heats. In the first heat, the 20 fastest women qualify automatically for the semifinal, whilst the rest complete another run in the repêchage second heat for a further 10 qualification positions. The final rank of non-qualifying athletes is determined by their second run score. Athletes start in the reverse order of their heats position in the semifinal and complete a single run, with the top 10 advancing to the final. The athlete with the best time in the single-run final is awarded gold.

Penalties of 2 or 50 seconds are incurred for infractions such as missing a gate, touching a gate, or not negotiating gates in numerical order. A team may request up to one review of a penalty per boat in the heats or semifinals phases, with no enquiries considered in the finals.

== Schedule ==
All times are Central European Summer Time (UTC+2)

Date	Time	Round
Thursday, 23 September 2021
Thursday, 23 September 2021	09:00	Heats Run 1
Thursday, 23 September 2021	11:50	Heats Run 2
Saturday, 25 September 2021
Saturday, 25 September 2021	09:03	Semifinal
Saturday, 25 September 2021	12:03	Final

== Results ==
Tokyo Olympic bronze-medallist Jessica Fox topped the first heat with a clean 89.18 ahead of Olympic Champion Ricarda Funk. Camille Prigent won the second heat with the fourth-fastest time of the day. 2016 Olympic silver-medallist Luuka Jones finished 14th in the second heat, missing out on a spot in the semifinal.

Despite 4 seconds of penalties, Funk topped the semifinal ahead of Corinna Kuhnle and Fiona Pennie. Fox initially set the fastest time but was awarded a 50-second penalty on downstream gate 12, placing 25th. Reigning Champion Eva Terčelj also received a 50-second penalty, finishing 26th. This left Kuhnle as the only previous World Champion (2010 and 2011) in the final.

Funk won the 2021 K1W World Championship in a time of 94.80, including a 2-second penalty. Fellow countrywoman Elena Apel won silver, forming the first quinella in this event since Angelika Bahmann and Petra Krol finished 1–2 in 1977. Great Britain's Kimberley Woods won bronze, 3 days after winning the teams title and just a week after being involved in a car accident whilst preparing for the event. Funk's victory marked the first time any canoe slalom athlete became Olympic and World Champion in the same calendar year.

Penalties are included in the time shown. The fastest time in each round is shown in bold.

Rank	Bib	Canoeist	Nation	Heats						Semifinal			Final		
Rank	Bib	Canoeist	Nation	Run 1			Run 2			Semifinal			Final		
Rank	Bib	Canoeist	Nation	Time	Pen.	Order	Time	Pen.	Order	Time	Pen.	Order	Tme	Pen.	Order
1st place, gold medalist(s)	2	Ricarda Funk	Germany	89.99	0	2	-			**98.21**	4	1	**94.80**	2	1
2nd place, silver medalist(s)	19	Elena Apel	Germany	91.99	0	4	-			101.45	2	7	97.31	0	2
3rd place, bronze medalist(s)	14	Kimberley Woods	Great Britain	96.90	0	16	-			102.46	6	8	97.90	2	3
4	3	Corinna Kuhnle	Austria	92.85	0	7	-			98.48	2	2	98.60	4	4
5	17	Fiona Pennie	Great Britain	97.88	2	24	91.51	0	2	99.05	0	3	99.84	4	5
6	23	Antonie Galušková	Czech Republic	100.02	2	31	95.23	0	6	100.96	0	5	101.29	2	6
7	11	Klaudia Zwolińska	Poland	97.27	0	18	-			101.02	4	6	104.10	0	7
8	12	Viktoriia Us	Ukraine	95.32	0	11	-			103.24	2	9	109.17	8	8
9	15	Marie-Zelia Lafont	France	97.74	4	23	96.60	0	9	103.71	4	10	148.94	50	9
10	8	Camille Prigent	France	98.58	0	26	**91.32**	0	1	99.17	2	4	207.28	100	10
11	20	Evy Leibfarth	USA	95.63	0	13	-			104.91	4	11	did not advance		
12	5	Mallory Franklin	Great Britain	96.93	2	17	-			106.57	0	12	did not advance		
13	32	Marta Bertoncelli	Italy	152.63	52	48	97.11	0	10	106.60	2	13	did not advance		
14	27	Ajda Novak	Slovenia	97.37	0	19	-			106.74	4	14	did not advance		
15	7	Kateřina Minařík Kudějová	Czech Republic	95.21	2	10	-			107.28	2	15	did not advance		
16	24	Noemie Fox	Australia	96.42	0	15	-			107.65	4	16	did not advance		
17	30	Jana Dukátová	Slovakia	94.75	0	9	-			108.49	2	17	did not advance		
18	21	Lucie Nesnídalová	Czech Republic	95.65	2	14	-			108.72	6	18	did not advance		
19	13	Eliška Mintálová	Slovakia	91.29	0	3	-			109.16	0	19	did not advance		
20	29	Soňa Stanovská	Slovakia	107.81	4	39	94.97	0	5	111.32	2	20	did not advance		
21	9	Urša Kragelj	Slovenia	92.76	2	5	-			112.34	2	21	did not advance		
22	22	Mònica Dòria	Andorra	98.53	2	29	94.15	2	4	115.62	4	22	did not advance		
23	10	Ana Sátila	Brazil	92.80	2	6	-			118.63	2	23	did not advance		
24	26	Ekaterina Perova	RCF	110.27	2	43	96.21	0	7	120.26	0	24	did not advance		
25	1	Jessica Fox	Australia	**89.18**	0	1	-			146.47	50	25	did not advance		
26	4	Eva Terčelj	Slovenia	95.56	0	12	-			148.54	50	26	did not advance		
27	16	Natalia Pacierpnik	Poland	97.61	4	21	93.41	0	3	154.15	50	27	did not advance		
28	48	Miren Lazkano	Spain	97.55	0	20	-			161.75	52	28	did not advance		
29	18	Martina Wegman	Netherlands	93.20	0	8	-			163.33	50	29	did not advance		
30	40	Alena Marx	Switzerland	98.48	0	25	96.49	0	8	163.57	50	30	did not advance		
31	31	Alsu Minazova	RCF	152.43	50	47	97.30	2	11	did not advance					
32	28	Romane Prigent	France	99.71	0	29	97.69	4	12	did not advance					
33	42	Kseniia Krylova	RCF	99.62	2	28	97.72	0	13	did not advance					
34	6	Luuka Jones	New Zealand	105.48	4	38	98.01	2	14	did not advance					
35	36	Hannah Thomas	New Zealand	103.90	0	34	98.15	2	15	did not advance					
36	39	Lois Betteridge	Canada	114.91	8	45	98.57	0	16	did not advance					
37	25	Laia Sorribes	Spain	97.65	0	22	99.46	0	17	did not advance					
38	34	Chiara Sabattini	Italy	99.91	2	30	99.83	0	18	did not advance					
39	33	Antonia Oschmautz	Austria	108.62	4	41	99.84	2	19	did not advance					
40	38	Courtney Williams	New Zealand	203.73	104	51	100.51	0	20	did not advance					
41	53	Olatz Arregui	Spain	104.89	2	37	100.90	4	21	did not advance					
42	51	Katja Bengeri	Croatia	104.77	4	36	104.10	2	22	did not advance					
43	35	Omira Estácia Neta	Brazil	103.27	2	32	107.54	4	23	did not advance					
44	41	Monika Mitasikova	Sweden	113.91	0	44	108.09	2	24	did not advance					
45	44	Chang Chu-Han	Chinese Taipei	108.91	2	42	108.64	4	25	did not advance					
46	49	Marcella Altman	USA	108.09	0	40	110.29	6	26	did not advance					
47	52	Aleksandra Stach	Poland	158.37	52	49	115.15	2	27	did not advance					
48	50	Lea Baldoni	Canada	103.54	2	33	118.09	6	28	did not advance					
49	57	Wu Ting-I	Chinese Taipei	372.30	254	57	130.03	4	29	did not advance					
50	45	Sara Timea Seprenyi	Hungary	227.16	106	52	132.03	4	30	did not advance					
51	37	Naemi Brändle	Switzerland	103.94	0	35	161.74	52	31	did not advance					
52	47	Iisa Maenpaa	Finland	143.55	4	46	180.26	56	32	did not advance					
53	46	Roxana Razeghian	Iran	382.35	256	58	184.05	56	33	did not advance					
54	55	Veronika Salaseviciute-Turbinova	Lithuania	197.70	16	50	233.63	68	34	did not advance					
55	43	Maartje Otten	Netherlands	298.11	202	55	265.03	156	35	did not advance					
56	54	Constanza Nobis	Chile	255.81	56	53	383.23	210	36	did not advance					
57	58	Iris Sommernes	Norway	352.90	154	56	390.43	156	37	did not advance					
58	56	Florencia Aguirre Gonzalez	Chile	262.85	110	54	DNF	256	38	did not advance					
