= Jessica Fox (canoeist) =

Australian canoeist (born 1994)

Jessica Fox OAM
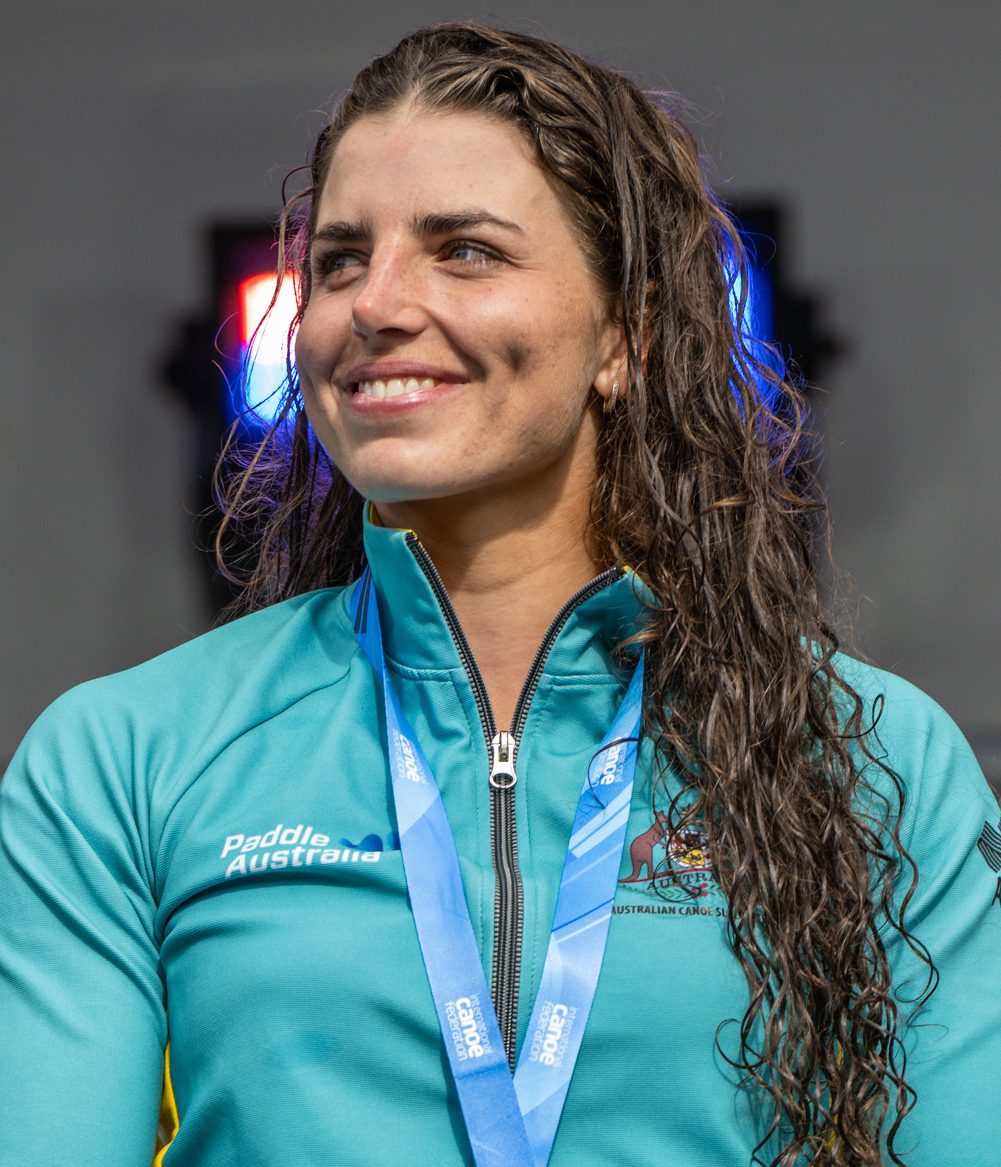
- Fox at the 2022 World Championships

Personal information
- Nickname: Foxy
- Nationality: Australian, French
- Born: 11 June 1994 (age 32) Marseille, France
- Height: 166 cm (5 ft 5 in)
- Weight: 60 kg (132 lb)
- Website: jessicafox.com.au

Sport
- Country: Australia
- Sport: Canoe slalom
- Event: K1, C1, Kayak cross
- Club: Penrith Valley Canoeing
Medal record
Women's canoe slalom
Event	1st	2nd	3rd
Olympic Games	3	1	2
World Championships	17	5	3
Youth Olympic Games	1	0	0
U23 World Championships	8	1	4
Junior World Championships	4	0	0
Total	33	7	9
Representing Australia
Olympic Games
Gold medal – first place	2020 Tokyo	C1
Gold medal – first place	2024 Paris	K1
Gold medal – first place	2024 Paris	C1
Silver medal – second place	2012 London	K1
Bronze medal – third place	2016 Rio de Janeiro	K1
Bronze medal – third place	2020 Tokyo	K1
World Championships
Gold medal – first place	2013 Prague	C1
Gold medal – first place	2013 Prague	C1 team
Gold medal – first place	2014 Deep Creek Lake	C1
Gold medal – first place	2014 Deep Creek Lake	K1
Gold medal – first place	2015 London	C1
Gold medal – first place	2015 London	C1 team
Gold medal – first place	2017 Pau	K1
Gold medal – first place	2018 Rio de Janeiro	C1
Gold medal – first place	2018 Rio de Janeiro	K1
Gold medal – first place	2019 La Seu d'Urgell	C1 team
Gold medal – first place	2021 Bratislava	Kayak cross
Gold medal – first place	2022 Augsburg	Kayak cross
Gold medal – first place	2023 London	K1
Gold medal – first place	2023 London	K1 team
Gold medal – first place	2026 Oklahoma City	K1
Gold medal – first place	2026 Oklahoma City	Kayak cross individual
Gold medal – first place	2026 Oklahoma City	K1 team
Silver medal – second place	2017 Pau	C1 team
Silver medal – second place	2019 La Seu d'Urgell	C1
Silver medal – second place	2019 La Seu d'Urgell	K1
Silver medal – second place	2022 Augsburg	C1
Silver medal – second place	2022 Augsburg	K1
Bronze medal – third place	2010 Tacen	C1
Bronze medal – third place	2017 Pau	K1 team
Bronze medal – third place	2023 London	C1
Oceania Championships
Gold medal – first place	2025 Penrith	C1
Gold medal – first place	2025 Penrith	K1
Silver medal – second place	2025 Penrith	Kayak cross
Youth Olympic Games
Gold medal – first place	2010 Singapore	K1
U23 World Championships
Gold medal – first place	2012 Wausau	C1 team
Gold medal – first place	2013 Liptovský Mikuláš	C1
Gold medal – first place	2014 Penrith	C1
Gold medal – first place	2014 Penrith	K1
Gold medal – first place	2015 Foz do Iguaçu	K1
Gold medal – first place	2016 Kraków	C1
Gold medal – first place	2016 Kraków	K1
Gold medal – first place	2017 Bratislava	K1
Silver medal – second place	2015 Foz do Iguaçu	K1 team
Bronze medal – third place	2013 Liptovský Mikuláš	C1 team
Bronze medal – third place	2014 Penrith	K1 team
Bronze medal – third place	2016 Kraków	C1 team
Bronze medal – third place	2017 Bratislava	K1 team
Junior World Championships
Gold medal – first place	2010 Foix	C1
Gold medal – first place	2010 Foix	K1
Gold medal – first place	2012 Wausau	C1
Gold medal – first place	2012 Wausau	K1

Jessica Esther Fox OAM (born 11 June 1994) is a French-born Australian Olympic and world champion slalom canoeist.

Fox made her Olympic debut at 18 years of age in the 2012 Summer Olympics in London, where she won a silver medal in the K1 event. She won a bronze medal in the same event four years later in the Rio de Janeiro Olympics, and again at the 2020 Tokyo Summer Olympics, before finally winning the gold medal in the K1 event in Paris at the 2024 Summer Olympics. Fox is the sole Olympic champion in the C1 event, having won the gold medal in Tokyo at the 2020 Summer Olympics when the event debuted at the Olympic Games, and again finishing first at the 2024 Summer Olympics. Her six olympic medals make her the most decorated canoe slalom paddler, male or female, in Olympic history. She also won a gold medal at the 2010 Summer Youth Olympics in the K1 event.

Fox has won 25 medals at the ICF Canoe Slalom World Championships with 17 golds (C1: 2013, 2014, 2015, 2018; K1: 2014, 2017, 2018, 2023, 2026; C1 team: 2013, 2015, 2019; K1 team: 2023, 2026; Kayak cross: 2021, 2022; Kayak cross individual: 2026), five silvers (C1: 2019, 2022; K1: 2019, 2022; C1 team: 2017) and three bronzes (C1: 2010, 2023; K1 team: 2017). Her 12 gold medals in individual events make her the most successful paddler, male or female, in World Championship history.

Fox has won the overall World Cup title seven times in the C1 class (2013, 2015, 2017, 2018, 2019, 2023, 2024) and six times in the K1 class (2018, 2019, 2021, 2022, 2023, 2026). She has finished the year as the World No. 1 in C1 12 times, including an uninterrupted streak from 2013 to 2023, and World No. 1 in K1 eight times.

Fox, a 12-time individual world champion, 13-time World Cup champion and three-time individual Olympic champion, is considered the greatest individual paddler of all time.

During the Paris 2024 Olympic Games Fox was elected to the IOC Athletes' Commission as one of four new members until the Brisbane 2032 Games.

== Early life ==
Fox was born in Marseille, France, and when she was four years old, she moved to the suburb of Penrith, in Sydney, with her family. Fox is Jewish, as is her mother, whereas her father is not. Her parents are Richard Fox and Myriam Fox-Jerusalmi, who both competed as canoeists at the Olympics: her father for Great Britain at the 1992 Games, and her mother for France at the 1996 Games, where she won a bronze medal. Her father is Second Vice President of the International Canoe Federation, as well as Australian Canoeing's high-performance manager, and a five-time world champion. Her younger sister Noemie Fox is also a world and Olympic champion slalom canoeist, and her aunt Rachel Crosbee is a former world championship slalom canoe silver medalist.

Fox attended Leonay Public School and then Blaxland High School, where she completed her HSC year in 2011 by ranking first in New South Wales for PDHPE, and achieved an ATAR score of 99.1. She studied in the Elite Athlete Program at the University of Sydney, where she is working on a degree in media/communications. She is studying for a Bachelor of Social Science (Psychology) at Swinburne Online. She is bilingual in English and French.

Fox suffered a back injury that impacted her performance in 2012. In 2025, she underwent surgery to remove a kidney tumour, forcing her withdrawal from the Canoe Slalom World Cup in Europe.

== Career ==
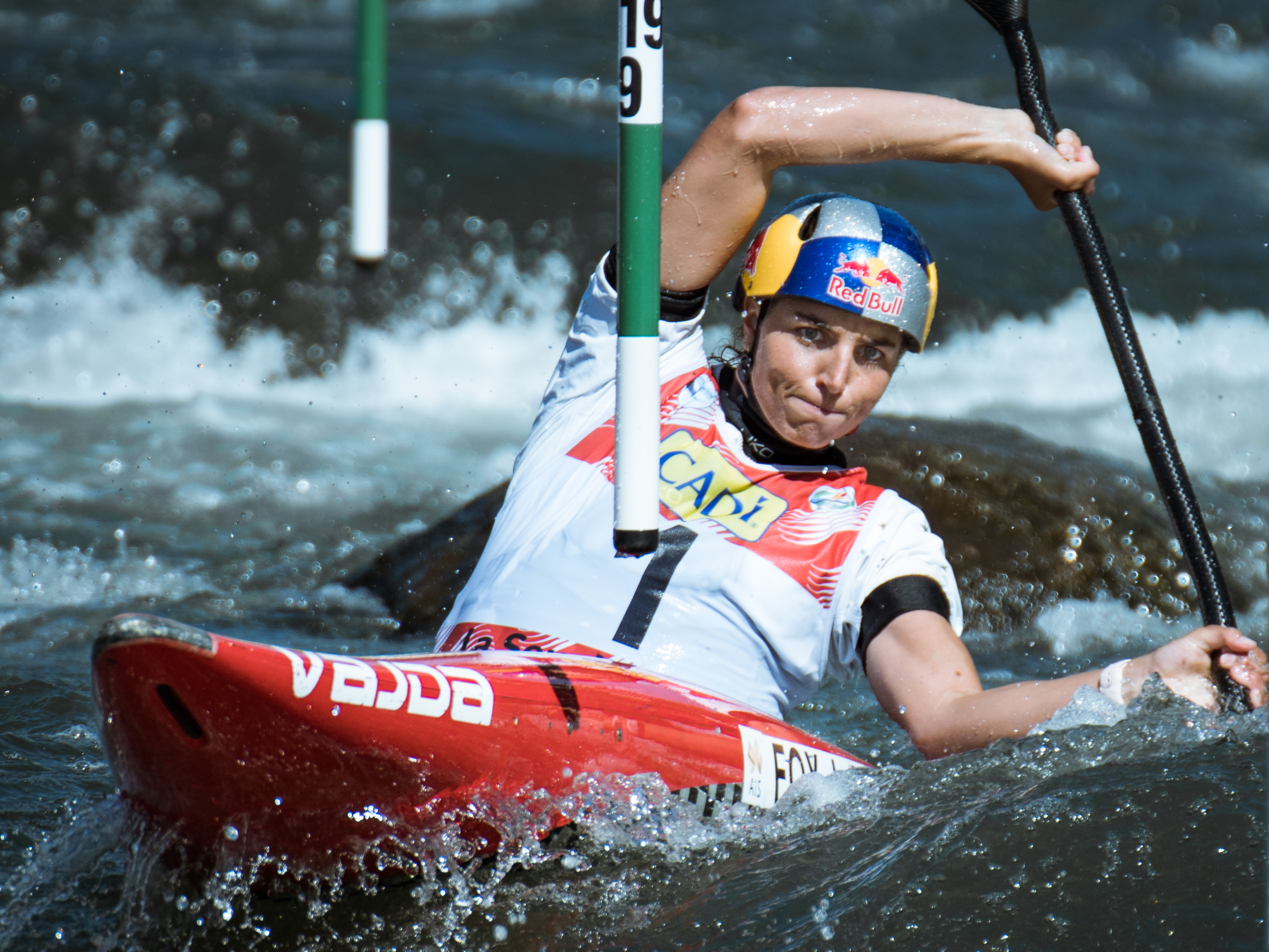
Jessica Fox in 2019

Fox races in K1, C1 and Kayak Cross events and is coached by her mother, Myriam. She started in the sport in 2005 by canoeing on the Nepean River. She has a scholarship and is affiliated with the Australian Institute of Sport and the New South Wales Institute of Sport. In club competitions, she represents the Penrith Valley Canoe Club.

=== 2009–2012: Rise through the ranks ===
In September 2009, Fox made her Australian senior national team bid. She competed at the 2009 ICF World Ranking in Merano, Italy, finishing third in the K1 event. At the 2009 AYOF event in Penrith, New South Wales, she finished first in the women's K1 event.

Fox placed 5th in the K1 event and won a bronze medal in the C1 event at the 2010 World Championships in Tacen. At the 2010 Summer Youth Olympics in Singapore, she won the gold in the girls' K1 slalom event. At the 2010 Junior World Championships in Foix, she won gold in K1, and won the inaugural C1 event at that level. She won her first World Cup by taking out the C1 event at the third round in La Seu d'Urgell. Domestically, Fox won the C1 event and placed 9th in the K1 event at the Oceania Continental Championships in Penrith (counting to World Cup points), and placed 1st and 3rd at the National Championships in Eildon, Victoria, in the C1 and K1 events, respectively.

In 2011, Fox won gold medals in the C1 event at World Cups 2 and 3. At the 2011 World Championships in Bratislava, Slovakia, she finished 19th, which gave Australia an automatic spot in the event at the 2012 Summer Olympics. She won silver medals at Australian Open and the Oceania Championships in the women's K1 event in 2011.

In 2012, Fox was selected to represent Australia for the first time at the Olympics in the women's K1 event, where she won the silver medal at the age of 18. Her pre-Olympic schedule included training on the Olympic course in London in April, and World Cup competitions in Wales, France and Spain, plus the Junior World Championship in the United States. Her result has been described as competitive revenge against the 44-year-old Czech paddler Štěpánka Hilgertová, who had beaten Fox's mother Myriam to the K1 gold medal sixteen years earlier in the 1996 Summer Olympics. Her silver medal improved on her mother's bronze from Atlanta 1996 and her father's fourth place in Barcelona 1992, and earned her the nickname "the Silver Fox" from teammates and the press.

=== 2013–2016: Ascendancy to the top ===
Fox won her first World Championship titles in the C1 event and the C1 team event at the 2013 World Championships in Prague.

At the 2014 World Championships at Deep Creek Lake, in the United States, Fox became the first athlete to win the C1 and K1 events at the same World Championships, besting Jana Dukátová, who became the first to do it at separate events winning a world championship title in K1 in 2006 and C1 in 2010.

At the 2016 Summer Olympics, Fox won her second Olympic medal, with a bronze in the K1 event in Rio de Janeiro, Brazil. After winning multiple World Cup races, she won the overall World Cup title in the Kayak Single Slalom (K1) and was second overall in Canoe Single Slalom (C1). She also won the U23 World Championships in K1 and C1 in Kraków, Poland. Additionally, she also won the Oceania Championships Slalom C1 in Penrith, Australia.

=== 2017–2020: Record breaking dominance ===
In 2017, Fox won the K1 event at the 2017 World Championships. Fox won the C1 and finished second in the K1 for the 2017 World Cup, and was awarded the Canoeist of the Year award, and the NSW Athlete of the Year award.

In 2018, Fox was a double ICF Canoe World Champion in both the C1 and K1 at the 2018 World Championships, and again won a number of World Cups in both disciplines, finishing first in both the C1 and K1 2018 World Cup standings. Her 2018 season featured an undefeated run in C1, sweeping all five World Cups and the World Championships, including three consecutive 'Golden Doubles' at the first three World Cups. In 2019, Fox repeated her World Cup dominance, again finishing first in both the K1 and C1 World Cup standings. Fox won the Oceania Championships in Canoe Slalom again, and won silver in both K1 and C1 events at the 2019 World Championships .

=== 2021–2023: Olympic heartbreak to glory ===
At the 2020 Tokyo Olympics, held in 2021 due to the COVID-19 pandemic, Fox finished third to win the bronze medal in the Women's K1. Fox's final run included a penalty time of 4 seconds, ultimately putting her final time 1.23 seconds behind the winner Ricarda Funk. During the event, Fox also gained media attention for using a condom to repair her kayak. Fox was also the fastest qualifier for the final of the inaugural women's C1 event at the Olympics, where she went on to win her first Olympic gold medal, beating silver medalist Mallory Franklin of Great Britain by more than three seconds with a penalty-free run.

At the 2021 World Championships in Bratislava, Fox did not progress to the final of either the K1 or C1 for the first time in her entire career, after incurring 50-second penalties in the semi-finals of both. On the final day of competition she became World Champion in the kayak cross, an 8th individual world title in a 3rd unique event, in just her third international appearance in the event.

=== 2024: Paris Olympics ===
Fox was selected as the opening ceremony flag bearer to represent Australia at the 2024 Summer Olympics in Paris, France. In her fourth Olympic Games, Fox was able to claim her first Olympic gold medal in the K1 event, having previously won one silver and two bronze medals in this event. Fox also managed to defend her C1 title. In doing so, Fox became the first paddler, male or female, to win and hold both K1 and C1 Olympic titles, and also became the most decorated athlete in canoe slalom at the Olympics. In the inaugural kayak cross event at the Olympics, Fox was eliminated in the heats, finishing 26th overall, in a race that featured her sister, Noemie Fox, who went on to win the gold medal.

== Awards and honours ==
Fox was the 2010 Penrith Press Junior Sports Star of the year and NewsLocal Medal winner.

She has also served as the ambassador for the Premier's Sporting Challenge.

In 2010, she was also named the Cumberland Courier Junior Sport Star, NSWIS Junior Athlete of the Year and the Pierre de Coubertin AOC award.

In 2009, 2010 and 2011, she was named the Junior Canoeist of the Year Australian Canoeing.

In 2011, she was named the Australian Canoeing Athlete of the Year.

She earned the AIS Secondary Education award in 2011.

She was awarded AIS Sport Performance Awards – Athlete of the Year for 2014.

From 2014 to 2019 she was named Maccabi World Union Australia's Outstanding Jewish Sportswoman.

In 2018, she won AIS Sport Performance Award Female Athlete of the Year.

In 2021, Fox was appointed member of the IOC Athletes' Commission. In 2024, she was elected to that committee.

In the 2022 Australia Day Honours Fox was awarded the Medal of the Order of Australia.

== Television ==
In 2017, Fox appeared as a celebrity contestant on the Australian version of Hell's Kitchen. She came 7th overall.

In August 2024, Fox filled in for Alex Cullen on the Nine Network's Today as a sport presenter.

== Career statistics ==
=== Major championships results timeline ===
Event		2009	2010	2011	2012	2013	2014	2015	2016	2017	2018	2019	2020	2021	2022	2023	2024	2025	2026
Olympic Games	C1	Not held												1	Not held		1	Not held	
Olympic Games	K1	Not held			2	Not held			3	Not held				3	Not held		1	Not held	
Olympic Games	Kayak cross	Not held															26	Not held	
World Championships	C1	3 (Note: Exhibition event)	3	8	Not held	1	1	1	Not held	6	1	2	Not held	26	2	3	Not held	—	14
World Championships	K1	—	5	19	Not held	18	1	4	Not held	1	1	2	Not held	25	2	1	Not held	—	1
World Championships	Kayak cross	Not held								—	—	—	Not held	1	1	37	Not held	—	13
World Championships	Kayak cross individual	Not held																—	1
World Championships	C1 team	Not held		1 (Note: Not a medal event due to low number of participating nations)	Not held	1	DNS	1	Not held	2	6	1	Not held	—	5	11	Not held	—	—
World Championships	K1 team	—	11	11	Not held	4	11	7	Not held	3	7	16	Not held	—	13	1	Not held	—	1

=== World Cup individual podiums ===
	1st place, gold medalist(s)	2nd place, silver medalist(s)	3rd place, bronze medalist(s)	Total
C1	37	9	3	49
K1	20	12	3	35
Kayak cross	2	0	3	5
Kayak cross individual	1	0	1	2
Total	60	21	10	91

Season	Date	Venue	Position	Event
2010	21 February 2010	Penrith	1st	C1^{1}
2010	27 June 2010	La Seu d'Urgell	1st	C1
2011	2 July 2011	L'Argentière-la-Bessée	1st	C1
2011	9 July 2011	Markkleeberg	1st	C1
2012	9 June 2012	Cardiff	2nd	C1
2013	22 June 2013	Cardiff	2nd	C1
2013	29 June 2013	Augsburg	1st	C1
2013	6 July 2013	La Seu d'Urgell	1st	C1
2013	17 August 2013	Tacen	1st	C1
2013	18 August 2013	Tacen	1st	K1
2013	24 August 2013	Bratislava	1st	C1
2014	8 June 2014	Lee Valley	3rd	K1
2014	14 June 2014	Tacen	1st	C1
2014	2 August 2014	La Seu d'Urgell	1st	C1
2015	20 June 2015	Prague	2nd	C1
2015	21 June 2015	Prague	2nd	K1
2015	27 June 2015	Kraków	1st	C1
2015	8 August 2015	La Seu d'Urgell	1st	C1
2015	15 August 2015	Pau	2nd	C1
2015	16 August 2015	Pau	2nd	K1
2016	4 June 2016	Ivrea	1st	C1
2016	5 June 2016	Ivrea	2nd	K1
2016	12 June 2016	La Seu d'Urgell	2nd	K1
2016	18 June 2016	Pau	2nd	C1
2016	3 September 2016	Prague	1st	C1
2016	10 September 2016	Tacen	2nd	C1
2016	11 September 2016	Tacen	1st	K1
2017	24 June 2017	Augsburg	1st	C1
2017	1 July 2017	Markkleeberg	1st	C1
2017	2 July 2017	Markkleeberg	2nd	K1
2017	2 September 2017	Ivrea	1st	C1
2017	3 September 2017	Ivrea	2nd	K1
2017	9 September 2017	La Seu d'Urgell	2nd	C1
2017	10 September 2017	La Seu d'Urgell	2nd	K1
2018	23 June 2018	Liptovský Mikuláš	1st	K1
2018	24 June 2018	Liptovský Mikuláš	1st	C1
2018	30 June 2018	Kraków	1st	K1
2018	1 July 2018	Kraków	1st	C1
2018	7 July 2018	Augsburg	1st	K1
2018	8 July 2018	Augsburg	1st	C1
2018	31 August 2018	Tacen	1st	C1
2018	1 September 2018	Tacen	2nd	K1
2018	9 September 2018	La Seu d'Urgell	1st	C1
2019	15 June 2019	Lee Valley	3rd	K1
2019	16 June 2019	Lee Valley	3rd	C1
2019	30 June 2019	Tacen	1st	C1
2019	31 August 2019	Markkleeberg	2nd	K1
2019	1 September 2019	Markkleeberg	3rd	C1
2019	7 September 2019	Prague	1st	K1
2019	8 September 2019	Prague	1st	C1
2021	12 June 2021	Prague	3rd	K1
2021	13 June 2021	Prague	1st	C1
2021	19 June 2021	Markkleeberg	1st	K1
2021	4 September 2021	La Seu d'Urgell	1st	K1
2021	5 September 2021	La Seu d'Urgell	1st	C1
2021	11 September 2021	Pau	1st	K1
2021	12 September 2021	Pau	2nd	C1
2021	12 September 2021	Pau	3rd	Kayak cross
2022	11 June 2022	Prague	1st	K1
2022	18 June 2022	Kraków	1st	K1
2022	25 June 2022	Tacen	1st	K1
2022	27 August 2022	Pau	1st	K1
2022	28 August 2022	Pau	3rd	C1
2022	28 August 2022	Pau	1st	Kayak cross
2023	3 June 2023	Augsburg	1st	C1
2023	9 June 2023	Prague	1st	K1
2023	10 June 2023	Prague	1st	C1
2023	17 June 2023	Tacen	1st	K1
2023	18 June 2023	Tacen	3rd	Kayak cross
2023	1 September 2023	La Seu d'Urgell	1st	C1
2023	2 September 2023	La Seu d'Urgell	2nd	K1
2023	6 October 2023	Vaires-sur-Marne	1st	K1
2023	7 October 2023	Vaires-sur-Marne	1st	C1
2023	8 October 2023	Vaires-sur-Marne	3rd	Kayak cross
2024	1 June 2024	Augsburg	1st	C1
2024	7 June 2024	Prague	2nd	K1
2024	8 June 2024	Prague	2nd	C1
2024	14 June 2024	Kraków	1st	K1
2024	15 June 2024	Kraków	1st	C1
2024	16 June 2024	Kraków	1st	Kayak cross
2024	21 September 2024	La Seu d'Urgell	1st	C1
2025	7 June 2025	La Seu d'Urgell	1st	C1
2025	14 June 2025	Pau	1st	C1
2025	15 June 2025	Pau	3rd	Kayak cross individual
2025	29 June 2025	Prague	1st	Kayak cross individual
2026	29 May 2026	Tacen	2nd	K1
2026	5 June 2026	Prague	1st	K1
2026	6 June 2026	Prague	1st	C1
2026	13 June 2026	Augsburg	1st	C1
2026	3 September 2026	Vaires-sur-Marne	1st	K1
2026	11 September 2026	La Seu d'Urgell	1st	K1

^{1} Oceania Canoe Slalom Open counting for World Cup points

=== Complete World Cup results ===
Year	Class	WC1	WC2	WC3	WC4	WC5	Points	Position
2008	K1	Continent (Australia); 11	Prague (Czech Republic)	Tacen (Slovenia)	Augsburg (Germany)		32	70th
2010	K1	Continent (Australia); 9	Prague (Czech Republic); 31	La Seu (Spain); 14	Augsburg (Germany)		67	25th
2010	C1	1	7	1	Augsburg (Germany)		156	5th
2011	K1	Tacen (Slovenia)	L'Argentière (France); 7	Markkleeberg (Germany); 17	Prague (Czech Republic)		66	21st
2011	C1	Tacen (Slovenia)	1	1	Prague (Czech Republic)		120	6th
2012	K1	Cardiff (United Kingdom); 7	Pau (France); 8	La Seu (Spain); 6	Prague (Czech Republic)	Bratislava (Slovakia)	120	14th
2012	C1	2			Prague (Czech Republic)	Bratislava (Slovakia)	55	19th
2013	K1	Cardiff (United Kingdom); 5	Augsburg (Germany); 12	La Seu (Spain); 10	Tacen (Slovenia); 1	Bratislava (Slovakia); 9	205	2nd
2013	C1	2	1	1	1	1	295	1st
2014	K1	Lee Valley (United Kingdom); 3	Tacen (Slovenia); 9	Prague (Czech Republic); 5	La Seu (Spain); 9	Augsburg (Germany)	166	9th
2014	C1	4	1	8	1	Augsburg (Germany)	198	4th
2015	K1	Prague (Czech Republic); 2	Kraków (Poland); 29	Liptovský Mikuláš (Slovakia); 9	La Seu (Spain); 5	Pau (France); 2	252	3rd
2015	C1	2	1	8	1	2	318	1st
2016	K1	Ivrea (Italy); 2	La Seu (Spain); 2	Pau (France); 10	Prague (Czech Republic); 17	Tacen (Slovenia); 1	290	2nd
2016	C1	1		2	1	2	285	3rd
2017	K1	Prague (Czech Republic); 10	Augsburg (Germany); 11	Markkleeberg (Germany); 2	Ivrea (Italy); 2	La Seu (Spain); 2	286	2nd
2017	C1	24	1	1	1	2	307	1st
2018	K1	Liptovský Mikuláš (Slovakia); 1	Kraków (Poland); 1	Augsburg (Germany); 1	Tacen (Slovenia); 2	La Seu (Spain); 10	303	1st
2018	C1	1	1	1	1	1	360	1st
2019	K1	Lee Valley (United Kingdom); 3	Bratislava (Slovakia); 6	Tacen (Slovenia); 27	Markkleeberg (Germany); 2	Prague (Czech Republic); 1	278	1st
2019	C1	3	11	1	3	1	312	1st
2021	K1	Prague (Czech Republic); 3	Markkleeberg (Germany); 1	La Seu (Spain); 1	Pau (France); 1		290	1st
2021	C1	1	4	1	2		276	2nd
2021	Kayak cross			8	3		125	4th
2022	K1	Prague (Czech Republic); 1	Kraków (Poland); 1	Tacen (Slovenia); 1	Pau (France); 1	La Seu (Spain); 11	304	1st
2022	C1	24	5	12	3	10	210	6th
2022	Kayak cross	10	14	DNS	1	DNS	86	12th
2023	K1	Augsburg (Germany); 26	Prague (Czech Republic); 1	Tacen (Slovenia); 1	La Seu (Spain); 2	Paris (France); 1	308	1st
2023	C1	1	1	10	1	1	334	1st
2023	Kayak cross	DNS	5	3	18	3	194	3rd

== See also ==
- List of select Jewish canoeists
- List of Jewish Olympic medalists
- List of Youth Olympic Games gold medalists who won Olympic gold medals
- List of flag bearers for Australia at the Olympics

Olympic Games
Preceded by Cate Campbell (with Patty Mills)	Flagbearer for Australia (with Eddie Ockenden); Paris 2024	Succeeded by Incumbent
