= Canoe slalom at the 2023 European Games – Women's C1 team =

Women's canoe team at the 2023 European Games
- Venue: Kraków-Kolna Canoe Slalom Course
- Date: 30 June
- Competitors: 27 from 9 nations
- Teams: 9

Medalists
gold medal	Gabriela Satková; Tereza Fišerová; Tereza Kneblová	Czech Republic
silver medal	Mallory Franklin; Kimberley Woods; Sophie Ogilvie	Great Britain
bronze medal	Andrea Herzog; Nele Bayn; Elena Lilik	Germany

The canoe slalom women's canoe team event at the 2023 European Games took place on 30 June 2023 at the Kraków-Kolna Canoe Slalom Course in Kraków.

== Competition format ==
Team events use a single run format with the team with the fastest time including penalties awarded gold. Teams consist of three paddlers from the same country.

Penalties are accumulated for each athlete, such that a team can incur a total of 150 seconds of penalties on a single gate (if all three miss it) or 6 seconds (if all three touch it). The time begins when the first paddler crosses the start beam and ends when the last one crosses the finish beam. All three paddlers must cross the finish line within 15 seconds of each other or else incur an additional 50-second penalty.

Team events are generally contested on the same gate setup as the qualification heats of the individual events.

== Results ==
Rank	Bib	Country	Athletes	Result		
Rank	Bib	Country	Athletes	Time	Pen	Total
1st place, gold medalist(s)	3	Czechia	Gabriela Satková; Tereza Fišerová; Tereza Kneblová	115.54	2	117.54
2nd place, silver medalist(s)	4	Great Britain	Mallory Franklin; Kimberley Woods; Sophie Ogilvie	116.34	4	120.34
3rd place, bronze medalist(s)	5	Germany	Andrea Herzog; Nele Bayn; Elena Lilik	119.60	2	121.60
4	7	Spain	Miren Lazkano; Núria Vilarrubla; Ainhoa Lameiro	118.44	4	122.44
5	6	Slovenia	Alja Kozorog; Lea Novak; Eva Alina Hočevar	124.62	4	128.62
6	1	Slovakia	Soňa Stanovská; Zuzana Paňková; Emanuela Luknárová	124.02	8	132.02
7	2	France	Marjorie Delassus; Angèle Hug; Lucie Prioux	121.22	14	135.22
8	8	Poland	Klaudia Zwolińska; Aleksandra Stach; Katarzyna Liber	127.39	10	137.39
9	9	Italy	Marta Bertoncelli; Elena Borghi; Elena Micozzi	122.27	50	172.27
