= Elena Lilik =

German canoeist (born 1998)

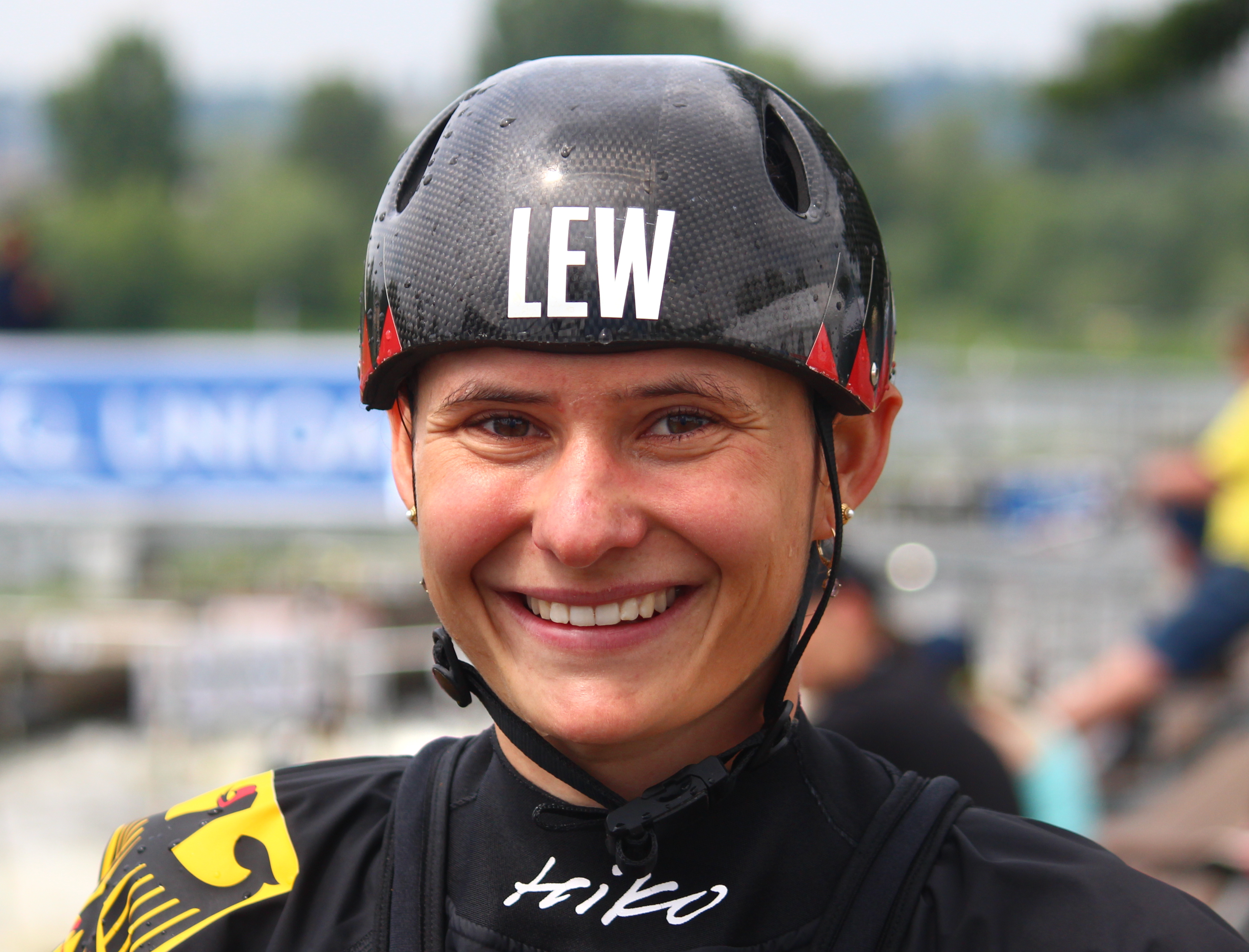
- Lilik in 2023

Personal information
- Nationality: German
- Born: 14 September 1998 (age 28) Weimar, Thuringia, Germany
- Height: 1.65 m (5 ft 5 in)
- Weight: 53 kg (117 lb)

Sport
- Country: Germany
- Sport: Canoe slalom
- Event: C1, K1, Kayak cross
- Club: Kanu Schwaben Augsburg
- Coached by: Sören Kaufmann
Medal record
Women's canoe slalom
Representing Germany
Olympic Games
Silver medal – second place	2024 Paris	C1
World Championships
Gold medal – first place	2021 Bratislava	C1
Gold medal – first place	2022 Augsburg	K1 team
Silver medal – second place	2021 Bratislava	K1
Silver medal – second place	2021 Bratislava	Kayak cross
Silver medal – second place	2022 Augsburg	C1 team
Silver medal – second place	2025 Penrith	C1 team
Silver medal – second place	2025 Penrith	K1 team
Bronze medal – third place	2022 Augsburg	K1
European Games
Gold medal – first place	2023 Kraków	C1
Bronze medal – third place	2023 Kraków	C1 team
Bronze medal – third place	2023 Kraków	K1 team
European Championships
Silver medal – second place	2019 Pau	K1 team
Silver medal – second place	2019 Pau	C1 team
Bronze medal – third place	2018 Prague	C1
Bronze medal – third place	2021 Ivrea	C1
U23 World Championships
Bronze medal – third place	2021 Tacen	C1
Bronze medal – third place	2021 Tacen	K1 team
U23 European Championships
Gold medal – first place	2020 Kraków	C1
Gold medal – first place	2020 Kraków	K1
Silver medal – second place	2020 Kraków	C1 team
Silver medal – second place	2020 Kraków	K1 team
Junior World Championships
Silver medal – second place	2015 Foz do Iguaçu	K1
Silver medal – second place	2015 Foz do Iguaçu	K1 team
Junior European Championships
Silver medal – second place	2014 Skopje	C1 team

Elena Lilik (née Apel, born 14 September 1998) is a German slalom canoeist who has competed at the international level since 2014.

She is an Olympic silver medalist and world champion in the C1 event.

== Career ==
Lilik won a silver medal in the C1 event at the 2024 Summer Olympics in Paris. She also finished 4th in the kayak cross at the same games.

She won eight medals at the ICF Canoe Slalom World Championships with two golds (C1: 2021, K1 team: 2022), five silvers (K1: 2021, Kayak cross: 2021, C1 team: 2022, 2025, K1 team: 2025) and one bronze (K1: 2022).

Lilik has won seven medals (1–2–4) at the European Championships including two silver medals in the C1 team and K1 team events at the 2019 European Championships in Pau, France, two bronze medals in the C1 event in 2018 and 2021 and a gold and two bronze medals at the 2023 European Games in Kraków.

She also achieved success in her junior career, winning a silver medal in the K1 event 2015 Junior World Championships in Foz do Iguaçu.

== Personal life ==
Lilik is from Weimar, Germany but resides in Augsburg, home of the Augsburg Eiskanal.

Her younger sister Emily Apel is also a slalom canoeist and her father Thomas Apel is a coach of the German national team.

== Results ==
=== World Cup individual podiums ===
	1st place, gold medalist(s)	2nd place, silver medalist(s)	3rd place, bronze medalist(s)	Total
C1	2	1	3	6
K1	1	2	2	5
Kayak cross	1	1	0	2
Total	4	4	5	13

Season	Date	Venue	Position	Event
2021	19 June 2021	Markkleeberg	3rd	K1
2021	12 September 2021	Pau	3rd	C1
2022	11 June 2022	Prague	2nd	K1
2022	12 June 2022	Prague	2nd	C1
2022	26 June 2022	Tacen	3rd	C1
2022	4 September 2022	La Seu d'Urgell	2nd	Kayak cross
2023	2 June 2023	Augsburg	1st	K1
2023	3 June 2023	Augsburg	3rd	C1
2023	16 June 2023	Tacen	1st	C1
2023	17 June 2023	Tacen	3rd	K1
2023	3 September 2023	La Seu d'Urgell	1st	Kayak cross
2025	30 August 2025	Tacen	1st	C1
2025	5 September 2025	Augsburg	2nd	K1

=== Complete World Cup results ===
Year	Class	WC1	WC2	WC3	WC4	WC5	Points	Position
2014	C1	Lee Valley (United Kingdom)	Tacen (Slovenia)	Prague (Czech Republic)	La Seu (Spain)	Augsburg (Germany); 12	42	27th
2017	C1	Prague (Czech Republic); 18	Augsburg (Germany); 42	Markkleeberg (Germany)	Ivrea (Italy)	La Seu (Spain)	27	45th
2018	C1	Liptovský Mikuláš (Slovakia); 48	Kraków (Poland)	Augsburg (Germany); 5	Tacen (Slovenia)	La Seu (Spain); 54	48	35th
2018	K1	39	Kraków (Poland)		Tacen (Slovenia)		2	88th
2018	C2Mx		Kraków (Poland)	4	Tacen (Slovenia)		45	16th
2019	C1	Lee Valley (United Kingdom); 21	Bratislava (Slovakia); 29	Tacen (Slovenia)	Markkleeberg (Germany); 28	Prague (Czech Republic)	38	44th
2019	K1	12	41	Tacen (Slovenia)	14	Prague (Czech Republic)	62	31st
2021	C1	Prague (Czech Republic); 9	Markkleeberg (Germany); 10	La Seu (Spain); 24	Pau (France); 3		187	3rd
2021	K1	7	3	6	14		190	4th
