= Mallory Franklin =

British slalom canoeist (born 1994)

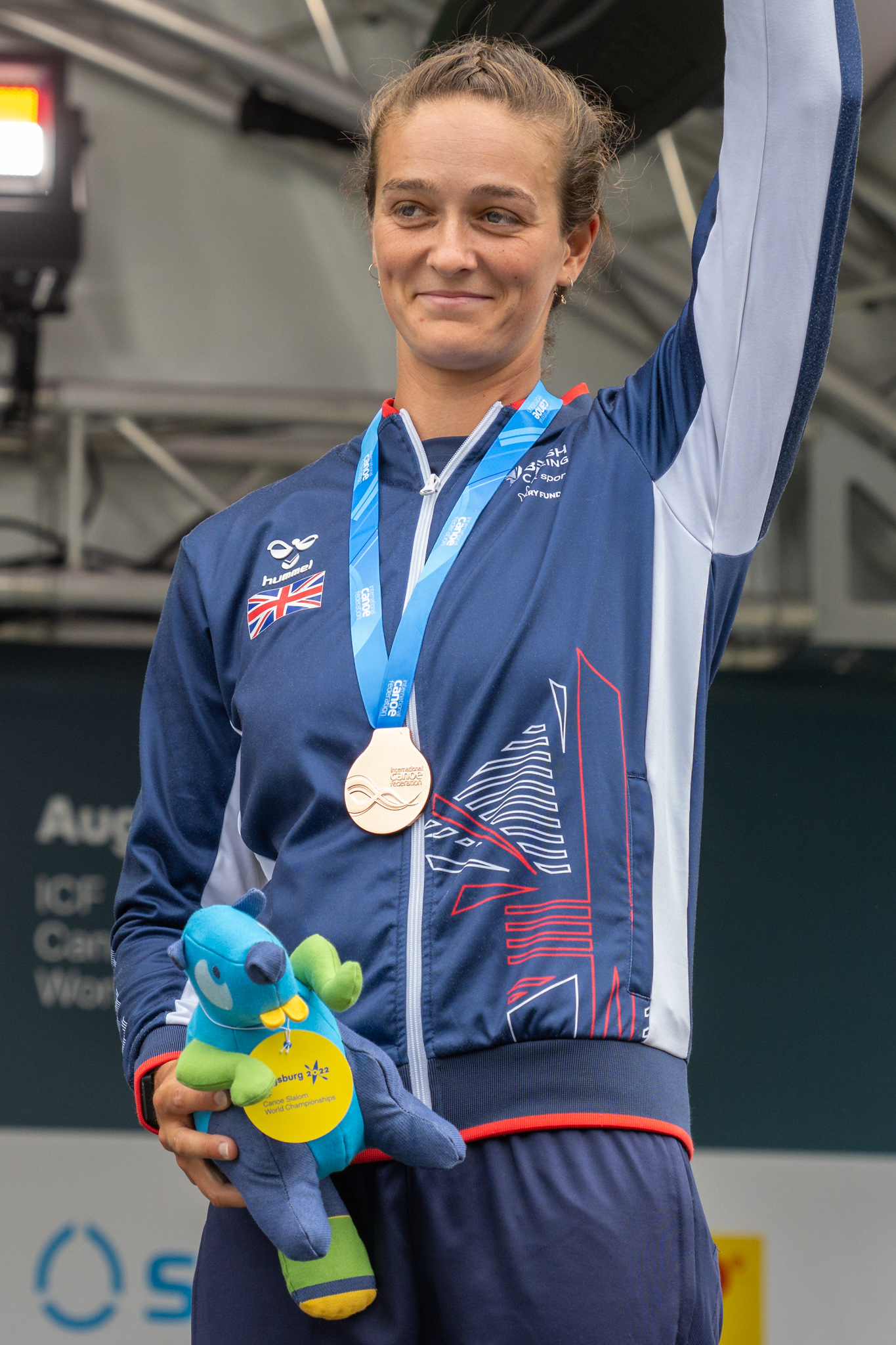
- Franklin in 2022

Personal information
- Full name: Mallory Shannon Franklin
- Nationality: British
- Born: 19 June 1994 (age 32) Windsor, Berkshire, England
- Height: 1.79 m (5 ft 10 in)
- Weight: 69 kg (152 lb)

Sport
- Country: Great Britain
- Sport: Canoe slalom
- Event: C1, K1, Kayak cross
- Club: Windsor and District Canoe Club
Medal record
Women's canoe slalom
Representing Great Britain
Olympic Games
Silver medal – second place	2020 Tokyo	C1
World Championships
Gold medal – first place	2017 Pau	C1
Gold medal – first place	2017 Pau	C1 team
Gold medal – first place	2018 Rio de Janeiro	C1 team
Gold medal – first place	2019 La Seu d'Urgell	K1 team
Gold medal – first place	2021 Bratislava	K1 team
Gold medal – first place	2023 London	C1
Gold medal – first place	2023 London	C1 team
Silver medal – second place	2013 Prague	C1
Silver medal – second place	2014 Deep Creek Lake	C1
Silver medal – second place	2018 Rio de Janeiro	C1
Silver medal – second place	2018 Rio de Janeiro	K1
Silver medal – second place	2021 Bratislava	C1
Bronze medal – third place	2018 Rio de Janeiro	K1 team
Bronze medal – third place	2022 Augsburg	C1
Bronze medal – third place	2022 Augsburg	C1 team
Bronze medal – third place	2023 London	K1 team
European Games
Silver medal – second place	2023 Kraków	C1 team
Bronze medal – third place	2023 Kraków	C1
European Championships
Gold medal – first place	2016 Liptovský Mikuláš	C1 team
Gold medal – first place	2017 Tacen	C1 team
Gold medal – first place	2018 Prague	C1 team
Gold medal – first place	2019 Pau	C1
Gold medal – first place	2019 Pau	C1 team
Gold medal – first place	2021 Ivrea	K1 team
Gold medal – first place	2022 Liptovský Mikuláš	C1
Gold medal – first place	2026 Ivrea	C1
Silver medal – second place	2012 Augsburg	C1
Silver medal – second place	2015 Markkleeberg	C1
Silver medal – second place	2018 Prague	C1
Silver medal – second place	2019 Pau	K1
Silver medal – second place	2021 Ivrea	C1 team
Silver medal – second place	2022 Liptovský Mikuláš	K1 team
Silver medal – second place	2022 Liptovský Mikuláš	Kayak cross
Silver medal – second place	2026 Ivrea	Kayak cross
Bronze medal – third place	2015 Markkleeberg	C1 team
Bronze medal – third place	2016 Liptovský Mikuláš	C1
Bronze medal – third place	2022 Liptovský Mikuláš	K1
Bronze medal – third place	2024 Tacen	K1
Bronze medal – third place	2024 Tacen	C1 team
Bronze medal – third place	2026 Ivrea	C1 team
U23 World Championships
Gold medal – first place	2013 Liptovský Mikuláš	C1 team
Gold medal – first place	2014 Penrith	K1 team
Gold medal – first place	2017 Bratislava	C1
Gold medal – first place	2017 Bratislava	C1 team
Silver medal – second place	2015 Foz do Iguaçu	C1
Silver medal – second place	2017 Bratislava	K1 team
Bronze medal – third place	2012 Wausau	C1 team
Bronze medal – third place	2015 Foz do Iguaçu	C1 team
U23 European Championships
Gold medal – first place	2013 Bourg-Saint-Maurice	C1
Gold medal – first place	2014 Skopje	C1
Gold medal – first place	2014 Skopje	C1 team
Gold medal – first place	2015 Kraków	C1 team
Silver medal – second place	2015 Kraków	K1 team
Bronze medal – third place	2012 Solkan	C1 team
Junior World Championships
Gold medal – first place	2012 Wausau	K1 team
Silver medal – second place	2012 Wausau	C1
Junior European Championships
Silver medal – second place	2010 Markkleeberg	C1
Silver medal – second place	2012 Solkan	C1
Bronze medal – third place	2011 Banja Luka	K1 team

Mallory Shannon Franklin (born 19 June 1994) is a British slalom canoeist who has competed internationally since 2010. She competes in both Kayak (K1/seated double-blade paddle) and Canadian Canoe (C1/kneeling single-blade paddle) classes, as well as the Kayak cross discipline.

== Career ==
Franklin is a two-time Olympian. She won a silver medal at the delayed 2020 Summer Olympics in Tokyo in the C1 event. At the 2024 Summer Olympics, Franklin finished 12th in the C1 final and 13th in kayak cross after being eliminated in the quarter-finals due to a fault in the roll zone.

Franklin has won 16 medals in total at the ICF Canoe Slalom World Championships with seven golds (C1: 2017, 2023, C1 team: 2017, 2018, 2023, K1 team: 2019, 2021), five silvers (C1: 2013, 2014, 2018, 2021; K1: 2018) and four bronzes (C1: 2022, K1 team: 2018, 2023, C1 team: 2022).

She has also won 24 medals at the European Championships (8 golds, 9 silvers and 7 bronzes), including a silver and a bronze at the 2023 European Games in Kraków.

Franklin won the overall World Cup title in the C1 class in 2016 and in the Kayak cross in 2022.

== Early life and education ==
Franklin graduated from the University of Bedfordshire in 2016 with a Bachelor of Science (BSc) in Sports Therapy.

== Results ==
=== World Cup individual podiums ===
	1st place, gold medalist(s)	2nd place, silver medalist(s)	3rd place, bronze medalist(s)	Total
C1	7	8	6	21
K1	1	3	2	6
Kayak cross	3	0	1	4
Total	11	11	9	31

Season	Date	Venue	Position	Event
2012	9 June 2012	Cardiff	3rd	C1
2012	25 August 2012	Prague	2nd	C1
2013	22 June 2013	Cardiff	3rd	C1
2013	29 June 2013	Augsburg	2nd	C1
2013	17 August 2013	Tacen	2nd	C1
2014	7 June 2014	Lee Valley	1st	C1
2014	16 August 2014	Augsburg	1st	C1
2015	4 July 2015	Liptovský Mikuláš	1st	C1
2016	4 June 2016	Ivrea	2nd	C1
2016	18 June 2016	Pau	1st	C1
2016	3 September 2016	Prague	3rd	C1
2016	10 September 2016	Tacen	3rd	C1
2017	17 June 2017	Prague	2nd	C1
2017	24 June 2017	Augsburg	2nd	C1
2018	24 June 2018	Liptovský Mikuláš	3rd	C1
2018	7 July 2018	Augsburg	2nd	K1
2018	8 July 2018	Augsburg	2nd	C1
2018	8 September 2018	La Seu d'Urgell	3rd	K1
2018	9 September 2018	La Seu d'Urgell	2nd	C1
2019	15 June 2019	Lee Valley	1st	K1
2019	16 June 2019	Lee Valley	1st	C1
2021	4 September 2021	La Seu d'Urgell	2nd	K1
2022	12 June 2022	Prague	3rd	Kayak cross
2022	19 June 2022	Kraków	1st	C1
2022	25 June 2022	Tacen	2nd	K1
2022	26 June 2022	Tacen	1st	C1
2022	4 September 2022	La Seu d'Urgell	1st	Kayak cross
2023	9 June 2023	Prague	3rd	K1
2023	7 October 2023	Vaires-sur-Marne	3rd	C1
2024	15 September 2024	Ivrea	1st	Kayak cross
2024	22 September 2024	La Seu d'Urgell	1st	Kayak cross

=== Complete World Cup results ===
Year	Class	WC1	WC2	WC3	WC4	WC5	Points	Position
2010	C1	Continent	Prague (Czech Republic); 8	La Seu (Spain); 15	Augsburg (Germany); 9		78	9th
2011	C1	Tacen (Slovenia); 4	L'Argentière (France); 9	Markkleeberg (Germany)	Prague (Czech Republic); 5		117	7th
2011	K1	26	43	Markkleeberg (Germany)			15	55th
2012	C1	Cardiff (United Kingdom); 3	Pau (France)	La Seu (Spain)	Prague (Czech Republic); 2	Bratislava (Slovakia)	105	9th
2013	C1	Cardiff (United Kingdom); 3	Augsburg (Germany); 2	La Seu (Spain)	Tacen (Slovenia); 2	Bratislava (Slovakia)	160	5th
2013	K1		29	La Seu (Spain)	23	Bratislava (Slovakia)	26	49th
2014	C1	Lee Valley (United Kingdom); 1	Tacen (Slovenia); 6	Prague (Czech Republic)	La Seu (Spain); 5	Augsburg (Germany); 1	261	3rd
2014	K1	21	21	Prague (Czech Republic)	18	34	73	31st
2015	C1	Prague (Czech Republic)	Kraków (Poland); 15	Liptovský Mikuláš (Slovakia); 1	La Seu (Spain)	Pau (France)	75	21st
2016	C1	Ivrea (Italy); 2	La Seu (Spain); 5	Pau (France); 1	Prague (Czech Republic); 3	Tacen (Slovenia); 3	307	1st
2016	K1	11		34			34	45th
2017	C1	Prague (Czech Republic); 2	Augsburg (Germany); 2	Markkleeberg (Germany); 20	Ivrea (Italy)	La Seu (Spain); 6	217	5th
2017	K1	4	4	16	Ivrea (Italy)	21	163	10th
2018	C1	Liptovský Mikuláš (Slovakia); 3	Kraków (Poland); 15	Augsburg (Germany); 2	Tacen (Slovenia)	La Seu (Spain); 2	243	2nd
2018	K1	10	25	2	Tacen (Slovenia)	3	204	5th
2019	C1	Lee Valley (United Kingdom); 1	Bratislava (Slovakia)	Tacen (Slovenia)	Markkleeberg (Germany)	Prague (Czech Republic); 15	116	18th
2019	K1	1	Bratislava (Slovakia)	Tacen (Slovenia)	Markkleeberg (Germany)	6	144	14th
2021	C1	Prague (Czech Republic); 4	Markkleeberg (Germany); 7	La Seu (Spain); 4	Pau (France)		132	12th
2021	K1	30	30	2	Pau (France)		65	28th
