= Andrea Herzog =

German canoeist (born 1999)

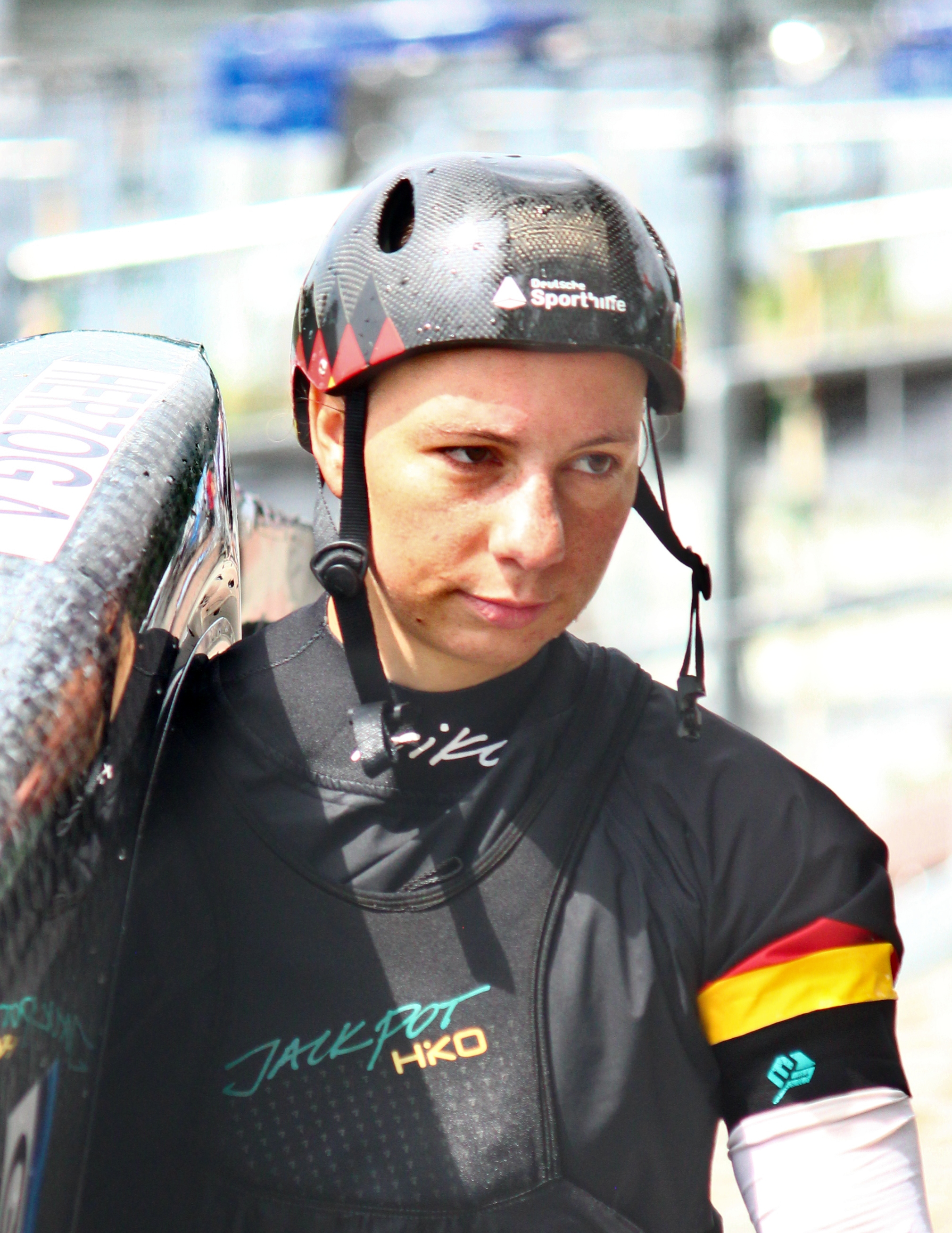
- Herzog in 2023

Personal information
- Nationality: German
- Born: 9 December 1999 (age 26) Meissen, Germany

Sport
- Country: Germany
- Sport: Canoe slalom
- Event: C1, K1, Kayak cross
- Club: LKC Leipzig
Medal record
Women's canoe slalom
Representing Germany
Olympic Games
Bronze medal – third place	2020 Tokyo	C1
World Championships
Gold medal – first place	2019 La Seu d'Urgell	C1
Gold medal – first place	2022 Augsburg	C1
Silver medal – second place	2022 Augsburg	C1 team
Silver medal – second place	2025 Penrith	C1 team
European Games
Bronze medal – third place	2023 Kraków	C1 team
European Championships
Gold medal – first place	2024 Tacen	C1
Silver medal – second place	2017 Tacen	C1 team
Silver medal – second place	2019 Pau	C1 team
Bronze medal – third place	2016 Liptovský Mikuláš	C1 team
U23 European Championships
Silver medal – second place	2014 Skopje	C1 team
Silver medal – second place	2020 Kraków	C1 team
Bronze medal – third place	2020 Kraków	C1
Junior World Championships
Gold medal – first place	2015 Foz do Iguaçu	C1
Gold medal – first place	2017 Bratislava	C1
Gold medal – first place	2017 Bratislava	C1 team
Gold medal – first place	2017 Bratislava	K1 team
Silver medal – second place	2015 Foz do Iguaçu	K1 team
Silver medal – second place	2016 Kraków	C1
Junior European Championships
Silver medal – second place	2014 Skopje	K1 team

Andrea Herzog (born 9 December 1999) is a German slalom canoeist who has competed at the international level since 2014.

== Career ==
She won four medals at the ICF Canoe Slalom World Championships with two golds in C1 (2019, 2022) and two silvers in C1 team (2022, 2025). She has also won five medals (1 gold, 2 silvers and 2 bronzes) at the European Championships, including a bronze in the C1 team event at the 2023 European Games in Kraków.

At the delayed 2020 Summer Olympics in Tokyo, Herzog won a bronze medal in the C1 event.

Herzog won three consecutive Junior World Championships medals in the C1 event with two golds (2015, 2017) and one silver (2016).

== Results ==
=== World Cup individual podiums ===
Season	Date	Venue	Position	Event
2021	13 June 2021	Prague	2nd	C1
2021	20 Jun 2021	Markkleeberg	1st	C1
2022	4 September 2022	La Seu d'Urgell	1st	C1
2023	1 September 2023	La Seu d'Urgell	2nd	C1
2024	8 June 2024	Prague	3rd	C1
2025	28 June 2025	Prague	3rd	C1
2025	31 August 2025	Tacen	1st	Kayak cross

=== Complete World Cup results ===
Year	Class	WC1	WC2	WC3	WC4	WC5	Points	Position
2017	C1	Prague (Czech Republic)	Augsburg (Germany)	Markkleeberg (Germany); 12	Ivrea (Italy); 8	La Seu (Spain); 14	127	17th
2018	C1	Liptovský Mikuláš (Slovakia); 5	Kraków (Poland); 28	Augsburg (Germany); 10	Tacen (Slovenia); 15	La Seu (Spain); 4	207	5th
2018	K1	37					2	85th
2019	C1	Lee Valley (United Kingdom); 5	Bratislava (Slovakia); 5	Tacen (Slovenia)	Markkleeberg (Germany); 4	Prague (Czech Republic)	134	13th
2021	C1	Prague (Czech Republic); 2	Markkleeberg (Germany); 1	La Seu (Spain)	Pau (France)		115	17th
