= Sophie Ogilvie =

British slalom canoeist (born 1999)

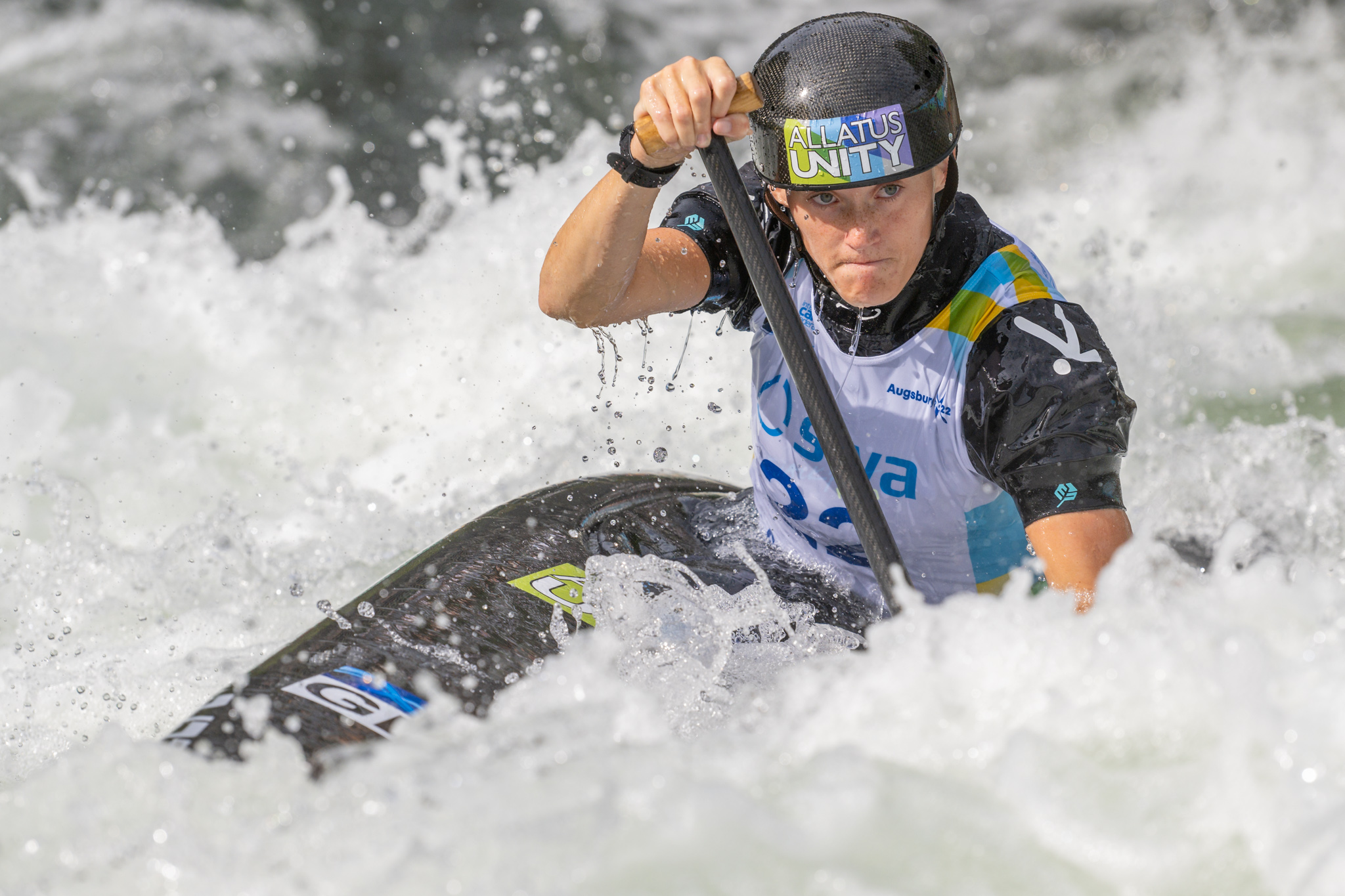
- Sophie Ogilvie performing at 2022 ICF Canoe Slalom World Championships in Augsburg, Germany

Personal information
- Nationality: Scottish
- Born: 8 August 1999 (age 26) Stirling, Scotland

Sport
- Country: Great Britain
- Sport: Canoe slalom
- Event: C1, K1
Medal record
Women's canoe slalom
Representing Great Britain
World Championships
Bronze medal – third place	2022 Augsburg	C1 team
European Games
Silver medal – second place	2023 Kraków	C1 team
European Championships
Gold medal – first place	2019 Pau	C1 team
Silver medal – second place	2021 Ivrea	C1 team
U23 World Championships
Bronze medal – third place	2018 Ivrea	K1 team
Bronze medal – third place	2022 Ivrea	C1 team
U23 European Championships
Silver medal – second place	2018 Bratislava	K1 team
Bronze medal – third place	2022 České Budějovice	C1 team

Sophie Ogilvie (born 8 August 1999) is a British slalom canoeist who has competed at the international level since 2014.

She won a bronze medal in the C1 team event at the 2022 World Championships in Augsburg. She also won a gold and two silver medals in the same event at the European Championships, including a silver at the 2023 European Games in Kraków.
