= 2021 ICF Canoe Slalom World Championships =

Canoe slalom event in Bratislava, Slovakia

2021 World Championships
- Venue: Čunovo Water Sports Centre
- Location: Bratislava, Slovakia
- Dates: 22–26 September

The 2021 ICF Canoe Slalom World Championships took place from 22 to 26 September 2021 in Bratislava, Slovakia under the auspices of International Canoe Federation (ICF). It was the 41st edition. The events took place at the Čunovo Water Sports Centre which was reconstructed before the championships. Bratislava hosted the championships for the second time after previously hosting in 2011.

Bratislava also hosted the 2021 Wildwater Canoeing World Championships as part of the same event.

== Schedule ==
Ten medal events were contested.

All times listed are UTC+2.

Date	Starting Time	Events
22 September	09:00	K1W, K1M, C1W, C1M teams
23 September	09:00	K1W, K1M heats – 1st run
23 September	11:50	K1W, K1M heats – 2nd run
23 September	15:00	C1W, C1M heats – 1st run
23 September	17:00	C1W, C1M heats – 2nd run
24 September	13:55	Extreme slalom Women & Men – Time trials
25 September	09:03	K1W, K1M semifinals
25 September	12:03	K1W, K1M finals
26 September	09:03	C1W, C1M semifinals
26 September	11:33	C1W, C1M finals
26 September	15:30	Extreme slalom Women & Men – Heats
26 September	16:33	Extreme slalom Women & Men – Quarterfinals
26 September	17:09	Extreme slalom Women & Men – Semifinals
26 September	17:29	Extreme slalom Women & Men – Finals

== Medal summary ==
=== Medal table ===
* Host nation (Slovakia)

Rank	Nation	Gold	Silver	Bronze	Total
1	France	3	0	0	3
2	Czech Republic	2	2	1	5
2	Germany	2	2	1	5
4	Great Britain	2	1	1	4
5	Australia	1	0	0	1
6	Slovakia*	0	2	2	4
7	Spain	0	1	1	2
8	Italy	0	1	0	1
8	New Zealand	0	1	0	1
10	Austria	0	0	1	1
10	RCF	0	0	1	1
10	Slovenia	0	0	1	1
10	United States	0	0	1	1
Totals (13 entries)		10	10	10	30

=== Men ===
==== Canoe ====
Event	Gold		Silver		Bronze	
C1	Václav Chaloupka; Czech Republic	92.02	Alexander Slafkovský; Slovakia	92.17	Franz Anton; Germany	94.10
C1 team	France; Martin Thomas; Denis Gargaud Chanut; Nicolas Gestin	95.34	Czech Republic; Lukáš Rohan; Václav Chaloupka; Vojtěch Heger	96.03	Slovakia; Matej Beňuš; Marko Mirgorodský; Alexander Slafkovský	100.83

==== Kayak ====
Event	Gold		Silver		Bronze	
K1	Boris Neveu; France	83.92	Marcello Beda; Italy	87.75	Joan Crespo; Spain	87.90
K1 team	France; Boris Neveu; Mathieu Biazizzo; Benjamin Renia	91.64	Slovakia; Jakub Grigar; Martin Halčin; Adam Gonšenica	93.49	Slovenia; Peter Kauzer; Martin Srabotnik; Niko Testen	94.84
Extreme slalom	Joe Clarke; Great Britain		Finn Butcher; New Zealand		Mario Leitner; Austria	

=== Women ===
==== Canoe ====
Event	Gold		Silver		Bronze	
C1	Elena Apel; Germany	99.03	Mallory Franklin; Great Britain	99.34	Gabriela Satková; Czech Republic	102.50
C1 team	Czech Republic; Tereza Fišerová; Gabriela Satková; Martina Satková	110.43	Spain; Núria Vilarrubla; Klara Olazabal; Miren Lazkano	112.00	RCF; Alsu Minazova; Polina Mukhgaleeva; Zulfiia Sabitova	118.05

==== Kayak ====
Event	Gold		Silver		Bronze	
K1	Ricarda Funk; Germany	94.80	Elena Apel; Germany	97.31	Kimberley Woods; Great Britain	97.90
K1 team	Great Britain; Kimberley Woods; Fiona Pennie; Mallory Franklin	101.24	Czech Republic; Kateřina Minařík Kudějová; Antonie Galušková; Lucie Nesnídalová	106.71	Slovakia; Eliška Mintálová; Jana Dukátová; Soňa Stanovská	107.72
Extreme slalom	Jessica Fox; Australia		Elena Apel; Germany		Evy Leibfarth; United States	
