= Evy Leibfarth =

American slalom canoeist (born 2004)

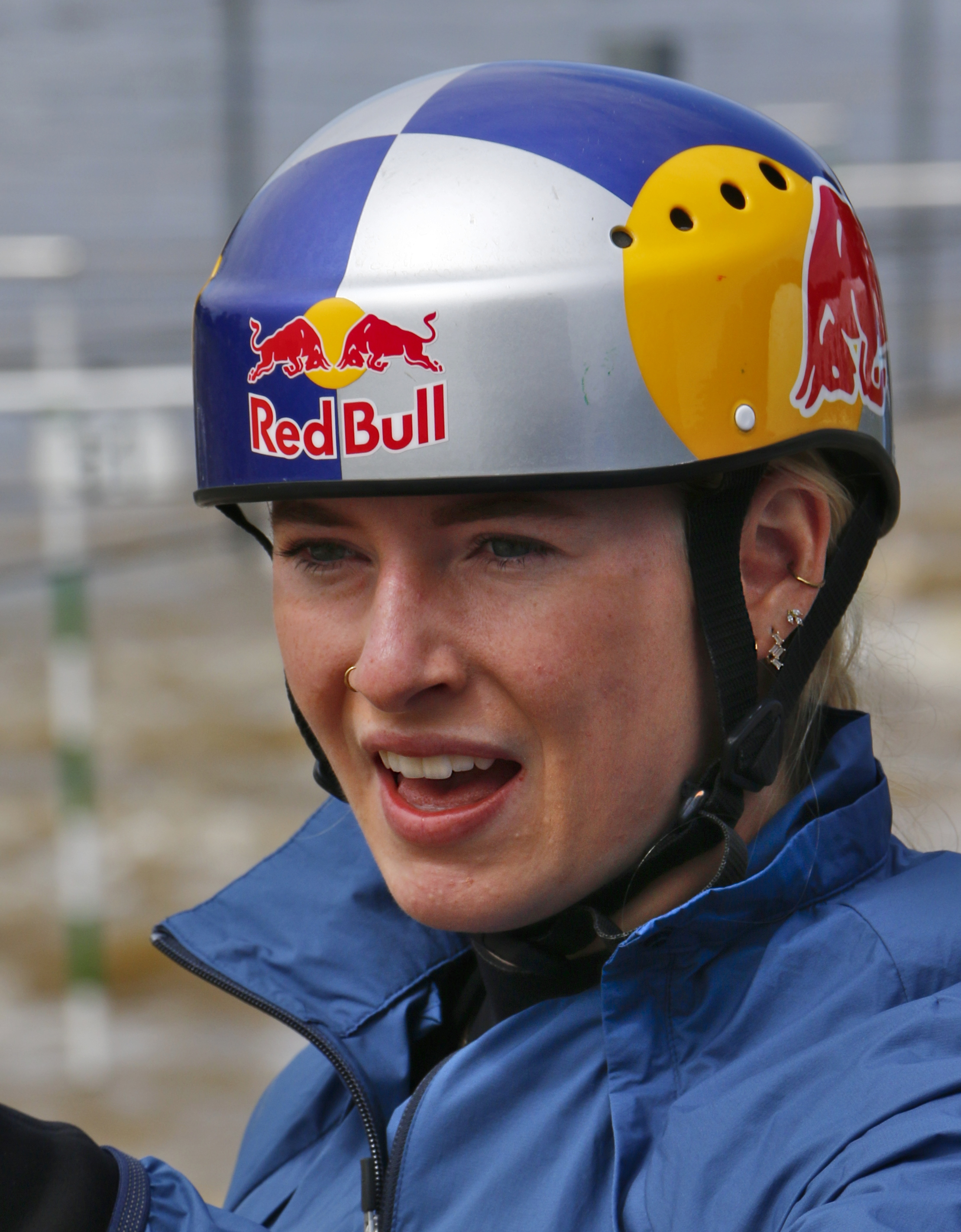
- Leibfarth in 2024

Personal information
- Born: January 26, 2004 (age 22) Sylva, North Carolina, U.S.
- Education: K12 Private Academy
- Height: 5 ft 4 in (163 cm)

Sport
- Country: United States
- Sport: Canoe slalom
- Event: C1, K1, Kayak cross
Medal record
Women's canoe slalom
Representing the United States
Olympic Games
Bronze medal – third place	2024 Paris	C1
World Championships
Silver medal – second place	2026 Oklahoma City	K1
Bronze medal – third place	2021 Bratislava	Kayak cross
Pan American Games
Gold medal – first place	2019 Lima	K1
Gold medal – first place	2023 Santiago	K1
Silver medal – second place	2019 Lima	Kayak cross
Bronze medal – third place	2023 Santiago	Kayak cross
U23 World Championships
Gold medal – first place	2023 Kraków	K1
Gold medal – first place	2025 Foix	C1
Silver medal – second place	2025 Foix	K1
Bronze medal – third place	2023 Kraków	C1
Bronze medal – third place	2025 Foix	K1 team
Junior World Championships
Gold medal – first place	2019 Kraków	Kayak cross
Gold medal – first place	2021 Tacen	K1
Gold medal – first place	2022 Ivrea	Kayak cross
Bronze medal – third place	2019 Kraków	K1
Bronze medal – third place	2021 Tacen	C1

Evy Leibfarth (/ˈɛvi ˈliːbfɑːrθ/ EV-ee LEEB-farth; born January 26, 2004) is an American slalom canoeist who has competed at the international level since 2019.

She is a two time Olympian, winning a bronze medal in the C1 event at the 2024 Summer Olympics in Paris.

She won two medals at the ICF Canoe Slalom World Championships with a silver the K1 event in 2026 and a bronze in kayak cross in 2021.

== Career ==
In 2019, at age 15, Leibfarth won the gold medal in the women's K1 event and the silver medal in the women's Kayak cross event at the Pan American Games held in Lima, Peru.

In the same year, Leibfarth also competed at the 2019 World Junior and U23 Canoe Slalom Championships held in Kraków, Poland, winning the gold medal in the junior Kayak cross event and the bronze medal in the junior K1 event.

Leibfarth represented the United States at the 2020 Summer Olympics in Tokyo, Japan. Leibfarth started in both women's events and finished 12th in the K1 event and 18th in the C1 event, after being eliminated in the semifinals on both occasions.

Leibfarth won a bronze medal in Kayak cross at the 2021 World Championships in Bratislava.

At the 2024 Summer Olympics in Paris she competed in all three disciplines, winning bronze in the C1 event. She also finished 15th in the K1 event and 10th in kayak cross.

At the 2026 ICF Canoe Slalom World Championships in Oklahoma City, she won silver in the individual K1 event, the first world championship kayak slalom medal for an American woman since Rebecca Giddens' bronze K1 medal in 2003.

== Personal life ==
Leibfarth is bisexual and was among the LGBT athletes competing at two Olympic Games.

She attended Davidson College where she studied biology.

== Results ==
=== World Cup individual podiums ===
	1st place, gold medalist(s)	2nd place, silver medalist(s)	3rd place, bronze medalist(s)	Total
C1	0	1	2	3
K1	1	0	3	4
Kayak cross	0	2	2	4
Kayak cross individual	0	0	2	2
Total	1	3	9	13

Season	Date	Venue	Position	Event
2019	June 23, 2019	Bratislava	2nd	Kayak cross
2019	June 30, 2019	Tacen	3rd	C1
2020	October 17, 2020	Tacen	3rd	K1
2020	October 18, 2020	Tacen	3rd	C1
2022	June 26, 2022	Tacen	2nd	C1
2024	June 2, 2024	Augsburg	3rd	Kayak cross
2024	September 20, 2024	La Seu d'Urgell	3rd	K1
2025	June 28, 2025	Prague	1st	K1
2025	29 June 2025	Prague	3rd	Kayak cross
2025	29 August 2025	Tacen	3rd	K1
2025	31 August 2025	Tacen	3rd	Kayak cross individual
2026	14 June 2026	Augsburg	3rd	Kayak cross individual
2026	14 June 2026	Augsburg	2nd	Kayak cross

=== Complete World Cup results ===
Year	Class	WC1	WC2	WC3	WC4	WC5	Points	Position
2019	C1	Lee Valley (United Kingdom)	Bratislava (Slovakia); 7	Tacen (Slovenia); 3	Markkleeberg (Germany); 26	Prague (Czech Republic); 10	171	6th
2019	K1	Lee Valley (United Kingdom)	10	9	26	27	105	23rd
2019	Kayak cross	Lee Valley (United Kingdom)	2				55	12th
2020	C1	Tacen (Slovenia); 3	Pau (France); 16				N/A^{[a]}	
2020	K1	3	10				N/A^{[a]}	
2021	C1	Prague (Czech Republic); 15	Markkleeberg (Germany); 29	La Seu (Spain); 28	Pau (France); 28		62	30th
2021	K1	28	11	10	19		123	15th
2021	Kayak cross			5	27		48	17th

Notes
^{a} No overall rankings were determined by the ICF, with only two races possible due to the COVID-19 pandemic.
