= Kanupark Markkleeberg =

Whitewater course in Markkleeberg, Germany

Coordinates: 51.258°N 12.427°E

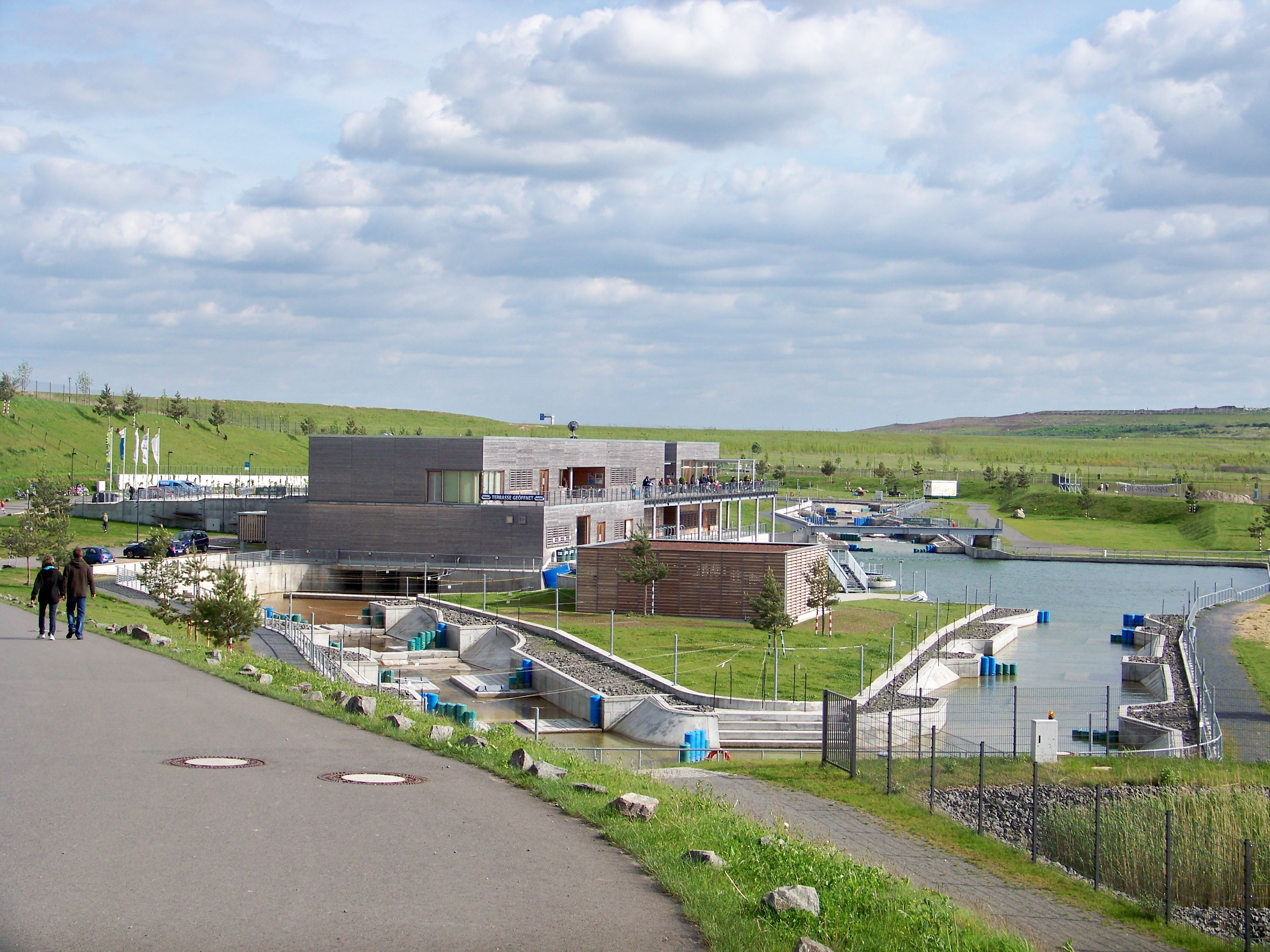
Kanupark Markkleeberg from the street

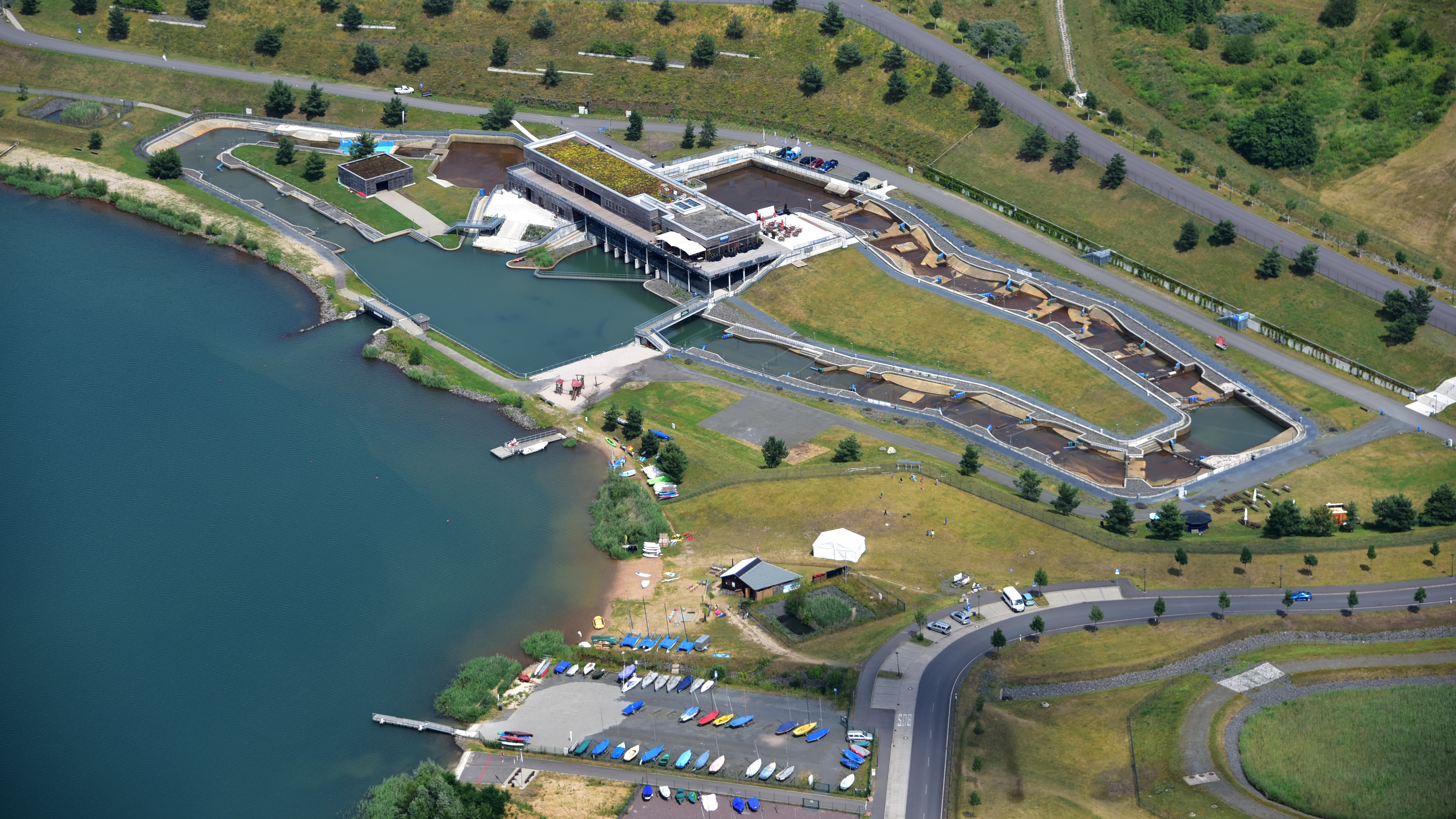
Kanupark Markkleeberg from above

Kanupark Markkleeberg, built in 2006, is the second of two artificial whitewater canoe/kayak slalom courses in Germany, and the only one powered by pumps. The other German course is the Eiskanal in Augsburg, used in the 1972 Summer Olympic Games in Munich. Kanupark Markkleeberg is located on the southeast shore of Markkleeberger See, a lake south of Markkleeberg, a suburb on the south side of Leipzig. A former open-pit coal mine, the lake was flooded in 1999 with groundwater and developed as a water recreation area. The lake is part of the Leipziger Neuseenland, the largest landscape construction project in Europe, which is reclaiming formerly barren industrial and mining sites for recreational use.

The whitewater park was planned as part of Leipzig's bid to host the 2012 Summer Olympics, which were ultimately awarded to London. It was completed in time to serve as a training facility for the 2008 Beijing Olympics. With movable plastic bollards serving as water diversion features, it was possible to rig the competition course to be a close duplicate of the one at Beijing's Shunyi Olympic Rowing-Canoeing Park. Since formally opening in April 2007, the state-of-the-art Kanupark has hosted a full schedule of regional and international competitions. In 2010 it hosted the Junior and Under-23 European Championships.

Kanupark Markkleeberg has two courses which loop in opposite directions from the pump house. Each loop has its own conveyor-belt boat lift. The north loop is a training course 130 meters (430 feet) long, with a 1.8 meters (5.9 feet) drop, a 1.4% slope of 13.8 m/km (73 ft/mile), and a streamflow of 4 to 14 m³/s (141 to 494 ft³/s). The south loop is the competition course with a length of 270 meters (890 feet), a 5.2 meters (17 feet) drop, and a 2.1% slope of 21.1 m/km (111 ft/mile). With a streamflow of 4 to 18 m³/s (141 to 636 ft³/s), it generates class III-IV whitewater.
