= Canoe slalom at the 2023 European Games – Women's K1 =

Women's kayak at the 2023 European Games
- Venue: Kraków-Kolna Canoe Slalom Course
- Date: 29 June - 1 July
- Competitors: 44 from 19 nations

Medalists
| gold medal | Ricarda Funk | Germany |
| silver medal | Klaudia Zwolińska | Poland |
| bronze medal | Tereza Fišerová | Czech Republic |

The canoe slalom women's kayak event at the 2023 European Games took place on 1 July 2023 at the Kraków-Kolna Canoe Slalom Course in Kraków, with the qualification heats on 29 June 2023.

== Competition format ==
The event uses a three-round format with qualification heats, semifinal and final. Paddlers complete up to two runs in the heats, with the top ranked athletes starting last. In the first heat, the 20 fastest paddlers qualify automatically for the semifinal, whilst the rest compete in the second heat for additional 10 qualification spots. The final rank of non-qualifying athletes is determined by their second run score. Paddlers start in the reverse order of their heats position in the semifinal and complete a single run, with the top 10 advancing to the final. The start list for the final is once again in reverse order of the semifinal results. The athlete with the best time in the single-run final is awarded gold.

A penalty of 2 seconds is awarded for touching a gate and a 50-second penalty is awarded for missing a gate or negotiating it in the opposite direction.

An easier gate setup is generally used for the heats and then a more difficult one for semifinal and final.

== Schedule ==
All times are Central European Summer Time (UTC+2)

| Date | Time | Round |
|---|---|---|
29 June 2023
| 29 June 2023 | 10:50 | Heats Run 1 |
| 29 June 2023 | 12:20 | Heats Run 2 |
1 July 2023
| 1 July 2023 | 11:05 | Semifinal |
| 1 July 2023 | 13:10 | Final |

== Results ==
Penalties are included in the time shown. The fastest time in each round is shown in bold.

| Rank | Bib | Athlete | Country | Heats | | | | | | Semifinal | | | Final | | |
| Rank | Bib | Athlete | Country | Run 1 | | | Run 2 | | | Semifinal | | | Final | | |
| Rank | Bib | Athlete | Country | Time | Pen | Rank | Time | Pen | Rank | Time | Pen | Rank | Time | Pen | Rank |
|---|---|---|---|---|---|---|---|---|---|---|---|---|---|---|---|
| 1st place, gold medalist(s) | 1 | Ricarda Funk | Germany | 96.67 | 2 | 7 | - | | | 104.86 | 4 | 10 | **99.09** | 2 | 1 |
| 2nd place, silver medalist(s) | 7 | Klaudia Zwolińska | Poland | **95.06** | 0 | 1 | - | | | 103.09 | 0 | 3 | 101.06 | 4 | 2 |
| 3rd place, bronze medalist(s) | 8 | Tereza Fišerová | Czech Republic | 96.20 | 0 | 6 | - | | | 103.44 | 0 | 4 | 102.34 | 0 | 3 |
| 4 | 17 | Natalia Pacierpnik | Poland | 99.40 | 2 | 14 | - | | | 102.86 | 0 | 2 | 106.08 | 2 | 4 |
| 5 | 3 | Eva Terčelj | Slovenia | 102.55 | 4 | 22 | 107.54 | 10 | 9 | 103.54 | 0 | 5 | 106.82 | 2 | 5 |
| 6 | 13 | Corinna Kuhnle | Austria | 95.39 | 0 | 2 | - | | | 103.55 | 4 | 6 | 107.08 | 4 | 6 |
| 7 | 9 | Kimberley Woods | Great Britain | 97.83 | 4 | 8 | - | | | 103.79 | 2 | 7 | 107.52 | 2 | 7 |
| 8 | 5 | Camille Prigent | France | 95.46 | 2 | 3 | - | | | 104.25 | 2 | 9 | 107.93 | 2 | 8 |
| 8 | 6 | Mallory Franklin | Great Britain | 98.32 | 0 | 11 | - | | | 103.83 | 2 | 8 | 107.93 | 4 | 8 |
| 10 | 2 | Elena Lilik | Germany | 95.75 | 0 | 5 | - | | | **101.79** | 0 | 1 | 110.71 | 2 | 10 |
| 11 | 15 | Mònica Dòria Vilarrubla | Andorra | 98.79 | 2 | 13 | - | | | 104.94 | 2 | 11 | did not advance | | |
| 12 | 24 | Laia Sorribes | Spain | 98.43 | 0 | 12 | - | | | 104.98 | 4 | 12 | did not advance | | |
| 13 | 21 | Antonie Galušková | Czech Republic | 100.45 | 4 | 19 | - | | | 105.32 | 2 | 13 | did not advance | | |
| 14 | 4 | Stefanie Horn | Italy | 95.53 | 2 | 4 | - | | | 105.56 | 0 | 14 | did not advance | | |
| 15 | 26 | Alena Marx | Switzerland | 98.31 | 0 | 10 | - | | | 105.64 | 0 | 15 | did not advance | | |
| 16 | 27 | Emily Apel | Germany | 104.31 | 2 | 28 | 105.12 | 8 | 5 | 106.65 | 0 | 16 | did not advance | | |
| 17 | 12 | Maialen Chourraut | Spain | 99.89 | 0 | 17 | - | | | 107.35 | 2 | 17 | did not advance | | |
| 18 | 16 | Eva Alina Hočevar | Slovenia | 103.99 | 2 | 27 | 101.99 | 0 | 3 | 108.15 | 2 | 18 | did not advance | | |
| 19 | 11 | Eliška Mintálová | Slovakia | 99.55 | 6 | 15 | - | | | 108.21 | 2 | 19 | did not advance | | |
| 20 | 29 | Phoebe Spicer | Great Britain | 112.28 | 8 | 33 | 106.36 | 6 | 7 | 108.82 | 2 | 20 | did not advance | | |
| 21 | 18 | Martina Wegman | Netherlands | 98.03 | 4 | 9 | - | | | 108.84 | 4 | 21 | did not advance | | |
| 22 | 10 | Viktoriia Us | Ukraine | 101.15 | 2 | 20 | - | | | 110.50 | 2 | 22 | did not advance | | |
| 23 | 38 | Madison Corcoran | Ireland | 110.42 | 8 | 32 | 106.72 | 4 | 8 | 112.06 | 2 | 23 | did not advance | | |
| 24 | 20 | Lena Teunissen | Netherlands | 101.21 | 4 | 21 | 99.19 | 0 | 2 | 113.02 | 6 | 24 | did not advance | | |
| 25 | 14 | Amálie Hilgertová | Czech Republic | 103.65 | 6 | 26 | **97.03** | 0 | 1 | 117.50 | 2 | 25 | did not advance | | |
| 26 | 19 | Viktoria Wolffhardt | Austria | 154.76 | 54 | 42 | 105.48 | 4 | 6 | 119.44 | 0 | 26 | did not advance | | |
| 27 | 22 | Emma Vuitton | France | 99.96 | 2 | 18 | - | | | 155.31 | 52 | 27 | did not advance | | |
| 28 | 23 | Ajda Novak | Slovenia | 155.39 | 56 | 43 | 103.24 | 6 | 4 | 157.40 | 50 | 28 | did not advance | | |
| 29 | 28 | Soňa Stanovská | Slovakia | 102.71 | 2 | 23 | 108.09 | 6 | 10 | 158.69 | 52 | 29 | did not advance | | |
| 30 | 31 | Marjorie Delassus | France | 99.96 | 2 | 18 | - | | | DSQ | | 30 | did not advance | | |
| 31 | 30 | Chiara Sabattini | Italy | 107.39 | 6 | 31 | 109.77 | 8 | 11 | did not advance | | | | | |
| 32 | 36 | Katja Bengeri | Croatia | 102.86 | 2 | 24 | 109.78 | 4 | 12 | did not advance | | | | | |
| 33 | 37 | Olatz Arregui | Spain | 105.55 | 4 | 29 | 109.93 | 8 | 13 | did not advance | | | | | |
| 34 | 25 | Marta Bertoncelli | Italy | 102.99 | 0 | 25 | 112.78 | 6 | 14 | did not advance | | | | | |
| 35 | 35 | Dominika Brzeska | Poland | 107.07 | 6 | 30 | 114.88 | 12 | 15 | did not advance | | | | | |
| 36 | 32 | Michaela Haššová | Slovakia | 115.60 | 8 | 36 | 118.15 | 14 | 16 | did not advance | | | | | |
| 37 | 42 | Viktoriia Dobrotvorska | Ukraine | 118.76 | 0 | 37 | 120.07 | 8 | 17 | did not advance | | | | | |
| 38 | 33 | Laura Pellicer Chica | Andorra | 114.32 | 6 | 34 | 121.12 | 6 | 18 | did not advance | | | | | |
| 39 | 40 | Anna Lychko | Ukraine | 129.13 | 6 | 38 | 121.30 | 8 | 19 | did not advance | | | | | |
| 40 | 39 | Sára Tímea Seprenyi | Hungary | 133.25 | 10 | 39 | 127.49 | 4 | 20 | did not advance | | | | | |
| 41 | 41 | Iris Fyksen Sommernes | Norway | 139.32 | 10 | 40 | 136.27 | 10 | 21 | did not advance | | | | | |
| 42 | 44 | Blandine Myriam Xhemajlji | Kosovo | 143.34 | 14 | 41 | 142.17 | 8 | 22 | did not advance | | | | | |
| 43 | 43 | Zita Mária Lakner | Hungary | 270.25 | 118 | 44 | 166.03 | 20 | 23 | did not advance | | | | | |
| 44 | 34 | Claudia Leenders | Netherlands | 114.92 | 4 | 35 | 168.26 | 58 | 24 | did not advance | | | | | |
