= 2022 ICF Canoe Slalom World Championships – Women's K1 =

Women's kayak at the 2022 ICF Canoe Slalom World Championships
- Venue: Augsburg Eiskanal
- Location: Augsburg, Germany
- Dates: 28-30 July 2022
- Competitors: 74 from 35 nations

Medalists
gold medal	Ricarda Funk	Germany
silver medal	Jessica Fox	Australia
bronze medal	Elena Lilik	Germany

The women's kayak event at the 2022 ICF Canoe Slalom World Championships took place on 30 July 2022 at the Augsburg Eiskanal in Augsburg, with the qualification heats on 28 July 2022.

== Competition format ==
The event uses a three-round format with qualification heats, semifinal and final. Paddlers complete up to two runs in the heats, with the top ranked athletes starting last. In the first heat, the 20 fastest paddlers qualify automatically for the semifinal, whilst the rest compete in the second heat for additional 10 qualification spots. The final rank of non-qualifying athletes is determined by their second run score. Paddlers start in the reverse order of their heats position in the semifinal and complete a single run, with the top 10 advancing to the final. The start list for the final is once again in reverse order of the semifinal results. The athlete with the best time in the single-run final is awarded gold.

A penalty of 2 seconds is awarded for touching a gate and a 50-second penalty is awarded for missing a gate or negotiating it in the opposite direction.

An easier gate setup is generally used for the heats and then a more difficult one for semifinal and final.

== Schedule ==
All times are Central European Summer Time (UTC+2)

Date	Time	Round
28 July 2022
28 July 2022	09:15	Heats Run 1
28 July 2022	14:15	Heats Run 2
30 July 2022
30 July 2022	09:03	Semifinal
30 July 2022	12:05	Final

== Results ==
Penalties are included in the time shown. The fastest time in each round is shown in bold.

Rank	Bib	Athlete	Country	Heats						Semifinal			Final		
Rank	Bib	Athlete	Country	Run 1			Run 2			Semifinal			Final		
Rank	Bib	Athlete	Country	Time	Pen	Rank	Time	Pen	Rank	Time	Pen	Rank	Time	Pen	Rank
1st place, gold medalist(s)	2	Ricarda Funk	Germany	104.62	4	19	-			**103.74**	0	1	**101.14**	0	1
2nd place, silver medalist(s)	1	Jessica Fox	Australia	99.64	0	5	-			109.06	2	5	102.45	0	2
3rd place, bronze medalist(s)	13	Elena Lilik	Germany	103.68	4	13	-			105.54	2	2	103.99	2	3
4	8	Camille Prigent	France	103.51	4	12	-			111.44	0	8	106.43	0	4
5	7	Maialen Chourraut	Spain	105.77	0	24	104.17	2	9	109.88	2	7	108.68	0	5
6	14	Klaudia Zwolińska	Poland	103.38	4	11	-			111.63	2	10	111.07	2	6
7	17	Martina Wegman	Netherlands	104.12	2	15	-			111.47	0	9	111.41	4	7
8	4	Eva Terčelj	Slovenia	104.19	2	17	-			108.71	0	4	114.01	6	8
9	11	Kimberley Woods	Great Britain	109.07	6	28	102.30	0	4	109.31	0	6	114.93	0	9
10	6	Stefanie Horn	Italy	**98.33**	0	1	-			107.01	0	3	156.27	50	10
11	24	Romane Prigent	France	105.30	2	22	103.54	2	6	112.23	0	11	did not advance		
12	10	Ana Sátila	Brazil	107.13	2	26	104.07	2	8	112.30	2	12	did not advance		
13	9	Viktoriia Us	Ukraine	106.09	2	25	101.94	0	3	112.71	0	13	did not advance		
14	27	Noemie Fox	Australia	101.63	0	7	-			116.19	4	14	did not advance		
15	12	Eliška Mintálová	Slovakia	99.23	0	4	-			116.20	2	15	did not advance		
16	43	Omira Estácia Neta	Brazil	166.89	54	59	104.01	0	7	116.30	0	16	did not advance		
17	22	Antonie Galušková	Czech Republic	104.77	4	20	-			116.31	2	17	did not advance		
18	19	Evy Leibfarth	United States	102.82	0	10	-			116.89	2	18	did not advance		
19	15	Viktoria Wolffhardt	Austria	105.31	0	23	100.25	0	2	117.52	2	19	did not advance		
20	31	Lena Teunissen	Netherlands	105.03	2	21	**98.87**	0	1	118.76	2	20	did not advance		
21	32	Carole Bouzidi	Algeria	104.12	0	15	-			119.64	4	21	did not advance		
22	29	Aki Yazawa	Japan	114.67	0	46	104.28	2	10	119.87	4	22	did not advance		
23	34	Marta Bertoncelli	Italy	100.99	0	6	-			120.02	2	23	did not advance		
24	23	Eva Alina Hočevar	Slovenia	104.06	0	14	-			120.43	2	24	did not advance		
25	16	Jasmin Schornberg	Germany	104.57	2	18	-			121.53	4	25	did not advance		
26	5	Mallory Franklin	Great Britain	102.50	0	9	-			160.59	52	26	did not advance		
27	26	Ajda Novak	Slovenia	111.08	4	37	102.32	2	5	166.99	56	27	did not advance		
28	38	Zuzana Paňková	Slovakia	98.43	0	2	-			169.11	54	28	did not advance		
29	18	Tereza Fišerová	Czech Republic	101.96	0	8	-			174.14	54	29	did not advance		
30	25	Mònica Dòria Vilarrubla	Andorra	99.09	0	3	-			175.57	60	30	did not advance		
31	28	Laia Sorribes	Spain	113.07	6	42	104.30	2	11	did not advance					
32	3	Corinna Kuhnle	Austria	107.26	2	27	104.56	2	12	did not advance					
33	30	Emma Vuitton	France	110.65	0	34	104.67	0	13	did not advance					
34	40	Alena Marx	Switzerland	112.09	2	40	104.91	0	14	did not advance					
35	47	Yan Jiahua	China	165.26	52	57	105.35	0	15	did not advance					
36	48	Naemi Brändle	Switzerland	109.85	0	29	106.15	2	16	did not advance					
37	49	Laura Pellicer Chica	Andorra	173.42	56	63	106.54	2	17	did not advance					
38	21	Barbora Valíková	Czech Republic	110.17	2	31	106.99	2	18	did not advance					
39	37	Hannah Thomas	New Zealand	110.80	2	35	107.81	2	19	did not advance					
40	52	Madison Corcoran	Ireland	114.12	6	45	108.28	4	20	did not advance					
41	50	Janina Kriesinger	Belgium	113.57	4	43	109.22	0	21	did not advance					
42	33	Megan Hamer-Evans	Great Britain	150.94	50	55	109.95	4	22	did not advance					
43	20	Natalia Pacierpnik	Poland	111.50	2	38	110.85	8	23	did not advance					
44	51	Léa Baldoni	Canada	113.93	4	44	111.44	6	24	did not advance					
45	54	Ren Mishima	Japan	110.46	0	32	113.07	2	25	did not advance					
46	53	Marcella Altman	United States	171.42	54	62	113.61	4	26	did not advance					
47	45	Florence Maheu	Canada	115.04	2	47	114.12	2	27	did not advance					
48	44	Lois Betteridge	Canada	166.45	50	58	117.25	2	28	did not advance					
49	64	Zou Xiaolin	China	124.53	0	50	117.39	0	29	did not advance					
50	55	Kurumi Ito	Japan	169.02	56	61	117.71	0	30	did not advance					
51	63	Simona Glejteková	Slovakia	112.80	2	41	117.87	4	31	did not advance					
52	46	Julia Cuchi	Spain	110.48	4	33	117.97	6	32	did not advance					
53	41	Claudia Leenders	Netherlands	110.86	4	36	119.00	8	33	did not advance					
54	72	Yekaterina Tarantseva	Kazakhstan	139.87	6	52	129.78	6	34	did not advance					
55	57	Sára Tímea Seprenyi	Hungary	149.65	14	54	143.11	4	35	did not advance					
56	58	Roxana Razeghian	Iran	167.47	8	60	150.79	12	36	did not advance					
57	35	Li Tong	China	115.19	2	48	153.89	50	37	did not advance					
58	39	Ria Sribar	United States	109.87	2	30	157.29	52	38	did not advance					
59	42	Courtney Williams	New Zealand	226.37	106	66	161.44	52	39	did not advance					
60	60	Katja Bengeri	Croatia	116.40	4	49	163.98	58	40	did not advance					
61	68	Luca Török	Hungary	371.64	208	71	167.96	18	41	did not advance					
62	59	Dominika Brzeska	Poland	159.77	54	56	172.31	52	42	did not advance					
63	65	Ana Fernandes Castro	Paraguay	212.36	52	65	177.78	12	43	did not advance					
64	67	Shikha Chouhan	India	252.17	64	68	191.26	12	44	did not advance					
65	56	Sofía Reinoso	Mexico	135.32	6	51	192.15	52	45	did not advance					
66	36	Kate Eckhardt	Australia	111.70	2	39	200.50	100	46	did not advance					
67	74	Zita Mária Lakner	Hungary	320.00	124	70	214.49	64	47	did not advance					
68	62	Veronika Šalaševičiūtė-Turbinova	Lithuania	181.06	6	64	214.92	62	48	did not advance					
69	66	Iris Sommernes	Norway	235.41	52	67	226.01	58	49	did not advance					
70	71	Bhumi Baghel	India	403.34	220	72	377.44	172	50	did not advance					
71	61	Anaïs Mouhoub	Algeria	147.09	4	53	396.97	262	51	did not advance					
72	70	Olgica Melova	North Macedonia	288.41	120	69	399.56	214	52	did not advance					
73	69	Lenny Carmen Ramirez Bustillos	Peru	462.64	264	73	520.48	362	53	did not advance					
74	73	Priyanshi Raja Bundela	India	691.82	464	74	698.88	508	54	did not advance					
