= 2025 ICF Canoe Slalom World Championships – Women's K1 =

Women's kayak at the 2025 ICF Canoe Slalom World Championships
- Venue: Penrith Whitewater Stadium
- Location: Penrith, Australia
- Dates: 1–3 October 2025
- Competitors: 54 from 27 nations

Medalists
gold medal	Klaudia Zwolińska	Poland
silver medal	Kimberley Woods	Great Britain
bronze medal	Kate Eckhardt	Australia

The women's kayak event at the 2025 ICF Canoe Slalom World Championships took place on 3 October 2025 at the Penrith Whitewater Stadium in Penrith, with the qualification heats on 1 October 2025.

== Competition format ==
The event uses a three-round format with qualification heats, semifinal and final. The top 30 paddlers from the single qualification run qualify for the semifinal. Paddlers start in the reverse order of their qualification position in the semifinal and complete a single run, with the top 12 advancing to the final. The start list for the final is once again in reverse order of the semifinal results. The athlete with the best time in the single-run final is awarded gold.

A penalty of 2 seconds is awarded for touching a gate and a 50-second penalty is awarded for missing a gate or negotiating it in the opposite direction.

The qualification course had 22 gates including 6 upstream gates (2-7-10-11-15-21). The semifinal and final course had 25 gates with 6 upstream gates (4-5-11-12-20-24).

== Schedule ==
All times listed are UTC+10.

Date	Time	Round
1 October 2025
1 October 2025	09:03	Heats
3 October 2025
3 October 2025	10:33	Semifinal
3 October 2025	14:33	Final

== Results ==
Penalties are included in the time shown. The fastest time in each round is shown in bold.

Rank	Bib	Canoeist	Nation	Heats			Semifinal			Final		
Rank	Bib	Canoeist	Nation	Time	Pen	Rank	Time	Pen	Rank	Time	Pen	Rank
1	5	Klaudia Zwolińska	Poland	98.69	0	9	106.68	0	6	**100.32**	0	1
2	2	Kimberley Woods	Great Britain	101.77	2	19	106.43	2	4	102.09	2	2
3	16	Kate Eckhardt	Australia	99.72	0	13	107.85	2	10	103.84	0	3
4	1	Ricarda Funk	Germany	**95.78**	0	1	106.98	2	7	104.23	0	4
5	6	Maialen Chourraut	Spain	105.25	2	28	103.68	2	2	105.54	2	5
6	3	Camille Prigent	France	96.06	0	2	**103.84**	0	1	105.87	2	6
7	11	Ana Sátila	Brazil	98.28	2	7	107.90	0	11	106.01	2	7
8	18	Zuzana Paňková	Slovakia	98.50	0	8	107.63	0	8	106.43	0	8
9	4	Evy Leibfarth	United States	100.68	0	15	106.59	0	5	107.83	2	9
10	7	Eva Alina Hočevar	Slovenia	98.72	0	10	105.82	0	3	107.90	2	10
11	24	Viktoriia Us	Ukraine	99.42	0	11	107.76	0	9	108.33	0	11
12	12	Noemie Fox	Australia	98.16	0	6	108.77	2	12	114.40	2	12
13	17	Soňa Stanovská	Slovakia	103.02	2	22	109.90	4	13	did not advance		
14	14	Elena Lilik	Germany	101.72	4	17	110.32	0	14	did not advance		
15	8	Gabriela Satková	Czech Republic	98.14	0	5	110.36	2	15	did not advance		
16	51	Alsu Minazova	Individual Neutral Athletes	105.64	4	30	110.62	2	16	did not advance		
17	13	Antonie Galušková	Czech Republic	101.40	0	16	110.65	2	17	did not advance		
18	9	Lois Leaver	Great Britain	97.58	0	4	111.08	4	18	did not advance		
19	10	Emma Vuitton	France	96.89	0	3	111.50	4	19	did not advance		
20	31	Nikita Setchell	Great Britain	104.82	6	27	113.18	2	20	did not advance		
21	29	Leire Goñi	Spain	102.48	0	20	113.96	2	21	did not advance		
22	22	Ajda Novak	Slovenia	101.73	0	18	114.07	2	22	did not advance		
23	19	Eva Pietracha	France	103.60	2	23	114.27	4	23	did not advance		
24	21	Alena Marx	Switzerland	99.94	0	14	116.33	2	24	did not advance		
25	27	Ria Sribar	United States	99.53	0	12	117.12	2	25	did not advance		
26	20	Laia Sorribes	Spain	102.76	2	21	118.73	2	26	did not advance		
27	37	Aki Yazawa	Japan	103.71	4	24	119.57	8	27	did not advance		
28	41	Xie Xueting	China	104.38	2	26	122.05	2	28	did not advance		
29	36	Li Shiting	China	105.54	2	29	130.23	2	29	did not advance		
30	15	Mònica Dòria	Andorra	103.85	4	25	161.24	54	30	did not advance		
31	50	Kseniia Krylova	Individual Neutral Athletes	105.89	2	31	did not advance					
32	30	Dominika Brzeska	Poland	105.96	2	32	did not advance					
33	38	Marcella Altman	United States	106.62	0	33	did not advance					
34	39	Courtney Williams	New Zealand	107.23	0	34	did not advance					
35	34	Hanna Danek	Poland	107.26	0	35	did not advance					
36	23	Lena Teunissen	Netherlands	107.54	4	36	did not advance					
37	40	Wu Ting-i	Chinese Taipei	109.72	0	37	did not advance					
38	35	Emanuela Luknárová	Slovakia	110.48	4	38	did not advance					
39	52	Mariia Sokolova	Individual Neutral Athletes	110.50	0	39	did not advance					
40	28	Lucie Nesnídalová	Czech Republic	111.64	2	40	did not advance					
41	32	Omira Estácia Neta	Brazil	117.89	8	41	did not advance					
42	46	Laura Plata	Colombia	128.18	10	42	did not advance					
43	44	Sofía Reinoso	Mexico	128.45	4	43	did not advance					
44	45	Kahlia Cullwick	New Zealand	129.48	8	44	did not advance					
45	53	Ren Ye	China	129.64	4	45	did not advance					
46	47	Blandine Xhemajlji	Kosovo	135.15	8	46	did not advance					
47	33	Lea Novak	Slovenia	151.86	50	47	did not advance					
48	25	Emily Apel	Germany	153.68	54	48	did not advance					
49	42	Chang Chu-han	Chinese Taipei	155.50	50	49	did not advance					
50	43	Sarah Crosbee	Australia	157.89	56	50	did not advance					
51	26	Chiara Sabattini	Italy	159.40	52	51	did not advance					
52	48	Ana Paula Fernandes Castro	Paraguay	170.52	8	52	did not advance					
53	49	Waris Mills	South Africa	216.68	62	53	did not advance					
	54	Michelle Wambui Kuria	Kenya	Did not start								
