= Canoe slalom at the 2023 European Games – Women's kayak cross =

Women's kayak cross at the 2023 European Games
- Venue: Kraków-Kolna Canoe Slalom Course
- Date: 1-2 July
- Competitors: 40 from 17 nations

Medalists
gold medal	Viktoriia Us	Ukraine
silver medal	Ricarda Funk	Germany
bronze medal	Stefanie Horn	Italy

The women's kayak cross event at the 2023 European Games took place on 2 July 2023 at the Kraków-Kolna Canoe Slalom Course in Kraków, with the qualification on 1 July 2023.

== Competition format ==
The kayak cross event is split into two phases - qualification time trials and knockout phase where 4 paddlers race each other head-to-head. Top 16 paddlers from the qualification advance to the quarterfinal. There are 4 quarterfinal heats with the top 2 paddlers advancing from each to the semifinal. Same rules apply in the two semifinals and the medals are then decided in the final run.

Paddlers start the cross run by sliding off the starting platform several meters above the water. Then they must navigate the downstream and upstream gates. Unlike in classic slalom, paddlers are allowed to touch the gates and even intentionally move them with their paddle, but not with a free hand. There is also a designated zone where paddlers must perform an Eskimo roll.

Athletes can be penalized in three ways in each round, by receiving a fault (FLT) or by being ranked as lower (RAL). Faults are incurred for false starts, missing gates or failing to correctly perform the Eskimo roll. Athletes are ranked as lower (RAL) if they breach the safety requirements of the competition, such as by holding back another athlete with their hands or paddle, deliberately paddling over another athlete's boat, or by making dangerous contact with another athlete's head or body - all other non-dangerous contact is allowed. In each round athletes are ranked first by the order in which they cross the finish line, with those incurring penalties ranked in the following order: FLT, RAL, DNF, DNS.

The final classification of athletes is determined in the following manner: Athletes eliminated at any phase of the competition will be given their rank based on the comparison of the qualification times of athletes eliminated at the same phase. All 3rd ranked athletes will be ranked above all 4th ranked athletes. The final rank of athletes who did not progress to the heats is determined by their qualification results.

== Schedule ==
All times are Central European Summer Time (UTC+2)

Date	Time	Round
1 July 2023
1 July 2023	15:50	Qualification
2 July 2023
2 July 2023	15:20	Quarterfinals
2 July 2023	15:47	Semifinals
2 July 2023	16:05	Final

== Results ==
=== Qualification ===
Rank	Bib	Athlete	Country	Time	Notes
1	18	Stefanie Horn	Italy	67.37	Q
2	5	Ricarda Funk	Germany	67.57	Q
3	21	Maialen Chourraut	Spain	67.99	Q
4	15	Eliška Mintálová	Slovakia	68.01	Q
5	10	Klaudia Zwolińska	Poland	68.29	Q
6	4	Elena Lilik	Germany	68.41	Q
7	16	Zuzana Paňková	Slovakia	68.86	Q
8	14	Marjorie Delassus	France	69.19	Q
9	12	Viktoriia Us	Ukraine	69.35	Q
10	7	Martina Wegman	Netherlands	69.36	Q
11	13	Mallory Franklin	Great Britain	69.38	Q
12	1	Kimberley Woods	Great Britain	69.47	Q
13	23	Veronika Vojtová	Czech Republic	69.56	Q
14	17	Alena Marx	Switzerland	69.62	Q
15	19	Ajda Novak	Slovenia	69.69	Q
16	3	Mònica Dòria Vilarrubla	Andorra	69.73	Q
17	6	Camille Prigent	France	69.83	
18	2	Eva Terčelj	Slovenia	69.87	
19	11	Miren Lazkano	Spain	70.18	
20	20	Olatz Arregui	Spain	70.26	
21	9	Tereza Fišerová	Czech Republic	70.47	
22	28	Emma Vuitton	France	70.53	
23	8	Corinna Kuhnle	Austria	70.90	
24	37	Chiara Sabattini	Italy	71.33	
25	32	Phoebe Spicer	Great Britain	71.41	
26	27	Lena Teunissen	Netherlands	72.17	
27	22	Soňa Stanovská	Slovakia	72.79	
28	25	Eva Alina Hočevar	Slovenia	73.51	
29	34	Viktoriia Dobrotvorska	Ukraine	73.73	
30	26	Laura Pellicer Chica	Andorra	73.89	
31	30	Aleksandra Stach	Poland	74.65	
32	39	Dominika Danek	Poland	76.76	
33	31	Iris Fyksen Sommernes	Norway	81.55	
34	40	Blandine Myriam Xhemajlji	Kosovo	83.80	
35	29	Zita Mária Lakner	Hungary	90.53	
36	35	Tereza Kneblová	Czech Republic	71.72	FLT (6)
37	33	Emily Apel	Germany	76.39	FLT (4)
38	38	Agata Spagnol	Italy	82.59	FLT (4)
39	36	Anna Lychko	Ukraine	82.70	FLT (R)
-	24	Viktoria Wolffhardt	Austria	-	DNS

=== Knockout rounds ===
==== Quarterfinals ====
Heat 1

Rank	Bib	Name	Country	Notes
1	12	Kimberley Woods	Great Britain	Q
2	1	Stefanie Horn	Italy	Q
3	16	Mònica Dòria Vilarrubla	Andorra	FLT (2)
4	8	Marjorie Delassus	France	FLT (1)

Heat 2

Rank	Bib	Name	Country	Notes
1	4	Eliška Mintálová	Slovakia	Q
2	9	Viktoriia Us	Ukraine	Q
3	13	Veronika Vojtová	Czech Republic	
4	5	Klaudia Zwolińska	Poland	FLT (3, 4)

Heat 3

Rank	Bib	Name	Country	Notes
1	6	Elena Lilik	Germany	Q
2	10	Martina Wegman	Netherlands	Q
3	3	Maialen Chourraut	Spain	FLT (3)
4	14	Alena Marx	Switzerland	FLT (2)

Heat 4

Rank	Bib	Name	Country	Notes
1	2	Ricarda Funk	Germany	Q
2	15	Ajda Novak	Slovenia	Q, FLT (6)
3	7	Zuzana Paňková	Slovakia	FLT (3)
4	11	Mallory Franklin	Great Britain	FLT (3)

==== Semifinals ====
Heat 1

Rank	Bib	Name	Country	Notes
1	9	Viktoriia Us	Ukraine	Q
2	1	Stefanie Horn	Italy	Q
3	4	Eliška Mintálová	Slovakia	FLT (4)
4	12	Kimberley Woods	Great Britain	FLT (4)

Heat 2

Rank	Bib	Name	Country	Notes
1	2	Ricarda Funk	Germany	Q
2	10	Martina Wegman	Netherlands	Q
3	6	Elena Lilik	Germany	
4	15	Ajda Novak	Slovenia	

==== Final ====
Rank	Bib	Name	Country	Notes
1st place, gold medalist(s)	9	Viktoriia Us	Ukraine	
2nd place, silver medalist(s)	2	Ricarda Funk	Germany	
3rd place, bronze medalist(s)	1	Stefanie Horn	Italy	
4	10	Martina Wegman	Netherlands	FLT (8)

=== Final ranking (Top 16) ===
The top 16 ranking determined by the knockout rounds. Bib numbers correspond to qualification ranking.

Rank	Bib	Athlete	Country	Heat rank
1st place, gold medalist(s)	9	Viktoriia Us	Ukraine	1
2nd place, silver medalist(s)	2	Ricarda Funk	Germany	2
3rd place, bronze medalist(s)	1	Stefanie Horn	Italy	3
4	10	Martina Wegman	Netherlands	4
5	4	Eliška Mintálová	Slovakia	SF1 (3)
6	6	Elena Lilik	Germany	SF2 (3)
7	12	Kimberley Woods	Great Britain	SF1 (4)
8	15	Ajda Novak	Slovenia	SF2 (4)
9	3	Maialen Chourraut	Spain	QF3 (3)
10	7	Zuzana Paňková	Slovakia	QF4 (3)
11	13	Veronika Vojtová	Czech Republic	QF2 (3)
12	16	Mònica Dòria Vilarrubla	Andorra	QF1 (3)
13	5	Klaudia Zwolińska	Poland	QF2 (4)
14	8	Marjorie Delassus	France	QF1 (4)
15	11	Mallory Franklin	Great Britain	QF4 (4)
16	14	Alena Marx	Switzerland	QF3 (4)
