= 2025 ICF Canoe Slalom World Championships – Women's K1 team =

Women's kayak teams at the 2025 ICF Canoe Slalom World Championships
- Venue: Penrith Whitewater Stadium
- Location: Penrith, Australia
- Dates: 1 October 2025
- Competitors: 39 from 13 nations
- Teams: 13

Medalists
gold medal	Gabriela Satková; Lucie Nesnídalová; Antonie Galušková	Czech Republic
silver medal	Ricarda Funk; Elena Lilik; Emily Apel	Germany
bronze medal	Eva Alina Hočevar; Ajda Novak; Lea Novak	Slovenia

The women's kayak team event at the 2025 ICF Canoe Slalom World Championships took place on 1 October 2025 at Lee Valley White Water Centre in Penrith.

== Competition format ==
Team events use a single run format with the team with the fastest time including penalties awarded gold. Teams consist of three paddlers from the same country.

Penalties are accumulated for each athlete, such that a team can incur a total of 150 seconds of penalties on a single gate (if all three miss it) or 6 seconds (if all three touch it). The time begins when the first paddler crosses the start beam and ends when the last one crosses the finish beam. All three paddlers must cross the finish line within 15 seconds of each other or else incur an additional 50-second penalty.

The teams had to navigate a total of 20 gates along the course, including 6 upstream gates (2-7-10-11-15-20).

== Results ==
Rank	Bib	Country	Athletes	Result		
Rank	Bib	Country	Athletes	Time	Pen	Total
1st place, gold medalist(s)	4	Czech Republic	Gabriela Satková; Lucie Nesnídalová; Antonie Galušková	103.22	0	103.22
2nd place, silver medalist(s)	8	Germany	Ricarda Funk; Elena Lilik; Emily Apel	104.48	2	106.48
3rd place, bronze medalist(s)	5	Slovenia	Eva Alina Hočevar; Ajda Novak; Lea Novak	107.73	0	107.73
4	2	Spain	Maialen Chourraut; Laia Sorribes; Leire Goñi	107.57	2	109.57
5	1	Australia	Noemie Fox; Kate Eckhardt; Sarah Crosbee	107.85	2	109.85
6	10	United States	Evy Leibfarth; Ria Sribar; Marcella Altman	110.35	0	110.35
7	3	Great Britain	Kimberley Woods; Lois Leaver; Nikita Setchell	112.68	0	112.68
8	6	France	Camille Prigent; Eva Pietracha; Emma Vuitton	110.52	4	114.52
9	9	China	Li Shiting; Ren Ye; Xie Xueting	112.68	2	114.68
10	11	Slovakia	Soňa Stanovská; Emanuela Luknárová; Zuzana Paňková	112.82	4	116.82
11	7	Poland	Klaudia Zwolińska; Dominika Brzeska; Hanna Danek	112.89	6	118.89
12	13	Chinese Taipei	Chang Chu-han; Wu Ting-i; Chou Chih-chin	122.16	6	128.16
13	12	New Zealand	Kahlia Cullwick; Rosie Rex; Courtney Williams	120.34	54	174.34
