= 2026 ICF Canoe Slalom World Championships – Women's K1 team =

Women's kayak teams at the 2026 ICF Canoe Slalom World Championships
- Venue: RIVERSPORT OKC
- Location: Oklahoma City, Oklahoma, United States
- Dates: 21 July 2026
- Competitors: 39 from 13 nations
- Teams: 13

Medalists
| gold medal | Kate Eckhardt; Jessica Fox; Noemie Fox | Australia |
| silver medal | Emma Vuitton; Camille Prigent; Marjorie Delassus | France |
| bronze medal | Eliška Mintálová; Soňa Stanovská; Zuzana Paňková | Slovakia |

The women's kayak team event at the 2026 ICF Canoe Slalom World Championships took place on 21 July 2026 at RIVERSPORT OKC in Oklahoma City.

== Competition format ==
Team events use a single run format with the team with the fastest time including penalties awarded gold. Teams consist of three paddlers from the same country.

Penalties are accumulated for each athlete, such that a team can incur a total of 150 seconds of penalties on a single gate (if all three miss it) or 6 seconds (if all three touch it). The time begins when the first paddler crosses the start beam and ends when the last one crosses the finish beam. All three paddlers must cross the finish line within 15 seconds of each other or else incur an additional 50-second penalty.

The teams had to navigate a total of 18 gates along the course, including 6 upstream gates (5-7-11-14-17-18).

== Results ==
| Rank | Bib | Country | Athletes | Result | | |
| Rank | Bib | Country | Athletes | Time | Pen | Total |
|---|---|---|---|---|---|---|
| 1st place, gold medalist(s) | 4 | Australia | Kate Eckhardt; Jessica Fox; Noemie Fox | 97.87 | 0 | 97.87 |
| 2nd place, silver medalist(s) | 7 | France | Emma Vuitton; Camille Prigent; Marjorie Delassus | 98.51 | 0 | 98.51 |
| 3rd place, bronze medalist(s) | 9 | Slovakia | Eliška Mintálová; Soňa Stanovská; Zuzana Paňková | 96.72 | 4 | 100.72 |
| 4 | 6 | Great Britain | Kimberley Woods; Lois Leaver; Bethan Forrow | 100.43 | 2 | 102.43 |
| 5 | 10 | Poland | Klaudia Zwolińska; Dominika Brzeska; Hanna Danek | 100.49 | 2 | 102.49 |
| 6 | 1 | Czech Republic | Amálie Hilgertová; Kateřina Beková; Bára Galušková | 103.20 | 0 | 103.20 |
| 7 | 3 | Spain | Maialen Chourraut; Laia Sorribes; Leire Goñi | 100.68 | 4 | 104.68 |
| 8 | 2 | Germany | Ricarda Funk; Emily Apel; Annkatrin Plochmann | 106.13 | 0 | 106.13 |
| 9 | 5 | United States | Evy Leibfarth; Ria Sribar; Marcella Altman | 104.29 | 4 | 108.29 |
| 10 | 12 | Japan | Aki Yazawa; Mine Onozawa; Kurumi Ito | 106.19 | 4 | 110.19 |
| 11 | 8 | China | Li Shiting; Chen Lin; Xu Linxi | 109.39 | 2 | 111.39 |
| 12 | 11 | New Zealand | Martina Wegman; Courtney Williams; Kahlia Cullwick | 108.60 | 56 | 164.60 |
| 13 | 13 | Kazakhstan | Yekaterina Tarantseva; Anastassiya Ananyeva; Alua Mauletkan | 134.58 | 58 | 192.58 |
