= Ricarda Funk =

German slalom canoeist

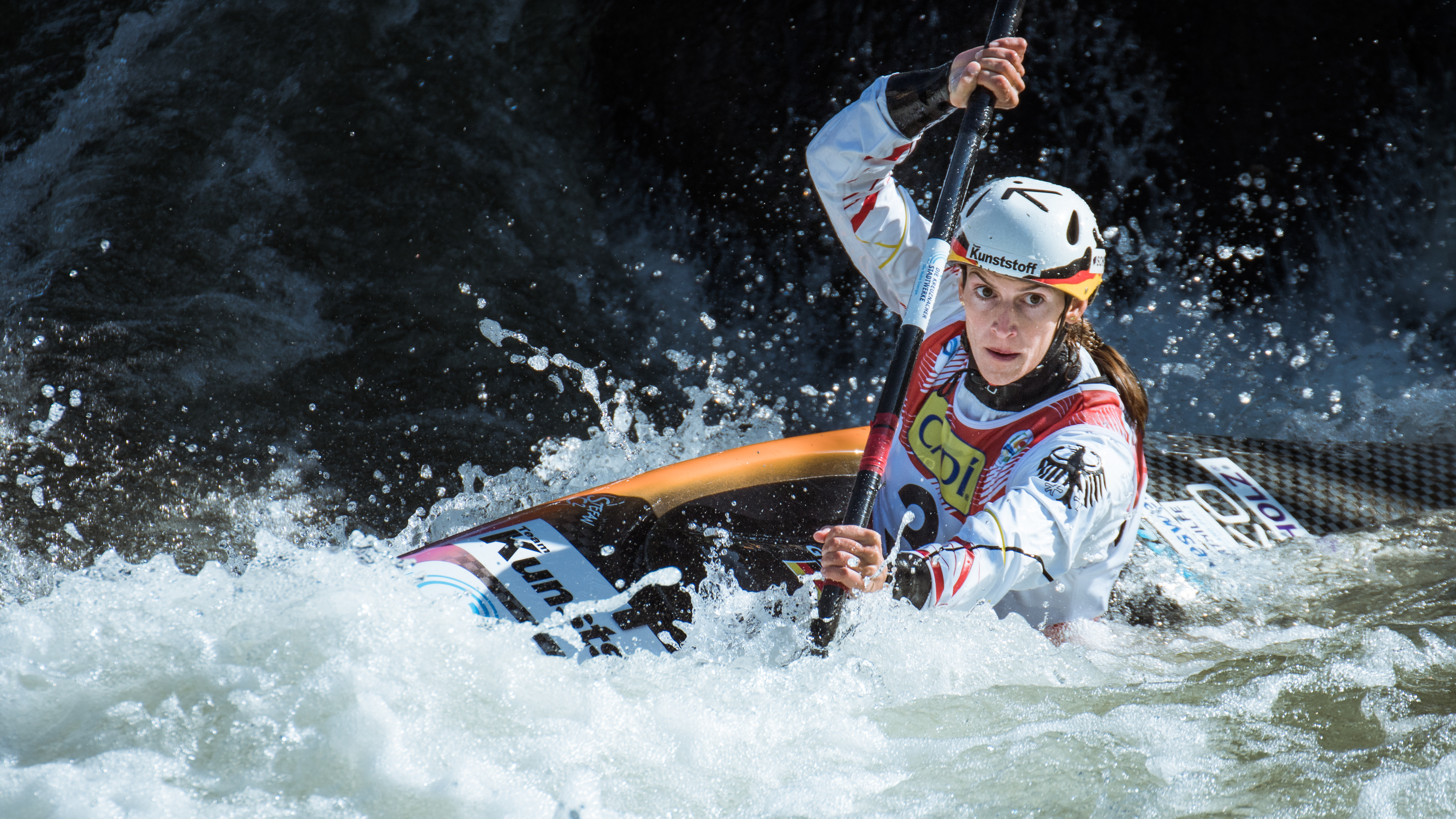
- Funk in 2019

Personal information
- Born: 15 April 1992 (age 34) Bad Neuenahr-Ahrweiler, Germany
- Height: 1.70 m (5 ft 7 in)
- Weight: 53 kg (117 lb)

Sport
- Country: Germany
- Sport: Canoe slalom
- Event: K1, Kayak cross
- Club: KSV Bad Kreuznach

Achievements and titles
- Highest world ranking: No. 1 (2017)
Medal record
Women's canoe slalom
Representing Germany
Event	1st	2nd	3rd
Olympic Games	1	0	0
World Championships	4	3	2
European Championships	5	3	2
U23 World Championships	0	1	0
U23 European Championships	2	0	2
Junior World Championships	0	1	1
Junior European Championships	2	0	1
Total	14	8	8
Olympic Games
Gold medal – first place	2020 Tokyo	K1
World Championships
Gold medal – first place	2017 Pau	K1 team
Gold medal – first place	2021 Bratislava	K1
Gold medal – first place	2022 Augsburg	K1
Gold medal – first place	2022 Augsburg	K1 team
Silver medal – second place	2015 London	K1
Silver medal – second place	2018 Rio de Janeiro	K1 team
Silver medal – second place	2025 Penrith	K1 team
Bronze medal – third place	2017 Pau	K1
Bronze medal – third place	2018 Rio de Janeiro	K1
European Games
Gold medal – first place	2023 Kraków	K1
Silver medal – second place	2023 Kraków	Kayak cross
Bronze medal – third place	2023 Kraków	K1 team
European Championships
Gold medal – first place	2014 Vienna	K1
Gold medal – first place	2018 Prague	K1
Gold medal – first place	2018 Prague	K1 team
Gold medal – first place	2025 Vaires-sur-Marne	K1
Silver medal – second place	2015 Markkleeberg	K1
Silver medal – second place	2019 Pau	K1 team
Bronze medal – third place	2021 Ivrea	K1
U23 World Championships
Silver medal – second place	2013 Liptovský Mikuláš	K1 team
U23 European Championships
Gold medal – first place	2012 Solkan	K1 team
Gold medal – first place	2013 Bourg-Saint-Maurice	K1
Bronze medal – third place	2011 Banja Luka	K1
Bronze medal – third place	2011 Banja Luka	K1 team
Junior World Championships
Silver medal – second place	2010 Foix	K1 team
Bronze medal – third place	2008 Roudnice nad Labem	K1 team
Junior European Championships
Gold medal – first place	2008 Solkan	K1 team
Gold medal – first place	2010 Markkleeberg	K1 team
Bronze medal – third place	2009 Liptovský Mikuláš	K1

Ricarda Funk (born 15 April 1992) is a German slalom canoeist who has competed at the international level since 2008, specializing in the K1 discipline and since 2021 also in kayak cross.

== Career ==
Funk won the gold medal in the K1 event at the delayed 2020 Tokyo Olympics. This gold medal came after the disappointment of 2016, when she failed to qualify for the Rio games after losing to Melanie Pfeifer in the internal German qualification. By winning the 2021 World K1 title as well as the Olympic K1 gold at the delayed Tokyo games, Funk became the first canoe slalom athlete to win both an Olympic and a World title in the same discipline in the same year. A feat that is unlikely to be repeated since the World Championships typically don't take place in Olympic years.

She also competed at the 2024 Summer Olympics in Paris, finishing 11th in the K1 event and 14th in kayak cross.

Funk won nine medals at the ICF Canoe Slalom World Championships including 5 individual medals. She won her first individual world K1 title in 2021 in Bratislava and then retained the title in 2022 in Augsburg. She also won silver in 2015 and two bronzes back-to-back in 2017 and 2018. The remaining three medals came from the K1 team events as part of the German team. These include two golds in 2017 and 2022 and two silvers in 2018 and 2025.

Funk won 10 medals (5 golds, 3 silvers and 2 bronzes) at the European Championships, including a gold, a silver and a bronze at the 2023 European Games in Kraków. Seven of these medals are in individual events (4 golds, 1 silver and 1 bronze in K1 and 1 silver in kayak cross). She was able to win the European K1 title in her first ever appearance at the 2014 European Canoe Slalom Championships in Vienna.

Funk won the overall World Cup title in the K1 class in 2016, 2017 and 2024 and in kayak cross in 2025. As of 2025 she has amassed 13 World Cup wins and 27 podiums.

Funk was the year-end World No. 1 in 2017.

== Career statistics ==
=== Major championships results timeline ===
Event		2014	2015	2016	2017	2018	2019	2020	2021	2022	2023	2024	2025	2026
Olympic Games	K1	Not held		—	Not held				1	Not held		11	Not held	
Olympic Games	Kayak cross	Not held										14	Not held	
World Championships	K1	5	2	Not held	3	3	5	Not held	1	1	7	Not held	4	5
World Championships	Kayak cross	Not held			—	—	—	Not held	13	7	10	Not held	6	4
World Championships	Kayak cross individual	Not held											34	6
World Championships	K1 team	5	14	Not held	1	2	7	Not held	—	1	8	Not held	2	8
European Championships	K1	1	2	—	13	1	9	—	3	14	1 (Note: 2023 European Games)	—	1	—
European Championships	Kayak cross	Not held							—	11	2	—	11	—
European Championships	Kayak cross individual	Not held										—	10	—
European Championships	K1 team	4	8	—	7	1	2	—	6	5	3	—	4	—

=== World Cup individual podiums ===
	1st place, gold medalist(s)	2nd place, silver medalist(s)	3rd place, bronze medalist(s)	Total
K1	13	5	7	25
Kayak cross	1	1	2	4
Kayak cross individual	1	2	0	3
Total	15	8	9	32

Season	Date	Venue	Position	Event
2012	26 August 2012	Prague	3rd	K1
2014	22 June 2014	Prague	1st	K1
2014	17 August 2014	Augsburg	1st	K1
2015	28 June 2015	Kraków	3rd	K1
2016	5 June 2016	Ivrea	1st	K1
2016	12 June 2016	La Seu d'Urgell	3rd	K1
2016	4 September 2016	Prague	1st	K1
2017	18 June 2017	Prague	3rd	K1
2017	25 June 2017	Augsburg	1st	K1
2017	2 July 2017	Markkleeberg	1st	K1
2017	3 September 2017	Ivrea	1st	K1
2017	10 September 2017	La Seu d'Urgell	1st	K1
2018	23 June 2018	Liptovský Mikuláš	3rd	K1
2018	8 September 2018	La Seu d'Urgell	1st	K1
2019	15 June 2019	Lee Valley	2nd	K1
2019	22 June 2019	Bratislava	3rd	K1
2019	31 August 2019	Markkleeberg	1st	K1
2021	19 June 2021	Markkleeberg	2nd	K1
2022	3 September 2022	La Seu d'Urgell	1st	K1
2023	9 June 2023	Prague	2nd	K1
2023	3 September 2023	La Seu d'Urgell	3rd	Kayak cross
2024	31 May 2024	Augsburg	2nd	K1
2024	7 June 2024	Prague	3rd	K1
2024	14 September 2024	Ivrea	2nd	K1
2025	13 June 2025	Pau	1st	K1
2025	7 September 2025	Augsburg	2nd	Kayak cross individual
2025	7 September 2025	Augsburg	1st	Kayak cross
2026	7 June 2026	Prague	2nd	Kayak cross individual
2026	7 June 2026	Prague	3rd	Kayak cross
2026	12 June 2026	Augsburg	1st	K1
2026	14 June 2026	Augsburg	1st	Kayak cross individual
2026	5 September 2026	Vaires-sur-Marne	2nd	Kayak cross
