= Simona Glejteková =

Slovak slalom canoeist (born 1999)

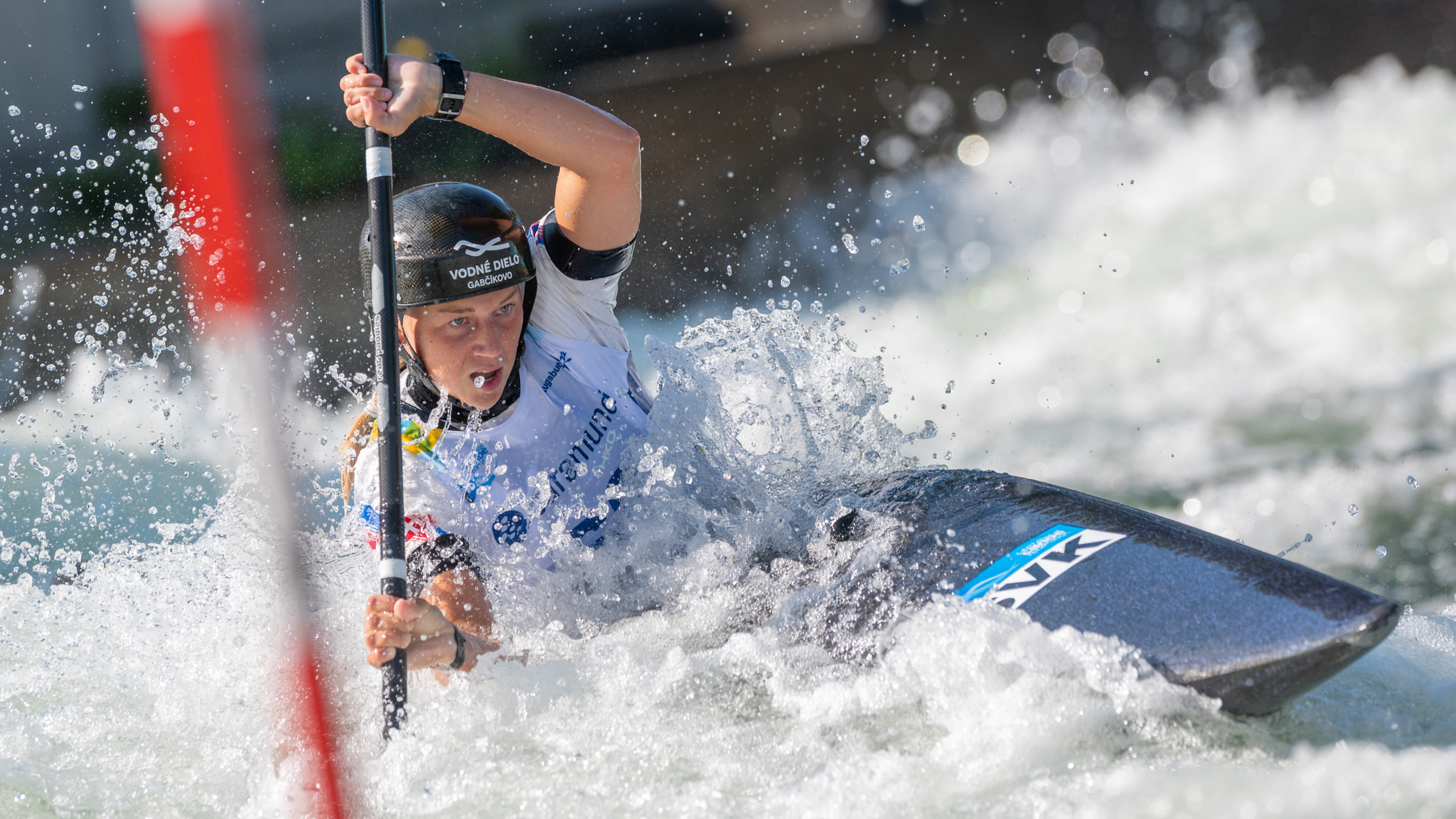

Personal information
- Nationality: Slovak
- Born: 2 April 1999 (age 27)
- Years active: 2014 -

Sport
- Country: Slovakia
- Sport: Canoe slalom
- Event: C1, K1
Medal record
Women's canoe slalom
Representing Slovakia
European Championships
Gold medal – first place	2021 Ivrea	C1 team
U23 World Championships
Bronze medal – third place	2021 Tacen	C1 team
U23 European Championships
Bronze medal – third place	2018 Bratislava	C1 team
Junior World Championships
Silver medal – second place	2016 Kraków	C1 team
Silver medal – second place	2017 Bratislava	C1 team
Junior European Championships
Gold medal – first place	2016 Solkan	C1 team
Gold medal – first place	2017 Hohenlimburg	C1 team
Bronze medal – third place	2015 Kraków	C1 team

Simona Glejteková (born 2 April 1999) is a Slovak slalom canoeist who has competed at the international level since 2014, specializing primarily in the C1 discipline, with occasional starts in K1.

Glejteková won a gold medal in the C1 team event at the 2021 European Championships in Ivrea.

== Major championships results timeline ==
Event		2017	2018	2019	2020	2021	2022
World Championships	C1	36	—	—	Not held	22	—
World Championships	K1	—	—	—	Not held	—	51
World Championships	C1 team	8	—	—	Not held	5	—
World Championships	K1 team	—	—	—	Not held	—	5
European Championships	C1	28	—	—	—	31	—
European Championships	K1	—	—	—	—	—	35
European Championships	C1 team	7	—	—	—	1	—
European Championships	K1 team	—	—	—	—	—	7
