= 2022 ICF Canoe Slalom World Championships – Women's K1 team =

Women's kayak teams at the 2022 ICF Canoe Slalom World Championships
- Venue: Augsburg Eiskanal
- Location: Augsburg, Germany
- Dates: 27 July 2022
- Competitors: 48 from 16 nations
- Teams: 16

Medalists
gold medal	Ricarda Funk; Elena Lilik; Jasmin Schornberg	Germany
silver medal	Eva Terčelj; Eva Alina Hočevar; Ajda Novak	Slovenia
bronze medal	Klaudia Zwolińska; Natalia Pacierpnik; Dominika Brzeska	Poland

The women's kayak team event at the 2022 ICF Canoe Slalom World Championships took place on 27 July 2022 at the Augsburg Eiskanal in Augsburg.

== Competition format ==
Team events use a single run format with the team with the fastest time including penalties awarded gold. Teams consist of three paddlers from the same country.

Penalties are accumulated for each athlete, such that a team can incur a total of 150 seconds of penalties on a single gate (if all three miss it) or 6 seconds (if all three touch it). The time begins when the first paddler crosses the start beam and ends when the last one crosses the finish beam. All three paddlers must cross the finish line within 15 seconds of each other or else incur an additional 50-second penalty.

Team events are generally contested on the same gate setup as the qualification heats of the individual events.

== Results ==
Rank	Bib	Country	Athletes	Result		
Rank	Bib	Country	Athletes	Time	Pen	Total
1st place, gold medalist(s)	12	Germany	Ricarda Funk; Elena Lilik; Jasmin Schornberg	102.78	0	102.78
2nd place, silver medalist(s)	4	Slovenia	Eva Terčelj; Eva Alina Hočevar; Ajda Novak	105.26	0	105.26
3rd place, bronze medalist(s)	5	Poland	Klaudia Zwolińska; Natalia Pacierpnik; Dominika Brzeska	107.25	2	109.25
4	2	Czech Republic	Barbora Valíková; Tereza Fišerová; Antonie Galušková	109.17	2	111.17
5	3	Slovakia	Eliška Mintálová; Zuzana Paňková; Simona Glejteková	110.44	4	114.44
6	6	Spain	Maialen Chourraut; Laia Sorribes; Julia Cuchi	110.35	6	116.35
7	13	Netherlands	Claudia Leenders; Martina Wegman; Lena Teunissen	112.36	4	116.36
8	1	Great Britain	Kimberley Woods; Mallory Franklin; Megan Hamer-Evans	110.73	8	118.73
9	11	United States	Evy Leibfarth; Ria Sribar; Marcella Altman	113.64	6	119.64
10	9	China	Yan Jiahua; Li Tong; Zou Xiaolin	118.79	4	122.79
11	8	Japan	Aki Yazawa; Ren Mishima; Kurumi Ito	114.54	12	126.54
12	7	France	Camille Prigent; Romane Prigent; Emma Vuitton	101.17	52	153.17
13	10	Australia	Jessica Fox; Noemie Fox; Kate Eckhardt	105.34	56	161.34
14	15	Canada	Léa Baldoni; Lois Betteridge; Florence Maheu	116.41	68	184.41
15	16	Hungary	Sára Tímea Seprenyi; Zita Mária Lakner; Luca Török	164.56	236	400.56
-	14	India	Shikha Chouhan; Bhumi Baghel; Priyanshi Raja Bundela	DNS		
