= 2025 ICF Canoe Slalom World Championships – Women's C1 =

Women's canoe at the 2025 ICF Canoe Slalom World Championships
- Venue: Penrith Whitewater Stadium
- Location: Penrith, Australia
- Dates: 30 September–2 October 2025
- Competitors: 50 from 23 nations

Medalists
| gold medal | Klaudia Zwolińska | Poland |
| silver medal | Alsu Minazova | Individual Neutral Athletes |
| bronze medal | Ana Sátila | Brazil |

The women's canoe event at the 2025 ICF Canoe Slalom World Championships took place on 2 October 2025 at the Penrith Whitewater Stadium in Penrith, with the qualification heats on 30 September 2025.

== Competition format ==
The event uses a three-round format with qualification heats, semifinal and final. The top 30 paddlers from the single qualification run qualify for the semifinal. Paddlers start in the reverse order of their qualification position in the semifinal and complete a single run, with the top 12 advancing to the final. The start list for the final is once again in reverse order of the semifinal results. The athlete with the best time in the single-run final is awarded gold.

A penalty of 2 seconds is awarded for touching a gate and a 50-second penalty is awarded for missing a gate or negotiating it in the opposite direction.

The qualification course had 22 gates including 6 upstream gates (2-7-10-11-15-21). The semifinal and final course had 25 gates with 6 upstream gates (4-5-11-12-20-24).

== Schedule ==
The final was moved forward from 15:16 to 13:36 due to threat of high winds.

All times listed are UTC+10.

| Date | Time | Round |
|---|---|---|
30 September 2025
| 30 September 2025 | 11:51 | Heats |
2 October 2025
| 2 October 2025 | 11:38 | Semifinal |
| 2 October 2025 | 13:36 | Final |

== Results ==
Penalties are included in the time shown. The fastest time in each round is shown in bold.

| Rank | Bib | Canoeist | Nation | Heats | | | Semifinal | | | Final | | |
| Rank | Bib | Canoeist | Nation | Time | Pen | Rank | Time | Pen | Rank | Time | Pen | Rank |
|---|---|---|---|---|---|---|---|---|---|---|---|---|
| 1 | 22 | Klaudia Zwolińska | Poland | 107.11 | 2 | 17 | 114.47 | 0 | 2 | **108.49** | 0 | 1 |
| 2 | 35 | Alsu Minazova | Individual Neutral Athletes | 108.34 | 2 | 26 | 117.28 | 0 | 10 | 112.88 | 2 | 2 |
| 3 | 3 | Ana Sátila | Brazil | 105.74 | 4 | 13 | 114.65 | 2 | 3 | 112.98 | 2 | 3 |
| 4 | 10 | Evy Leibfarth | United States | 105.07 | 2 | 10 | 116.60 | 0 | 7 | 113.09 | 0 | 4 |
| 5 | 14 | Martina Satková | Czech Republic | 105.47 | 2 | 11 | 117.03 | 0 | 9 | 113.94 | 2 | 5 |
| 6 | 6 | Zuzana Paňková | Slovakia | 103.96 | 0 | 5 | 116.45 | 2 | 6 | 114.09 | 2 | 6 |
| 7 | 1 | Gabriela Satková | Czech Republic | 104.07 | 2 | 6 | 115.45 | 0 | 5 | 115.00 | 2 | 7 |
| 8 | 2 | Kimberley Woods | Great Britain | 102.10 | 0 | 2 | **112.84** | 0 | 1 | 115.52 | 4 | 8 |
| 9 | 15 | Noemie Fox | Australia | 104.44 | 4 | 7 | 116.78 | 2 | 8 | 117.28 | 0 | 9 |
| 10 | 7 | Mònica Dòria | Andorra | 105.88 | 4 | 14 | 115.04 | 2 | 4 | 118.22 | 6 | 10 |
| 11 | 11 | Viktoriia Us | Ukraine | 108.98 | 2 | 29 | 118.73 | 0 | 12 | 118.83 | 2 | 11 |
| 12 | 9 | Eva Alina Hočevar | Slovenia | 104.47 | 2 | 8 | 118.12 | 2 | 11 | 119.20 | 4 | 12 |
| 13 | 4 | Andrea Herzog | Germany | 103.89 | 2 | 4 | 118.95 | 4 | 13 | did not advance | | |
| 14 | 19 | Alena Marx | Switzerland | 108.10 | 2 | 24 | 119.41 | 0 | 14 | did not advance | | |
| 15 | 5 | Elena Lilik | Germany | 105.55 | 0 | 12 | 120.44 | 4 | 15 | did not advance | | |
| 16 | 26 | Bethan Forrow | Great Britain | 105.98 | 0 | 16 | 120.76 | 2 | 16 | did not advance | | |
| 17 | 25 | Alja Kozorog | Slovenia | 107.40 | 0 | 19 | 121.38 | 2 | 17 | did not advance | | |
| 18 | 27 | Ellis Miller | Great Britain | 107.33 | 0 | 18 | 121.90 | 4 | 18 | did not advance | | |
| 19 | 13 | Miren Lazkano | Spain | 105.03 | 4 | 9 | 124.07 | 8 | 19 | did not advance | | |
| 20 | 28 | Lena Teunissen | Netherlands | 107.71 | 2 | 21 | 124.90 | 2 | 20 | did not advance | | |
| 21 | 40 | Wu Yishan | China | 109.32 | 2 | 30 | 124.97 | 4 | 21 | did not advance | | |
| 22 | 16 | Marta Bertoncelli | Italy | 107.62 | 2 | 20 | 125.76 | 4 | 22 | did not advance | | |
| 23 | 24 | Emanuela Luknárová | Slovakia | 107.99 | 0 | 23 | 127.39 | 4 | 23 | did not advance | | |
| 24 | 32 | Lea Novak | Slovenia | 107.84 | 2 | 22 | 132.94 | 6 | 24 | did not advance | | |
| 25 | 48 | Taisiia Logacheva | Individual Neutral Athletes | 108.49 | 2 | 28 | 136.35 | 8 | 25 | did not advance | | |
| 26 | 17 | Doriane Delassus | France | 103.63 | 0 | 3 | 172.13 | 54 | 26 | did not advance | | |
| 27 | 8 | Angèle Hug | France | 105.91 | 2 | 15 | 172.27 | 50 | 27 | did not advance | | |
| 28 | 21 | Elena Borghi | Italy | 108.41 | 2 | 27 | 175.69 | 54 | 28 | did not advance | | |
| 29 | 30 | Adriana Morenová | Czech Republic | 108.16 | 2 | 25 | 180.18 | 50 | 29 | did not advance | | |
| 30 | 12 | Núria Vilarrubla | Spain | **101.83** | 0 | 1 | 182.02 | 60 | 30 | did not advance | | |
| 31 | 20 | Soňa Stanovská | Slovakia | 110.66 | 2 | 31 | did not advance | | | | | |
| 32 | 34 | Huang Juan | China | 111.05 | 8 | 32 | did not advance | | | | | |
| 33 | 18 | Nele Bayn | Germany | 112.48 | 2 | 33 | did not advance | | | | | |
| 34 | 36 | Omira Estácia Neta | Brazil | 113.13 | 2 | 34 | did not advance | | | | | |
| 35 | 31 | Aleksandra Góra | Poland | 115.19 | 4 | 35 | did not advance | | | | | |
| 36 | 39 | Michaela Corcoran | Ireland | 115.62 | 4 | 36 | did not advance | | | | | |
| 37 | 41 | Liu Gaoyi | China | 115.93 | 4 | 37 | did not advance | | | | | |
| 38 | 37 | Georgia O'Callaghan | Australia | 116.16 | 4 | 38 | did not advance | | | | | |
| 39 | 33 | Lucie Prioux | France | 117.37 | 4 | 39 | did not advance | | | | | |
| 40 | 38 | Marcella Altman | United States | 125.70 | 8 | 40 | did not advance | | | | | |
| 41 | 44 | Laura Plata | Colombia | 125.76 | 6 | 41 | did not advance | | | | | |
| 42 | 45 | Chung Yu-han | Chinese Taipei | 127.33 | 8 | 42 | did not advance | | | | | |
| 43 | 49 | Hanna Danek | Poland | 129.28 | 2 | 43 | did not advance | | | | | |
| 44 | 50 | Elina Garifianova | Individual Neutral Athletes | 141.46 | 6 | 44 | did not advance | | | | | |
| 45 | 47 | Ana Paula Fernandes Castro | Paraguay | 149.96 | 6 | 45 | did not advance | | | | | |
| 46 | 29 | Kate Eckhardt | Australia | 157.94 | 54 | 46 | did not advance | | | | | |
| 47 | 43 | Rosie Rex | New Zealand | 168.62 | 4 | 47 | did not advance | | | | | |
| 48 | 23 | Klara Olazabal | Spain | 169.75 | 52 | 48 | did not advance | | | | | |
| 49 | 46 | Chou Chih-chin | Chinese Taipei | 176.47 | 52 | 49 | did not advance | | | | | |
| 50 | 42 | Kahlia Cullwick | New Zealand | 176.95 | 4 | 50 | did not advance | | | | | |
