= 2016 World Junior and U23 Canoe Slalom Championships =

Canoeing championship

The 2016 ICF World Junior and U23 Canoe Slalom Championships took place in Kraków, Poland from 12 to 17 July 2016 under the auspices of the International Canoe Federation (ICF) at the Kraków-Kolna Canoe Slalom Course. It was the 18th edition of the competition for Juniors (U18) and the 5th edition for the Under 23 category. No medals were awarded for the junior C2 team event and the U23 C2 team event due to low number of participating nations.

== Medal summary ==
=== Men ===
==== Canoe ====
===== Junior =====
Event	Gold	Points	Silver	Points	Bronze	Points
C1	Marko Mirgorodský (SVK)	89.68	Matyáš Lhota (CZE)	92.36	Gregor Kreul (GER)	94.83
C1 team	Germany; Gregor Kreul; Lennard Tuchscherer; Paul Seumel	105.39	Russia; Pavel Kotov; Dmitrii Khramtsov; Mikhail Kruglov	108.33	France; Nicolas Gestin; Theo Roisin; Valentin Marteil	112.43
C2	Albert Kašpar/Vojtěch Mrůzek (CZE)	105.99	Lennard Tuchscherer/Fritz Lehrach (GER)	106.32	Jakub Brzeziński/Kacper Sztuba (POL)	108.65
C2 team (non-medal event)	Czech Republic; Albert Kašpar/Vojtěch Mrůzek; Jan Vrublovský/Petr Novotný; Vojtěch Heger/Tomáš Heger	128.15	Germany; Lennard Tuchscherer/Fritz Lehrach; Eric Borrmann/Leo Braune; Paul Seumel/Hannes Seumel	139.31	Poland; Jakub Brzeziński/Kacper Sztuba; Krzysztof Zych/Wojciech Klata; Marcin Janur/Artur Kolat	146.51

===== U23 =====
Event	Gold	Points	Silver	Points	Bronze	Points
C1	Florian Breuer (GER)	87.88	Lukáš Rohan (CZE)	89.06	Kirill Setkin (RUS)	90.43
C1 team	France; Cédric Joly; Thibault Blaise; Erwan Marchais	100.52	Great Britain; Ryan Westley; Samuel Ibbotson; William Smith	107.72	Germany; Florian Breuer; Dennis Söter; Florian Beste	107.78
C2	Filip Brzeziński/Andrzej Brzeziński (POL)	95.93	Michał Wiercioch/Grzegorz Majerczak (POL)	96.90	Yves Prigent/Loïc Kervella (FRA)	100.11
C2 team (non-medal event)	Russia; Vadim Voinalovich/Aleksei Popov; Igor Mikhailov/Nikolay Shkliaruk; Dmitriy Azanov/Egor Gover	124.16	Poland; Filip Brzeziński/Andrzej Brzeziński; Michał Wiercioch/Grzegorz Majerczak; Michał Woś/Hubert Wawryk	141.04	Czech Republic; Michael Matějka/Jan Větrovský; Jan Mrázek/Tomáš Rousek; Mikuláš Zapletal/Vojtěch Zapletal	145.93

==== Kayak ====
===== Junior =====
Event	Gold	Points	Silver	Points	Bronze	Points
K1	Ruslan Pestov (UKR)	84.27	Felix Oschmautz (AUT)	84.98	Wiktor Sandera (POL)	85.62
K1 team	France; Thomas Durand; Paul Cornut-Chauvinc; Malo Quéméneur	98.33	Germany; Thomas Strauss; Noah Hegge; Lukas Stahl	99.58	Czech Republic; Tomáš Zima; Jan Mrázek; Vilém Kořínek	101.74

===== U23 =====
Event	Gold	Points	Silver	Points	Bronze	Points
K1	Jakub Grigar (SVK)	79.55	Zeno Ivaldi (ITA)	82.79	Andrej Málek (SVK)	83.34
K1 team	Germany; Stefan Hengst; Leo Bolg; Samuel Hegge	96.63	Slovakia; Jakub Grigar; Andrej Málek; Richard Macúš	97.42	Spain; Jordi Cadena; Telmo Olazabal; Unai Nabaskues	98.19

=== Women ===
==== Canoe ====
===== Junior =====
Event	Gold	Points	Silver	Points	Bronze	Points
C1	Tereza Fišerová (CZE)	108.08	Andrea Herzog (GER)	108.11	Kira Kubbe (GER)	108.66
C1 team	Russia; Alsu Minazova; Anastasia Kozyreva; Daria Shaidurova	136.41	Slovakia; Simona Glejteková; Soňa Stanovská; Simona Maceková	141.52	France; Marjorie Delassus; Fanchon Janssen; Azénor Philip	144.49

===== U23 =====
Event	Gold	Points	Silver	Points	Bronze	Points
C1	Jessica Fox (AUS)	101.72	Kimberley Woods (GBR)	105.04	Viktoria Wolffhardt (AUT)	107.23
C1 team	Great Britain; Kimberley Woods; Jasmine Royle; Eilidh Gibson	132.01	France; Lucie Prioux; Cécile Tixier; Laurine Naveau	134.76	Australia; Jessica Fox; Noemie Fox; Georgia Rankin	139.24

==== Kayak ====
===== Junior =====
Event	Gold	Points	Silver	Points	Bronze	Points
K1	Klaudia Zwolińska (POL)	96.30	Laia Sorribes (ESP)	97.25	Antonie Galušková (CZE)	99.32
K1 team	Czech Republic; Tereza Fišerová; Antonie Galušková; Kateřina Dušková	118.51	France; Romane Prigent; Fanchon Janssen; Léa Turmeau	120.19	Poland; Klaudia Zwolińska; Sara Ćwik; Kinga Czernek	125.21

===== U23 =====
Event	Gold	Points	Silver	Points	Bronze	Points
K1	Jessica Fox (AUS)	91.29	Karolína Galušková (CZE)	94.40	Lisa Fritsche (GER)	95.70
K1 team	Germany; Lisa Fritsche; Caroline Trompeter; Selina Jones	110.59	Czech Republic; Karolína Galušková; Amálie Hilgertová; Barbora Valíková	111.61	France; Lucie Baudu; Camille Prigent; Solène Graille	117.84

== Medal table ==
Rank	Nation	Gold	Silver	Bronze	Total
1	Germany (GER)	4	3	4	11
2	Czech Republic (CZE)	3	4	2	9
3	France (FRA)	2	2	4	8
4	Slovakia (SVK)	2	2	1	5
5	Poland (POL)	2	1	3	6
6	Australia (AUS)	2	0	1	3
7	Great Britain (GBR)	1	2	0	3
8	Russia (RUS)	1	1	1	3
9	Ukraine (UKR)	1	0	0	1
10	Austria (AUT)	0	1	1	2
10	Spain (ESP)	0	1	1	2
12	Italy (ITA)	0	1	0	1
Totals (12 entries)		18	18	18	54
