= Zuzana Paňková =

Slovak canoeist (born 2004)

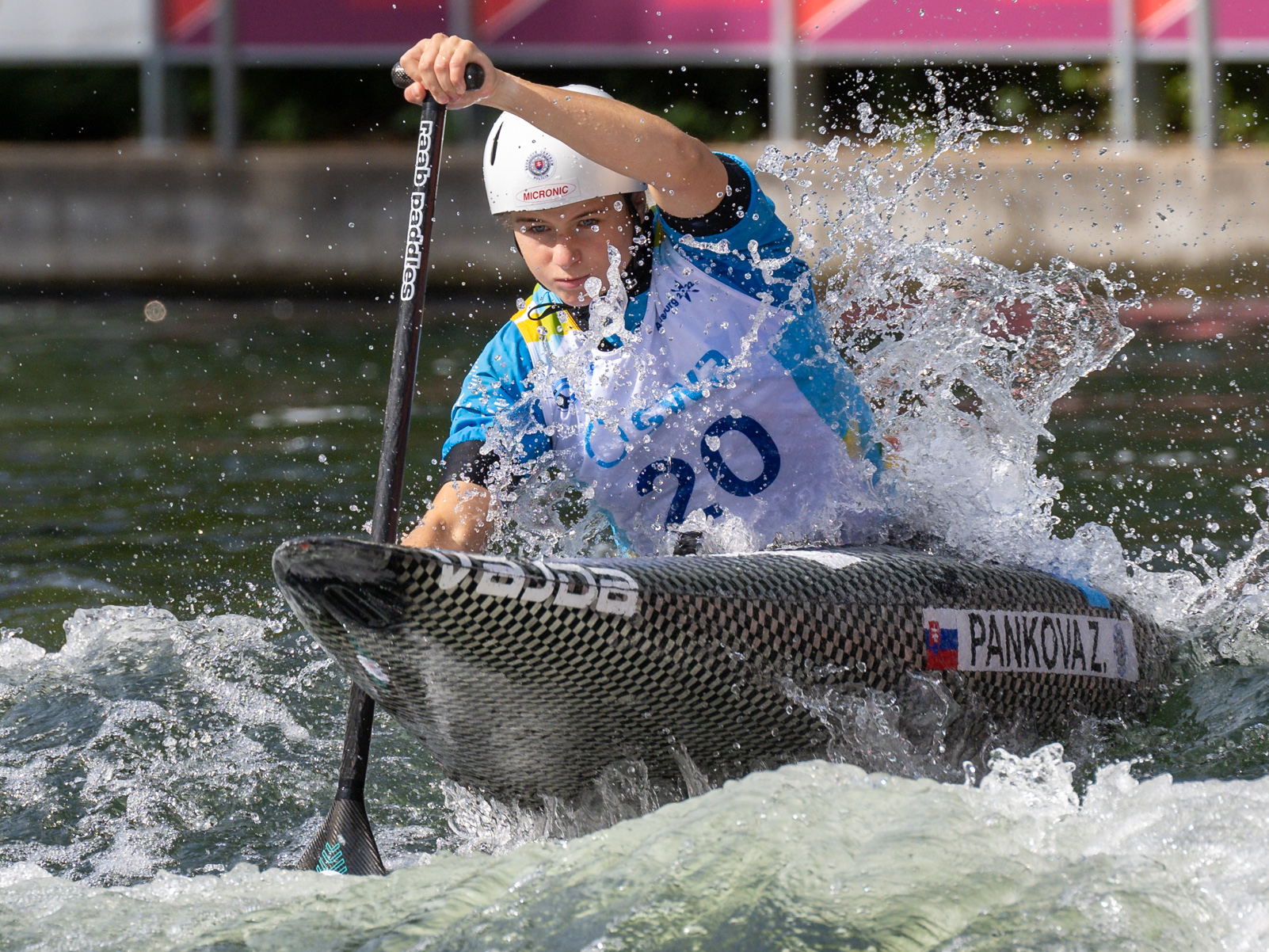
- Paňková at the 2022 World Championships

Personal information
- Born: 25 November 2004 (age 21) Košice, Slovakia
- Height: 157 cm (5 ft 2 in)
- Weight: 53 kg (117 lb)

Sport
- Country: Slovakia
- Sport: Canoe slalom
- Event: C1, K1, Kayak cross
- Club: TJ Slávia UVLF Košice
Medal record
Women's canoe slalom
Representing Slovakia
World Championships
Gold medal – first place	2026 Oklahoma City	C1 team
Bronze medal – third place	2026 Oklahoma City	K1 team
European Championships
Gold medal – first place	2021 Ivrea	C1 team
Gold medal – first place	2022 Liptovský Mikuláš	C1 team
Gold medal – first place	2026 Ivrea	K1 team
Silver medal – second place	2024 Tacen	K1
Bronze medal – third place	2025 Vaires-sur-Marne	K1
U23 World Championships
Gold medal – first place	2025 Foix	Kayak cross individual
Silver medal – second place	2025 Foix	C1
U23 European Championships
Silver medal – second place	2023 Bratislava	C1
Silver medal – second place	2023 Bratislava	Kayak cross
Silver medal – second place	2023 Bratislava	C1 team
Silver medal – second place	2023 Bratislava	K1 team
Junior World Championships
Gold medal – first place	2022 Ivrea	C1
Silver medal – second place	2019 Kraków	C1 team
Silver medal – second place	2022 Ivrea	Kayak cross
Silver medal – second place	2022 Ivrea	K1 team
Bronze medal – third place	2021 Tacen	K1
Bronze medal – third place	2021 Tacen	C1 team
Bronze medal – third place	2022 Ivrea	C1 team
Junior European Championships
Gold medal – first place	2021 Solkan	C1
Gold medal – first place	2021 Solkan	K1
Gold medal – first place	2021 Solkan	K1 team
Bronze medal – third place	2021 Solkan	Kayak cross
Bronze medal – third place	2019 Liptovský Mikuláš	C1 team
Bronze medal – third place	2019 Liptovský Mikuláš	K1 team

Zuzana Paňková (born 25 November 2004) is a Slovak slalom canoeist who has competed at the international level since 2019.

She represented Slovakia at the 2024 Summer Olympics in Paris.

== Career ==
Paňková won two medals at the 2026 ICF Canoe Slalom World Championships in Oklahoma City with a gold in C1 team and a bronze in K1 team.

She also won five medals (3 golds, 1 silver and 1 bronze) at the European Championships. She won the first of those medals at the age of 16. She won her first world cup medal in 2022 in Pau at the age of 17. She won the only individual medal for Slovakia at the 2024 European Canoe Slalom Championships in Tacen, Slovenia by finishing second in K1.

Paňková qualified for the 2024 Summer Olympics in C1 after reaching the final round at 2023 World Cup race in Vaires-sur-Marne.

She made her Olympic debut at the 2024 Summer Olympics in Paris, finishing 4th in the C1 event and 35th in kayak cross.

Paňková finished 15th in the overall standings of the C1 event in the 2022 Canoe Slalom World Cup, 5th in 2023 and 2nd 2025.

Paňková has won medals across all three disciplines (canoe, kayak and kayak cross) at the junior and under 23 level. She contributed to 4 out of 5 medals won by Slovakia at the 2023 European Junior and U23 Canoe Slalom Championships in Bratislava, winning silver medals in C1, C1 team, K1 team and Kayak cross.

Her first kayak was originally owned by the Olympic gold medalist Elena Kaliská.

== Career statistics ==
=== Major championships results timeline ===
Event		2021	2022	2023	2024	2025	2026
Olympic Games	C1	—	Not held		4	Not held	
Olympic Games	Kayak cross	Not held			35	Not held	
World Championships	C1	18	18	8	Not held	6	6
World Championships	K1	—	28	—	Not held	8	6
World Championships	Kayak cross	—	14	19	Not held	22	8
World Championships	Kayak cross individual	Not held				18	21
World Championships	C1 team	5	6	5	Not held	4	1
World Championships	K1 team	—	5	—	Not held	10	3
European Championships	C1	19	12	5 (Note: 2023 European Games)	19	8	4
European Championships	K1	—	25	—	2	3	8
European Championships	Kayak cross	—	16	10	NQ	NQ	NQ
European Championships	Kayak cross individual	Not held			26	34	36
European Championships	C1 team	1	1	6	6	6	4
European Championships	K1 team	—	7	—	7	9	1

=== World Cup individual podiums ===
Season	Date	Venue	Position	Event
2022	28 August 2022	Pau	2nd	C1
2025	28 June 2025	Prague	1st	C1
2026	5 June 2026	Prague	3rd	K1
2026	4 September 2026	Vaires-sur-Marne	1st	C1
