= Soňa Stanovská =

Slovak slalom canoeist (born 2000)

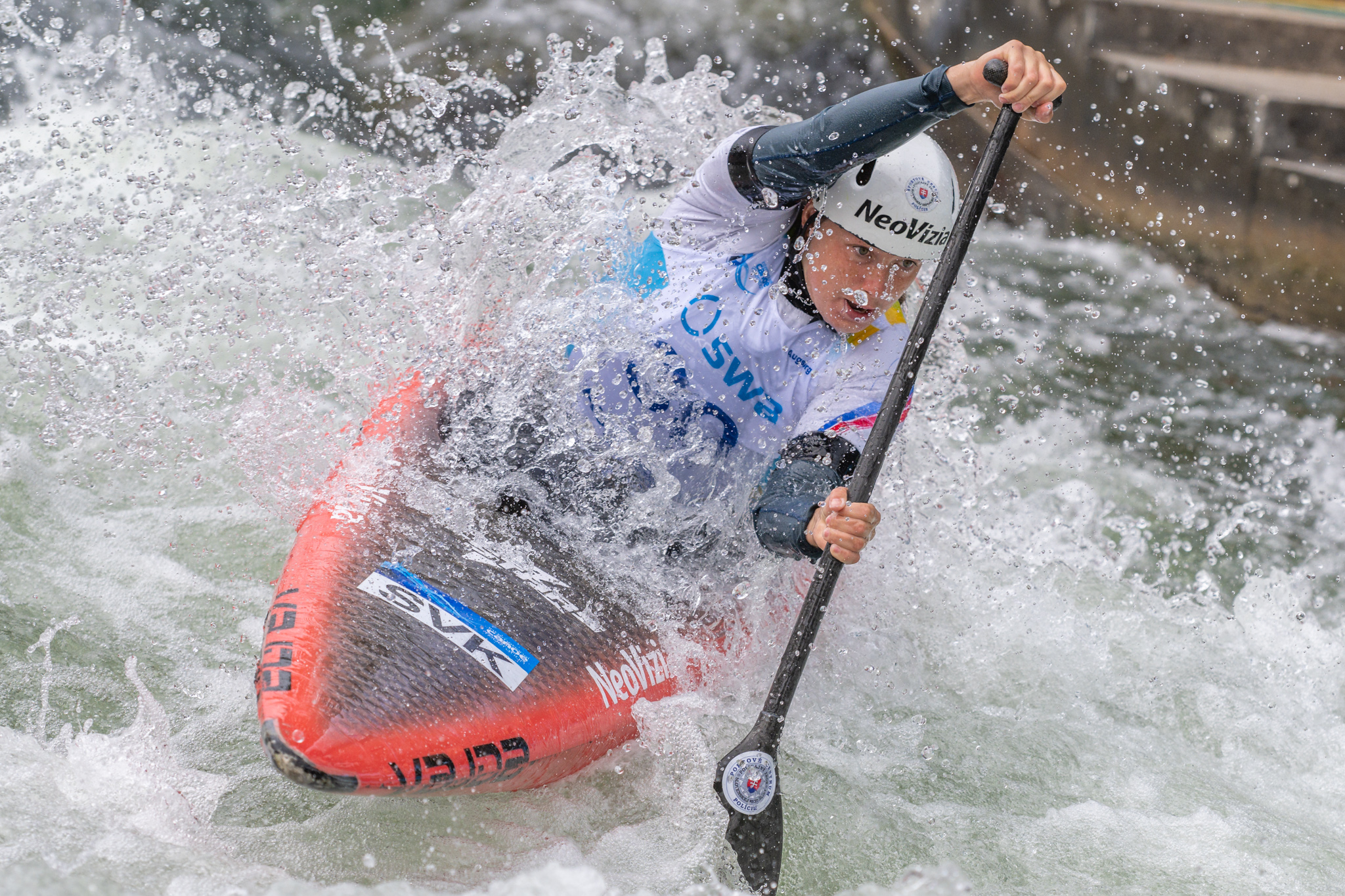
- Soňa Stanovská performing at 2022 ICF Canoe Slalom World Championships in Augsburg, Germany

Personal information
- Nationality: Slovak
- Born: 27 February 2000 (age 26) Dolný Kubín, Slovakia
- Height: 162 cm (5 ft 4 in)
- Weight: 57 kg (126 lb)

Sport
- Country: Slovakia
- Sport: Canoe slalom
- Events: C1, K1, Kayak cross, Mixed C2
Medal record
Women's canoe slalom
Representing Slovakia
World Championships
Gold medal – first place	2026 Oklahoma City	C1 team
Bronze medal – third place	2021 Bratislava	K1 team
Bronze medal – third place	2026 Oklahoma City	K1 team
European Championships
Gold medal – first place	2022 Liptovský Mikuláš	C1 team
Gold medal – first place	2026 Ivrea	K1 team
U23 World Championships
Gold medal – first place	2023 Kraków	C1
Silver medal – second place	2021 Tacen	K1 team
Bronze medal – third place	2021 Tacen	C1 team
U23 European Championships
Gold medal – first place	2021 Solkan	K1 team
Silver medal – second place	2019 Liptovský Mikuláš	K1 team
Silver medal – second place	2021 Solkan	K1
Silver medal – second place	2023 Bratislava	C1 team
Silver medal – second place	2023 Bratislava	K1 team
Bronze medal – third place	2019 Liptovský Mikuláš	C1 team
Junior World Championships
Silver medal – second place	2016 Kraków	C1 team
Silver medal – second place	2017 Bratislava	C1
Silver medal – second place	2017 Bratislava	C1 team
Silver medal – second place	2018 Ivrea	K1
Bronze medal – third place	2017 Bratislava	K1 team
Bronze medal – third place	2018 Ivrea	C1
Junior European Championships
Gold medal – first place	2016 Solkan	C1 team
Gold medal – first place	2017 Hohenlimburg	C1 team
Silver medal – second place	2016 Solkan	K1 team
Silver medal – second place	2018 Bratislava	C1
Silver medal – second place	2018 Bratislava	C1 team
Bronze medal – third place	2015 Kraków	C1 team

Soňa Stanovská (born 27 February 2000) is a Slovak slalom canoeist who has competed at the international level since 2015. She competes in C1, K1 and kayak cross. She also competed in Mixed C2 with Ján Bátik in the 2018 season.

== Career ==
Stanovská won three medals at the ICF Canoe Slalom World Championships with a gold (C1 team: 2026) and two bronzes (K1 team: 2021, 2026).

She won a gold medal in the C1 team event at the 2022 European Championships in Liptovský Mikuláš and another gold in the K1 team event at the 2026 European Championships in Ivrea.

Stanovská has won six medals at the World Junior Championships, with four silvers (C1 team: 2016, 2017; C1: 2017; K1: 2018) and two bronzes (K1 team: 2017; C1: 2018). She also has three medals from the Under 23 World Championships, with a gold (C1: 2023, a silver (K1 team: 2021) and a bronze (C1 team: 2021).

She has 6 medals from the European Junior Championships (2 gold, 3 silver and 1 bronze) and 6 from the European Under 23 Championships (1 gold, 4 silver and 1 bronze).

She was coached by her father Miroslav Stanovský earlier in her career. As of 2025 she is coached by former world champion Jana Dukátová.

== Career statistics ==
=== Major championships results timeline ===
Event		2016	2017	2018	2019	2020	2021	2022	2023	2024	2025	2026
World Championships	C1	Not held	—	10	44	Not held	—	20	18	Not held	31	16
World Championships	K1	Not held	—	—	—	Not held	20	—	10	Not held	13	16
World Championships	Kayak cross	Not held	—	15	—	Not held	18	41	36	Not held	19	7
World Championships	Kayak cross individual	Not held									16	9
World Championships	Mixed C2	Not held	—	5	—	Not held						
World Championships	C1 team	Not held	—	5	4	Not held	—	6	5	Not held	4	1
World Championships	K1 team	Not held	—	—	—	Not held	3	—	11	Not held	10	3
European Championships	C1	11	15	17	25	—	—	24	11 (Note: 2023 European Games)	25	15	20
European Championships	K1	—	—	—	—	—	—	—	29	9	4	10
European Championships	Kayak cross	Not held					—	15	27	8	22	19
European Championships	Kayak cross individual	Not held								4	27	22
European Championships	C1 team	4	7	6	6	—	—	1	6	6	6	4
European Championships	K1 team	—	—	—	—	—	—	—	7	7	9	1

=== World Cup individual podiums ===
Season	Date	Venue	Position	Event
2018	23 June 2018	Liptovský Mikuláš	1st	Mixed C2
2018	30 June 2018	Kraków	2nd	Mixed C2
2018	31 August 2018	Tacen	3rd	C1
2025	6 June 2025	La Seu d'Urgell	1st	K1
2025	29 June 2025	Prague	3rd	Kayak cross individual
