= 2026 ICF Canoe Slalom World Championships – Women's C1 team =

Women's canoe teams at the 2026 ICF Canoe Slalom World Championships
- Venue: RIVERSPORT OKC
- Location: Oklahoma City, Oklahoma, United States
- Dates: 22 July 2026
- Competitors: 30 from 10 nations
- Teams: 10

Medalists
| gold medal | Zuzana Paňková; Soňa Stanovská; Emanuela Luknárová | Slovakia |
| silver medal | Tereza Kneblová; Martina Satková; Adriana Morenová | Czech Republic |
| bronze medal | Angèle Hug; Doriane Delassus; Marjorie Delassus | France |

The women's canoe team event at the 2026 ICF Canoe Slalom World Championships took place on 22 July 2026 at RIVERSPORT OKC in Oklahoma City.

== Competition format ==
Team events use a single run format with the team with the fastest time including penalties awarded gold. Teams consist of three paddlers from the same country.

Penalties are accumulated for each athlete, such that a team can incur a total of 150 seconds of penalties on a single gate (if all three miss it) or 6 seconds (if all three touch it). The time begins when the first paddler crosses the start beam and ends when the last one crosses the finish beam. All three paddlers must cross the finish line within 15 seconds of each other or else incur an additional 50-second penalty.

The teams had to navigate a total of 18 gates along the course, including 6 upstream gates (5-7-11-14-17-18).

== Results ==
| Rank | Bib | Country | Athletes | Result | | |
| Rank | Bib | Country | Athletes | Time | Pen | Total |
|---|---|---|---|---|---|---|
| 1st place, gold medalist(s) | 4 | Slovakia | Zuzana Paňková; Soňa Stanovská; Emanuela Luknárová | 105.16 | 0 | 105.16 |
| 2nd place, silver medalist(s) | 1 | Czech Republic | Tereza Kneblová; Martina Satková; Adriana Morenová | 105.39 | 0 | 105.39 |
| 3rd place, bronze medalist(s) | 5 | France | Angèle Hug; Doriane Delassus; Marjorie Delassus | 105.81 | 0 | 105.81 |
| 4 | 3 | Great Britain | Mallory Franklin; Kimberley Woods; Ellis Miller | 106.98 | 0 | 106.98 |
| 5 | 8 | Spain | Núria Vilarrubla; Miren Lazkano; Klara Olazabal | 108.86 | 0 | 108.86 |
| 6 | 6 | Slovenia | Eva Alina Hočevar; Lea Novak; Alja Kozorog | 108.73 | 2 | 110.73 |
| 7 | 2 | Germany | Andrea Herzog; Nele Bayn; Lucie Krech | 109.26 | 4 | 113.26 |
| 8 | 7 | China | Huang Juan; Yang Ting; Chen Shi | 113.89 | 2 | 115.89 |
| 9 | 10 | United States | Evy Leibfarth; Marcella Altman; Carden Oetting | 117.93 | 0 | 117.93 |
| 10 | 9 | Kazakhstan | Anastassiya Ananyeva; Yekaterina Tarantseva; Alua Mauletkan | 144.39 | 4 | 148.39 |
