= Marjorie Delassus =

French canoeist (born 1998)

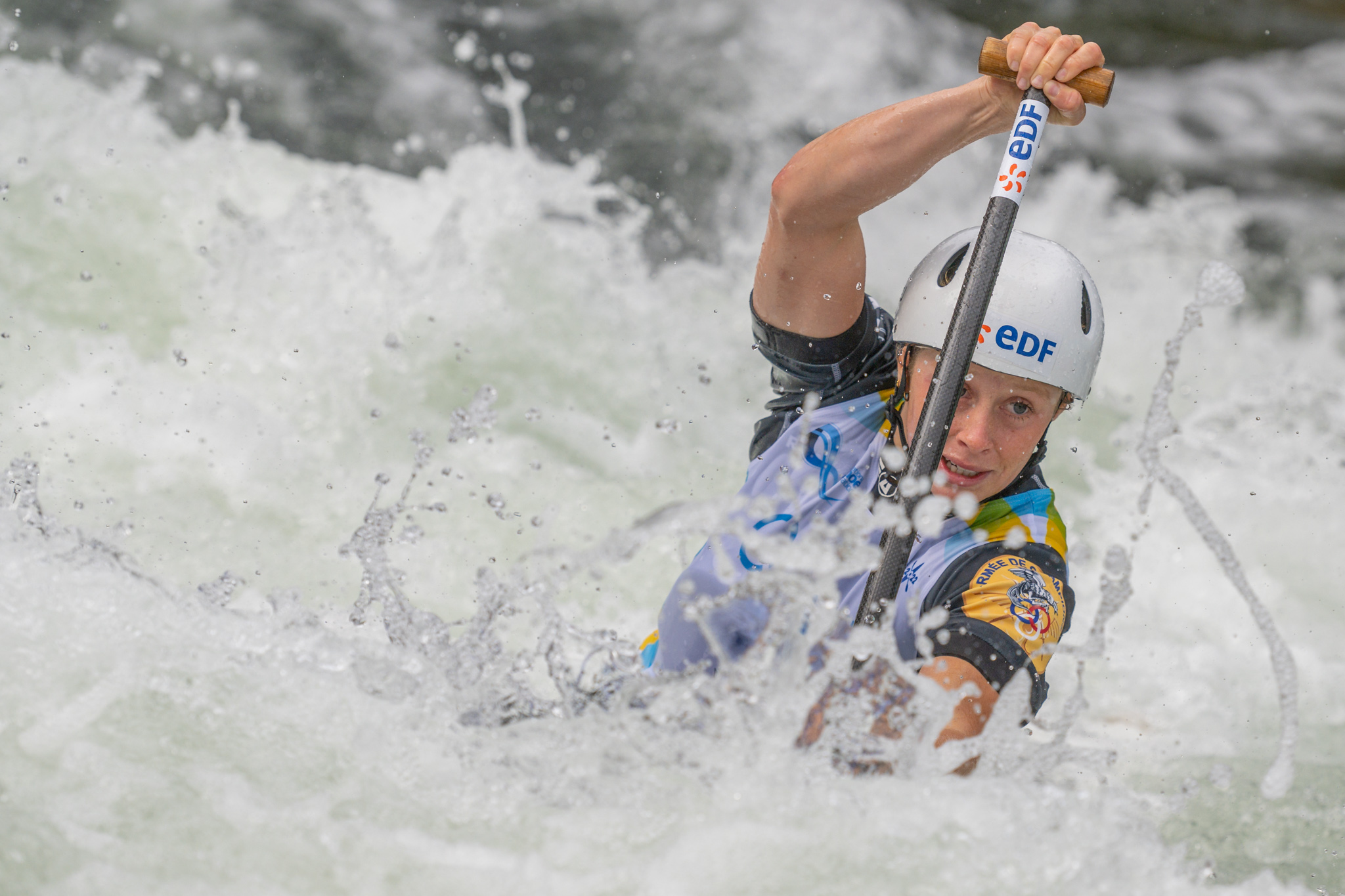
- Marjorie Delassus performing at 2022 ICF Canoe Slalom World Championships in Augsburg, Germany

Personal information
- Nationality: French
- Born: 26 March 1998 (age 28) Pau, Pyrénées-Atlantiques

Sport
- Country: France
- Sport: Canoe slalom
- Event: C1, K1
Medal record
Women's canoe slalom
Representing France
World Championships
Silver medal – second place	2026 Oklahoma City	K1 team
Bronze medal – third place	2026 Oklahoma City	C1 team
European Games
Gold medal – first place	2023 Kraków	K1 team
European Championships
Silver medal – second place	2020 Prague	K1 team
Silver medal – second place	2022 Liptovský Mikuláš	C1
Silver medal – second place	2022 Liptovský Mikuláš	C1 team
Silver medal – second place	2026 Ivrea	C1 team
Bronze medal – third place	2021 Ivrea	C1 team
Bronze medal – third place	2024 Tacen	C1
Bronze medal – third place	2026 Ivrea	K1 team
U23 World Championships
Gold medal – first place	2019 Kraków	K1 team
Silver medal – second place	2019 Kraków	C1 team
U23 European Championships
Gold medal – first place	2019 Liptovský Mikuláš	C1
Gold medal – first place	2019 Liptovský Mikuláš	C1 team
Gold medal – first place	2018 Bratislava	K1 team
Silver medal – second place	2018 Bratislava	C1 team
Junior World Championships
Bronze medal – third place	2016 Kraków	C1 team
Junior European Championships
Bronze medal – third place	2016 Solkan	C1 team

Marjorie Delassus (born 26 March 1998) is a French slalom canoeist who has competed at the international level since 2016. She is from Pau in Béarn.

== Career ==
Delassus competed at two Olympic games. At the delayed 2020 Summer Olympics in Tokyo she finished fourth in the C1 event. She also finished 13th in the C1 event at the 2024 Summer Olympics in Paris.

Delassus won two medals at the 2026 ICF Canoe Slalom World Championships in Oklahoma City, with a silver in K1 team and a bronze in C1 team.

She won a total of 8 medals (1 gold, 4 silvers and 3 bronzes) at the European Championships, including a gold in the K1 team event at the 2023 European Games in Kraków. At the 2020 European Championships, she won a silver medal in the K1 team event alongside Camille Prigent and Lucie Baudu. At the 2021 European Championships she won the C1 team bronze medal with Lucie Prioux and Angèle Hug.

She won the overall World Cup title in kayak cross individual in 2026.

Delassus was the World Under-23 Champion in 2019 in K1 team, European Under-23 Champion in 2018 in K1 team and in 2019 in C1 and C1 team. In 2019 she finished fourth in the C1 event at the U23 World Championships and in October 2020, she qualified for the delayed 2020 Tokyo Olympics.

In April 2021 she became the French champion on the course that was later used for the 2024 Paris Olympics.

== Personal life ==
Her brother, Anatole, and sister, Doriane, are both also slalom canoeists.

== Results ==
=== World Cup individual podiums ===
Season	Date	Venue	Position	Event
2022	19 June 2022	Kraków	2nd	C1
2026	7 June 2026	Prague	3rd	Kayak cross individual
2026	5 September 2026	Vaires-sur-Marne	2nd	Kayak cross individual
2026	10 September 2026	La Seu d'Urgell	1st	Kayak cross individual

=== Complete World Cup results ===
Year	Class	WC1	WC2	WC3	WC4	WC5	Points	Position
2017	C1	Prague (Czech Republic)	Augsburg (Germany)	Markkleeberg (Germany); 28	Ivrea (Italy)	La Seu (Spain)	9	51st
2018	C1	Liptovský Mikuláš (Slovakia)	Kraków (Poland)	Augsburg (Germany); 12	Tacen (Slovenia); 8	La Seu (Spain); 17	121	19th
2018	K1	Liptovský Mikuláš (Slovakia)	Kraków (Poland)		23		19	49th
2019	C1	Lee Valley (United Kingdom)	Bratislava (Slovakia)	Tacen (Slovenia); 11	Markkleeberg (Germany); 20	Prague (Czech Republic)	55	37th
2019	K1	Lee Valley (United Kingdom)	Bratislava (Slovakia)	30		Prague (Czech Republic)	5	71st
2020	C1	Tacen (Slovenia); 4	Pau (France); 11				N/A^{[a]}	
2020	K1	6					N/A^{[a]}	
2021	C1	Prague (Czech Republic); 13	Markkleeberg (Germany); 26	La Seu (Spain); 22	Pau (France); 16		118	16th

Notes
^{a} No overall rankings were determined by the ICF, with only two races possible due to the COVID-19 pandemic.
