= Alsu Minazova =

Russian canoeist

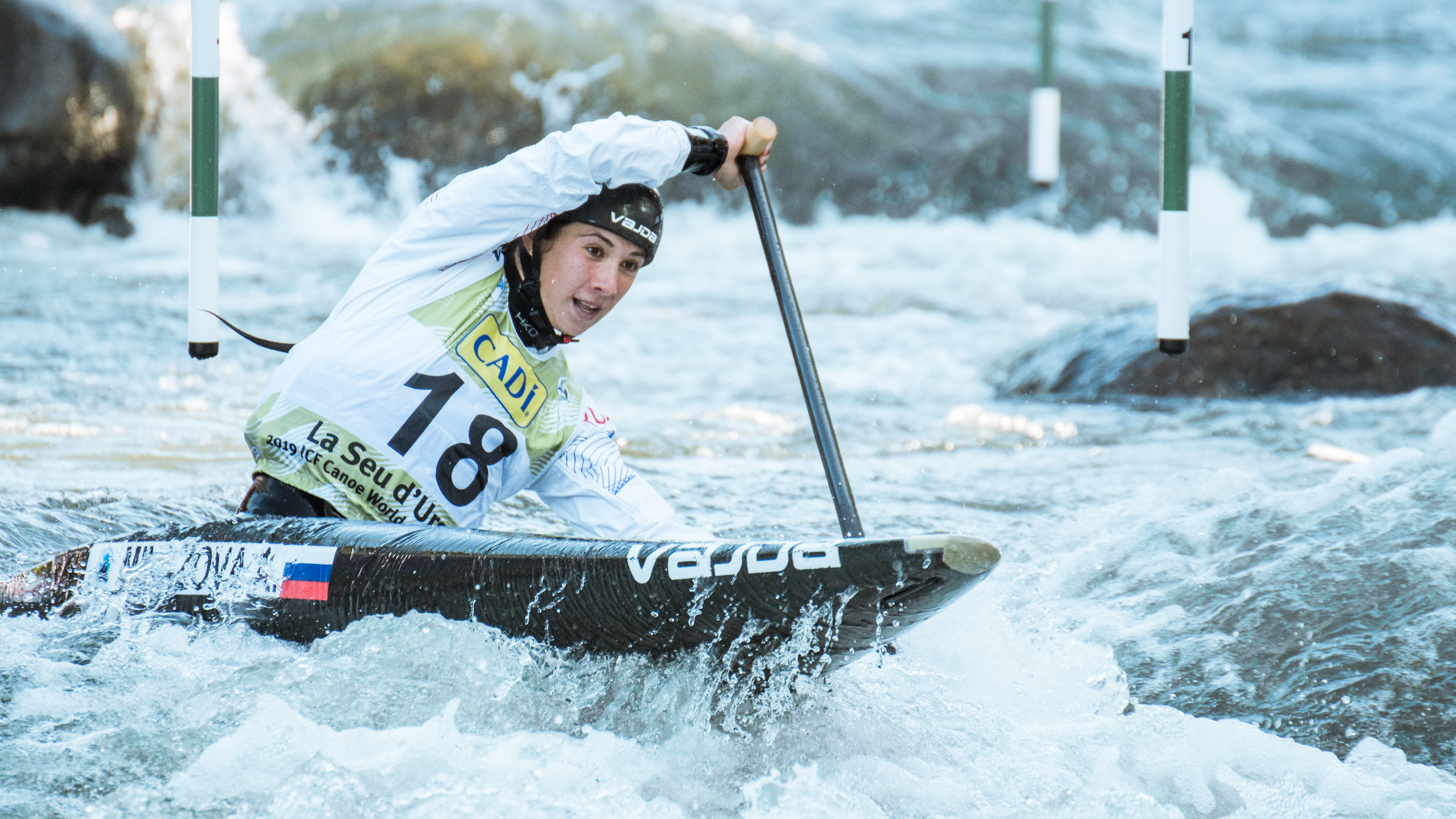

Personal information
- Nationality: Russian
- Born: 4 July 1998 (age 27) Ufa, Russia

Sport
- Country: Russia
- Sport: Canoe slalom
- Event(s): C1, K1, Kayak cross, Mixed C2
Medal record
Women's canoe slalom
Representing Russia
World Championships
Bronze medal – third place	2019 La Seu d'Urgell	K1 team
U23 World Championships
Gold medal – first place	2017 Bratislava	Mixed C2
Silver medal – second place	2019 Kraków	C1
U23 European Championships
Gold medal – first place	2020 Kraków	K1 team
Bronze medal – third place	2020 Kraków	C1 team
Bronze medal – third place	2021 Solkan	Extreme K1
Junior World Championships
Gold medal – first place	2016 Kraków	C1 team
Junior European Championships
Bronze medal – third place	2016 Solkan	K1 team
Representing RCF
World Championships
Bronze medal – third place	2021 Bratislava	C1 team
Representing Individual Neutral Athletes
World Championships
Silver medal – second place	2025 Penrith	C1

Alsu Filyusovna Minazova (Russian: Алсу Филюсовна Миназова; born 4 July 1998) is a Russian slalom canoeist of Tatar descent, who has competed at the international level since 2014.

She won three medals at the ICF Canoe Slalom World Championships, with one silver (C1: 2025) and two bronzes (C1 team: 2021, K1 team: 2019).

Minazova competed at the 2020 Summer Olympics in Tokyo where she started in both women's events. She finished 17th in the K1 event and 14th in the C1 event, after being eliminated in the semifinals on both occasions.

== World Cup individual podiums ==
Season	Date	Venue	Position	Event
2018	24 June 2018	Liptovský Mikuláš	3rd	Kayak cross
2019	15 June 2019	Lee Valley	1st	Kayak cross
2020	17 October 2020	Tacen	1st	Kayak cross
