= Angèle Hug =

French slalom canoeist

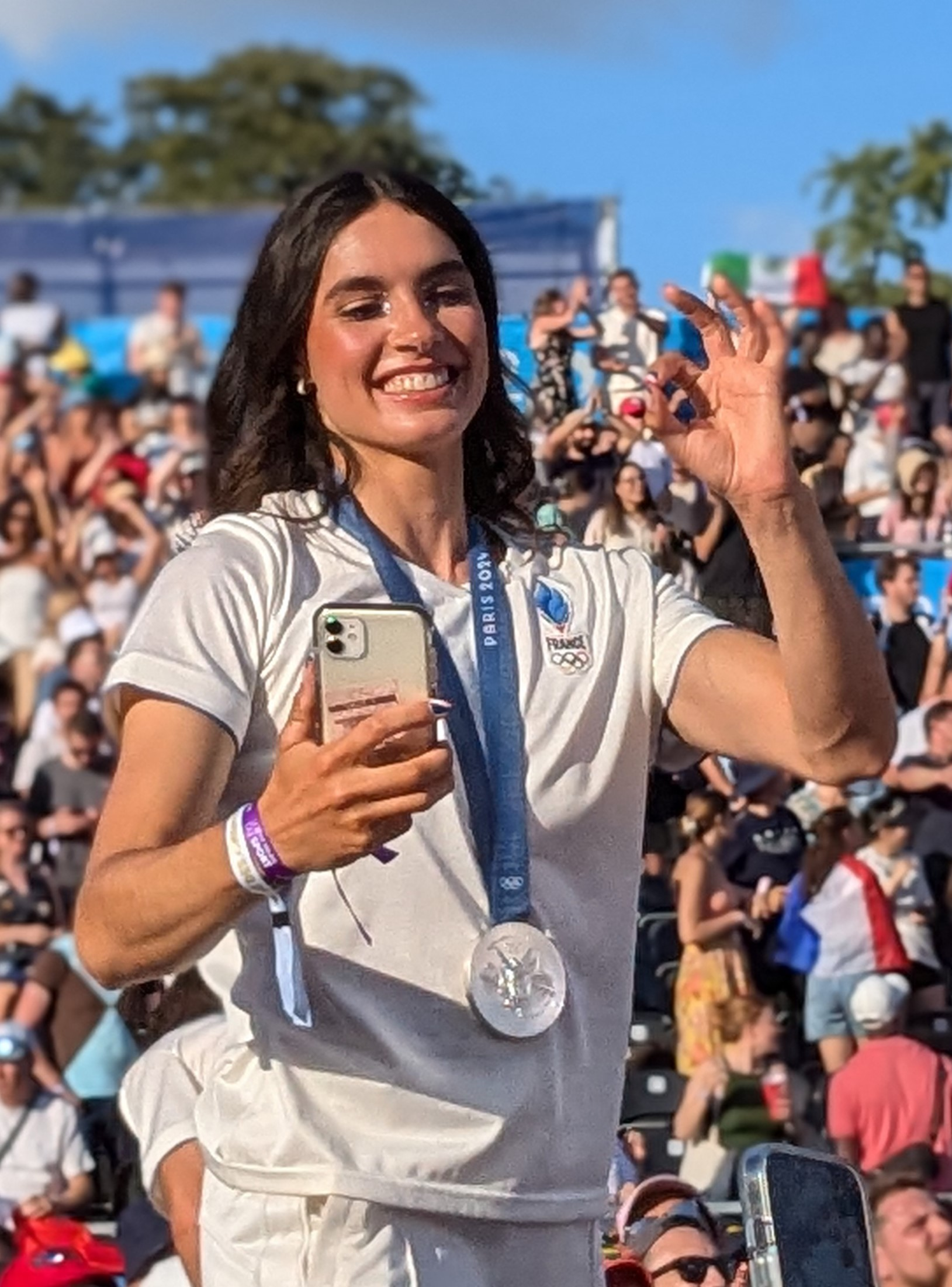
- Hug in 2024

Personal information
- Full name: Angèle Elisa Hug
- Nationality: French
- Born: 30 July 2000 (age 26) Guilherand-Granges, Ardèche, France
- Home town: Les Ollières-sur-Eyrieux, Ardèche, France

Sport
- Country: France
- Sport: Canoe slalom
- Rank: No. 48 (C1); No. 102 (K1)
- Events: C1, K1, Kayak cross, Mixed C2
- Club: Eyrieux Canoe Kayak
Medal record
Women's canoe slalom
Representing France
Olympic Games
Silver medal – second place	2024 Paris	Kayak cross
World Championships
Gold medal – first place	2025 Penrith	Kayak cross
Bronze medal – third place	2026 Oklahoma City	C1 team
European Championships
Silver medal – second place	2025 Vaires-sur-Marne	Kayak cross individual
Silver medal – second place	2025 Vaires-sur-Marne	C1 team
Silver medal – second place	2026 Ivrea	C1 team
Bronze medal – third place	2021 Ivrea	C1 team
U23 World Championships
Gold medal – first place	2021 Tacen	K1 team
Silver medal – second place	2021 Tacen	C1 team
Silver medal – second place	2023 Kraków	Kayak cross
Silver medal – second place	2023 Kraków	C1 team
Bronze medal – third place	2017 Bratislava	Mixed C2
Bronze medal – third place	2022 Ivrea	K1 team
U23 European Championships
Silver medal – second place	2022 České Budějovice	K1
Silver medal – second place	2022 České Budějovice	K1 team
Junior World Championships
Bronze medal – third place	2018 Ivrea	C1 team

Angèle Elisa Hug (born 30 July 2000) is a French slalom canoeist who has competed at the international level since 2017. She competes in the C1, K1 and kayak cross, and also competed in C2 Mixed with Théo Roisin in 2017. She is from Les Ollières-sur-Eyrieux in the Ardèche department of France.

== Career ==
Hug won a silver medal in the kayak cross event at the 2024 Summer Olympic in Paris.

She also won two medals at the ICF Canoe Slalom World Championships with a gold in kayak cross in 2025 and a bronze in C1 team in 2026.

Hug won four medals (three silvers and one bronze) at the European Championships.

She finished 2nd in domestic selections for the C1 event at the 2020 Tokyo Olympics, becoming Olympic substitute and securing a spot on the World Cup team. At her first World Cup in Pau, Hug placed 8th after qualifying third fastest into the final.

At the 2021 European Championships in Ivrea, she won a bronze medal in the C1 team event, placing 16th individually. Hug finished 4th in the mixed C2 event at the 2017 World Championships in Pau.

She finished 5th in the 2021 World Cup standings for C1, making two finals. At the 2021 U23 World Championships in Tacen, Hug finished 4th in K1 and 5th in C1. At the 2021 U23 Europeans, she finished 6th in both events.

Hug has won six medals at the U23 World Championships with a gold in K1 team (2021), three silvers (kayak cross 2023, C1 team: 2021, 2023) and two bronzes (mixed C2: 2017, K1 team: 2022).

== Results ==
=== World Cup individual podiums ===
Season	Date	Venue	Position	Event
2023	3 June 2023	Augsburg	2nd	C1
2024	9 June 2024	Prague	1st	Kayak cross^{1}
2024	22 September 2024	La Seu d'Urgell	3rd	Kayak cross
2025	8 June 2025	La Seu d'Urgell	1st	Kayak cross
2025	14 June 2025	Pau	3rd	C1
2025	7 September 2025	Augsburg	3rd	Kayak cross individual
2026	31 May 2026	Tacen	2nd	Kayak cross individual
2026	31 May 2026	Tacen	3rd	Kayak cross
2026	10 September 2026	La Seu d'Urgell	3rd	Kayak cross individual

^{1} 2024 Olympic qualifier. Did not count for World Cup rankings.

=== Complete World Cup results ===
Year	WC1	WC2	WC3	WC4	WC5	Points	Position
2020	Tacen (Slovenia)	Pau (France); 8				N/A^{[a]}	
2021	Prague (Czech Republic); 5	Markkleeberg (Germany); 13	La Seu (Spain); 10	Pau (France); 11		172	5th

Notes
^{a} No overall rankings were determined by the ICF, with only two races possible due to the COVID-19 pandemic.
