= 2022 European Canoe Slalom Championships =

2022 European Championships
- Venue: Ondrej Cibak Whitewater Slalom Course
- Location: Liptovský Mikuláš, Slovakia
- Dates: 26 to 29 May 2022

The 2022 European Canoe Slalom Championships took place from 26 to 29 May in Liptovský Mikuláš, Slovakia under the auspices of the European Canoe Association (ECA). It was the 23rd edition of the competition. Liptovský Mikuláš hosted the event for the third time after 2007 and 2016.

A total of 10 medal events took place, 6 individual and 4 team events. The women's K1 event had two gold medalists after Eliška Mintálová and Stefanie Horn achieved the same time in the final run. This was the first time that there was a tie for any medal at the European Championships.

Almost 200 athletes from 27 countries participated in the event. Russia and Belarus were excluded from participation due to the 2022 Russian invasion of Ukraine.

== Medals Table ==
* Host nation (Slovakia)

Rank	Nation	Gold	Silver	Bronze	Total
1	Czech Republic	3	0	2	5
2	Slovakia*	2	0	0	2
3	Great Britain	1	2	1	4
4	France	1	2	0	3
5	Germany	1	1	1	3
6	Italy	1	1	0	2
7	Slovenia	1	0	1	2
8	Switzerland	1	0	0	1
9	Poland	0	2	1	3
10	Austria	0	1	2	3
11	Spain	0	0	2	2
Totals (11 entries)		11	9	10	30

== Medal summary ==
=== Men ===
==== Canoe ====
Event	Gold		Silver		Bronze	
C1	Benjamin Savšek; Slovenia	100.44	Sideris Tasiadis; Germany	101.01	Miquel Travé; Spain	102.17
C1 team	Germany; Sideris Tasiadis; Franz Anton; Timo Trummer	107.94	Poland; Grzegorz Hedwig; Kacper Sztuba; Michał Wiercioch	110.88	Spain; Luis Fernández; Miquel Travé; Ander Elosegi	112.39

==== Kayak ====
Event	Gold		Silver		Bronze	
K1	Jiří Prskavec; Czech Republic	96.35	Giovanni De Gennaro; Italy	97.67	Felix Oschmautz; Austria	99.45
K1 team	Czech Republic; Jiří Prskavec; Ondřej Tunka; Vít Přindiš	99.40	Poland; Michał Pasiut; Jakub Brzeziński; Dariusz Popiela	101.09	Germany; Hannes Aigner; Noah Hegge; Stefan Hengst	101.47
Extreme Canoe Slalom	Jan Rohrer; Switzerland		Mario Leitner; Austria		Felix Oschmautz; Austria	

=== Women ===
==== Canoe ====
Event	Gold		Silver		Bronze	
C1	Mallory Franklin; Great Britain	113.35	Marjorie Delassus; France	115.07	Tereza Fišerová; Czech Republic	115.77
C1 team	Slovakia; Emanuela Luknárová; Zuzana Paňková; Soňa Stanovská	131.13	France; Laurène Roisin; Marjorie Delassus; Lucie Baudu	132.57	Czech Republic; Gabriela Satková; Tereza Fišerová; Martina Satková	132.81

==== Kayak ====
Event	Gold		Silver		Bronze	
K1	Stefanie Horn; Italy; Eliška Mintálová; Slovakia	107.24	-		Mallory Franklin; Great Britain	110.29
K1 team	France; Camille Prigent; Romane Prigent; Emma Vuitton	115.30	Great Britain; Kimberley Woods; Mallory Franklin; Megan Hamer-Evans	118.64	Poland; Klaudia Zwolińska; Natalia Pacierpnik; Dominika Brzeska	121.23
Extreme Canoe Slalom	Tereza Fišerová; Czech Republic		Mallory Franklin; Great Britain		Ajda Novak; Slovenia	
