= Natalia Pacierpnik =

Polish canoeist (born 1988)

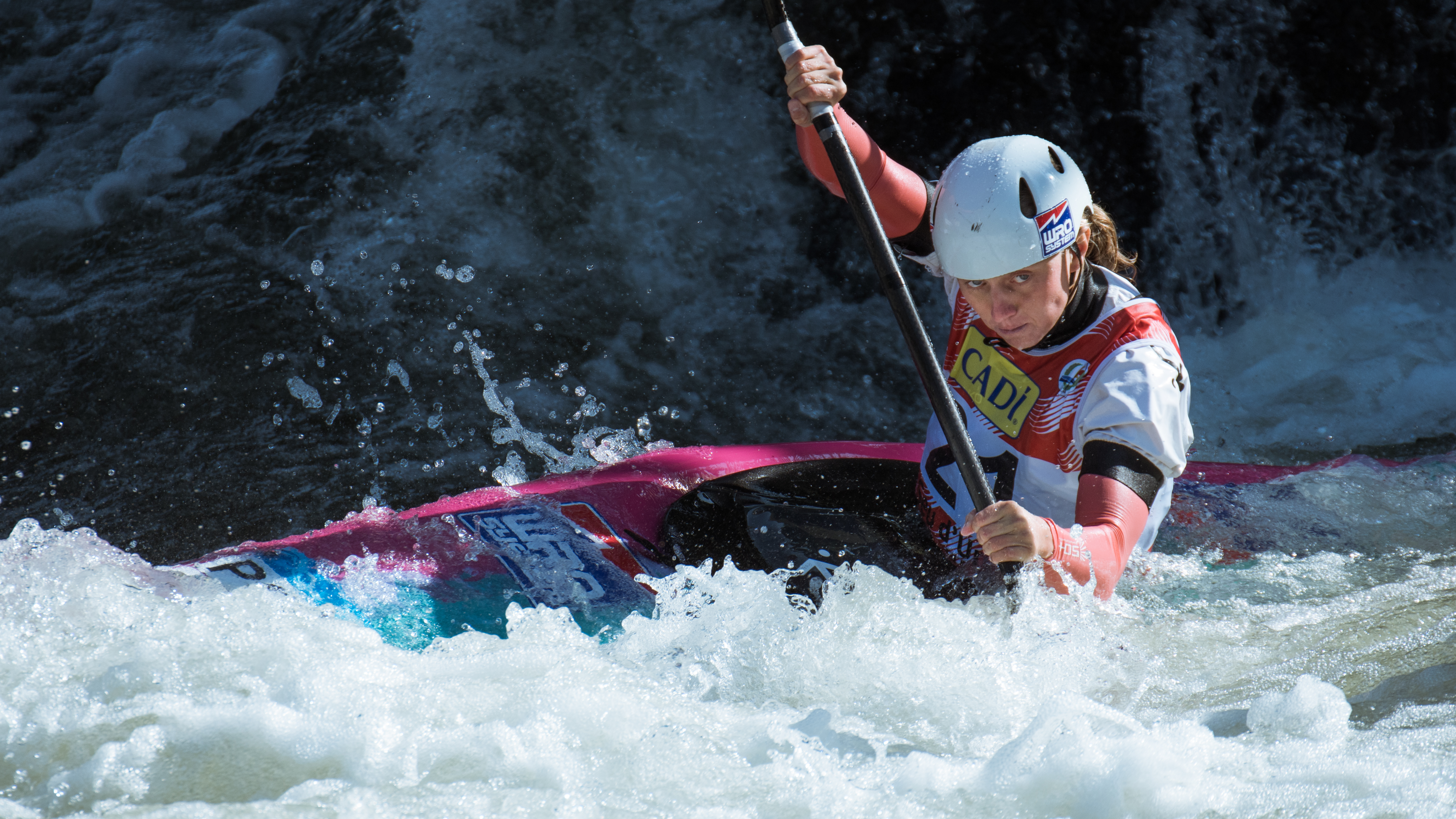
- Pacierpnik at the 2019 Canoe Slalom World Championships.

Personal information
- Born: 14 August 1988 (age 38) Końskie, Poland
- Height: 169 cm (5 ft 7 in)
- Weight: 58 kg (128 lb)
Medal record
Women's canoe slalom
Representing Poland
World Championships
Bronze medal – third place	2022 Augsburg	K1 team
European Championships
Silver medal – second place	2010 Bratislava	K1 team
Silver medal – second place	2015 Markkleeberg	K1 team
Bronze medal – third place	2022 Liptovský Mikuláš	K1 team
U23 European Championships
Bronze medal – third place	2008 Solkan	K1 team
Bronze medal – third place	2009 Liptovský Mikuláš	K1
Junior European Championships
Silver medal – second place	2005 Kraków	K1 team

Natalia Pacierpnik (born 14 August 1988 in Końskie) is a Polish slalom canoeist who has competed at the international level since 2004.

Pacierpnik won a bronze medal in the K1 team event at the 2022 ICF Canoe Slalom World Championships in Augsburg. She also won three medals (2 silvers and 1 bronze) in the K1 team event at the European Championships. At the 2012 Summer Olympics in London she competed in the K1 event, finishing 7th in the final. She finished in 11th place in the same event at the 2016 Summer Olympics in Rio de Janeiro.

== World Cup individual podiums ==
Season	Date	Venue	Position	Event
2021	12 June 2021	Prague	2nd	K1
2022	27 August 2022	Pau	2nd	K1
