= Klaudia Zwolińska =

Polish kayaker (born 1998)

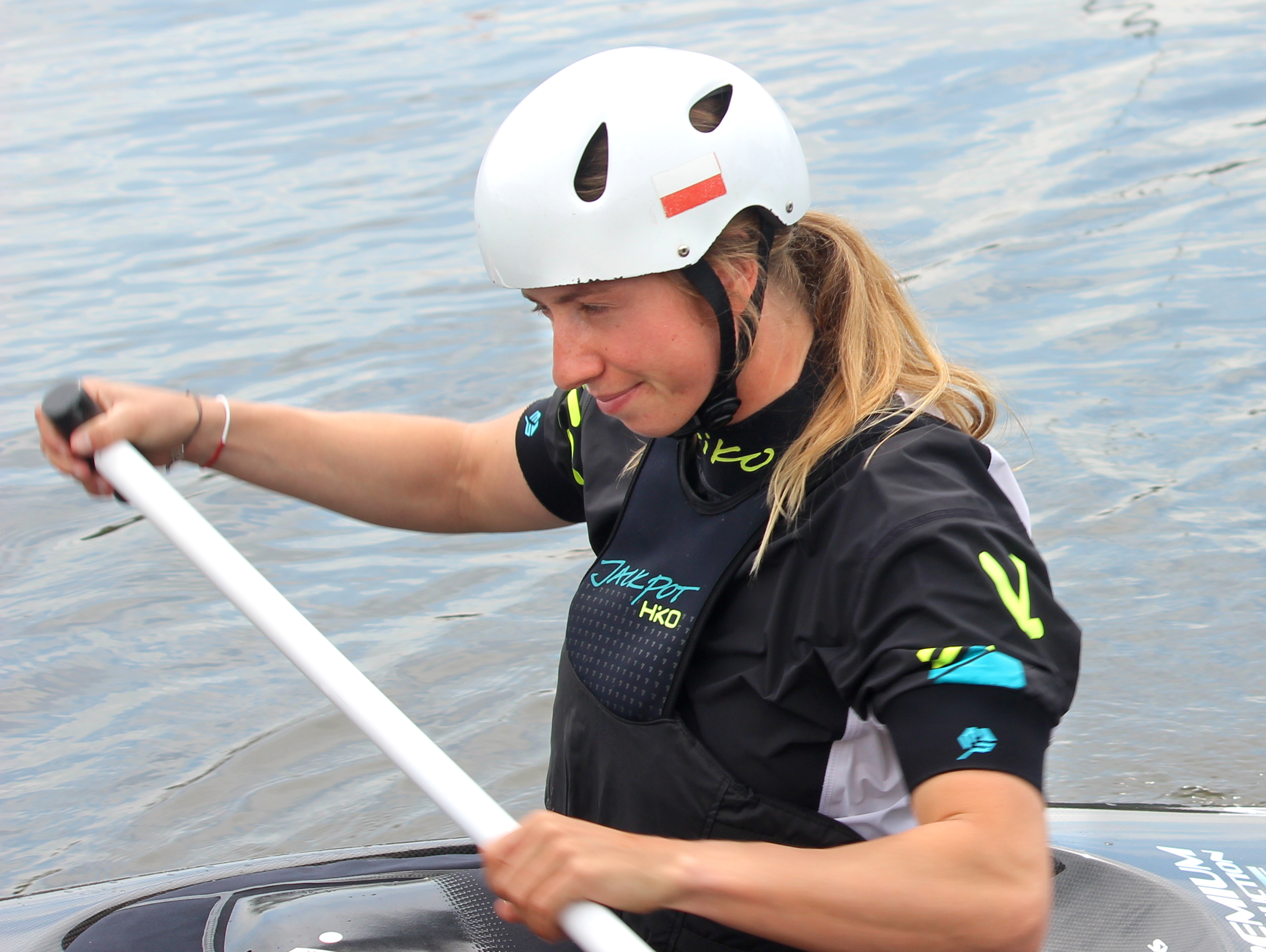
- Zwolińska in 2023

Personal information
- Nationality: Polish
- Born: 18 December 1998 (age 27) Nowy Sącz, Poland

Sport
- Country: Poland
- Sport: Canoe slalom
- Event: K1, C1, Kayak cross
- Club: KS Start Nowy Sącz
- Coached by: Piotr Kożuch
Medal record
Women's canoe slalom
Representing Poland
Olympic Games
Silver medal – second place	2024 Paris	K1
World Championships
Gold medal – first place	2025 Penrith	C1
Gold medal – first place	2025 Penrith	K1
Bronze medal – third place	2022 Augsburg	K1 team
Bronze medal – third place	2023 London	K1
Bronze medal – third place	2025 Penrith	Kayak cross
Bronze medal – third place	2026 Oklahoma City	C1
European Games
Silver medal – second place	2023 Kraków	C1
Silver medal – second place	2023 Kraków	K1
European Championships
Gold medal – first place	2024 Tacen	K1
Gold medal – first place	2026 Ivrea	K1
Silver medal – second place	2015 Markkleeberg	K1 team
Silver medal – second place	2024 Tacen	Kayak cross individual
Silver medal – second place	2026 Ivrea	Kayak cross individual
Bronze medal – third place	2022 Liptovský Mikuláš	K1 team
Bronze medal – third place	2026 Ivrea	Kayak cross
U23 World Championships
Silver medal – second place	2019 Kraków	K1
Bronze medal – third place	2017 Bratislava	K1
U23 European Championships
Gold medal – first place	2018 Bratislava	K1
Gold medal – first place	2021 Solkan	K1
Silver medal – second place	2019 Liptovský Mikuláš	K1
Silver medal – second place	2020 Kraków	K1
Bronze medal – third place	2017 Hohenlimburg	K1 team
Bronze medal – third place	2021 Solkan	C1 team
Junior World Championships
Gold medal – first place	2016 Kraków	K1
Bronze medal – third place	2016 Kraków	K1 team
Junior European Championships
Gold medal – first place	2015 Kraków	K1
Gold medal – first place	2016 Solkan	K1
Silver medal – second place	2014 Skopje	K1

Klaudia Kinga Zwolińska (born 18 December 1998) is a Polish slalom canoeist who has competed at the international level since 2013. She won the silver medal in the K1 event in Paris at the 2024 Summer Olympics.

== Career ==
Zwolińska is a two-time Olympian. In July 2021 she represented Poland at the delayed 2020 Summer Olympics in Tokyo. Zwolińska qualified 10th fastest for the final of the K1 event and finished in 5th place after incurring two 2-second penalties.

Zwolińska secured a silver medal in the K1 event at the 2024 Summer Olympics in Paris, her country's first medal of the Games, behind Australia's Jessica Fox. It was Poland's second Olympic canoe slalom medal, having previously got on the podium only in the men's C2 event at the 2000 Summer Olympics. She also finished 17th in the C1 event and 22nd in kayak cross.

Zwolińska won six medals at the ICF Canoe Slalom World Championships, with two golds (C1: 2025, K1: 2025) and four bronzes (C1: 2026, K1: 2023, kayak cross: 2025, K1 team: 2022).

She also won a total of 9 medals (2 golds, 5 silvers and 2 bronze) at the European Canoe Slalom Championships, including two silver medals at the 2023 European Games in Kraków (C1 and K1).

In June 2021, she became the first ever Polish woman to win a Canoe Slalom World Cup, winning the opening round of the 2021 season ahead of compatriot Natalia Pacierpnik in the K1 category in Prague. Until that event, a Polish woman had never even appeared on the podium at a World Cup event. In June 2022, Zwolińska won another World Cup medal, this time silver, in the extreme slalom event in Prague, behind Czech canoeist Tereza Fišerová. In October 2023, Zwolińska won a World Cup event bronze in the K1 event at the pre-Olympic test event at Vaires-sur-Marne in France.

Zwolińska competed at the 2014 Youth Olympic Games in the Head-to-Head Sprint and Obstacle Slalom events, where she finished 17th and 7th, respectively. Zwolińska also won the K1 event at the 2015 and 2016 Junior European Championships and the 2016 Junior World Championships.

=== World Cup individual podiums ===
Season	Date	Venue	Position	Event
2021	12 June 2021	Prague	1st	K1
2022	12 June 2022	Prague	2nd	Kayak cross
2023	6 October 2023	Vaires-sur-Marne	3rd	K1
2026	5 June 2026	Prague	2nd	K1
2026	7 June 2026	Prague	2nd	Kayak cross
2026	12 June 2026	Augsburg	3rd	K1
2026	3 September 2026	Vaires-sur-Marne	3rd	K1

== Awards and honors ==
- Polish Sports Personality of the Year (2025)
