= Ajda Novak =

Slovenian canoeist (born 1993)

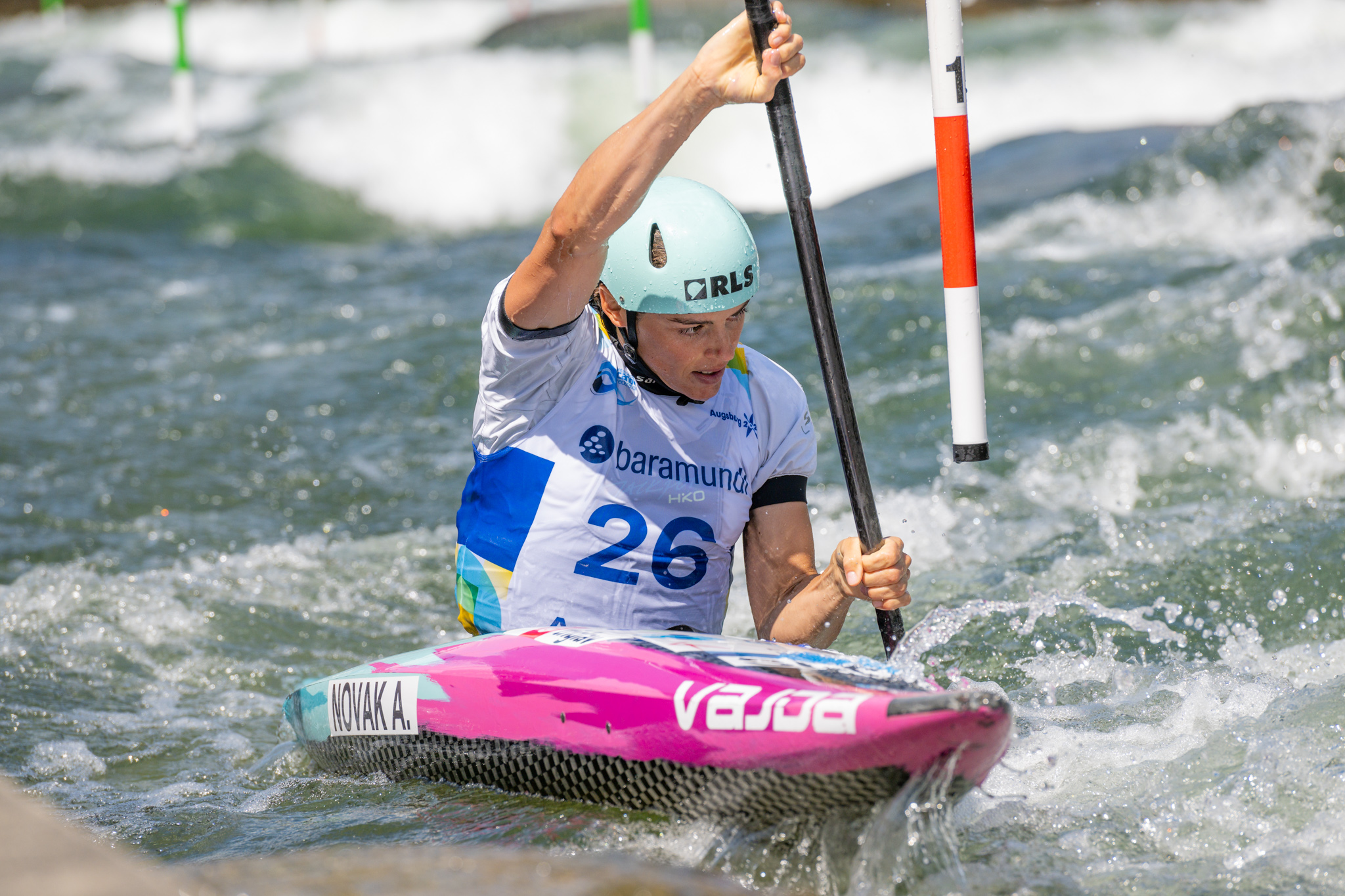
- Ajda Novak performing at 2022 ICF Canoe Slalom World Championships in Augsburg, Germany

Personal information
- Nationality: Slovenian
- Born: 16 September 1993 (age 32) Ljubljana, Slovenia

Sport
- Country: Slovenia
- Sport: Canoe slalom
- Club: KKK Ljubljana
Medal record
Women's canoe slalom
Representing Slovenia
World Championships
Silver medal – second place	2022 Augsburg	K1 team
Silver medal – second place	2025 Penrith	Kayak cross individual
Bronze medal – third place	2013 Prague	K1 team
Bronze medal – third place	2025 Penrith	K1 team
European Championships
Gold medal – first place	2017 Tacen	K1 team
Gold medal – first place	2024 Tacen	K1 team
Bronze medal – third place	2022 Liptovský Mikuláš	Kayak cross
U23 European Championships
Gold medal – first place	2014 Skopje	K1 team
Women's wildwater canoeing
U23 World Championships
Gold medal – first place	2015 Bryson City	K1
Junior World Championships
Gold medal – first place	2011 Opava	K1

Ajda Novak (born 16 September 1993) is a Slovenian slalom canoeist who has competed at the international level since 2010.

She won four medals at the ICF Canoe Slalom World Championships with two silvers (Kayak cross individual: 2025, K1 team: 2022) and two bronzes (K1 team: 2013, 2025). She also won three medals (2 gold and 1 bronze) at the European Championships.

== World Cup individual podiums ==
Season	Date	Venue	Position	Event
2019	30 June 2019	Tacen	3rd	Kayak cross
2022	28 August 2022	Pau	3rd	Kayak cross
2025	15 June 2025	Pau	2nd	Kayak cross individual

== International Achievements ==
Season	Date	Venue	Position	Event
2010	14 Aug 2010	Singapore	4th	K1W
2011	11 Jun 2011	Opava	1st	K1W Junior
2013	29 Sep 2013	Prague	3rd	K1W teams
2014	29 Jun 2014	Skopje	1st	K1W teams U23
2015	28 Jun 2015	Nantahala	1st	K1W U23
2017	27 Jun 2010	Tacen	1st	K1W teams
