= Antonie Galušková =

Czech slalom canoeist (born 2001)

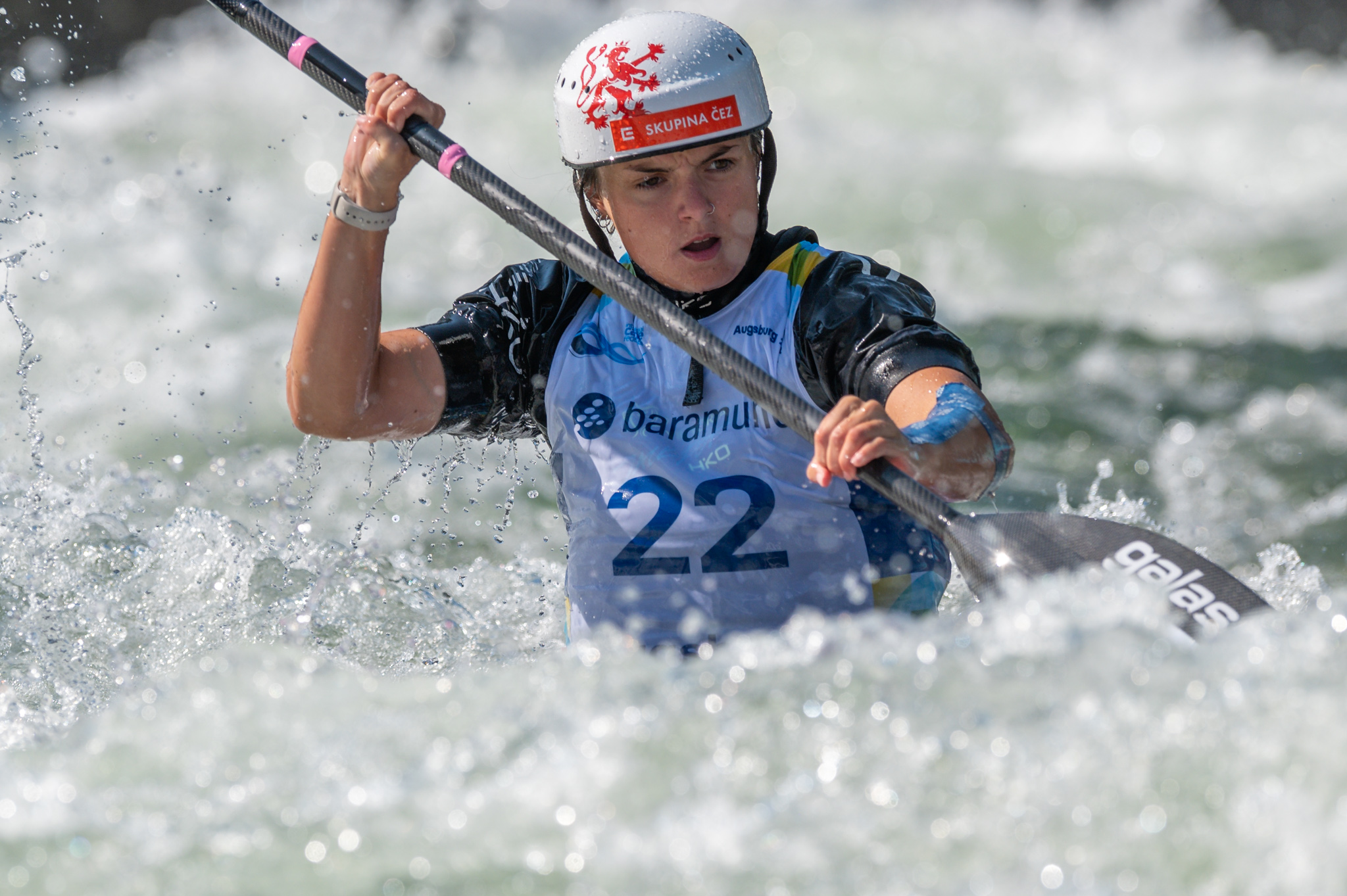

Personal information
- Nationality: Czech
- Born: 17 May 2001 (age 25) Strakonice, Czech Republic
- Height: 174 cm (5 ft 9 in)

Sport
- Country: Czech Republic
- Sport: Canoe slalom
- Event(s): K1, Kayak cross, C2 mixed
Medal record
Women's canoe slalom
Representing the Czech Republic
World Championships
Gold medal – first place	2025 Penrith	K1 team
Silver medal – second place	2021 Bratislava	K1 team
European Games
Silver medal – second place	2023 Kraków	K1 team
European Championships
Gold medal – first place	2020 Prague	K1 team
Gold medal – first place	2025 Vaires-sur-Marne	K1 team
Bronze medal – third place	2021 Ivrea	K1 team
Bronze medal – third place	2024 Tacen	K1 team
U23 World Championships
Gold medal – first place	2022 Ivrea	K1 team
Silver medal – second place	2019 Kraków	C2 Mixed
Silver medal – second place	2023 Kraków	K1
Silver medal – second place	2023 Kraków	K1 team
Bronze medal – third place	2021 Tacen	Kayak cross
U23 European Championships
Gold medal – first place	2022 České Budějovice	K1
Silver medal – second place	2023 Bratislava	K1
Bronze medal – third place	2020 Kraków	K1
Bronze medal – third place	2020 Kraków	K1 team
Junior World Championships
Gold medal – first place	2016 Kraków	K1 team
Gold medal – first place	2017 Bratislava	K1
Gold medal – first place	2018 Ivrea	K1 team
Gold medal – first place	2019 Kraków	K1
Silver medal – second place	2019 Kraków	K1 team
Bronze medal – third place	2016 Kraków	K1
Junior European Championships
Gold medal – first place	2016 Solkan	K1 team
Gold medal – first place	2017 Hohenlimburg	K1 team
Gold medal – first place	2018 Bratislava	K1 team
Gold medal – first place	2019 Liptovský Mikuláš	K1 team
Silver medal – second place	2017 Hohenlimburg	K1
Silver medal – second place	2019 Liptovský Mikuláš	K1
Bronze medal – third place	2018 Bratislava	K1

Antonie Galušková (born 17 May 2001) is a Czech slalom canoeist who has competed at the international level since 2016, specializing in K1 and kayak cross.

She won won two medals in the K1 team event at the World Championships with a gold in 2025 and a silver in 2021.

She also won two golds, a silver and two bronze medals in the same event at the European Championships, with the silver medal coming at the 2023 European Games in Kraków.

Galušková competed at the 2024 Summer Olympics, finishing 21st in the K1 event and 25th in kayak cross.

She is the 2022 U23 European Champion (K1) and the 2022 Czech Champion (K1)
