= Dominika Brzeska =

Polish slalom canoeist (born 2004)

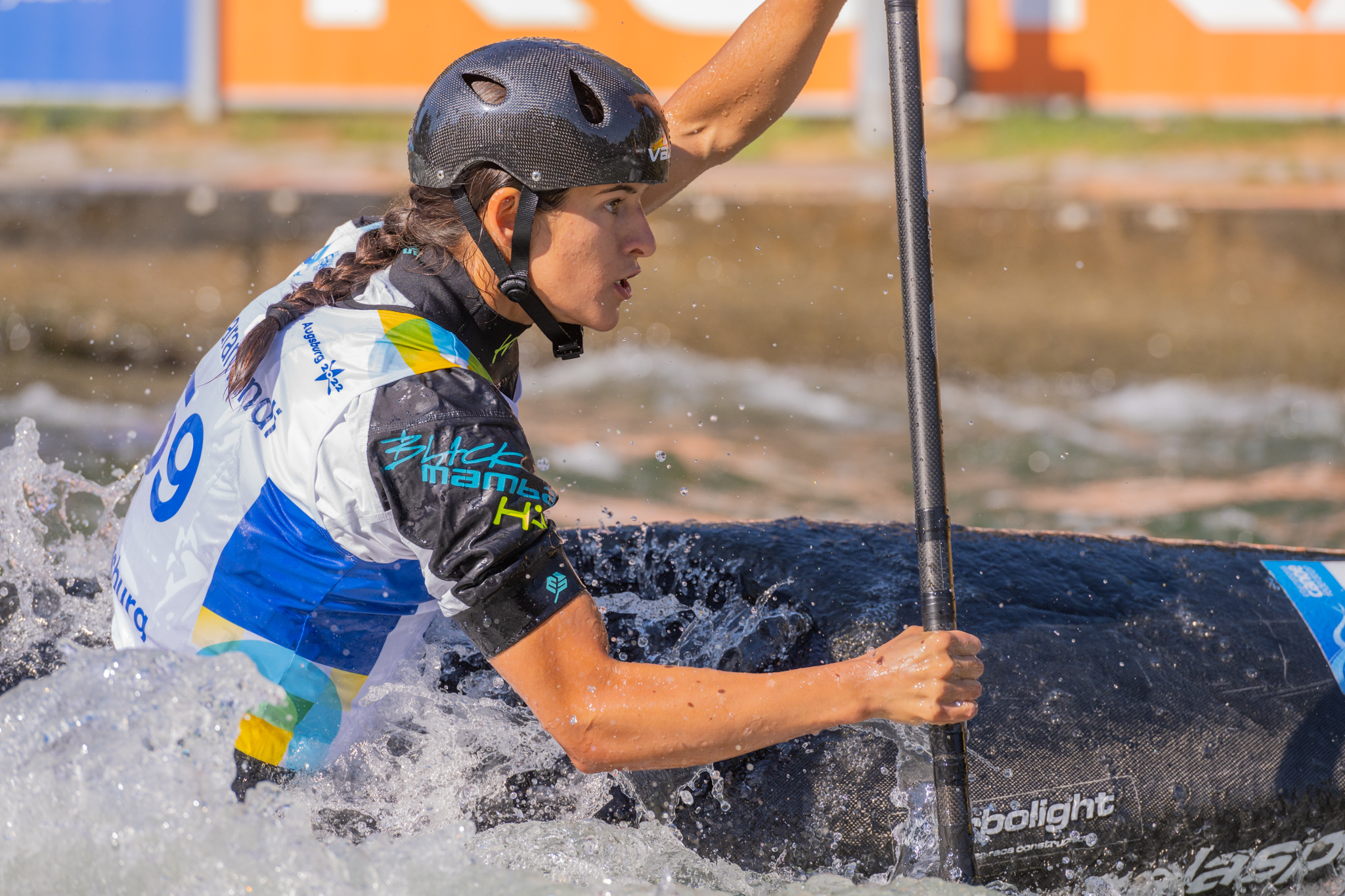
- Dominika Brzeska performing at 2022 ICF Canoe Slalom World Championships in Augsburg, Germany

Personal information
- Nationality: Polish
- Born: 2004 (age 21–22)

Sport
- Country: Poland
- Sport: Canoe slalom
- Event: K1
Medal record
Women's canoe slalom
Representing Poland
World Championships
Bronze medal – third place	2022 Augsburg	K1 team
European Championships
Bronze medal – third place	2022 Liptovský Mikuláš	K1 team
U23 World Championships
Bronze medal – third place	2026 Kraków	Kayak cross individual
U23 European Championships
Gold medal – first place	2026 Épinal	K1
Junior World Championships
Silver medal – second place	2022 Ivrea	K1

Dominika Brzeska (born 2004) is a Polish slalom canoeist who has competed at the international level since 2019.

She won a bronze medal in the K1 team event at the 2022 World Championships in Augsburg. She also won a bronze medal in the K1 team event at the 2022 European Championships in Liptovský Mikuláš.
