= 2019 Canoe Slalom World Cup =

2019 Canoe Slalom World Championship

The 2019 Canoe Slalom World Cup was a series of five races in several canoeing and kayaking categories organized by the International Canoe Federation (ICF). It was the 32nd edition.

== Calendar ==
The series opened with World Cup Race 1 in Lee Valley, England (13–16 June) and ended with the World Cup Final in Prague, Czech Republic (6–8 September).

Label	Venue	Date	Note
World Cup Race 1	(United Kingdom) Lee Valley	14–16 June	
World Cup Race 2	(Slovakia) Bratislava	21–23 June	
World Cup Race 3	(Slovenia) Tacen	28–30 June	
World Cup Race 4	(Germany) Markkleeberg	30 August – 1 September	
World Cup Final	(Czech Republic) Prague	6–8 September	Extreme kayak World Championships

== Standings ==
The winner of each race was awarded 60 points (double points were awarded for the World Cup Final). Points for lower places differed from one category to another. Every participant was guaranteed at least 2 points for participation and 5 points for qualifying for the semifinal run.

=== C1 men ===
Pos	Athlete	GBR (United Kingdom)	SVK (Slovakia)	SLO (Slovenia)	GER (Germany)	CZE (Czech Republic)	Points
1	Matej Beňuš (SVK)	5	2	17	5	1	289
2	Luka Božič (SLO)	4	3	9	2	3	287
3	Michal Martikán (SVK)	15	6	5	4	5	248
4	Benjamin Savšek (SLO)	10	9	4	6	7	238
5	Alexander Slafkovský (SVK)	29	5	3	1	10	229
6	Grzegorz Hedwig (POL)	16	8	10	26	4	204
7	Roberto Colazingari (ITA)	22		1	20	14	162
8	Kacper Sztuba (POL)	11	15		16	9	159
9	Franz Anton (GER)	8	1		3		148
10	Kirill Setkin (RUS)	12				2	141
11	Adam Burgess (GBR)	2				6	139
12	Denis Gargaud Chanut (FRA)	25	25		12	8	137
12	Tomáš Rak (CZE)	27	16	27	17	12	137
14	Martin Thomas (FRA)	7	17			11	130
15	Thomas Koechlin (SUI)	30	21	24	11	17	128
16	Casey Eichfeld (USA)	17	4	34	32	19	124
16	Stefano Cipressi (ITA)	40		6	10	20	124
18	Vojtěch Heger (CZE)	28	10		21	16	119
18	Anže Berčič (SLO)	32	23	2	22	27	119
20	Ryan Westley (GBR)	3				15	106

=== C1 women ===
Pos	Athlete	GBR (United Kingdom)	SVK (Slovakia)	SLO (Slovenia)	GER (Germany)	CZE (Czech Republic)	Points
1	Jessica Fox (AUS)	3	11	1	3	1	312
2	Ana Sátila (BRA)	26	3	5	8	7	225
3	Tereza Fišerová (CZE)	6	18		2	3	222
4	Lucie Baudu (FRA)	4	16		22	4	186
5	Nadine Weratschnig (AUT)		23	18	5	6	172
6	Evy Leibfarth (USA)		7	3	26	10	171
6	Eva Alina Hočevar (SLO)	23	10	7	10	21	171
8	Kimberley Woods (GBR)	2				2	165
9	Claire Jacquet (FRA)	7	1			18	150
10	Chen Shi (CHN)	11	25	31	29	5	144
10	Noemie Fox (AUS)	12	36	30	13	8	144
12	Viktoria Wolffhardt (AUT)	27	4	2	19	35	140
13	Andrea Herzog (GER)	5	5		4		134
14	Eva Říhová (CZE)	18	13		30	11	124
15	Monika Škáchová (SVK)	16	22		11	22	122
16	Rosalyn Lawrence (AUS)	22	38	10		12	119
16	Núria Vilarrubla (ESP)	13	14		1		119
18	Mallory Franklin (GBR)	1				15	116
19	Alsu Minazova (RUS)	8				9	110
20	Sophie Ogilvie (GBR)	10	9			23	108

=== K1 men ===
Pos	Athlete	GBR (United Kingdom)	SVK (Slovakia)	SLO (Slovenia)	GER (Germany)	CZE (Czech Republic)	Points
1	Jiří Prskavec (CZE)	2	4	3	3	1	319
2	Peter Kauzer (SLO)	8	6	2	7	4	266
3	Vít Přindiš (CZE)	38	7	4	1	2	262
4	Boris Neveu (FRA)	15	3		9	3	219
5	Giovanni De Gennaro (ITA)	13		1	8	7	214
6	Michał Pasiut (POL)	7	2	35	14	10	213
7	Dariusz Popiela (POL)	14	9	11	26	6	207
8	Vavřinec Hradilek (CZE)	18	19	31	5	9	188
9	Joe Clarke (GBR)	1		6		8	182
10	Antoine Launay (POR)	12	12	8	37	14	176

=== K1 women ===
Pos	Athlete	GBR (United Kingdom)	SVK (Slovakia)	SLO (Slovenia)	GER (Germany)	CZE (Czech Republic)	Points
1	Jessica Fox (AUS)	3	6	27	2	1	278
2	Eva Terčelj (SLO)	7	8	2	11	3	265
3	Corinna Kuhnle (AUT)	11	1	4	6	10	248
4	Ana Sátila (BRA)	14	22	10	4	2	240
5	Stefanie Horn (ITA)	10		1	3	17	238
6	Veronika Vojtová (CZE)	21	7	5	12	19	185
7	Viktoria Wolffhardt (AUT)	16	9	7	15	22	173
8	Kateřina Kudějová (CZE)	22	24	21	8	9	170
9	Eliška Mintálová (SVK)	6	30		16	4	166
10	Ricarda Funk (GER)	2	3		1		165

=== Extreme K1 men ===
Pos	Athlete	Points
1	Pedro Gonçalves (BRA)	221
2	Vavřinec Hradilek (CZE)	214
3	Stefan Hengst (GER)	165
4	Etienne Chappell (GBR)	163
5	Christian De Dionigi (ITA)	143
6	Ben Hayward (CAN)	130
7	Max Karlsson (SWE)	128
8	Martin Stanovský (KAZ)	125
9	Nikita Gubenko (RUS)	119
10	Fredrik Wahlén (SWE)	118

=== Extreme K1 women ===
Pos	Athlete	Points
1	Ashley Nee (USA)	295
2	Caroline Trompeter (GER)	215
3	Polina Mukhgaleeva (RUS)	165
4	Martina Wegman (NED)	130
5	Veronika Vojtová (CZE)	120
6	Sage Donnelly (USA)	114
7	Daria Kuznetsova (RUS)	95
8	Amálie Hilgertová (CZE)	83
9	Luuka Jones (NZL)	80
10	Alsu Minazova (RUS)	68

== Points ==
- World Cup points were awarded on the results of each race at each event as follows:

Position	1st	2nd	3rd	4th	5th	6th	7th	8th	9th	10th
C1 M	60	55	50	46	44	42	40	38	36	34
C1 W	60	55	50	46	44	42	40	38	36	34
K1 M	60	55	50	44	43	42	41	40	39	38
K1 W	60	55	50	46	44	42	40	38	36	34
Extreme K1	60	55	50	45	40	35	30	25	19	17

== Results ==
=== World Cup Race 1 ===
14–16 June in Lee Valley, England.

Event	Gold	Score	Silver	Score	Bronze	Score
C1 men	Sideris Tasiadis (GER)	94.63	Adam Burgess (GBR)	94.70	Ryan Westley (GBR)	95.07
C1 women	Mallory Franklin (GBR)	106.82	Kimberley Woods (GBR)	107.45	Jessica Fox (AUS)	113.62
K1 men	Joe Clarke (GBR)	90.35	Jiří Prskavec (CZE)	91.21	Hannes Aigner (GER)	92.04
K1 women	Mallory Franklin (GBR)	99.42	Ricarda Funk (GER)	101.86	Jessica Fox (AUS)	105.39
Extreme K1 men	Etienne Chappell (GBR)		Christian De Dionigi (ITA)		Sergey Maimistov (RUS)	
Extreme K1 women	Alsu Minazova (RUS)		Polina Mukhgaleeva (RUS)		Ashley Nee (USA)	

=== World Cup Race 2 ===
21–23 June in Bratislava, Slovakia.

Event	Gold	Score	Silver	Score	Bronze	Score
C1 men	Franz Anton (GER)	96.02	Matej Beňuš (SVK)	96.32	Luka Božič (SLO)	97.32
C1 women	Claire Jacquet (FRA)	112.15	Monica Doria Vilarrubla (AND)	112.32	Ana Sátila (BRA)	113.80
K1 men	Andrej Málek (SVK)	88.54	Michał Pasiut (POL)	88.66	Boris Neveu (FRA)	90.13
K1 women	Corinna Kuhnle (AUT)	99.71	Luuka Jones (NZL)	100.65	Ricarda Funk (GER)	102.05
Extreme K1 men	Vavřinec Hradilek (CZE)		Pedro Gonçalves (BRA)		Alexander Nepogodin (RUS)	
Extreme K1 women	Ashley Nee (USA)		Evy Leibfarth (USA)		Daria Kuznetsova (RUS)	

=== World Cup Race 3 ===
28-30 June in Tacen, Slovenia.

Event	Gold	Score	Silver	Score	Bronze	Score
C1 men	Roberto Colazingari (ITA)	87.48	Anže Berčič (SLO)	88.84	Alexander Slafkovský (SVK)	89.56
C1 women	Jessica Fox (AUS)	103.06	Viktoria Wolffhardt (AUT)	104.22	Evy Leibfarth (USA)	110.69
K1 men	Giovanni De Gennaro (ITA)	83.10	Peter Kauzer (SLO)	83.15	Jiří Prskavec (CZE)	84.97
K1 women	Stefanie Horn (ITA)	94.13	Eva Terčelj (SLO)	94.39	Viktoriia Us (UKR)	95.04
Extreme K1 men	Ben Hayward (CAN)		Pedro Gonçalves (BRA)		Christian De Dionigi (ITA)	
Extreme K1 women	Martina Wegman (NED)		Caroline Trompeter (GER)		Ajda Novak (SLO)	

=== World Cup Race 4 ===
30 August – 1 September in Markkleeberg, Germany.

Event	Gold	Score	Silver	Score	Bronze	Score
C1 men	Alexander Slafkovský (SVK)	92.54	Luka Božič (SLO)	94.33	Franz Anton (GER)	94.43
C1 women	Núria Vilarrubla (ESP)	104.98	Tereza Fišerová (CZE)	105.02	Jessica Fox (AUS)	105.14
K1 men	Vít Přindiš (CZE)	87.78	Lucien Delfour (AUS)	90.21	Jiří Prskavec (CZE)	90.32
K1 women	Ricarda Funk (GER)	95.27	Jessica Fox (AUS)	99.02	Stefanie Horn (ITA)	99.62
Extreme K1 men	Etienne Chappell (GBR)		Max Karlsson (SWE)		Tren Long (USA)	
Extreme K1 women	Caroline Trompeter (GER)		Ashley Nee (USA)		Sage Donnelly (USA)	

=== World Cup Final ===
6-8 September in Prague, Czech Republic. These were the World Championships for the extreme kayak events.

Event	Gold	Score	Silver	Score	Bronze	Score
C1 men	Matej Beňuš (SVK)	100.26	Kirill Setkin (RUS)	102.43	Luka Božič (SLO)	103.42
C1 women	Jessica Fox (AUS)	113.95	Kimberley Woods (GBR)	113.99	Tereza Fišerová (CZE)	118.39
K1 men	Jiří Prskavec (CZE)	90.67	Vít Přindiš (CZE)	93.20	Boris Neveu (FRA)	94.18
K1 women	Jessica Fox (AUS)	101.11	Ana Sátila (BRA)	103.98	Eva Terčelj (SLO)	104.30
Extreme K1 men	Stefan Hengst (GER)		Nikita Gubenko (RUS)		Pedro Gonçalves (BRA)	
Extreme K1 women	Veronika Vojtová (CZE)		Polina Mukhgaleeva (RUS)		Caroline Trompeter (GER)	
