= Calleva =

US outdoor education organization

Calleva Inc.
- Company type: Non-profit
- Founded: 1994; 32 years ago Darnestown, Maryland, U.S.
- Founders: Nick Markoff; Alex "Al" Markoff; Matt Markoff
- Headquarters: Poolesville, Maryland, U.S.
- Area served: Washington, D.C. Montgomery County, Maryland; Potomac, and Great Falls, Virginia
- Services: Summer camp, outdoor education, private programming
- Website: Calleva.org

Calleva is the largest outdoor education organization in Central Maryland, United States, established to provide outdoor team building opportunities, host summer camps, and take groups of individuals on excursions throughout Maryland, Virginia, North Carolina, West Virginia, Delaware, Colorado, and Canada, among other places. It is a 501(c)(3) educational non-profit.

== History ==
Calleva was started by Nick, Alex, and Matt Markoff, whose family was involved in the summer camp business for generations, including close ties to Valley Mill Camp. In the fall of 1993, in order to raise capital, they held the first ever Markoff's Haunted Forest. Camp Calleva began in the summer of 1994. The word Calleva means "where the paths cross".

They offer LIT (Leadership in Training), Cubs (ages 4–5), Explorer (ages 6–8), Adventure (ages 9–14), and High Adventure (ages 15–16) programs during the summer, as well as various other outdoor excursions throughout the year. The Calleva Ski Club was offered during the winter, but stopped in early 2020 due to COVID-19 and resort management changes.

In 1998 the first ever Calleva Challenge was held, a triathlon of sorts on the Potomac River. This was later renamed the Potomac Challenge in 1999.

== Locations ==
Calleva offers programming across five main locations including:

- Riley's Lock, in Poolesville, Maryland is the hub-location for Camp Calleva. It is adjacent to the Potomac River and the C&O Canal.
- Markoff's Farm, a 168-acre (0.68 km^{2}) farm, in Dickerson, Maryland is home to Markoff's Haunted Forest, CHAPs (Calleva Horse Adventure Programs), horseback riding, rock climbing, and Calleva's agricultural tourism programming, which includes Pizza Nights, located on the farm, and Dirty Dinners.
- Seneca Barn in Darnestown, Maryland
- Calleva Virginia, on the campus of The Madeira School
- Adventure Island, Calleva's private island on the Potomac River.
