= Lucie Baudu =

French slalom canoeist

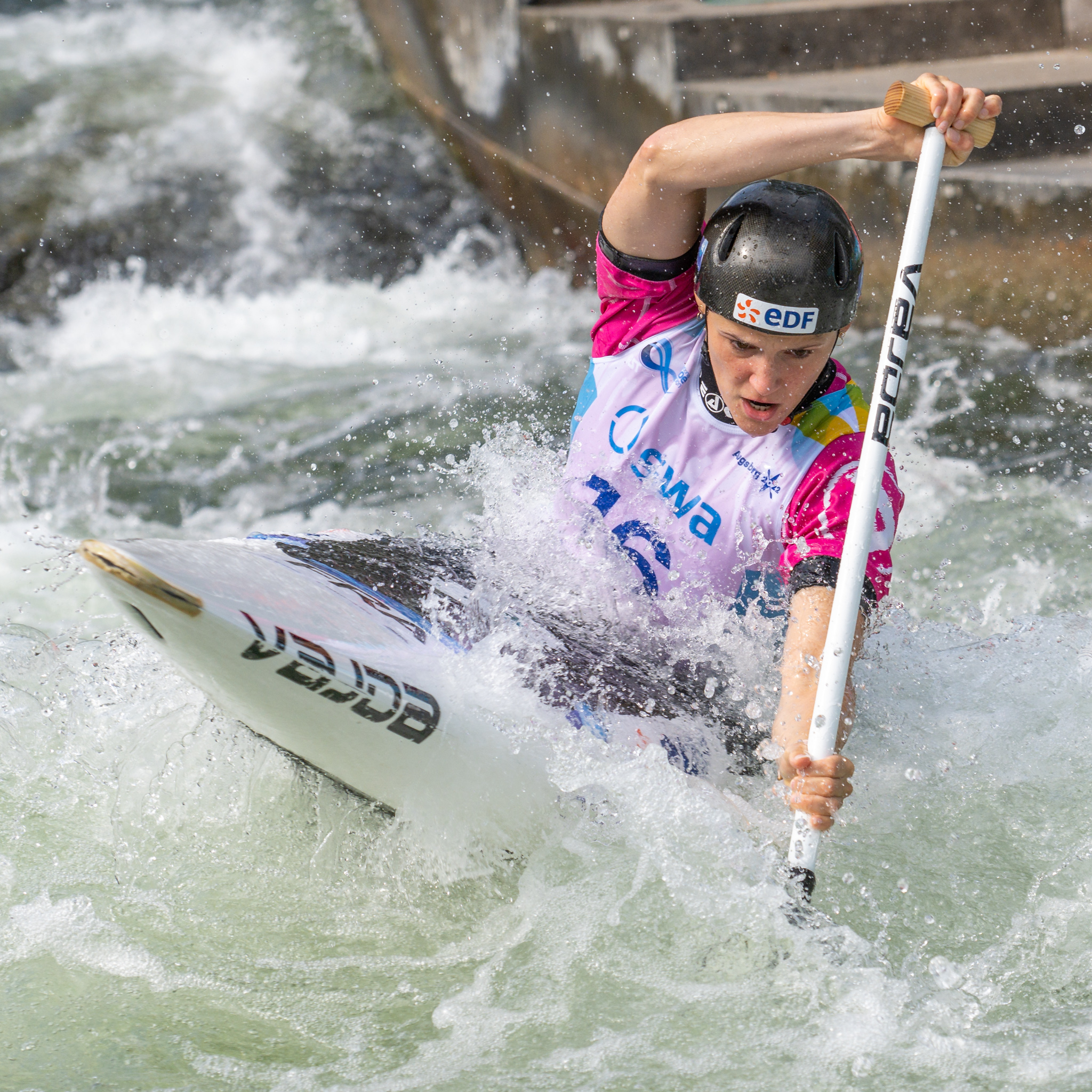
- Lucie Baudu performing at 2022 ICF Canoe Slalom World Championships in Augsburg, Germany

Personal information
- Nationality: French
- Born: 9 September 1993 (age 32) Pithiviers, France
- Height: 1.74 m (5 ft 9 in)
- Weight: 68 kg (150 lb)

Sport
- Country: France
- Sport: Canoe slalom
- Event: C1, K1
- Club: USM Saran Canoe Kayak
Medal record
Women's canoe slalom
Representing France
World Championships
Gold medal – first place	2018 Rio de Janeiro	K1 team
Bronze medal – third place	2018 Rio de Janeiro	C1 team
European Championships
Gold medal – first place	2019 Pau	K1 team
Silver medal – second place	2018 Prague	C1 team
Silver medal – second place	2020 Prague	K1 team
Silver medal – second place	2022 Liptovský Mikuláš	C1 team
Bronze medal – third place	2017 Tacen	K1 team
Bronze medal – third place	2020 Prague	C1 team
U23 World Championships
Bronze medal – third place	2012 Wausau	K1 team
Bronze medal – third place	2016 Kraków	K1 team
U23 European Championships
Bronze medal – third place	2014 Skopje	K1 team
Junior European Championships
Silver medal – second place	2011 Banja Luka	K1 team

Lucie Baudu (born 9 September 1993) is a French slalom canoeist who has competed at the international level since 2011.

She won two medals at the 2018 ICF Canoe Slalom World Championships in Rio de Janeiro with a gold in K1 team and a bronze in C1 team. She also won six medals at the European Championships with a gold (K1 team: 2019), three silvers (C1 team: 2018, 2022, K1 team: 2020) and two bronzes (C1 team: 2020, K1 team: 2017).

== Biography ==
She started kayaking at age 9 at the Saran Canoe-Kayak Club, where she is still a member. At just 15 years old, she left the Loiret to join the Pôle Espoir in Rennes.

She finished 3rd in the team canoe event at the 2014 ICF Canoe Slalom World Championships, but no medals were awarded due to low number of participating teams. At the 2017 European Championships, she won a bronze medal in the team kayak event. At the 2018 European Championships, she won a silver medal in the team single canoe event. At the 2018 World Championships, she won a gold medal in the kayak team event and a silver medal in the single canoe team event.

She won gold in the K1 slalom team event at the 2019 European Championships.

At the 2020 European Championships, she won a silver medal in the K1 team event with Camille Prigent and Marjorie Delassus and a bronze medal in the C1 team event with Lucie Prioux and Claire Jacquet.

She won a silver medal in the C1 team event alongside Marjorie Delassus and Laurène Roisin at the 2022 European Championships.

== World Cup individual podiums ==
Season	Date	Venue	Position	Event
2018	30 June 2018	Kraków	2nd	K1
