= Brian Fleury =

American football player and coach

Seattle Seahawks
- Title: Offensive coordinator

Career information
- Position: Quarterback
- High school: Seneca Valley (Germantown, Maryland)
- College: Maryland (1998); Towson (1999–2002)
- NFL draft: 2003: undrafted

Career history

Coaching
- Maryland (2003–2004) Intern & graduate assistant; Sacred Heart (2005–2008); Secondary coach (2005); Defensive coordinator, secondary coach & outside linebackers coach (2006–2008); Towson (2009–2012) Special teams coordinator & defensive backs coach; Buffalo Bills (2013) Quality control coach; Cleveland Browns (2014–2015); Assistant linebackers coach (2014); Outside linebackers coach (2015); San Francisco 49ers (2019–2025); Defensive quality control coach (2019); Offensive quality control coach (2020–2021); Tight ends coach (2022–2024); Run game coordinator & tight ends coach (2025); Seattle Seahawks (2026–present) Offensive coordinator

Operations
- Miami Dolphins (2016–2018); Football research analyst (2016); Director of football research (2017–2018)
- Coaching profile at Pro Football Reference

Brian Fleury is an American professional football coach who is the offensive coordinator for the Seattle Seahawks of the National Football League (NFL). He previously served as the tight ends coach for the San Francisco 49ers from 2022 to 2025.

Fleury played college football for Maryland and Towson as a quarterback and he has previously served as an assistant coach for Maryland, Sacred Heart, Towson, Buffalo Bills, Cleveland Browns, and Miami Dolphins.

== Early life ==
Fleury was born in Maryland. Fleury played quarterback for Frederick High School in Frederick, Maryland, before transferring to Seneca Valley High School in Germantown, Maryland. His stepfather was his head coach at the latter. Fleury only started as a senior and was selected All-Metro after throwing for 2,025 yards and 26 touchdowns while leading the team to an undefeated record and the state championship. He received no NCAA Division I athletic scholarship offers and thus joined the Maryland Terrapins as a walk-on in 1998. Fleury then played for the Towson Tigers from 1999 to 2002.

== Coaching career ==
=== Early career ===
Fleury began his coaching career in 2003 as a graduate assistant and intern at Maryland. After two years in the position, Fleury became secondary coach for the Sacred Heart Pioneers in 2005 and then served from 2006 to 2008 as their defensive coordinator, secondary coach and outside linebackers coach. He returned to Towson in 2009 and served four years as special teams coordinator and defensive backs coach.

=== Buffalo Bills ===
In 2013, Fleury was hired by the Buffalo Bills as an offensive quality control coach.

=== Cleveland Browns ===
In 2014, Fleury was hired by the Cleveland Browns as their assistant linebackers coach and then he was promoted to outside linebackers coach in 2015.

=== Miami Dolphins ===
In 2016, Fleury was hired by the Miami Dolphins, spending a year as a football analyst before being their director of football research from 2017 to 2018.

=== San Francisco 49ers ===
In 2019, Fleury was hired by the San Francisco 49ers as a defensive quality control coach under head coach Kyle Shanahan. In 2020, he shifted to being an offensive quality control coach. He helped the team reach the Super Bowl (Super Bowl LIV) in the 2019–2020 season against the Kansas City Chiefs.

In 2022, Fleury was promoted to tight ends coach, coaching All-Pro George Kittle. He was among the offensive coordinator candidates for the New England Patriots in 2024.

=== Seattle Seahawks ===
On February 19, 2026, Fleury was hired by the Seattle Seahawks as their offensive coordinator under head coach Mike Macdonald, replacing Klint Kubiak after his departure to become the head coach of the Las Vegas Raiders.
