= Joe Young (safety) =

American football player (born 1988)

No. 35
- Position: Safety

Personal information
- Born: June 2, 1988 (age 38); Rockville, Maryland, U.S.
- Listed height: 6 ft 0 in (1.83 m)
- Listed weight: 205 lb (93 kg)

Career information
- High school: Northwest (Germantown, Maryland)
- College: Rutgers
- NFL draft: 2011: undrafted

Career history
- Indianapolis Colts (2011–2013); Jacksonville Jaguars (2014)*
- * Offseason or practice squad member only

Career NFL statistics
- Total tackles: 66
- Pass deflections: 4
- Interceptions: 2
- Stats at Pro Football Reference

Joe Young (born Joe Lefeged, June 2, 1988) is an American former professional football player who was a safety in the National Football League (NFL). He played college football for the Rutgers Scarlet Knights. Young is better known by his former surname Lefeged.

== Early life ==
Young was born Joe Lefeged in Rockville, Maryland and raised in Gaithersburg, Maryland. He attended The Bullis School in Potomac, Maryland and then Northwest High School in Germantown, Maryland and was the Washington Post All-Met Defensive Player of the Year.

Lefeged played college football at Rutgers University.

== Professional career ==
=== Indianapolis Colts ===
Young was signed by the Indianapolis Colts as an undrafted free agent on July 29, 2011.

Young started four games in the 2012 season.

On June 29, 2013, Young was arrested in Washington, D.C., after fleeing police during a traffic stop, on five charges; carrying a firearm without a license, having an unregistered firearm, having unregistered ammunition, presence of a firearm in a motor vehicle and possession of an open container of alcohol.

=== Jacksonville Jaguars ===
On January 15, 2014, Young signed with the Jacksonville Jaguars. He was released on August 24.
