= Gottlieb Ayedze =

American football player (born 2000)

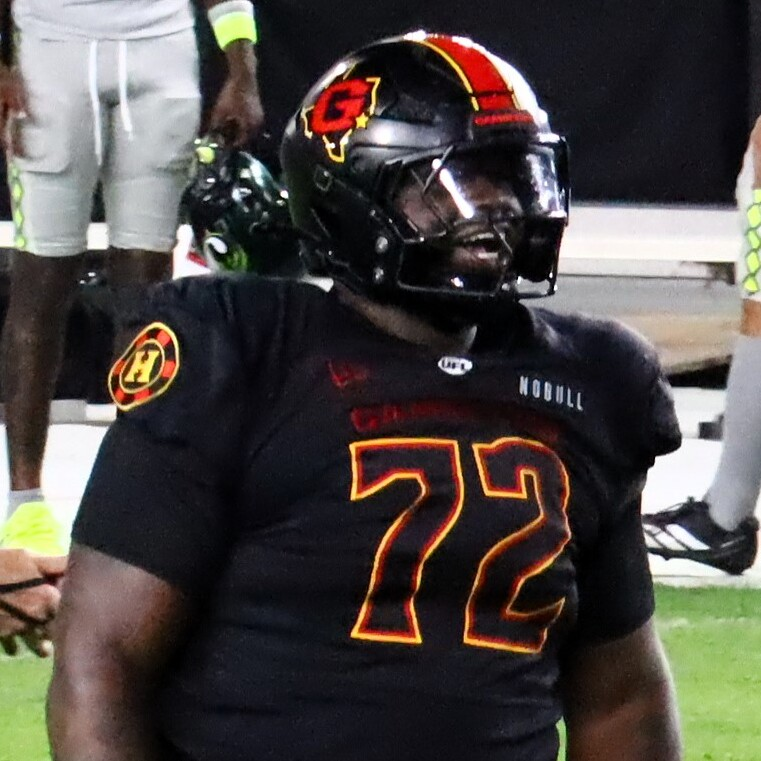
- Ayedze in 2026

Profile
- Position: Offensive tackle

Personal information
- Born: April 10, 2000 (age 26); Germantown, Maryland, U.S.
- Listed height: 6 ft 4 in (1.93 m)
- Listed weight: 305 lb (138 kg)

Career information
- High school: Northwest (Germantown)
- College: Frostburg State (2019–2022); Maryland (2023)
- NFL draft: 2024: undrafted

Career history
- Philadelphia Eagles (2024)*; Las Vegas Raiders (2024)*; DC Defenders (2026)*; Houston Gamblers (2026); Miami Dolphins (2026)*
- * Offseason or practice squad member only

Awards and highlights
- All-UFL Team (2026); 3× First-team All-MEC (2020–2022)
- Stats at Pro Football Reference

Gottlieb Ayedze (born April 10, 2000) is an American professional football offensive tackle. He played college football for the Frostburg State Bobcats and the Maryland Terrapins.

== Early life ==
Ayedze was born in the United States, but moved to Togo when he was age five, before returning to the U.S. when he was 15. He attended Northwest High School in Germantown, Maryland, where he lettered in football and track & field. He would commit to play college football at Frostburg State University.

== College football ==
=== Frostburg State ===
During Ayedze's true freshman season in 2019, he appeared in all 11 games, finishing the season with blocking for rushers to gain a total of 1,523 yards and 19 total touchdowns. During the 2020 season, he played in three games, finishing the season with blocking for rushers to gain 300+ yards against Alderson Broaddus. He was also named in the All-MEC First Team. During the 2021 season, he appeared in all 11 games, finishing the season with blocking for rushers to gain a total of 2,192 yards and 28 total touchdowns. He was also named in the All-MEC First Team. During the 2022 season, he appeared in and started all 11 games, finishing the season with blocking for rushers to gain a total of 2,104 yards and 15 total touchdowns. He was also named in the All-MEC First Team.

In December 2022, Ayedze announced that he would enter the transfer portal.

=== Maryland ===
On January 18, 2023, Ayedze announced that he would transfer to Maryland.

During the 2023 season, he played in 11 games at right tackle and started the final 10 games. He finished the season with blocking for rushers for the fourth-ranked overall offensive in the Big Ten with 387.3 yards per game, along with the top-ranked passing offense with 278.9 passing yards.

== Professional career ==
Pre-draft measurables
Height	Weight	Arm length	Hand span	Wingspan	40-yard dash	10-yard split	20-yard split	Three-cone drill	Vertical jump	Broad jump	Bench press
6 ft 4 1/8 in (1.93 m)	308 lb (140 kg)	33 in (0.84 m)	9 7/8 in (0.25 m)	6 ft 8 5/8 in (2.05 m)	5.01 s	1.72 s	2.88 s	7.71 s	26.5 in (0.67 m)	9 ft 4 in (2.84 m)	21 reps
All values from NFL Combine/Pro Day

=== Philadelphia Eagles ===
Ayedze was signed by the Philadelphia Eagles as an undrafted free agent on May 3, 2024. He was also selected by the DC Defenders with the fourth overall selection in the 2024 UFL draft on July 17. He was waived by the Eagles on July 25, then re-signed on August 17. He was waived on August 27 as part of final roster cuts.

=== Las Vegas Raiders ===
On September 25, 2024, Ayedze was signed to the Las Vegas Raiders practice squad. He signed a reserve/future contract with Las Vegas on January 6, 2025. On August 25, 2025, Ayedze was waived by the Raiders.

=== DC Defenders ===
On January 12, 2026, Ayedze was allocated to the DC Defenders of the United Football League (UFL).

=== Houston Gamblers ===
On March 13, 2026, Ayedze was traded to the Houston Gamblers in exchange for Braylon Sanders.

=== Miami Dolphins ===
On June 17, 2026, Ayedze signed with the Miami Dolphins. On August 30, Ayedze was waived by Miami as a part of final roster cuts; he was re-signed to the team's practice squad the following day. On October 30, Ayedze was released from the practice squad.
