= Ashley Nee =

American slalom canoeist

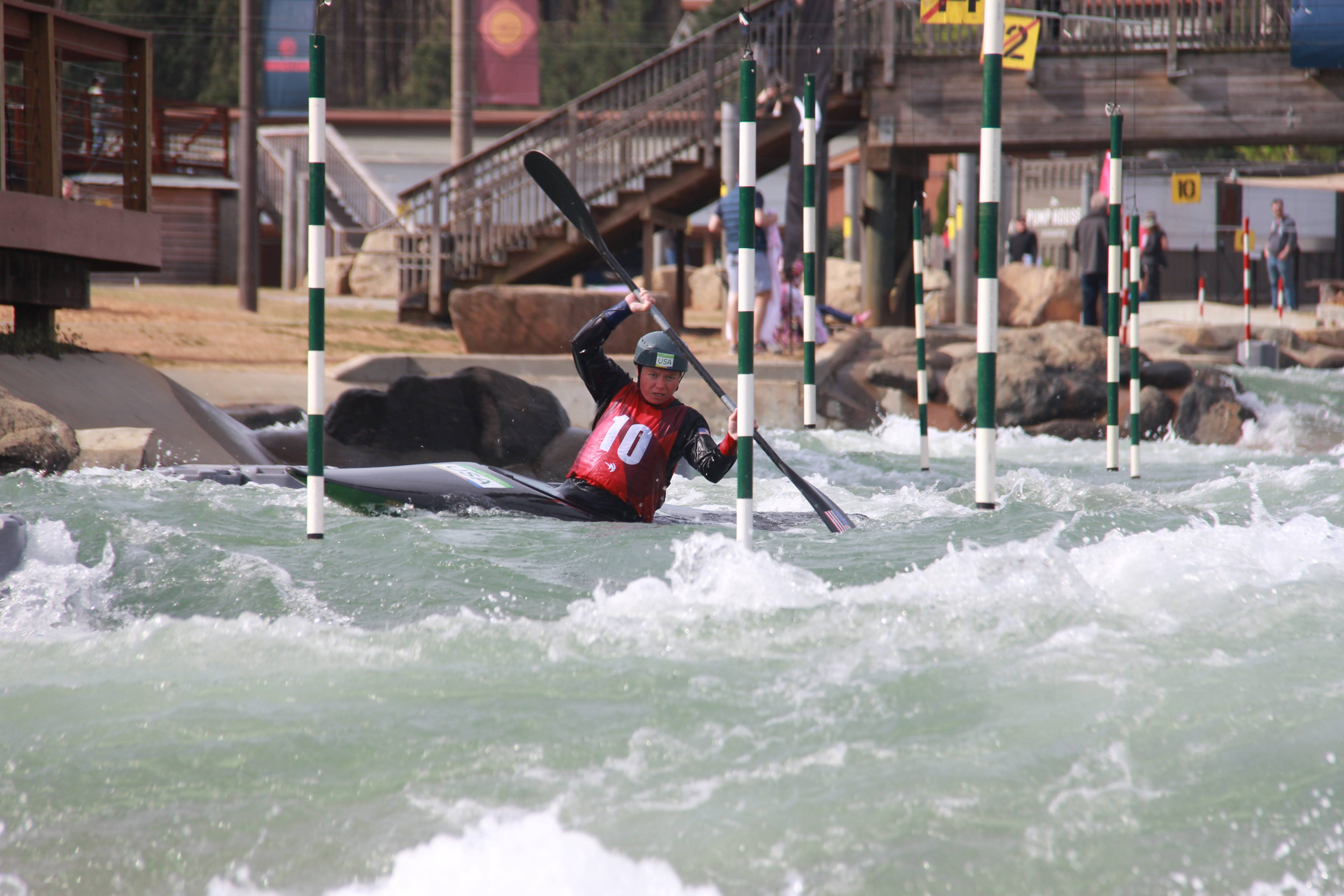
- Nee in 2018

Personal information
- Born: June 15, 1989 (age 37) Darnestown, Maryland, United States
- Height: 1.63 m (5 ft 4 in)
- Weight: 54 kg (119 lb)

Sport
- Country: United States
- Sport: Canoe slalom
- Event: K1, Extreme K1
Medal record
Women's canoe slalom
Representing United States
Pan American Games
Bronze medal – third place	2015 Toronto	K1

Ashley Nee (born June 15, 1989) is an American slalom kayaker who has competed at the international level since 2004.

== Early life and education ==
Nee is from Darnestown, Maryland. She began paddling after a chance encounter at Valley Mill Camp at the age of 10 and participated in racing when she was 12 years old. Nee attended Northwest High School. She attended University of Hawaii before transferring to University of Maryland, College Park to pursue a degree in kinesiology. Nee was an emergency medical technician in Montgomery County, Maryland.

== Career ==
Nee trains at the Dickerson Whitewater Course. In 2008, Nee qualified the berth for the 2008 Summer Olympics but was unable to win the spot due to a shoulder injury. She won the overall World Cup title in Extreme K1 in 2019. Nee won bronze at the 2015 Pan American Games. She finished in 14th place in the K1 event at the 2016 Summer Olympics in Rio de Janeiro.

== World Cup individual podiums ==
Season	Date	Venue	Position	Event
2019	15 June 2019	Lee Valley	3rd	Extreme K1
2019	23 June 2019	Bratislava	1st	Extreme K1
2019	1 September 2019	Markkleeberg	2nd	Extreme K1

== Personal life ==
Nee is openly gay. She is married to Ashley McEwan. They met in 2008 while Nee was working at a summer camp. She moved to Hawaii with her wife in 2008 to get a break from paddling and racing. They moved back to Maryland in 2012.
