= Kirill Setkin =

Russian slalom canoeist (b. 1993)

Personal information
- Nationality: Russian
- Born: 13 March 1993 (age 33)
- Height: 186 cm (6 ft 1 in)
- Weight: 80 kg (176 lb)

Sport
- Country: Russia
- Sport: Canoe slalom
- Event: C1
Medal record
Men's canoe slalom
Representing Russia
World Championships
Bronze medal – third place	2019 La Seu d'Urgell	C1 team
European Championships
Bronze medal – third place	2019 Pau	C1 team
U23 World Championships
Gold medal – first place	2014 Penrith	C1 team
Bronze medal – third place	2016 Kraków	C1
Junior World Championships
Gold medal – first place	2010 Foix	C1
U23 European Championships
Gold medal – first place	2015 Kraków	C1
Gold medal – first place	2015 Kraków	C1 team
Silver medal – second place	2016 Solkan	C1 team
Bronze medal – third place	2016 Solkan	C1
Bronze medal – third place	2014 Skopje	C1 team
Junior European Championships
Silver medal – second place	2010 Markkleeberg	C1
Silver medal – second place	2011 Banja Luka	C1
Bronze medal – third place	2009 Liptovský Mikuláš	C1 team
Bronze medal – third place	2011 Banja Luka	C1 team

Kirill Setkin (born 13 March 1993) is a Russian slalom canoeist who has competed at the international level since 2009.

He competes in the C1 category and he won a bronze medal in the C1 team event at the 2019 ICF Canoe Slalom World Championships in La Seu d'Urgell as well as a bronze medal in the same event at the 2019 European Canoe Slalom Championships in Pau. He is the U23 World Champion in the C1 team event from 2014 and the Junior World Champion in the C1 event from 2010.

In September 2012, Setkin was suspended from competition for six months, after he was found to have violated RUSADA anti-doping regulations.

== World Cup individual podiums ==
Season	Date	Venue	Position	Event
2019	7 September 2019	Prague	2nd	C1
