= Seneca Valley High School =

Public high school in Germantown, Maryland

Location
- 19401 Crystal Rock Drive; Germantown, Maryland 20874; United States; 39°10′30″N 77°15′52″W

Information
- Type: Public secondary
- Motto: Soaring Towards Excellence
- Established: 1974; 52 years ago
- School district: Montgomery County Public Schools
- CEEB code: 210582
- NCES School ID: 240048000918
- Principal: Ricardo Hernandez
- Teaching staff: 154.60 FTE (2022–23)
- Grades: 9–12
- Gender: Co-educational
- Enrollment: 2,239 (2022–23)
- Student to teacher ratio: 14.48 (2022–23)
- Campus: Suburban
- Campus size: 440,000-square-foot (41,000 m^{2})
- Colors: Green, gold
- Song: "Seneca Valley is the Best!"
- Mascot: Screaming Eagles
- Rival: Damascus High School; Northwest High School
- Newspaper: The Talon
- Website: www.montgomeryschoolsmd.org/schools/senecavalleyhs/

Seneca Valley High School (SVHS) is a public high school serving grades 9–12 in Germantown, Maryland, United States. It is part of the Montgomery County Public Schools (MCPS) system. The current building was finished in 2021, and has a capacity of 2,537 students.

As of 2024, Seneca Valley is the 83rd-ranked school in Maryland and the 4460th-ranked school nationally, according to U.S. News & World Report.

== History ==
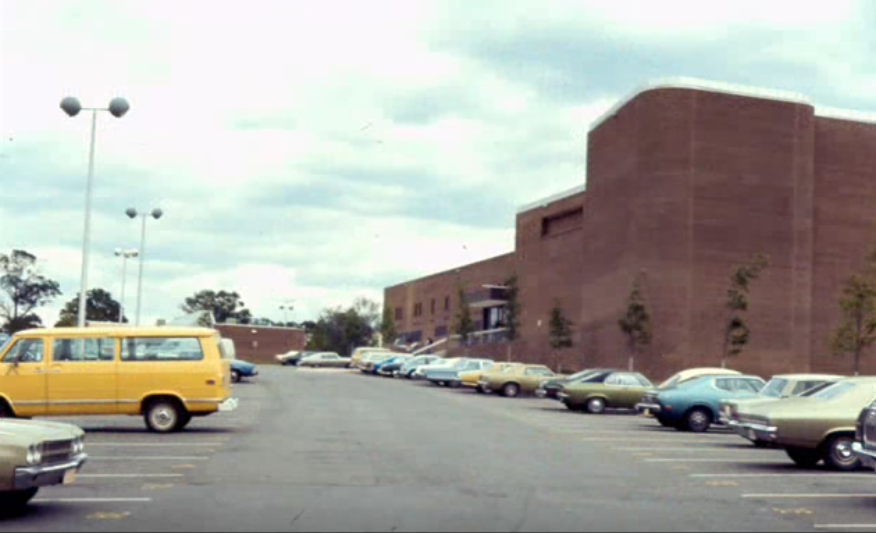
Seneca Valley High School's parking lot in 1974

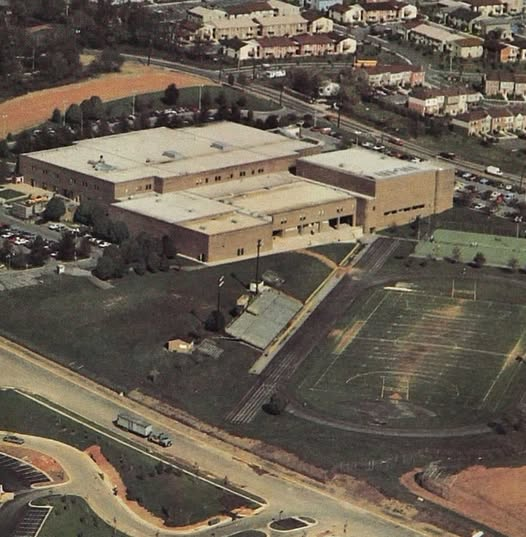
Seneca Valley High School as seen from the air in 1985

Seneca Valley High School sits on land that was once the site of a dairy farm owned by baseball player Walter Perry Johnson. Johnson purchased the land in 1935 and lived there with his family until his death in 1946.

Seneca Valley High School opened in 1974 as the first high school in Germantown and remained the only one until 1998, when Northwest High School opened. In its first year of operation, the 1974–75 school year, under Principal Nathan Pearson, Seneca Valley hosted students in grades seven through ten. In the following 1975–76 school year, the school operated grades nine through eleven, with 8th graders transferring to the newly opened Ridgeview Junior High School in Gaithersburg, Maryland. During the 1976–77 school year, Seneca Valley became a senior high school, hosting grades ten through twelve, and graduating its first class in June 1977.

In 1988, Seneca Valley changed to its present state of full-fledged high school with grades 9–12.

In 2017, construction work began for a completely new school building and campus. The original building was demolished in 2020 and replaced with a new building on-site which was completed in 2021. The new 440,000-square-foot building makes SVHS the physically largest high school in Maryland. The larger facility also changed enrollment boundaries to draw more students from the Clarksburg and Northwest High School areas, and accommodates 14 career and technical education programs (CTE) for the upcounty student population. The wellness center opening was delayed until 2022 as a result of the COVID-19 pandemic, and became the 4th to open at a Montgomery County public high school.

== Areas served ==
Seneca Valley primarily serves students living in Germantown and small populations in Clarksburg and Boyds. The school feeds from three middle schools and nine elementary schools.

- Roberto Clemente MS
  - Clopper Mill ES (island only)
  - Germantown ES (northern portion)
  - S. Christa McAuliffe ES
  - Dr. Sally K. Ride ES (southern tip)
- Dr. Martin Luther King Jr. MS
  - Lake Seneca ES
  - Spark M. Matsunaga ES (island only)
  - Dr. Sally K. Ride ES (except southern tip)
  - Waters Landing ES
- Neelsville MS
  - Cabin Branch ES
  - William B. Gibbs Jr. ES (except Clarksburg walkers)

Elementary School Split Articulations:

- Clopper Mill ES: everything except the island articulates to Northwest HS
- Germantown ES: southern portion articulates to Northwest HS
- Ride ES: south of Middlebrook Road articultes to Clemente MS, everyone else to King MS
- Matsunaga ES: everything except the island articulates to Kingsview MS and Northwest HS
- Gibbs ES: those in the Clarksburg walk zone articulate to Rocky Hill MS and Clarksburg HS

=== Recent boundary changes ===
In November 2019, the board of education approved boundaries that affected the following schools within the Seneca Valley cluster:

- Southern portion of Clarksburg ES (now Cabin Branch ES) reassigned from Rocky Hill MS and Clarksburg HS to Neelsville MS and Seneca Valley HS
- Clopper Mill ES island reassigned from Northwest HS to Seneca Valley HS
- Northern portion of Germantown ES reassigned from Northwest HS to Seneca Valley HS
- Gibbs ES (except Clarksburg walkers) reassigned from Rocky Hill MS and Clarksburg HS to Neelsville MS and Seneca Valley HS
- Matsunaga ES island reassigned from Kingsview MS and Northwest HS to King MS and Seneca Valley HS

In 2022, MCPS approved boundaries in anticipatation of the opening of Cabin Branch Elementary School, which was built to alleviate overcrowding at Clarksburg Elementary School. The Cabin Branch development was reassigned from Clarksburg ES to Cabin Branch ES, while students in the southern part of rural Boyds were reassigned from Clarksburg ES to Gibbs ES. All affected students would still attend Neelsville MS and Seneca Valley HS.

== Athletics ==
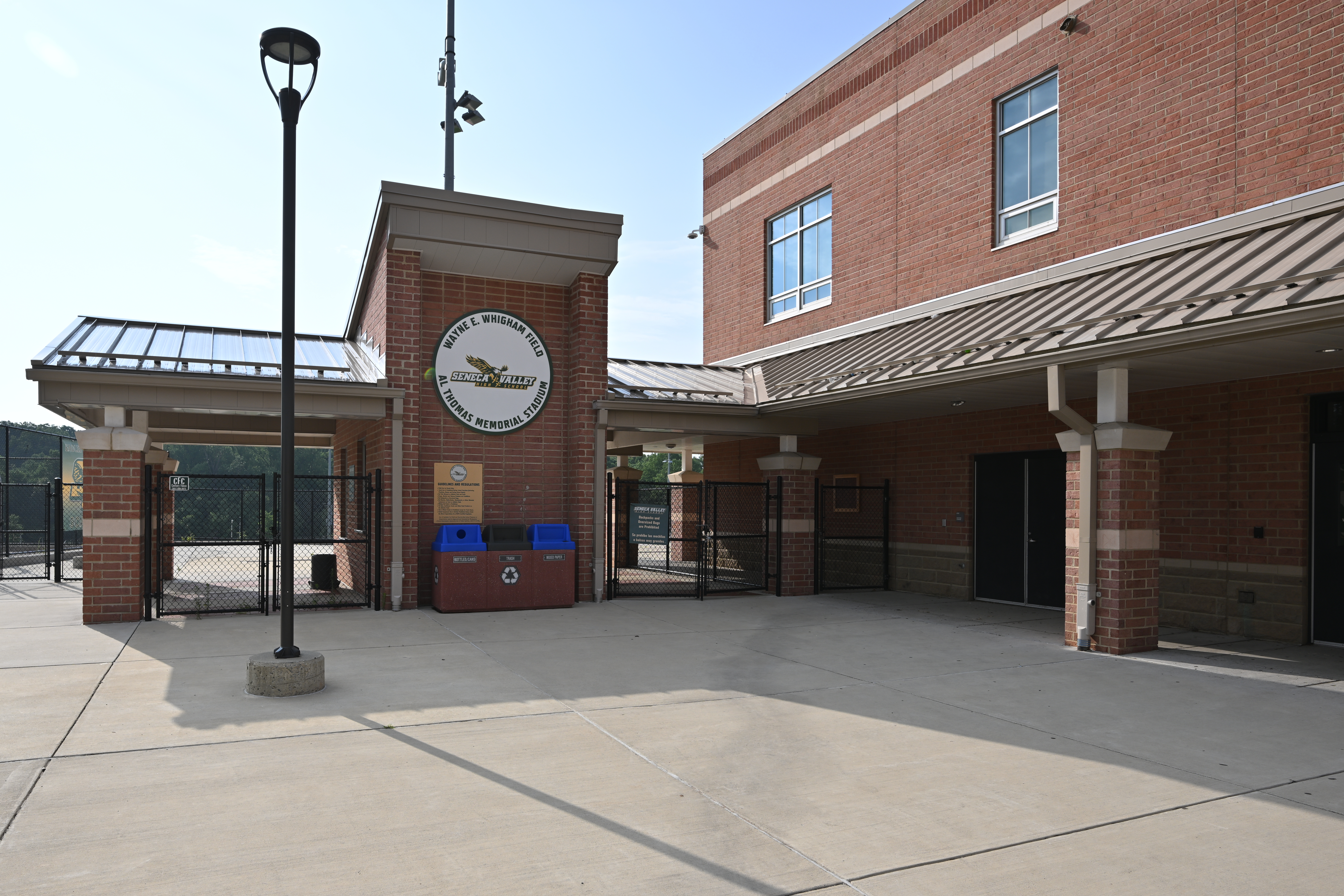
Seneca Valley High School stadium entrance, Germantown, MD

The school's colors are green and gold, and their mascot is the Screamin' Eagle. Seneca Valley's biggest athletic rivalry is with the nearby Northwest High School.

Seneca Valley's football team has won 12 state football championships, in 1976, 1977, 1979, 1980, 1987, 1992, 1993, 1994, 1997, 1998, 1999, and 2002. This is a Maryland state record which they share with Damascus High School.

Their hockey team (Upper Montgomery County Lightning) were JV state champions in 2022 and varsity county champions in 2024.

== Notable alumni ==
- Mark Bryan (1985), lead guitarist for Hootie and the Blowfish
- Sayon Cooper (1993), Olympic sprinter who represented Liberia at the 1996 and 2000 Summer Olympics.
- Neil Fallon (1989), vocalist for Clutch
- Dean Felber (1985), bass guitarist for Hootie and the Blowfish
- Brian Fleury (1998), Offensive Coordinator for the Seattle Seahawks
- Jean-Paul Gaster (1989), drummer for Clutch
- Dan Maines (1989), bass guitarist for Clutch
- Andre Smith (2006), NFL player
- Paula White (1984), televangelist and pastor, Paula White Ministries
