= Polina Mukhgaleeva =

Russian slalom canoeist

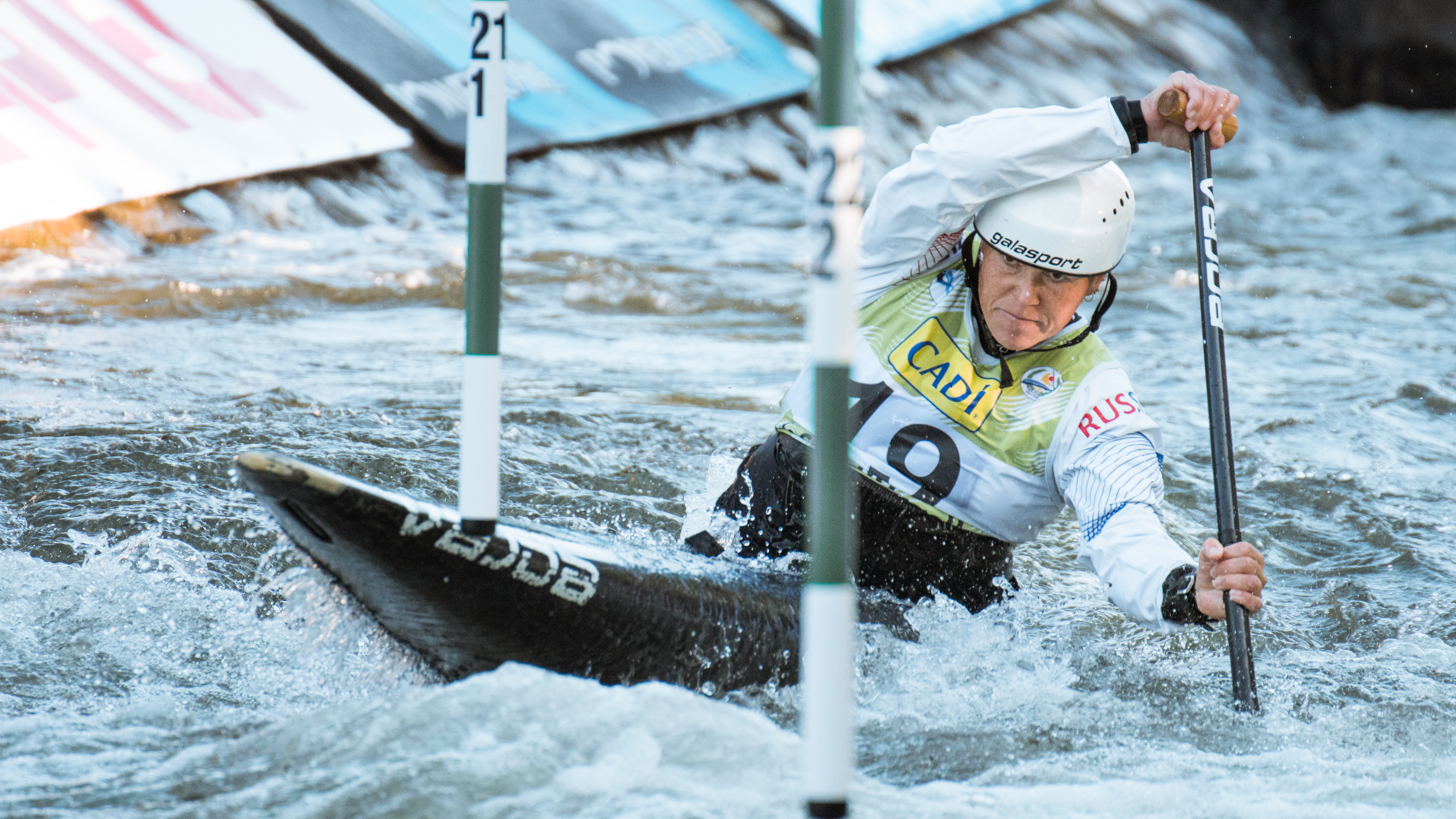

Personal information
- Nationality: Russian
- Born: 14 October 1991 (age 34)

Sport
- Country: Russia
- Sport: Canoe slalom
- Event: C1, K1, Extreme K1
Medal record
Women's canoe slalom
Representing RCF
World Championships
| Bronze medal – third place | 2021 Bratislava | C1 team |
Representing Russia
World Championships
| Silver medal – second place | 2019 Prague | Extreme K1 |
| Bronze medal – third place | 2018 Rio de Janeiro | Extreme K1 |
U23 World Championships
| Bronze medal – third place | 2013 Liptovský Mikuláš | K1 team |
U23 European Championships
| Bronze medal – third place | 2013 Bourg-Saint-Maurice | C1 team |
| Bronze medal – third place | 2014 Skopje | C1 team |

Polina Mukhgaleeva (born 14 October 1991) is a Russian slalom canoeist who has competed at the international level since 2008.

She won three medals at the ICF Canoe Slalom World Championships with a silver (Extreme K1: 2019) and two bronzes (Extreme K1: 2018, C1 team: 2021).

== World Cup individual podiums ==
| Season | Date | Venue | Position | Event |
|---|---|---|---|---|
| 2018 | 1 July 2018 | Kraków | 1st | Extreme K1 |
| 2018 | 8 July 2018 | Augsburg | 3rd | Extreme K1 |
| 2018 | 30 September 2018 | Rio de Janeiro | 3rd | Extreme K1^{1} |
| 2019 | 15 June 2019 | Lee Valley | 2nd | Extreme K1 |
| 2019 | 8 September 2019 | Prague | 2nd | Extreme K1^{1} |

^{1} World Championship counting for World Cup points
