= Andre Smith (tight end) =

American football player (born 1988)

No. 87
- Position: Tight end

Personal information
- Born: September 26, 1988 (age 38); Savannah, Georgia, U.S.
- Listed height: 6 ft 5 in (1.96 m)
- Listed weight: 270 lb (122 kg)

Career information
- High school: Germantown (MD) Seneca Valley
- College: Virginia Tech
- NFL draft: 2011: undrafted

Career history
- Chicago Bears (2011); Indianapolis Colts (2012)*; Dallas Cowboys (2012–2013); Cleveland Browns (2013)
- * Offseason or practice squad member only

Career NFL statistics
- Games played: 5
- Stats at Pro Football Reference

Andre Phillip Smith (born September 26, 1988) is an American former professional football player who was a tight end in the National Football League (NFL) for the Chicago Bears, Dallas Cowboys and Cleveland Browns. He played college football for the Virginia Tech Hokies.

== Early life ==
Smith attended Seneca Valley High School. He did not play organized football until his freshman season. He was a two-way player at tight end, defensive end and linebacker.

As a senior, he registered 18 receptions for 278 yards, 6 touchdowns, 44 tackles and 5 sacks. He received All-league and second-team All-state honors.

== College career ==
Smith accepted a football scholarship from Virginia Tech. As a sophomore, he had 10 receptions (sixth on the team) for 129 yards and one touchdown.

As a senior, he was known as a blocking tight end, but was still able to start 12 out of 14 games, while posting 20 receptions (fourth on the team) for 195 yards and 5 touchdowns. He finished his college career with 25 starts out of 54 games, 39 receptions for 438 yards and 7 touchdowns.

== Professional career ==
=== Chicago Bears ===
Smith was signed as an undrafted free agent by the Chicago Bears after the 2011 NFL draft on July 26. On September 3, he was waived and signed to the practice squad the next day. On November 9, he was promoted to the active roster. He was declared inactive for the final 8 games. He was released on May 14, 2012.

=== Indianapolis Colts ===
On May 15, 2012, he was claimed off waivers by the Indianapolis Colts. He was released on August 31.

=== Dallas Cowboys ===
On December 11, 2012, he was signed by the Dallas Cowboys to their practice squad.

In 2013, he played well enough in the preseason to force the team to make the unusual of move of keeping four tight ends. He appeared in 2 games and was declared inactive for 8 contests. His only statistic was the recovery of a squib kick that he returned for 10 yards. He was released on November 25.

=== Cleveland Browns ===
On November 26, 2013, he was claimed off waivers by the Cleveland Browns. He was released on May 19, 2014.

== Personal life ==
Smith lost his mother during his senior year in high school. In 2017, he graduated from the police academy and started working for the Montgomery County Police Department.
