= Northwest High School (Maryland) =

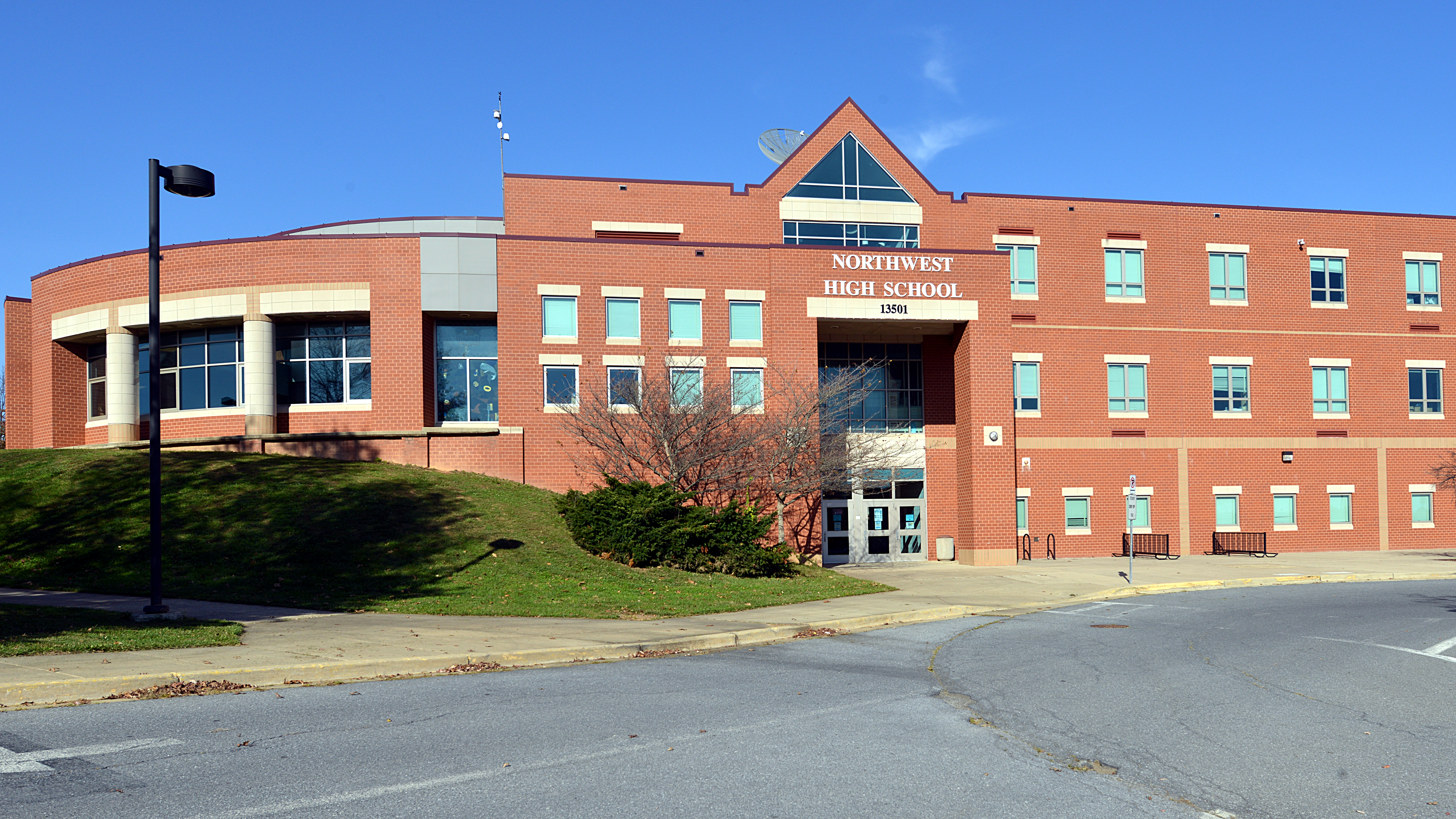

Location
- 13501 Richter Farm Road; Germantown, Maryland 20874; United States; 39°09′06″N 77°16′48″W

Information
- Type: Public secondary
- Established: 1998; 28 years ago
- School district: Montgomery County Public Schools
- Principal: Nyurka Morales (acting)
- Grades: 9–12
- Enrollment: 2,484 (2022-23)
- Campus: Suburban
- Colors: Black, silver, and white
- Nickname: Jaguars
- Rivals: Seneca Valley, Quince Orchard
- Newspaper: The Jagwire
- Website: www.montgomeryschoolsmd.org/schools/northwesths/

Northwest High School (NWHS) is a public high school in Germantown, Maryland. It is part of the Montgomery County Public Schools public school system. As of 2022, it enrolled 2,484 students. It is one of two high schools in Germantown, the other being Seneca Valley High School, with which Northwest shares an athletic rivalry. The school also serves small sections of the cities of Gaithersburg and Darnestown.

The school was established in 1998, and completed an expansion project during the summer of 2006.

Northwest's school mascot is the jaguar and its colors are black, silver and white.

== Academics ==
Northwest High School offers a number of and Advanced Placement courses, along with courses in American Sign Language (ASL), French and Spanish. The school has an average SAT score of 1129, above the national mean of 1050 yet below the county's average score of 1227.

Northwest hosts the Ulysses Signature Program, a four-year research-based program in which students develop projects focused on one of four themes: arts and humanities; public policy and public service; and/or math, science and technology. Students are recommended for the rigorous research program as freshmen and remain in the program throughout their senior year.

As of 2024, Northwest is the 20th-ranked highschool in Maryland and the 1059th-ranked school nationwide according to U.S News and World Report.

== Principals ==
- Edward Shirley (1998–2002)
- Sylvia Morrison (2002–2009)
- Eileen "E. Lance" Lancellotti Dempsey (2009–2016)
- James "Jimmy" D'Andrea (2016–2021)
- Scott "Scottie" Smith (2021–Present)

== Areas served ==
Students attending Northwest come from parts of Germantown, Boyds, Gaithersburg, and Darnestown, as well as very small portions of Poolesville and Potomac.

Northwest is fed by three area middle schools and eight area elementary schools in the following feeder patterns:

- Kingsview MS (grades 6–8): Great Seneca Creek (K-5), Ronald McNair ES (pre-K-5), Spark M. Matsunaga ES (K-5)
- Lakelands Park MS (grades 6–8) (split articulation with Quince Orchard Cluster): Darnestown ES (K-5), Diamond ES (K-5)
- Roberto Clemente MS (grades 6–8) (split articulation with Seneca Valley Cluster): Clopper Mill ES (pre-K-5), Germantown ES (K-5)

Elementary School Split Articulations:

- Spark M. Matsunaga ES: island articulates to King MS and Seneca Valley HS
- Diamond ES: a small portion articulates to Ridgeview MS and Quince Orchard HS
- Clopper Mill ES: island articulates to Seneca Valley HS
- Germantown ES: northern portion articulates to Seneca Valley HS

=== Recent Changes to Areas Served ===
In November 2019, the board of education approved boundaries that affected the following schools within the Northwest cluster:

- Spark M. Matsunaga ES island reassigned from Kingsview MS and Northwest HS to King MS and Seneca Valley HS
- Clopper Mill ES island reassigned from Northwest HS to Seneca Valley HS
- Northern portion of Germantown ES service area reassigned from Northwest HS to Seneca Valley HS
- Portion of Greek Seneca Creek ES reassigned from Clemente MS to Kingsview MS

=== Expected Future Changes ===
As of the 2023-24 school year, Northwest projects to be over-enrolled for the next 15 years with its current attendance zones. To address these concerns, along with overutilization among other nearby schools, the county is conducting a boundary study for the new Crown HS, which has an expected completion date of August 2027.

== Athletics ==
All teams have varsity and junior varsity teams with the exception of tennis, golf, swim and dive, indoor track and field, poms, and boys'/coed volleyball. JV lacrosse teams were added to Montgomery County athletics in 2008.

=== Fall sports ===
- Football
- Soccer
- Cross country
- Girls' tennis
- Golf
- Field hockey
- Girls' volleyball
- Cheerleading
- Pickle Ball

=== Winter sports ===
- Basketball
- Wrestling
- Indoor Track and Field
- Hockey
- Swim and dive
- Cheerleading

=== Spring sports ===
- Baseball
- Softball
- Outdoor Track and field
- Lacrosse
- Boys' tennis
- Coed volleyball
- Boys' volleyball

=== Multi-season ===
- Poms
- Cheerleading

=== Rivalries ===
Northwest High School has sports rivalries, particularly in football, with neighboring Seneca Valley High School, and Quince Orchard High School. The annual football game between Northwest and Seneca Valley is known as "The Battle for the King's Trophy" or the "Battle for Germantown". The football rivalry with Quince Orchard is widely considered one of the best in the state, with each school winning three state titles.

=== State championships ===
Northwest High School has won a total of 31 state championships in team events, as well 67 individual state championships.

State championships
Season	Sport	Number of championships	Year
Fall	Cross country, boys'	2	2001, 2002
Fall	Cross country, girls'	2	2002, 2003
Fall	Football	3	2004, 2013, 2014
Fall	Volleyball, girls'	4	2015, 2016, 2017, 2018
Winter	Cheerleading	2	2007, 2008
Winter	Indoor track, boys'	5	2014, 2015, 2016, 2017, 2018
Winter	Indoor track, girls'	1	2011
Winter	Poms	2	2002, 2005
Spring	Baseball	2	2012, 2017
Spring	Outdoor track, boys'	5	2013, 2016, 2017, 2018, 2019
Spring	Outdoor track, girls'	2	2011, 2018
Spring	Softball	1	2017
Total		31	

== Notable alumni ==
- Rei Ami (Sarah Lee) (Class of 2014) - Musician, Actress (KPop Demon Hunters), 4SW Co-Founder, and the Member of Huntr/X with EJAE and Audrey Nuna
- Gottlieb Ayedze (Class of 2019) — NFL offensive tackle for the Philadelphia Eagles
- Kayla DiCello (Class of 2022) — gymnast
- Britt Eckerstrom (Class of 2011) — Portland Thorns FC goalkeeper
- Mia Khalifa (Class of 2011) — adult entertainment actress, sports analyst
- Ashley Nee — Olympic slalom canoeist
- Anwar Phillips (Class of 2001) — NFL player
- Kaden Prather (Class of 2021), American football wide receiver and NFL player for the Buffalo Bills
- Teresa Woorman (Class of 2009) — member of the Maryland House of Delegates
- Joe Young (Class of 2007) — formerly Joe Lefeged, NFL player
