= Caroline Trompeter =

German slalom canoeist (born 1994)

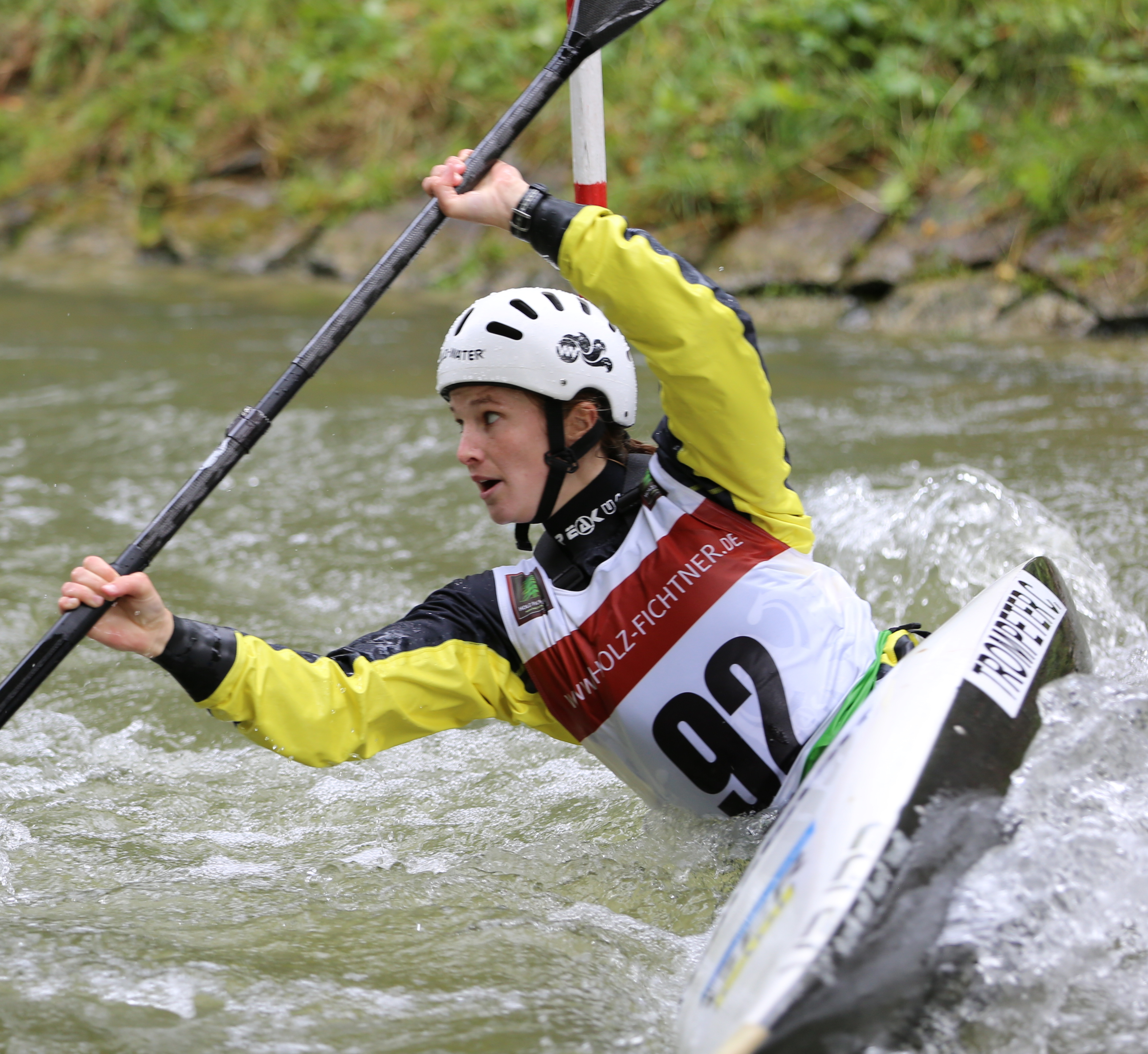
- Trompeter in 2017

Medal record

Women's canoe slalom

Representing Germany

World Championships
Gold medal – first place	2017 Pau	Extreme K1
Bronze medal – third place	2019 Prague	Extreme K1

U23 World Championships
Gold medal – first place	2016 Kraków	K1 team

U23 European Championships
Gold medal – first place	2016 Solkan	K1 team
Silver medal – second place	2014 Skopje	K1 team
Silver medal – second place	2017 Hohenlimburg	K1 team

Junior World Championships
Silver medal – second place	2010 Foix	K1 team
Silver medal – second place	2012 Wausau	K1 team

Junior European Championships
Gold medal – first place	2010 Markkleeberg	K1 team
Gold medal – first place	2011 Banja Luka	K1 team
Silver medal – second place	2012 Solkan	K1 team
Bronze medal – third place	2011 Banja Luka	K1

Caroline Trompeter (born 14 July 1994) is a German slalom canoeist who has competed at the international level since 2010.

She won a gold medal in the inaugural Extreme K1 event at the 2017 ICF Canoe Slalom World Championships in Pau and a bronze medal in the same event in 2019 in Prague.

She won the overall World Cup title in Extreme slalom in 2021.

== World Cup individual podiums ==
Season	Date	Venue	Position	Event
2019	30 June 2019	Tacen	2nd	Extreme K1
2019	1 September 2019	Markkleeberg	1st	Extreme K1
2019	8 September 2019	Prague	3rd	Extreme K1^{1}
2021	20 June 2021	Markkleeberg	2nd	Extreme K1

^{1} World Championship counting for World Cup points
