= Nikita Gubenko =

Russian slalom canoeist (born 1994)

Personal information
- Nationality: Russian
- Born: 1994 (age 31–32)

Sport
- Country: Russia
- Sport: Canoe slalom
- Event: K1, Extreme K1
Medal record
Men's canoe slalom
Representing Russia
World Championships
Silver medal – second place	2019 Prague	Extreme K1
U23 European Championships
Bronze medal – third place	2016 Solkan	K1 team

Nikita Gubenko (born 1994) is a Russian slalom canoeist who has competed at the international level since 2011.

He won a silver medal in the Extreme K1 event at the 2019 Extreme Canoe Slalom World Championships in Prague.

== World Cup individual podiums ==
Season	Date	Venue	Position	Event
2018	1 Jul 2018	Kraków	1st	Extreme K1
2019	8 September 2019	Prague	2nd	Extreme K1^{1}

^{1} World Championship counting for World Cup points
