= Claire Jacquet =

French canoeist

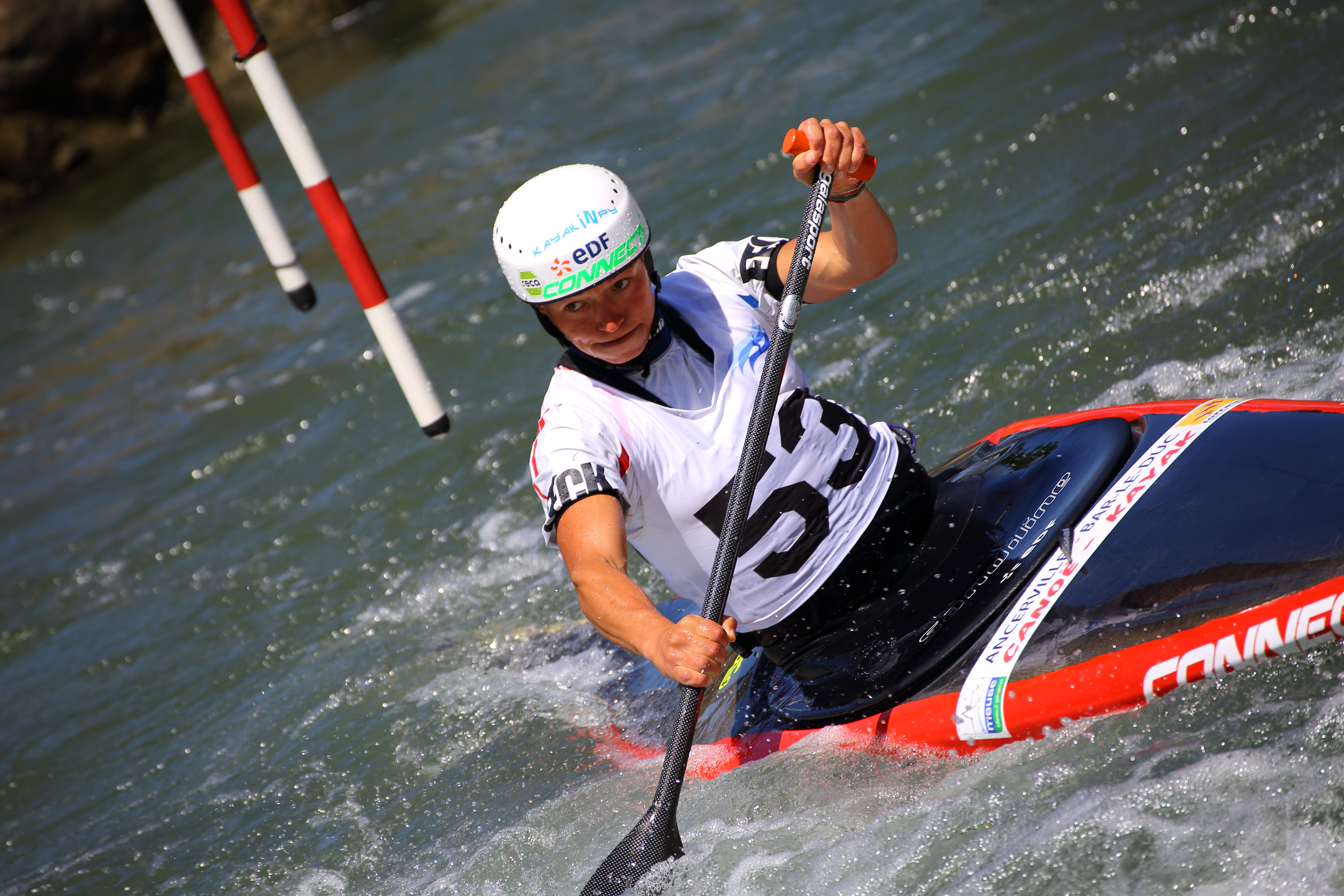

Personal information
- Nationality: French
- Born: 17 May 1988 (age 38) Bar-le-Duc, France
- Height: 1.63 m (5 ft 4 in)
- Weight: 58 kg (128 lb)

Sport
- Country: France
- Sport: Canoe slalom
- Event: C1, K1
- Club: Ancerville-bar Le Duc
Medal record
Women's canoe slalom
Representing France
World Championships
Bronze medal – third place	2018 Rio de Janeiro	C1 team
European Championships
Silver medal – second place	2018 Prague	C1 team
Bronze medal – third place	2020 Prague	C1 team
Junior World Championships
Bronze medal – third place	2006 Solkan	K1 team
Junior European Championships
Bronze medal – third place	2006 Nottingham	K1 team

Claire Jacquet (born 17 May 1988) is a French slalom canoeist who has competed at the international level since 2006.

She won a bronze medal in the C1 team event at the 2018 ICF Canoe Slalom World Championships in Rio de Janeiro. She also won a silver and a bronze medal in the same event at the European Championships.

== World Cup individual podiums ==
Season	Date	Venue	Position	Event
2012	16 June 2012	Pau	3rd	C1
2019	23 June 2019	Bratislava	1st	C1
