= Valley Mill Camp =

Children's day summer camp in Germantown, Maryland, US

Coordinates: 39.082456°N 77.314031°W

Valley Mill is a children's day summer camp and kayaking school in Germantown, Maryland. It is accredited by the American Camp Association.

== History ==
Valley Mill Camp for Girls started in Colesville, Maryland in 1956 by Robert "Mr. Mac" McEwan and May "Skipper" McEwan, and then moved to Darnestown in 1973. Many world-class paddlers have attended the camp.

== Activities ==
Boys Side offers activities such as kayaking, canoeing, swimming lessons, soccer, basketball, rock climbing, outdoor education, gymnastics, archery, air riflery.

Girls Side Offers activities such as kayaking, canoeing, swimming lessons, rock climbing, outdoor education, gymnastics, archery, air riflery, arts and crafts, drama, and horseback riding.

Junior Camp (4 and 5 years old) Offers activities such as kayaking, canoeing, swimming lessons, outdoor education, gymnastics, arts and crafts, drama, and horseback riding.

Adventure Camp Off site trips that include kayaking, hiking, rock climbing, canoeing, and leadership
