= Lucie Prioux =

French canoeist

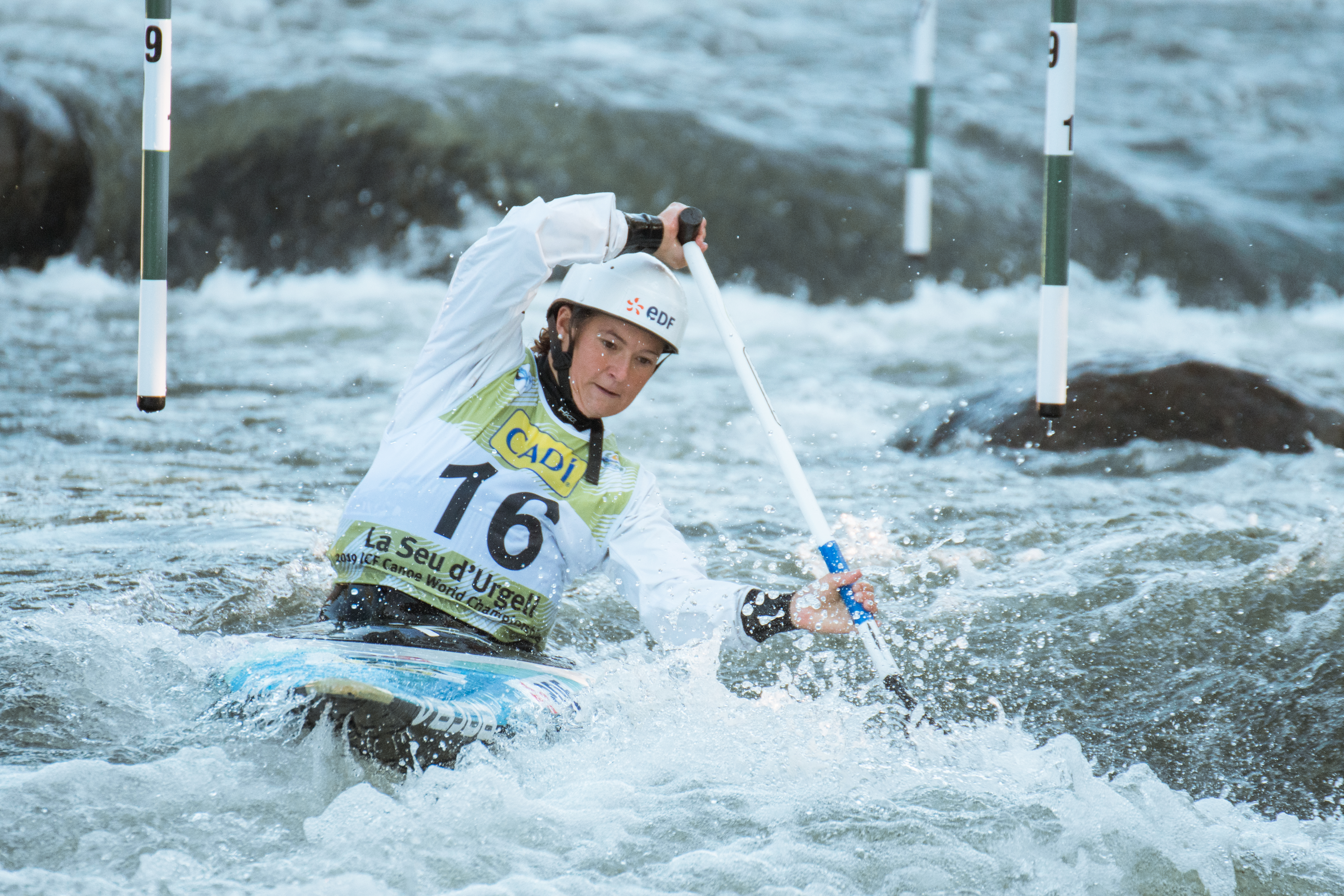

Personal information
- Nationality: French
- Born: 21 July 1997 (age 28)

Sport
- Country: France
- Sport: Canoe slalom
- Rank: No. 20
- Event: C1
Medal record
Women's canoe slalom
Representing France
World Championships
| Bronze medal – third place | 2018 Rio de Janeiro | C1 team |
European Championships
| Silver medal – second place | 2018 Prague | C1 team |
| Bronze medal – third place | 2020 Prague | C1 |
| Bronze medal – third place | 2020 Prague | C1 team |
| Bronze medal – third place | 2021 Ivrea | C1 team |
U23 World Championships
| Silver medal – second place | 2016 Kraków | C1 team |
| Silver medal – second place | 2019 Kraków | C1 team |
U23 European Championships
| Silver medal – second place | 2018 Bratislava | C1 team |
Junior World Championships
| Gold medal – first place | 2014 Penrith | C1 |
| Silver medal – second place | 2015 Foz do Iguaçu | C1 |
Junior European Championships
| Silver medal – second place | 2015 Kraków | C1 team |
| Bronze medal – third place | 2015 Kraków | C1 |

Lucie Prioux (born 21 July 1997) is a French slalom canoeist who has competed at the international level since 2013.

She won a bronze medal in the C1 team event at the 2018 ICF Canoe Slalom World Championships in Rio de Janeiro. She also won a silver and three bronze medals at the European Championships.

== World Cup individual podiums ==
| Season | Date | Venue | Position | Event |
|---|---|---|---|---|
| 2020 | 18 October 2020 | Tacen | 2nd | C1 |
