= Germantown, Maryland =

- Census-designated place
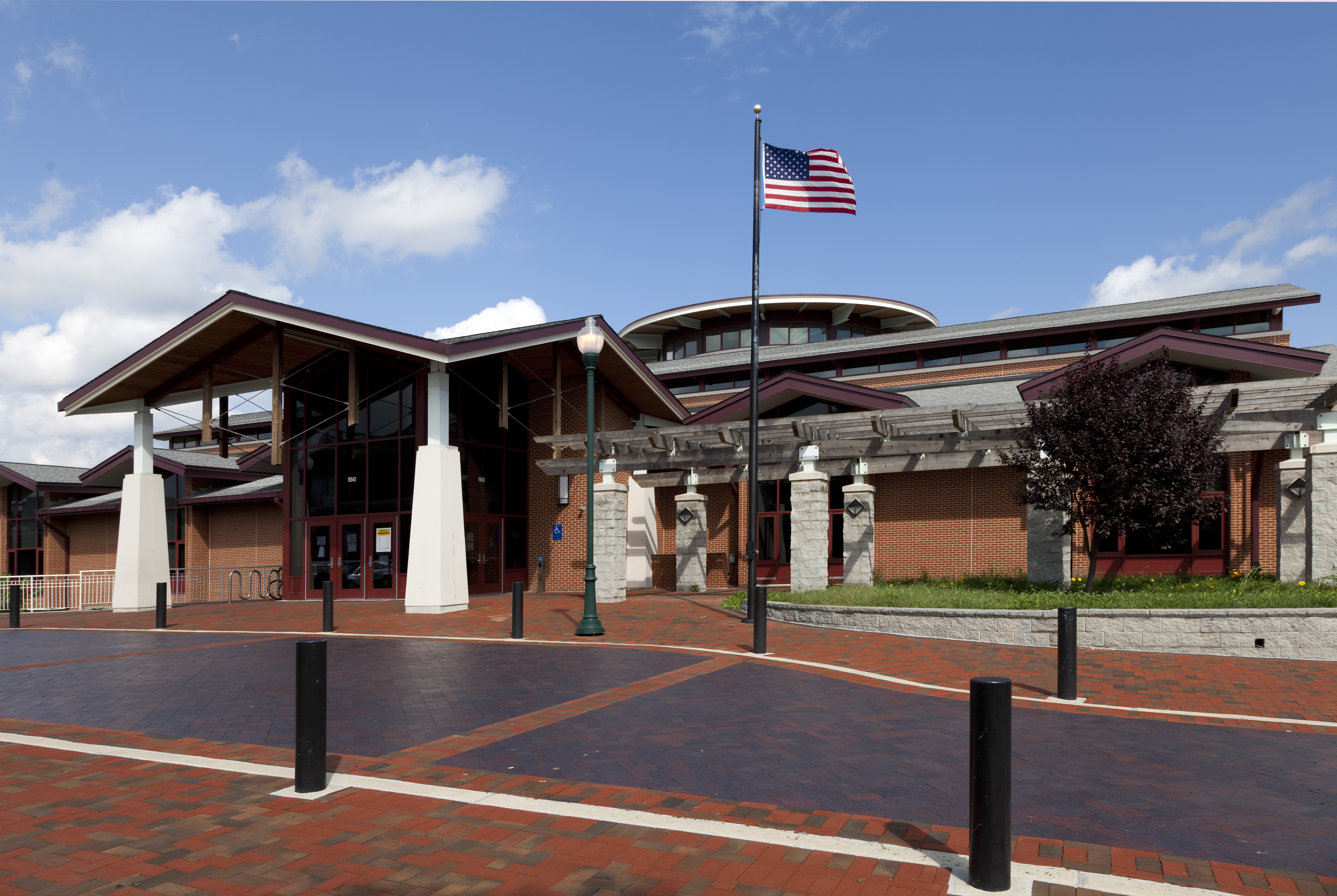
- Germantown Library

- Location of Germantown in Montgomery County, Maryland

- Location within Maryland Location within the United States
- Coordinates: 39°11′0″N 77°16′0″W
- Country: United States
- State: Maryland
- County: Montgomery

Area
  - Total: 17.12 sq mi (44.35 km^{2})
  - Land: 17.03 sq mi (44.12 km^{2})
  - Water: 0.089 sq mi (0.23 km^{2})
- Elevation: 489 ft (149 m)

Population (2020)
  - Total: 91,249
  - Density: 5,357/sq mi (2,068.4/km^{2})
- Time zone: UTC−5 (Eastern (EST))
  - Summer (DST): UTC−4 (EDT)
- ZIP code: 20874, 20875 (PO box only), 20876
- Area codes: 301, 240
- FIPS code: 24-32025
- GNIS feature ID: 2389836

Germantown is an urbanized census-designated place in Montgomery County, Maryland, United States. With a population of 91,249 as of the 2020 census, it is the third-most populous community in Maryland, after Baltimore and Columbia. Germantown is located approximately 28 miles (45 km) outside the U.S. capital of Washington, D.C., and is an important part of the Washington metropolitan area.

Germantown was founded in the early 19th century by European immigrants, though much of the area's development did not take place until the mid-20th century. The original plan for Germantown divided the area into a downtown and six town villages: Gunners Lake Village, Kingsview Village, Churchill Village, Middlebrook Village, Clopper's Mill Village, and Neelsville Village. The Churchill Town Sector at the corner of Maryland Route 118 and Middlebrook Road most closely resembles the center of Germantown because of the location of the Upcounty Regional Services Center, the Germantown Public Library, the Black Rock Arts Center, and pedestrian shopping that features an array of restaurants. Three exits to Interstate 270 are less than one mile away, the Maryland Area Regional Commuter train is within walking distance, and the Germantown Transit Center that provides Ride On shuttle service to the Shady Grove station of the Washington Metro's Red Line is also available.

Germantown has the assigned ZIP codes of 20874 and 20876 for delivery and 20875 for post office boxes. It is the only "Germantown, Maryland" recognized by the United States Postal Service, though three other Maryland counties have unincorporated communities with the same name.

== History ==
=== Early history (1830–1865) ===
In the 1830s and 1840s, the central business area was focused around the intersection of Liberty Mill Road and Clopper Road. Several German immigrants set up shop at the intersection and the town became known as "German Town", even though most residents of the town were of English or Scottish descent.

==== American Civil War ====
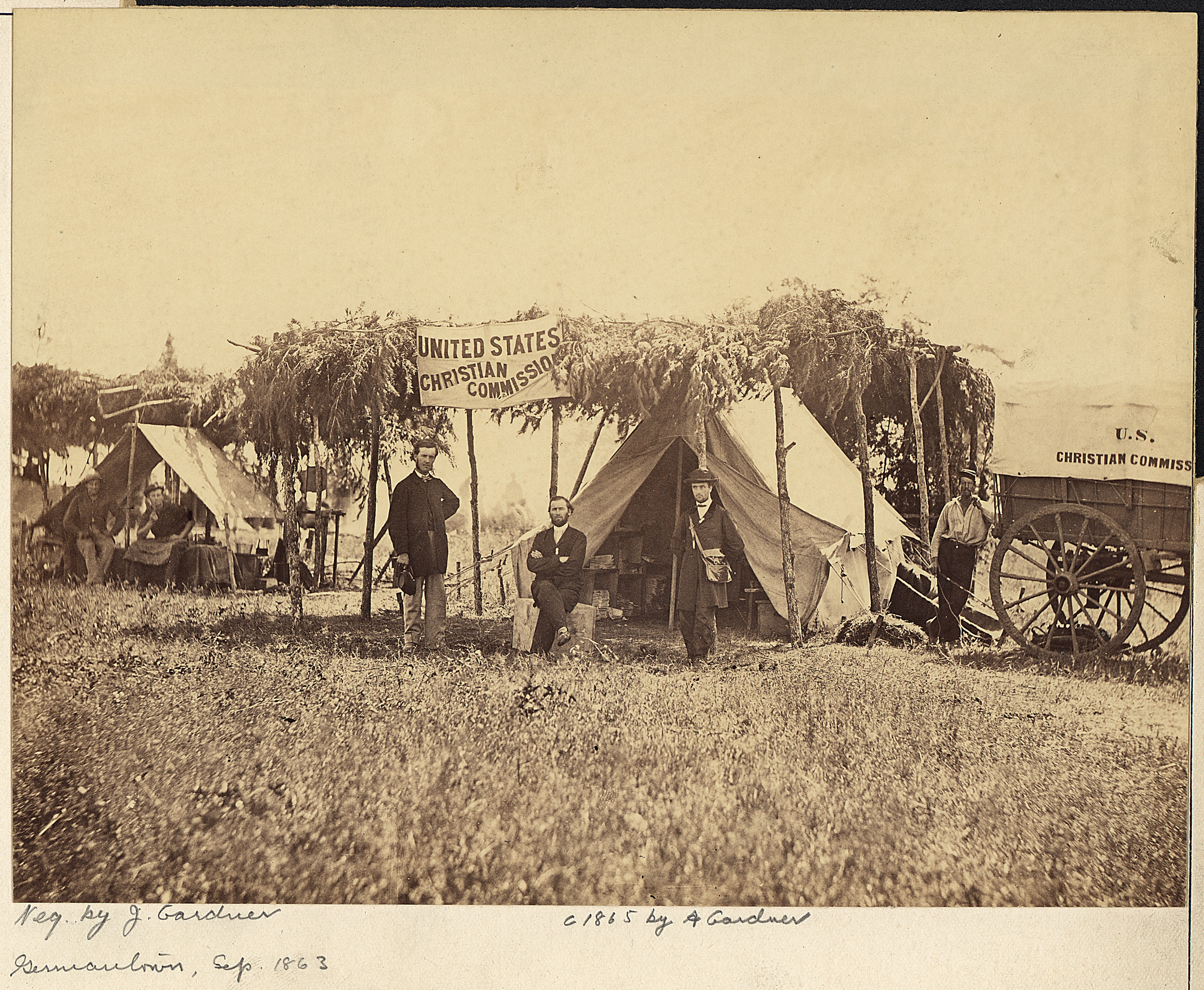
A field headquarters of the U.S. Christian Commission at Germantown in September 1863

Although it avoided much of the physical destruction that ravaged other cities in the region, the Civil War was still a cause of resentment and division among residents of Germantown. Many Germantown residents were against slavery and had sons fighting for the Union Army. In contrast, other residents of Germantown owned slaves, and even those who were not slave-owners had sons fighting for the Confederate Army. As a result, many people in Germantown, who had been on friendly terms with each other, made an effort not to interact with each other, such as switching churches, or frequenting a store or mill miles away from the ones they would normally do business with.

Late in the summer and fall of 1861, there were more than twenty thousand Union soldiers camped to the west of Germantown, in neighboring Darnestown and Poolesville. Occasionally, these soldiers would come to Germantown and frequent the stores there. In September 1862 and in June 1863, several regiments of Union Army soldiers marched north on Maryland Route 355, on their way to the battles of Antietam and Gettysburg, respectively. In July 1864, General Jubal Early led his army of Confederate soldiers down Maryland Route 355 to attack the Union capital of Washington, D.C. Throughout the course of the war, Confederate raiders would often pass through the Germantown area. Local farmers in the Germantown area lost horses and other livestock to both Union and Confederate armies.

==== Assassination of Abraham Lincoln ====
In 1865, George Atzerodt, a co-conspirator in the assassination of U.S. President Abraham Lincoln, was captured in Germantown. Atzerodt had come to the town with his family from Prussia when he was about nine years old. About five years later, his father moved the family to Virginia, but Atzerodt still had many friends and relatives in Germantown. He was living in Port Tobacco during the Civil War, and supplementing his meager income as a carriage painter by smuggling people across the Potomac River in a rowboat. This clandestine occupation brought him into contact with John Surratt and John Wilkes Booth and he was drawn into a plot to kidnap President Lincoln. On April 14, 1865, Booth gave Atzerodt a gun and told him that he was to kill U.S. Vice President Andrew Johnson, which he refused to do. When he found out that Booth had shot Lincoln, Atzerodt panicked and fled to the Germantown farm of his cousin Hartman Richter, on Schaeffer Road near Clopper Road. He was discovered there by soldiers on April 20, six days after the assassination. Atzerodt was tried, convicted and hanged on July 7, 1865, along with co-conspirators Mary Surratt, Lewis Powell, and David Herold at Washington, D.C.'s Fort McNair.

=== Expansion (1865–1950) ===
Germantown did not have a public school until after the end of the American Civil War. During that time, education was handled at home. In 1868, a one-room schoolhouse was built on Maryland Route 118, near Black Rock Road, which hosted children from both Germantown and neighboring Darnestown. In 1883, a larger one-room schoolhouse was built closer to Clopper Road. Another, newer school was constructed in 1910, on what is now the site of Germantown Elementary School. This school had four rooms, with two downstairs and two upstairs, with each room housing two grade levels. After the eighth grade, the students would head via train to nearby Rockville, for further education.

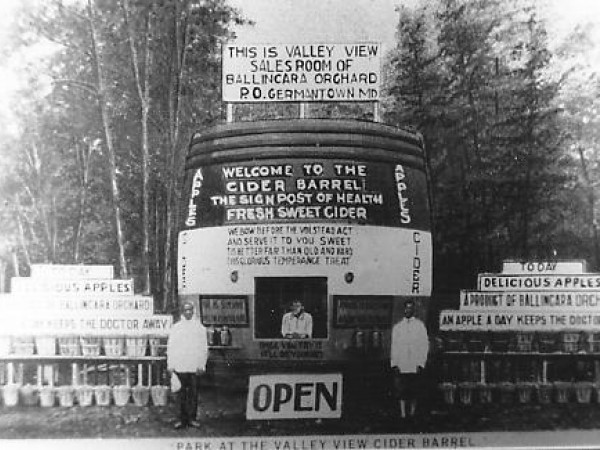
The Germantown Cider Barrel in 1925

The wooden structure of the Bowman Brothers Mill fell victim to a fire in 1914. Four years later, the owners were back in business again, selling the mill to the Liberty Milling Company, a brand new corporation. Augustus Selby was the first owner and manager of the new Liberty Mill, which opened in 1918. Electricity was brought into Liberty Mill and also served the homes and businesses nearby, making Germantown the first area in the northern portion of Montgomery County to receive electricity.

In 1935, professional baseball player Walter Perry Johnson, who played as a pitcher for the Washington Senators (now the Minnesota Twins), purchased a farm on what is now the site of Seneca Valley High School. Used as a dairy farm, Johnson lived there with his five children and his mother (his wife had died), until his death in 1946. A road near the school was named after him.

"Feed the Liberty Way" was used as a slogan for Liberty Mill which, with eight silos, became the second largest mill in all of Maryland, supplying flour to the United States Army during World War II. Cornmeal and animal feed were also manufactured at Liberty Mill, and a store at the mill sold specialty mixes, such as pancake and muffin mix. Following the end of World War II, the Liberty Mill went into disrepair. For over 25 years, the mill continued to deteriorate until it was destroyed by an arsonist on May 30, 1972. The cement silos were removed by the county in 1986 to make way for the MARC Germantown train station commuter parking lot.

=== Development and master plan (1950–1980) ===
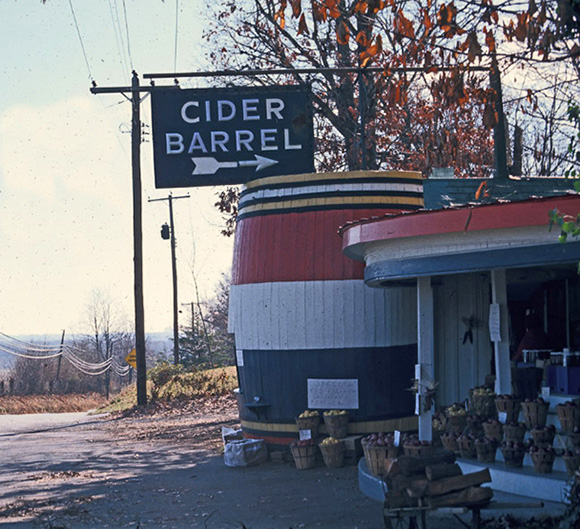
In 1966, Cider Barrel Mobile Home Park was in its early years. It closed in 2003.

In January 1958, the U.S. Atomic Energy Commission was relocated from its location in downtown Washington, D.C., to Germantown, which was considered far enough from the city to withstand a Soviet nuclear attack. The facility now operates as an administration complex for the U.S. Department of Energy and headquarters for its Office of Biological and Environmental Research.

Marshall Davis owned a farm located where I-270 and Germantown Road intersect today. After I-270 divided his farm in two, Davis decided to sell the last of his land to the International Development Corporation for about $1,300 per acre in 1955. Fairchild-Hiller Corporation bought the land for about $4,000 per acre in 1964, and it built an industrial park on the land four years later. Harry Unglesee and his family sold their farm near Hoyles Mill Road for less than $1,000 per acre in 1959. Other farmers soon sold their land to developers and speculators as well.

The Germantown Master Plan was adopted in 1967. The plan for the 17-square-mile (44 km^{2}) area included a dense central downtown area and less dense development surrounding it. In 1967, the Washington Metropolitan Area Transit Authority, in its planning of the Washington metro, considered having Germantown be the western terminus for the Red Line. Ultimately, Shady Grove was selected instead.

In 1974, the Montgomery County Council approved an amended plan written by the Montgomery County Planning Board. The amended plan included a downtown area and six separate villages, each comprising smaller neighborhoods with schools, shopping areas, and public facilities. The amended plan also included the construction of a third campus for Montgomery College near the downtown area. The same year, the completion of a sewer line helped the development and growth of Germantown.

During the 1970s, Wernher von Braun, a German rocket scientist during World War II, worked for the aerospace company Fairchild Industries, which had offices in Germantown, as its vice president for Engineering and Development. Von Braun worked at Fairchild Industries from July 1, 1972, until his death on June 16, 1977. The A-10 Thunderbolt and the landing gear of the Space Shuttle were both designed at these offices.

The Germantown Campus of Montgomery College opened on October 21, 1978. At the time, it consisted of two buildings, 24 employees, and 1,200 students. Enrollment had increased to five thousand students by 2003, with eighty employees across four buildings. A steel water tower modeled after the Earth can be seen from orbiting satellites in outer space. As of 2008, a forty-acre bio-technology laboratory was nearing completion.

=== Economic growth and modern development (1980–present) ===
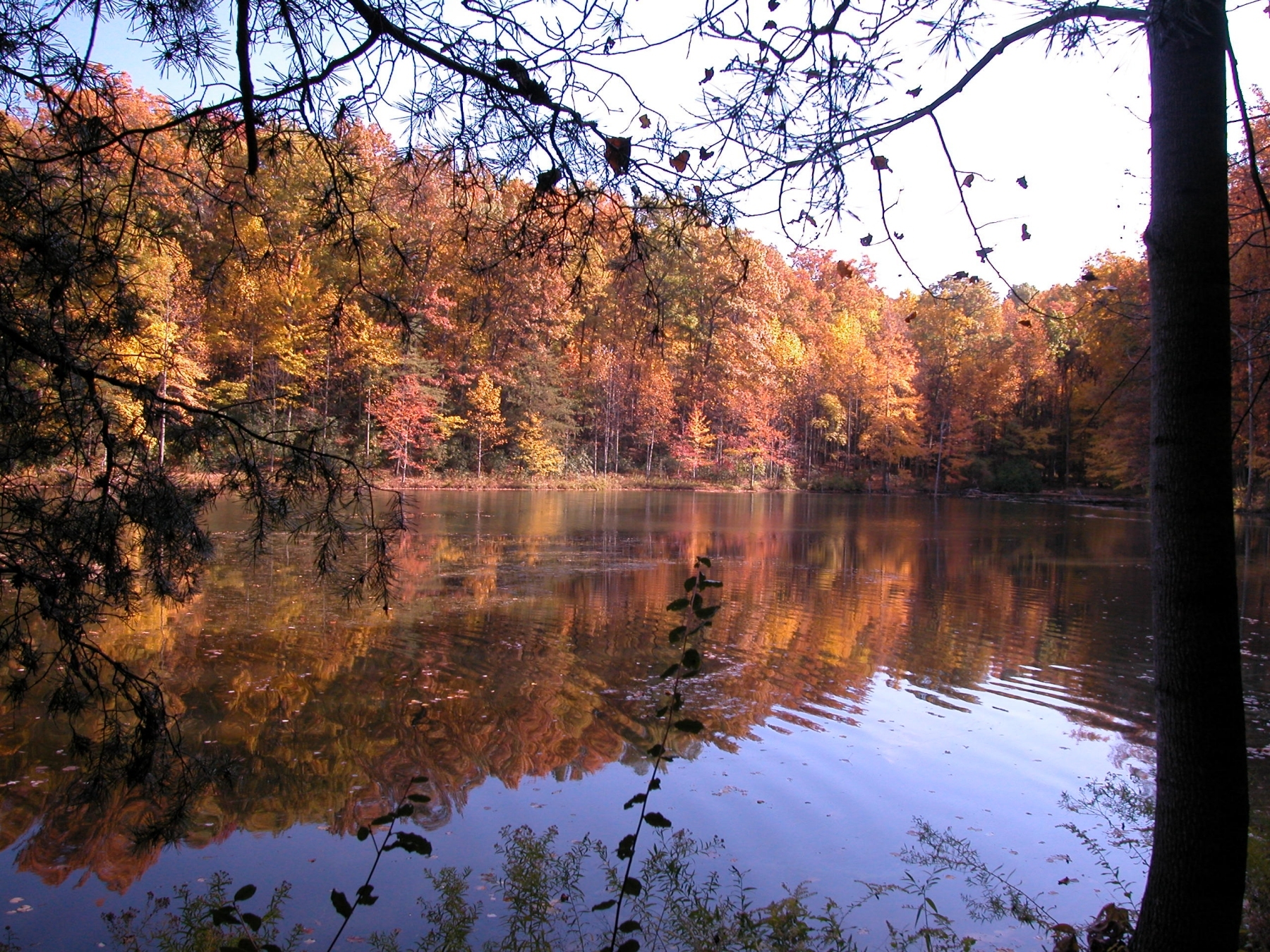
Seneca Creek State Park's Clopper Lake in October 2002

Since the early 1980s, Germantown has experienced rapid economic and population growth, both in the form of townhouses and single-family dwellings, and an urbanized "town center" has been built. Germantown was the fastest-growing ZIP code in the Washington metropolitan area and Maryland in 1986, and the 1980s saw a population growth of 323.3% for Germantown.

In 2000, the Upcounty Regional Services Center opened in Germantown, and a 16,000 square feet section of the first floor was home to the Germantown Public Library for several years until it moved to a new, 19 million dollar complex in 2007. On September 29, 2013, it was renamed as the Sidney Kramer Upcounty Regional Services Center after Sidney Kramer, Montgomery County executive from 1986 to 1990.

In October 2000, the Maryland SoccerPlex opened in Germantown. The sports complex includes nineteen natural grass fields, three artificial fields, a 5,200 seat soccer stadium with lighting and press box, eight indoor convertible basketball/volleyball courts. Two miniature golf courses, a splash park, a driving range, an archery course, community garden, model boat pond, two BMX courses, tennis center, and a swim center are also located within the confines of the complex. The soccerplex was the home of the Washington Spirit of the National Women's Soccer League from 2013 to 2019.

On October 14, 2002, the D.C. snipers briefly stopped at Milestone Shopping center in Germantown.

In 2003, one of Germantown's trailer parks, the Cider Barrel Mobile Home Park, closed after decades of operation, having been in business since at least the 1970s. Despite this closure, the Barrel building itself was preserved, with a cluster of garden apartments erected near it.

On August 14, 2011, a 7-Eleven convenience store in downtown Germantown fell victim to a flash mob robbery of nearly forty people. The incident garnered widespread attention in the United States and internationally.

Holy Cross Health opened a 237,000-square-foot (22,000 m^{2}) hospital on the campus of Montgomery College in October 2014, becoming the first hospital in the U.S. to be built on a community college campus. The opening of the new 93-bed hospital strengthened the college's medical program by giving students the opportunity for hands-on work and access to more advanced medical technology. The hospital was projected to eventually bring 5,000 new jobs to the area.

In August 2017, Brandi Edinger initiated efforts to crowdfund the repurposing of the historic Cider Barrel as a bakery via Kickstarter, but failed to meet the $80,000 goal set. On January 1, 2020, it was reported that plans are underway to reopen the Barrel in the spring of that year after it was closed for nearly two decades. However, due to the COVID-19 pandemic it had been delayed indefinitely. The barrel structure was vandalized in April 2023.

== Geography ==
According to the United States Census Bureau, the community has a total area of 10.9 sq mi (28.0 km^{2}), of which all but 0.039 sq mi (0.1 km^{2}) (0.46%) is land.

=== Climate ===
Germantown lies within the humid subtropical climate zone (Köppen Cfa), with hot, humid summers, cool winters, and generous precipitation year-round. Its location above the Fall Line in the Piedmont region gives it slightly lower temperatures than cities to the south and east such as Washington, D.C., and Silver Spring. Summers are hot and humid with frequent afternoon thunderstorms. July is the warmest month, with an average temperature of 86 °F (30.0 °C). Winters are cool but variable, with sporadic snowfall and lighter rain showers of longer duration. January is the coldest month, with an average temperature of 29 °F (−1.7 °C). Average annual rainfall totals 40.36 in (103 cm).

== Demographics ==
Historical population
Census	Pop.	Note	%±
1980	9,721		—
1990	41,145		323.3%
2000	55,419		34.7%
2010	86,395		55.9%
2020	91,249		5.6%
Source: 2010–2020

=== 2020 census ===
As of the 2020 census, Germantown had a population of 91,249. The median age was 36.6 years. 24.2% of residents were under the age of 18 and 10.0% of residents were 65 years of age or older. For every 100 females there were 91.6 males, and for every 100 females age 18 and over there were 87.6 males age 18 and over.

99.9% of residents lived in urban areas, while 0.1% lived in rural areas.

There were 32,115 households in Germantown, of which 38.0% had children under the age of 18 living in them. Of all households, 49.7% were married-couple households, 15.9% were households with a male householder and no spouse or partner present, and 29.1% were households with a female householder and no spouse or partner present. About 22.2% of all households were made up of individuals and 5.8% had someone living alone who was 65 years of age or older.

There were 33,305 housing units, of which 3.6% were vacant. The homeowner vacancy rate was 0.9% and the rental vacancy rate was 5.5%.

Racial composition as of the 2020 census
Race	Number	Percent
White	26,150	28.7%
Black or African American	23,615	25.9%
American Indian and Alaska Native	679	0.7%
Asian	18,629	20.4%
Native Hawaiian and Other Pacific Islander	52	0.1%
Hispanic or Latino (of any race)	21,100	23.1%
Two or more races	10,708	11.7%
Some other race	11,416	12.5%

=== 2010 census ===
As of the census of 2010, there were 86,395 people, and 30,531 households residing in the area. The population density was 8,019 inhabitants per square mile (3,096/km^{2}). The racial makeup of the area was 36.3% White, 21.8% African American, 0.2% Native American, 19.7% Asian, 0.03% Pacific Islander, 0.3% from other races, and 3.3% from two or more races. Hispanic or Latino were 18.4% of the population.

There were 20,893 households, out of which 41.2% had children under the age of 18 living with them, 49.8% were married couples living together, 13.7% had a female householder with no husband present, and 32.4% were non-families. 23.5% of all households were made up of individuals, and 1.8% had someone living alone who was 65 years of age or older. The average household size was 2.80 and the average family size was 3.19.

In the area, the population was spread out, with 28.9% under the age of 18, 7.7% from 18 to 24, 43.0% from 25 to 44, 17.3% from 45 to 64, and 3.1% who were 65 years of age or older. The median age was 31 years. For every 100 females, there were 94.9 males. For every 100 females age 18 and over, there were 90.6 males.

Population by race in Germantown, Maryland (2010)
Race	Population	% of Total
Total	86,395	100
Caucasian	31,102	36.3
African American	18,813	21.8
Asian	17,001	19.7
Hispanic	15,879	18.4
Other	258	0.3
Two or more races	2,847	3.3
American Indian	172	0.2

=== Other statistics ===
The median income for a household in Germantown was $76,061 as of a 2010 estimate by the website, City-Data. 6.5% of the population and 3.5% of families were below the poverty line. Out of the total people living in poverty, 5.9% are under the age of 18 and 9.9% are 65 or older.

In 2023, WalletHub honored Germantown as the most ethnically diverse city in the United States.

== Economy ==
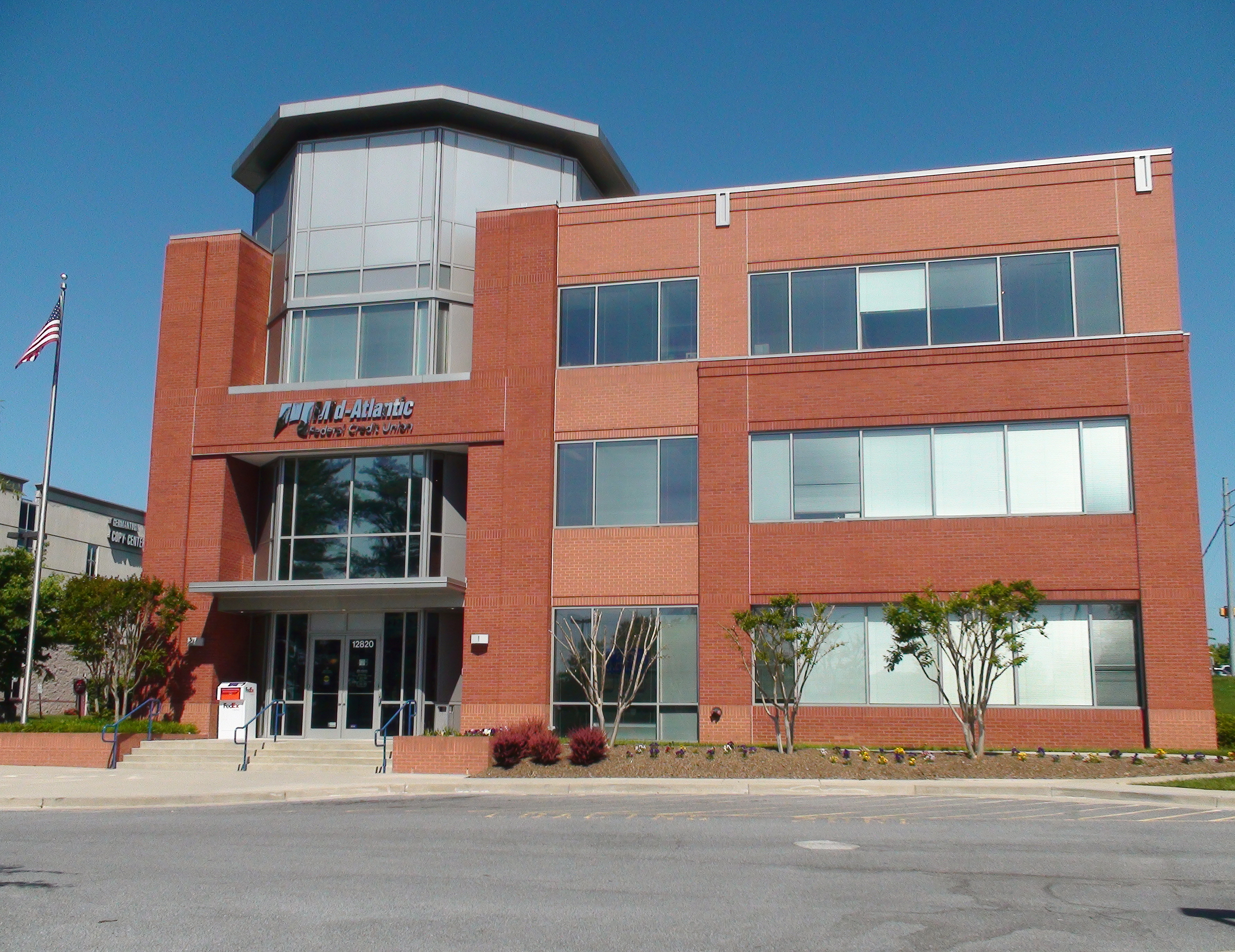
The headquarters of the Mid-Atlantic Federal Credit Union in May 2014

Since development began in the late 20th century, Germantown has experienced economies of agglomeration, with many high-tech companies opening headquarters and other offices in Germantown and other areas along the I-270 corridor. Qiagen North America, Earth Network Systems Inc., Digital Receiver Technology Inc., Mid-Atlantic Federal Credit Union, and Hughes Network Systems all have their headquarters in Germantown.

In addition to the companies headquartered in Germantown, many have offices in the area, including Wabtec, Viasat, RADA USA, Mars Symbioscience, Xerox, General Electric Aviation, Earth Networks, WeatherBug, and Proxy Aviation Systems.

== Government ==
Despite its size, Germantown has never been incorporated formally as a town or a city. It has no mayor or city council and is thus governed by Montgomery County. It is now represented by Democrat Marilyn Balcombe in the Montgomery County Council, after being represented by Craig L. Rice from 2010 through 2022. Germantown is part of two districts for the Maryland General Assembly, 15 (ZIP code 20874), and 39 (ZIP code 20876). For the US Congress, it is part of Maryland's 6th district.

The U.S. Department of Energy has its headquarters for the Office of Biological and Environmental Research in Germantown. The U.S. Atomic Energy Commission was moved from its location in downtown Washington, D.C., to the present-day U.S. Department of Energy building in Germantown because of fears of a Soviet nuclear attack on the U.S. capital. At the time, Germantown was believed to be far enough from Washington, D.C., to avoid the worst effects of a nuclear strike on the city. The facility now operates as an administration complex for the U.S. Department of Energy.

== Education ==
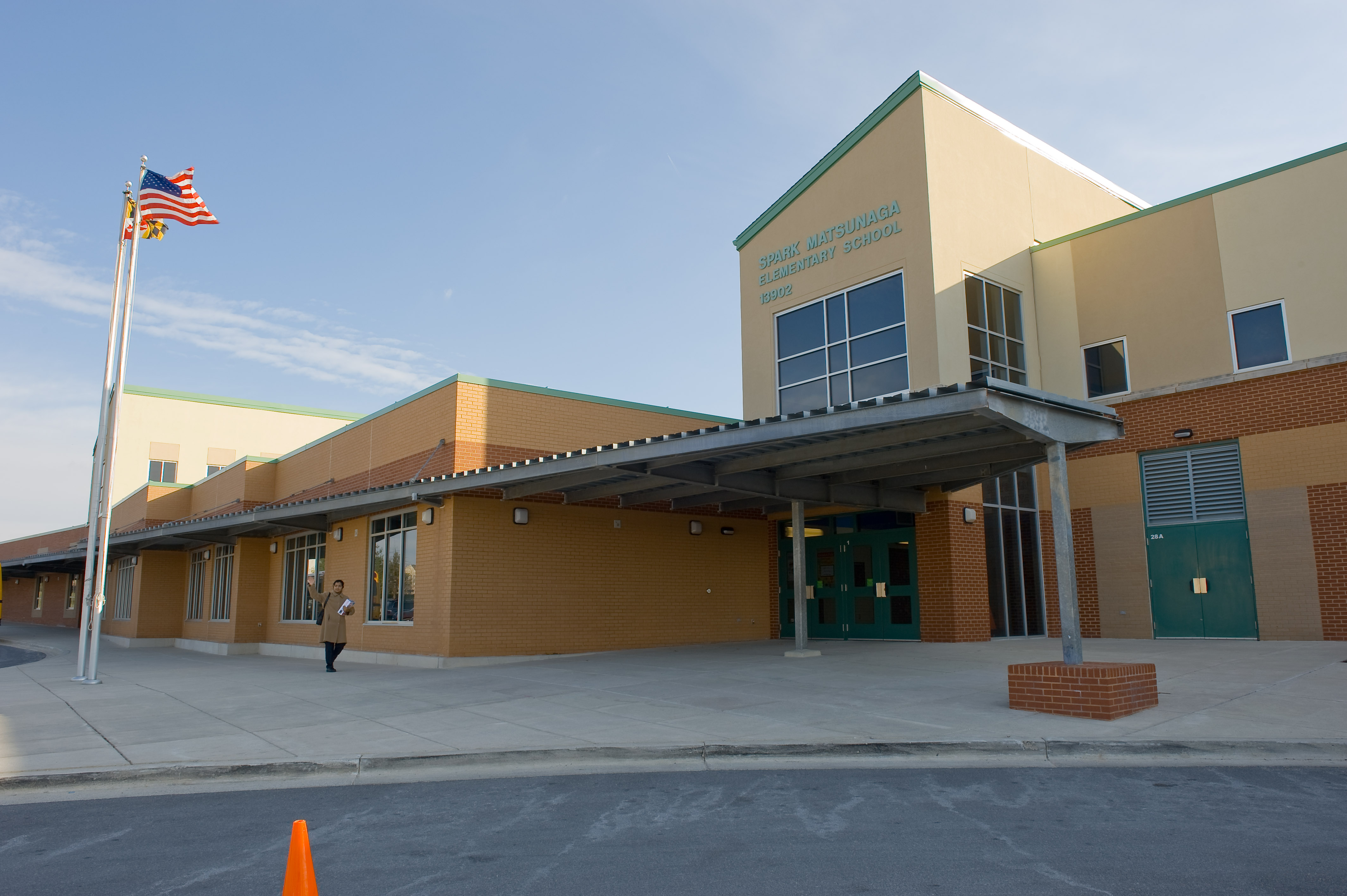
Spark Matsunaga Elementary School in 2009

All the public schools in Germantown are part of the Montgomery County Public Schools (MCPS) system. The elementary schools in Germantown are Cedar Grove Elementary School, Clopper Mill Elementary School, Fox Chapel Elementary School, Germantown Elementary School, Great Seneca Creek Elementary School, Captain James E. Daly Jr. Elementary School, Lake Seneca Elementary School, Ronald McNair Elementary School, Sally K. Ride Elementary School, Spark Matsunaga Elementary School, S. Christa McAuliffe Elementary School, Waters Landing Elementary School, and William B. Gibbs Jr. Elementary School.

The four middle schools are Kingsview Middle School, Dr. Martin Luther King Jr. Middle School, Neelsville Middle School, and Roberto W. Clemente Middle School, which feed into three high schools: Northwest High School, Clarksburg High School and Seneca Valley High School. Students from Kingsview move on to Northwest, students from Neelsville move on to Clarksburg while those from Dr. Martin Luther King Jr. and Roberto W. Clemente Middle Schools move on to Seneca Valley High School. Additionally, the Longview School, which provides special education services, is located in Germantown.

Montgomery College, the largest higher education institution in Montgomery County, has its largest campus in Germantown. It is located on Observation Drive not far from the downtown area.

== Culture ==
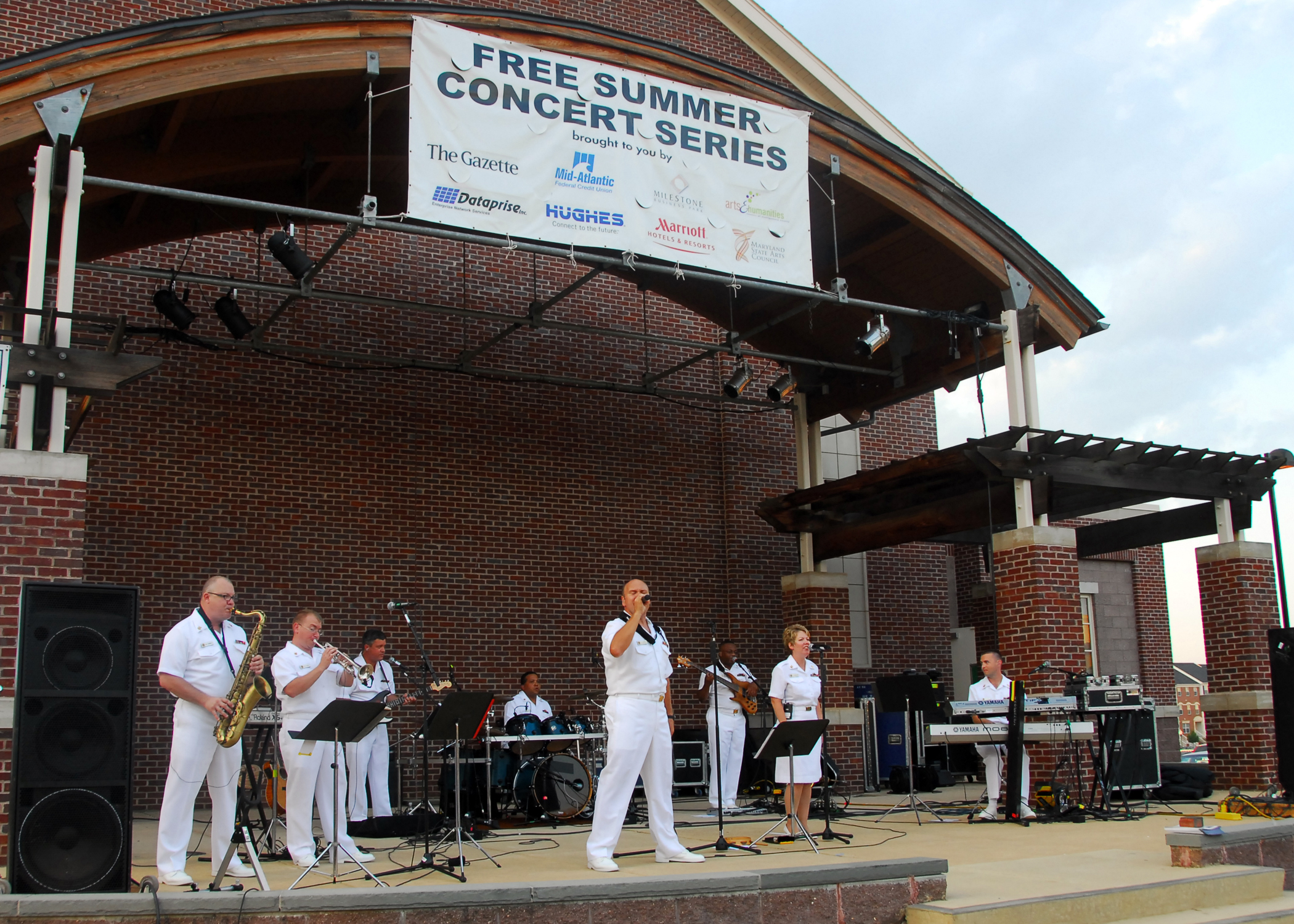
Sailors from the United States Navy Band perform at the BlackRock Center for the Arts in Germantown, Maryland, on August 1, 2009.

=== Music ===
The BlackRock Center for the Arts is located in the downtown Germantown, at the Germantown Town Center. The BlackRock Center for the Arts also sponsors the Germantown Oktoberfest, an annual festival held every year in the fall, which includes various genres of music, including traditional German folk, rock and pop. The Harmony Express Men's Chorus is a 4-part a cappella men's chorus based in Germantown.

The band Clutch is also from Germantown. Members of the group attended Seneca Valley High School together, with several members graduating with the Class of 1989. Two years later, in 1991, the band was formed.

=== Sports ===
The Maryland SoccerPlex sports complex is located in Germantown. Maureen Hendrick's Field at Championship Stadium hosts many amateur, collegiate, and regional soccer and lacrosse tournaments. The Montgomery County Road Runners Club annually hosts the Riley's Rumble Half Marathon & 8K that starts and finishes in the SoccerPlex. The SoccerPlex formerly hosted the Washington Spirit of the National Women's Soccer League. The Germantown Swim Center is also located within the SoccerPlex. The swim center has hosted many major swimming events including Metros and the 2022 Landmark Conference Swimming & Diving Championship.

=== Historical society ===
The Germantown Historical Society (GHS) was formed in 1990 as a non-profit organization with a mission to educate the public about local history and preserve local historic sites. The GHS office and future museum is located in the historic Germantown Bank (1922) at 19330 Mateny Hill Road, across from the MARC railroad station. The GHS offers lectures on local history and has traveling exhibits about Germantown. It also sells the books, Liberty Mill T-shirts, and other souvenirs. The main fundraiser for the organization is the Germantown Community Flea Market, held on the first Saturday of the month April through November in the MARC parking lot, Rt. 118 and Bowman Mill Drive, featuring more than 150 vendors.

=== Media ===
Germantown is served by a news and information website known as the Germantown Pulse. The Germantown Pulse covers a wide range of topics, including sports, schools, crime, music, and other events of note in the area. However, its main website ceased to update by August 2019.

=== Veterans ===
Germantown veterans are served by the Vietnam Veterans Memorial, American Legion Post 295. American Legion Post 295 sponsors Cub Scout Pack 436, a Venturing Crew and is establishing a Sea Scout Ship. American Legion Boys State and American Legion Baseball have been longtime programs supported by the Post.

== Transportation ==
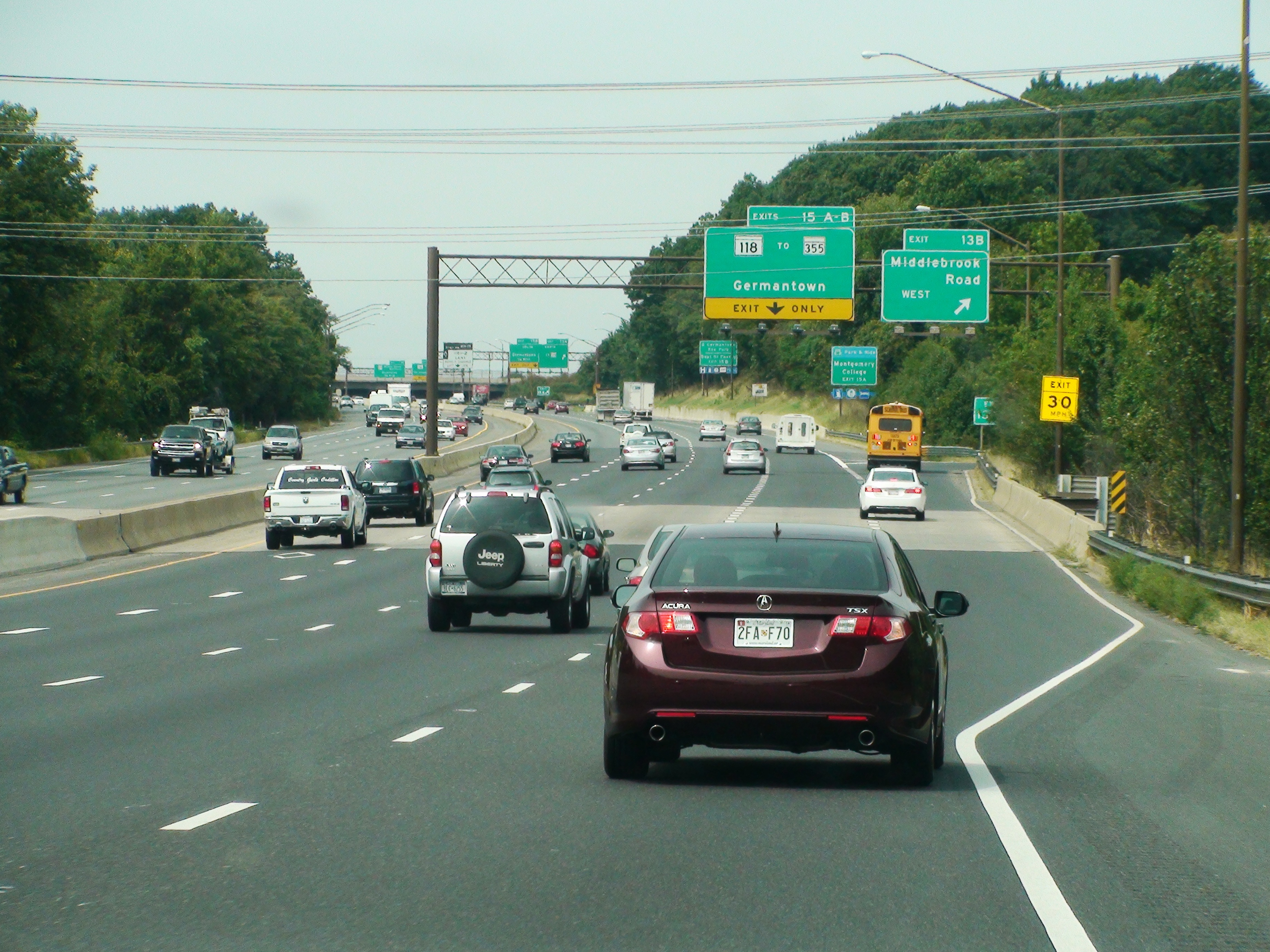
I-270 (northbound) in Germantown

Germantown is bisected by I-270, one of Maryland's busiest highways. Northbound traffic heads toward Frederick and I-270 and southbound traffic heads toward Bethesda and the Capital Beltway. I-270 has three exits in Germantown.

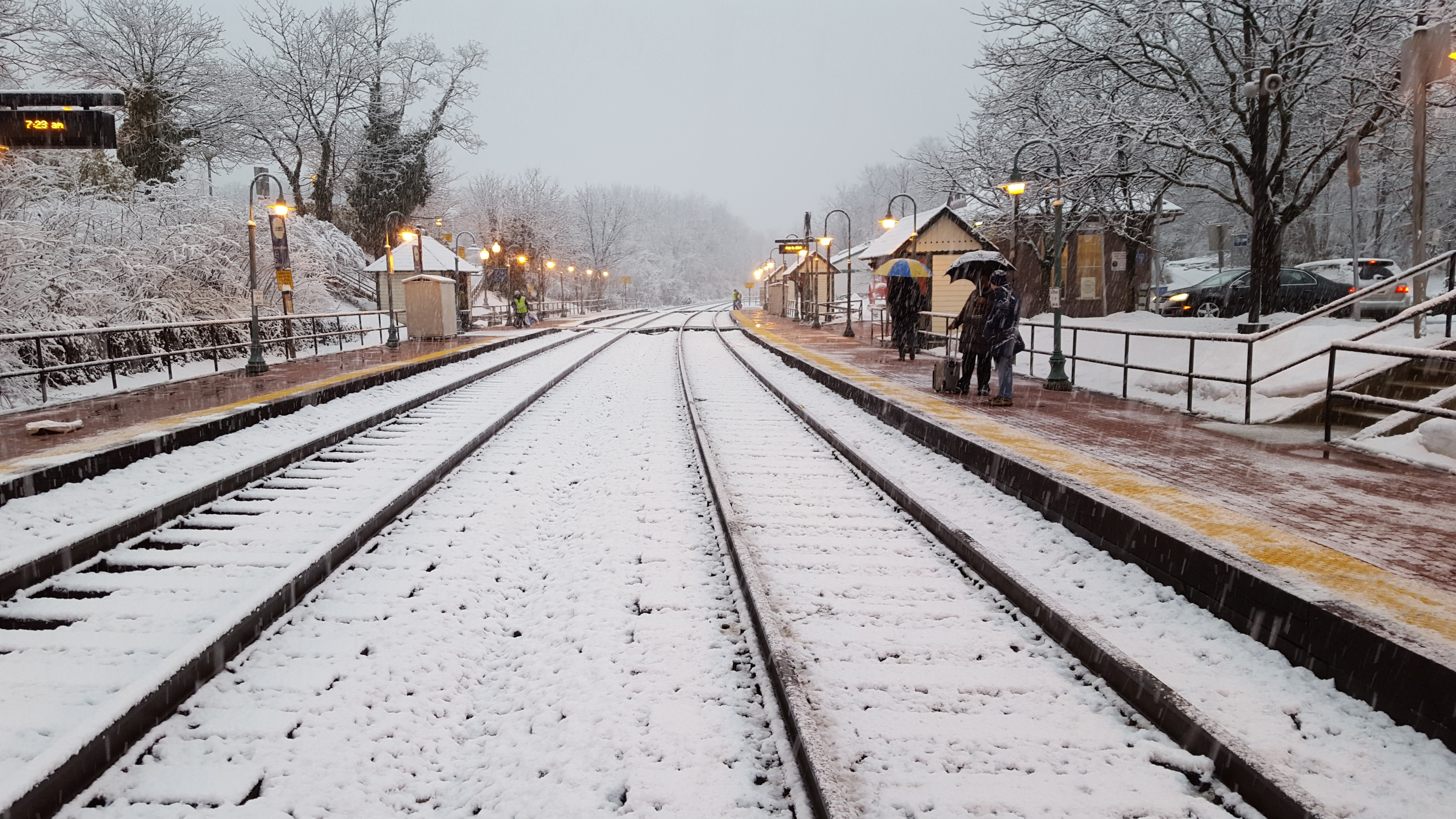
Germantown MARC station

Germantown also has a station on the MARC train's Brunswick Line, which operates over CSX's Metropolitan Subdivision. The station building itself, at the corner of Liberty Mill Road and Mateny Hill Road, is a copy of the original 1891 structure designed by E. Francis Baldwin for the Baltimore and Ohio Railroad. The modern station building was rebuilt after it was destroyed by arson in 1978.

The Montgomery County public transit bus system, Ride On, serving Montgomery County with over 100 bus routes, operates a major transit hub in Germantown known as the Germantown Transit Center. The transit center serves approximately 20 routes, making it one of the largest transit centers in the county.

As of 2017, a light rail system, the Corridor Cities Transitway, is under evaluation. If constructed, the system would connect the terminal of the Washington Metro Red Line, Shady Grove station in nearby Derwood to Germantown and continue northward to Clarksburg.

== In popular culture ==
Sam Fisher, the protagonist of the Tom Clancy's Splinter Cell video game series, lives on a farm in rural Germantown, according to the novelizations of the series.

Germantown is featured in the video game Fallout 3 (2008). After the town is destroyed by a nuclear war, 'Germantown Police HQ' becomes a mutant-run prison camp. The in-game 'Germantown Police HQ' name is actually a misnomer; the single real-life police station in Germantown is a county station.

Germantown is included in several episodes of the U.S. television series The X-Files, notably as a hotbed for biomedical engineering and research, as in reality. There are indeed a handful of biomedical research facilities in the area. The show's creator, Chris Carter, stated that he decided to set several episodes in Germantown as his brother used to live in the town. In one or more episodes, Germantown is depicted as being near a wharf or harbor; this is not accurate to the actual area.

== Notable people ==
- Steve Armas, soccer player and coach
- Filip Burnett, soccer player
- Members of rock band Clutch, attended and formed the band at Seneca Valley High School
- Danny Heater, a high school basketball player and single game scoring record holder lived in Germantown
- Members of rock band, Hootie and the Blowfish, attended Seneca Valley High School
- Walter Perry Johnson, a professional baseball pitcher for the Washington Senators, lived on a dairy farm in Germantown (where Seneca Valley High School currently stands) with his mother and children, from 1935 to his death in 1946
- Mia Khalifa, Lebanese pornographic actress and media personality, attended Northwest High School
- Bobby Liebling of doom metal band Pentagram
- Jake Rozhansky (born 1996), American-Israeli professional soccer player
- Isaiah Swann (born 1985), professional basketball player
- Frank Warren, the founder of PostSecret
- Harvey D. Williams, African-American U.S. Army major general; lived in Germantown until his death in 2020
- Rei Ami, Korean-American Singer; known for providing the singing voice for the character Zoey from KPop Demon Hunters.
