= Wildwater Canoeing World Cup =

The Wildwater Canoeing World Cup is an annual series of races in wildwater canoeing held under the auspices of the International Canoe Federation. It has been held since 1989 in four canoe and kayak disciplines for men and women. The four original disciplines were men's single canoe (C1), men's double canoe (C2), men's kayak (K1) and women's kayak.

== Competition format ==
Each edition has six races to assign the cup in three events, each race has two races.

== World Cup Champions ==
=== K1 and C1 men and women; C2 men ===
Year	K1 men	K1 women	C1 men	C1 women	C2 men
1989	(France) Hervé Vitali	(Austria) Uschi Profanter	(Socialist Federal Republic of Yugoslavia) Andrej Jelenc		(Socialist Federal Republic of Yugoslavia) Srecko Masle, Andrej Grobisa
1990	(France) Yves Masson	(France) Aurore Bringard	(France) Karim Benamrouche		(France) Claude Alaphilippe, Bruno Puyfoulhoux
1991	(Germany) Markus Gickler	(Germany) Karin Wahl	(Socialist Federal Republic of Yugoslavia) Andrej Jelenc		(Socialist Federal Republic of Yugoslavia) Srecko Masle, Andrej Grobisa
1992	(France) Philippe Graille	(France) Myriam Legallo	(United States) Andy Bridge		(Slovakia) Vladimir Vala, Jaroslav Slúčik
1993	(Germany) Markus Gickler	(Austria) Uschi Profanter	(Socialist Federal Republic of Yugoslavia) Andrej Jelenc		(France) Damien Fraysse, Pierre Ross
1994	(Italy) Robert Pontarollo	(Austria) Uschi Profanter	(Italy) Vladi Panato		(Germany) Andreas Dajek, Ulrich Knittel
1995	(Italy) Robert Pontarollo	(France) Laurence Castets	(Italy) Vladi Panato		(Slovakia) Vladimir Vala, Jaroslav Slúčik
1996	(Italy) Robert Pontarollo	(Austria) Uschi Profanter	(Italy) Vladi Panato		
1997	(France) Michael Fargier	(Germany) Claudia Brokof	(Italy) Vladi Panato		(Slovakia) Jan Sutek, Stefan Grega
1998	(Italy) Robert Pontarollo	(Switzerland) Sabine Eichenberger	(Italy) Vladi Panato		(Slovakia) Vladimir Vala, Jaroslav Slúčik
1999	(Germany) Fabian Wohlers	(Switzerland) Sabine Eichenberger	(Italy) Vladi Panato		(Slovakia) Vladimir Vala, Jaroslav Slúčik
2000	(Germany) Fabian Wohlers	(Czech Republic) Michaela Strnadova	(Croatia) Tomislav Hohnjec		(Germany) Thomas Haas, Gregor Simon
2001			(Italy) Vladi Panato		
2002	(Italy) Robert Pontarollo	(Czech Republic) Michaela Strnadova	(Italy) Vladi Panato		(Croatia) Mario Pecek, Robert Raus
2003	(Czech Republic) Kamil Mrůzek	(Czech Republic) Michaela Strnadova	(Italy) Vladi Panato		(Slovakia) Vladimir Vala, Jaroslav Slucik
2004	(Czech Republic) Kamil Mrůzek	(Czech Republic) Michaela Strnadova	(Croatia) Tomislav Hohnjec (Note: Vladi Panato ended the season with 192 points as the winner, but with equal partial successes (2) he was ranked second for the lowest number of second places (2 against 3). Panato had forfeited the sixth and final race in protest, although only one point would have been enough to win his ninth world cup.)		(Slovakia) Vladimir Vala, Jaroslav Slucik
2005	(Czech Republic) Kamil Mrůzek		(Italy) Vladi Panato		(Slovakia) Leblond Cyril, David Silotto
2006		(Czech Republic) Katerina Vacikova	(Germany) Normen Weber		(Germany) Tobias Trzoska, Jannick Göbel
2007	(Italy) Maximilian Benassi	(Switzerland) Sabine Eichenberger	(Italy) Vladi Panato		(France) Cyril Leblond, Stephane Santamaria
2008	(Italy) Maximilian Benassi	(France) Nathalie Gastineau	(Germany) Normen Weber		(France) Theodore Heit, Thomase Peltriaux
2009	(Slovenia) Nejc Žnidarčič	(United Kingdom) Jessica Oughton	(Slovenia) Jošt Zakrajšek		(Germany) Maik Schmitz, Nils Knippling
2010	(Slovenia) Nejc Žnidarčič	(United Kingdom) Jessica Oughton	(Croatia) Emil Milihram		(France) Thomas Peltriaux, Theodore Heitz
2011	(France) Rémi Pété	(Switzerland) Chantal Abgottspon	(Croatia) Emil Milihram		(France) Marc Brodiez, Pierre Le Clézio
2012	(Slovenia) Nejc Žnidarčič	(Switzerland) Sabine Eichenberger	(Germany) Normen Weber	(France) Marjolaine Hecquet	(Germany) Normen Weber, Rene Brueckner
2013	(France) Paul Graton	(Germany) Manuela Stöberl	(Germany) Normen Weber	(Italy) Marlene Ricciardi	(Slovenia) Peter Žnidaršič, Luka Žganjar
2014	(Slovenia) Nejc Žnidarčič	(Switzerland) Sabine Eichenberger	(Germany) Normen Weber	(France) Marjolaine Hecquet	(Germany) Matthias Nies, Dominik Pech
2015	(Slovenia) Nejc Žnidarčič	(France) Charlène Le Corvaisier	(Germany) Normen Weber	(Germany) Sabrina Barm	(Austria) Manuel Filzwieser, Peter Draxl
2016	(France) Paul Jean	(Switzerland) Melanie Mathis	(France) Quentin Dazeur	(France) Cindy Coat	(Slovenia) Peter Žnidaršič, Luka Žganjar
2017	(Slovenia) Simon Oven	(Switzerland) Melanie Mathis	(Czech Republic) Ondřej Rolenc	(Italy) Cecilia Panato	(France) Stephane Santamaria, Quentin Dazeur
2018	(Slovenia) Simon Oven	(Switzerland) Melanie Mathis	(France) Louis Lapointe	(Italy) Cecilia Panato	(France) Louis Lapointe, Tony Debray
2019	(France) Felix Bouvet	(Italy) Mathilde Rosa	(France) Theo Viens	(Croatia) Alba Zoe Grzin	(France) Theo Viens, Etienne Klatt

=== C2 women ===
Year	C2 women
2016	(France) Cindy Coat, Haab Claire
2017	(Italy) Cecilia Panato, Alice Panato
2018	(France) Pauline Freslon, Lisa Lebouc
2019	not diputated

== See also ==
- Canoe World Cup
- Canoe Slalom World Cup
- Wildwater Canoeing World Championships
