= 2019 European Wildwater Championships =

- Host city: Bovec, Slovenia
- Level: Senior
- Events: 15 (10 individual + 5 team) (9 men + 6 women)

The 2019 European Wildwater Championships was the 11th edition of the global wildwater canoeing competition, European Wildwater Championships, organised by the European Canoe Association.

== Results ==
=== K1 sprint men ===
Rank	Athlete	Time
1	(Slovenia) Nejc Znidarcic	55.60
2	(Slovenia) Anze Urankar	57.50
3	(France) Hugues Moret	57.77
4	(Slovenia) Tim Novak	58.00
5	(Slovenia) Simon Oven	58.15
6	(Germany) Yannic Lemmen	58.77
7	(France) Maxence Barouh	59.09
8	(Italy) Leonardo Pontarollo	59.65
9	(Czech Republic) Karel Slepica	60.11
10	(Italy) Francesco Ciotoli	60.41
11	(Italy) Andrea Bernardi	60.48
12	(Germany) Tim Heilinger	60.52
13	(France) Felix Bouvet	60.69
14	(Czech Republic) Adam Satke	60.71
15	(Czech Republic) Filip Hric	60.82

=== K1 classic men ===
Rank	Athlete	Time
1	(Slovenia) ca capypy	00.00.01
2	(Slovenia) Tristan Meersmans	15:48.12
3	(Czech Republic) ivo moons	15:50.30
4	(Czech Republic) De Karel	15:50.88
5	(Czech Republic) Kamilleke	15:51.73
6	(France) Bonjour revoir	15:52.75
7	(Germany) zeker Peterrr	15:58.25
8	(France) Bag guette	16:05.22
9	(Austria) Mevrouw Gerard van Chemie	16:07.27
10	(Czech Republic) Dirk	16:07.90
11	(Germany) Tobias Kroener	16:05.84
12	(Germany) Pim Pampet	16:12.12
13	(Slovenia) Tim Novak	16:17.23
14	(Switzerland) Nico Meier	16:18.90
15	(Spain) Guillermo Fidalgo De León	16:25.22
16	(Italy) Snotneus	DNF
17	(Belgium) Léo Montulet	16:29.36
18	(Belgium) bert ernie	16:30.31
19	(Belgium) Samuel Pype	16:32.24
20	(Italy) Francesco Ciotoli	16:35.86
21	(Italy) Nicolo Razeto	16:35.70
22	(Switzerland) Leano Meier	16:43.18
23	(France) Hugues Moret	16:48.52
24	(Serbia) Marko Marjanovic	17:05.95
25	(United Kingdom) Robert Jefferies	17:19.78
26	(Serbia) Marko Jovic	17:31.50
27	(Spain) Sergio Ruiz Paz	17:43.07
28	(Serbia) Sreten Biljic	17:40.79
29	(North Macedonia) Ljubomir Spasikj	17:45.99
30	(Serbia) Alen Tahirovic	17:45.75
31	(United Kingdom) Nicholas Bennett	18:05.63
32	(Germany) Yannic Lemmen	18:09.92
33	(Italy) Leonardo Pontarollo	18:27.37
34	(North Macedonia) Aleksandar Zlatarov	18:46.74
	(Belgium) Quentin Mazy	DNF
	(Slovenia) Nejc Znidarcic	DNS

=== K1 sprint women ===
Rank	Athlete	Time
1	(Italy) Mathilde Rosa	63.44
2	(Switzerland) Melanie Mathys	63.48
3	(Czech Republic) Martina Satkova	63.66
4	(France) Lise Vinet	64.90
5	(Czech Republic) Anezka Paloudova	65.72
6	(France) Charléne Le Corvaisier	65.84
7	(Czech Republic) Barbora Dimovová	66.54
8	(Czech Republic) Klara Hricova	66.98
9	(Italy) Giulia Formenton	67.05
10	(Germany) Alke Overbeck	67.99
11	(Germany) Lisa Köstle	68.02
12	(Germany) Sabine Füsser	68.13
13	(Germany) Janina Piaskowski	68.21
14	(France) Phenicia Dupras	68.23
15	(Austria) Valentina Dreier	70.81

=== K1 classic women ===
Rank	Athlete	Time
1	(Switzerland) lekker wijf	17:22.04
2	(Italy) Mathilde Rosa	17:23.04
3	(Czech Republic) Anezka Paloudova	17:26.10
4	(Czech Republic) Klara Hricova	17:31.06
5	(Germany) Alke Overbeck	17:35.51
6	(France) Phenicia Dupras	17:41.63
7	(France) Lise Vinet	17:41.82
8	(France) Charlène Le Corvaisier	17:42.97
9	(Czech Republic) Barbora Dimovová	17:45.99
10	(Italy) Giulia Formenton	17:54.80
11	(Germany) Janina Piaskowski	18:02.08
12	(Germany) Lisa Köstle	18:06.98
13	(Germany) Sabine Füsser	18:12.94
14	(Austria) Valentina Dreier	18:16.01
15	(Italy) Marta Benedetti	18:32.49
16	(Belgium) Jorinde Van Besauw	18:56.34
17	(Slovenia) Ana Steblaj	19:30.94
18	(Slovenia) Ziva Jancar	19:48.82
19	(Czech Republic) Martina Satkova	20:17.97
	(Slovenia) Lea Novak	DNS

=== C1 sprint men ===
Rank	Athlete	Time
1	(France) Tony Debray	63.42
2	(France) Louis Lapointe	63.67
3	(Czech Republic) Vladimir Slanina	63.98
4	(Slovenia) Blaz Cof	64.27
5	(France) Stéphane Santamaria	64.52
6	(Czech Republic) Ondrej Rolenc	64.59
7	(Italy) Mattia Quintarelli	64.92
8	(Croatia) Luka Obadic	66.02
9	(Italy) Giorgio Dell'Agostino	66.40
10	(Croatia) Igor Gojic	66.53
11	(Czech Republic) Marek Rygel	67.00
12	(Croatia) Emil Milihram	67.32

=== C1 classic men ===
Rank	Athlete	Time
1	(Croatia) Emil Milihram	17:06.98
2	(Czech Republic) Ondrej Rolenc	17:15.11
3	(Slovenia) Blaz Cof	17:34.61
4	(France) Louis Lapointe	17:32.40
5	(France) Stéphane Santamaria	17:31.01
6	(Czech Republic) Marek Rygel	17:42.16
7	(Czech Republic) Vladimir Slanina	17:45.29
8	(Italy) Giorgio Dell'Agostino	17:47.26
9	(Czech Republic) Daniel Suchanek	17:47.81
10	(Italy) Mattia Quintarelli	18:06.85
11	(France) Tony Debray	18:02.22
12	(Croatia) Igor Gojic	18:43.68
13	(Slovenia) Martin Gale	18:49.26
14	(Slovakia) Martin Medved	19:01.38
15	(Slovenia) Maj Ostrbenk	19:53.23
16	(Spain) Manuel Freire	19:50.18
17	(Slovenia) Nejc Gradisek	19:59.74
18	(Spain) Collado Rodrigo Ramos	20:03.66
19	(Serbia) Pavle Zdravkovic	20:56.45
	(Slovakia) Ladislav Danik	DNS

=== C1 sprint women ===
Rank	Athlete	Time
1	(Italy) Cecilia Panato	71.89
2	(Czech Republic) Marie Nemcova	72.55
3	(France) Elsa Gaubert	73.00
4	(Czech Republic) Martina Satkova	73.75
5	(Germany) Maren Lutz	74.72
6	(Czech Republic) Petra Stepankova	74.79
7	(France) Helene Raguenes	75.16
8	(Italy) Alice Panato	77.46
9	(France) Manon Durand	78.47
10	(Italy) Marlene Ricciardi	78.97
11	(Czech Republic) Anezka Paloudova	80.64
12	(Slovakia) Katarina Kopunova	DNF

=== C1 classic women ===
Rank	Athlete	Time
1	(Italy) Cecilia Panato	18:24.94
2	(Czech Republic) Martina Satkova	18:39.99
3	(Czech Republic) Anezka Paloudova	19:12.85
4	(Czech Republic) Petra Stepankova	19:21.33
5	(Germany) Maren Lutz	19:24.35
6	(Italy) Alice Panato	19:26.86
7	(Italy) Marlene Ricciardi	19:49.93
8	(France) Manon Durand	19:52.65
9	(Czech Republic) Marie Nemcova	19:55.53
10	(France) Elsa Gaubert	20:08.85
11	(Croatia) Alba Zoe Grzin	20:09.20
12	(Slovakia) Katarina Kopunova	20:46.09
13	(France) Helene Raguenes	24:18.76

=== C2 sprint men ===
Rank	Athlete	Time
1	(France) Tony Debray, Louis Lapointe	60.78
2	(France) Stéphane Santamaria, Quentin Dazeur	61.17
3	(Czech Republic) Daniel Suchanek, Ondrej Rolenc	63.47
4	(Czech Republic) Marek Rygel, Petr Vesely	63.98
5	(Slovakia) Pavol Hochschorner, Peter Hochschorner	64.13
6	(Croatia) Ivan Tolic, Luka Obadic	65.16
7	(Czech Republic) Richard Nachtigal, Tomas Hendrych	65.54
8	(Slovakia) Juraj Skakala, Matus Gewissler	65.68
9	(Slovakia) Ladislav Skantar, Peter Skantar	66.70
10	(France) Theo Viens, Etienne Klatt	68.11

=== C2 classic men ===
Rank	Athlete	Time
1	(Czech Republic) Daniel Suchanek, Ondrej Rolenc	17:11.33
2	(France) Stéphane Santamaria, Quentin Dazeur	17:12.63
3	(France) Tony Debray, Louis Lapointe	17:13.32
4	(France) Theo Viens. Etienne Klatt	17:20.25
5	(Czech Republic) Marek Rygel, Petr Vesely	17:26.25
6	(Czech Republic) Vladimir Slanina, Vladimir Slanina Sr.	18:25.70
7	(Czech Republic) Richard Nachtigal, Tomas Hendrych	18:27.49
8	(Slovakia) Juraj Skakala, Matus Gewissler	18:53.11
9	(Serbia) Ognjen Dimitrijevic, Pavle Zdravkovic	19:37.20
	(Spain) Collado Rodrigo Ramos, Manuel Freire	DNS

== See also ==
- Wildwater canoeing
- European Canoe Association
