= 2017 European Wildwater Championships =

- Host city: Skopje, North Macedonia
- Level: Senior
- Events: 19 (12 individual + 9 team) (12 men + 9 women)

The 2017 European Wildwater Championships was the 11th edition of the global wildwater canoeing competition, European Wildwater Championships, organised by the European Canoe Association.

== Events ==
Classic

- K1 men classic
- K1 women classic
- K1 men classic teams
- K1 women classic teams

Sprint

- K1 men sprint
- K1 women sprint
- K1 men sprint teams
- K1 women sprint teams

Classic

- C1 men classic
- C1 women classic
- C1 men classic teams

Sprint

- C1 men sprint
- C1 women sprint
- C1 men sprint teams
- C1 women sprint teams

Classic

- C2 men classic
- C2 women classic
- C2 men classic teams

Sprint

- C2 men sprint
- C2 women sprint
- C2 men sprint teams

== K1 Classic ==
=== Men ===
Rank	Athlete	Country	Time
1	Nico Paufler	Germany	11:18,54
2	Simon Oven	Slovenia	11:22,34
3	Jean Paul	France	11:27,59

=== Women ===
Rank	Athlete	Country	Time
1	Klara Hricova	Czech Republic	12:31,30
2	Eef Haaze	Netherlands	12:31,75
3	Mathilde Rosa	Italy	12:40,39

=== Men team ===
Rank	Country	Athletes	Time
1	Slovenia	Nejc Znidarcic, Simon Oven, Anze Urankar	11:25,67
2	Germany	Andreas Heilinger, Nico Paufler, Finn Hartstein	11:26,21
3	France	Paul Graton, Damien Guyonnet, Jean Paul	11:34,95

=== Women team ===
Rank	Country	Athletes	Time
1	Czech Republic	Klara Hricova, Babora Bayerova, Karolina Paloudova	12:56,22
2	France	Phenicia Dupras, Claire Bren, Lise Vinet	13:17,06
3	Italy	Mathilde Rosa, Giulia Formenton, Beatrice Grasso	13:46,44

== K1 Sprint ==
=== Men ===
Rank	Athlete	Country	Time
1	Vid Debeljak	Slovenia	39,36
2	Nejc Znidarcic	Czech Republic	39,53
3	Anze Urankar	Slovenia	40,02

=== Women ===
Rank	Athlete	Country	Time
1	Bren Claire	France	44,52
2	Lisa Vinet	France	44,70
3	Melanie Mathys	Switzerland	45,30

=== Men team ===
Rank	Country	Athletes	Time
1	Slovenia	Nejc Znidarcic, Anze Urankar, Vid Debeljak	42,49
2	France	Paul Graton, Damien Guyonnet, Jean Paul	54,61
3	Czech Republic	Filip Hric, Richard Hala, Kamil Mruzek	55,11

=== Women team ===
Rank	Country	Athletes	Time
1	France	Phenicia Dupras, Claire Bren, Lise Vinet	47,98
2	Czech Republic	Eliska Capakova, Babora Bayerova, Karolina Padourova	48,84
3	Italy	Cecilia Panato, Giulia Formenton, Beatrice Grasso	49,67

== C1 Classic ==
=== Men ===
Rank	Athlete	Country	Time
1	Ondrej Rolenc	Czech Republic	12:45,26
2	Vladimir Slanina	Czech Republic	12:53,23
3	Antonin Hales	Czech Republic	12:56,82

=== Women ===
Rank	Athlete	Country	Time
1	Sabine Eichenberger	Switzerland	14:07,27
2	Cecilia Panato	Italy	14:08,85
3	Karolina Paloudova	Czech Republic	14:17,03

=== Men team ===
Rank	Country	Athletes	Time
1	Czech Republic	Ondrej Rolenc, Antonin Hales, Vladimir Slanina	12:55,69
2	Germany	Normen Weber, Tim Heilinger, Janosch Sülzer	12:59,07
3	France	Theo Viens, Quentin Dazeur, Ancelin Gourjault	13:11,78

== C1 Sprint ==
=== Men ===
Rank	Athlete	Country	Time
1	Vladimir Slanina	Czech Republic	43,94
2	Quentin Dazeur	France	43,98
3	Luka Obadic	Croatia	55,82

=== Women ===
Rank	Athlete	Country	Time
1	Marlene Ricciardi	Italy	51,90
2	Cecilia Panato	Italy	52,27
3	Cindy Coat	France	52,58

=== Men team ===
Rank	Country	Athletes	Time
1	France	Quentin Dazeur, Theo Viens, Ancelin Gourjault	46,16
2	Czech Republic	Ondrej Rolenc, Vladimir Slanina, Antonin Hales	47,27
3	Germany	Normen Weber, Tim Heilinger, Janosch Sülzer	47,82

=== Women team ===
Rank	Country	Athletes	Time
1	Czech Republic	Marie Masinova, Alexandra Plachtova, Klara Hricova	63,54
2			
3			

== C1 Classic ==
=== Men ===
Rank	Athlete	Country	Time
1	Ondrej Rolenc	Czech Republic	12:45,26
2	Vladimir Slanina	Czech Republic	12:53,23
3	Antonin Hales	Czech Republic	12:56,82

=== Women ===
Rank	Athlete	Country	Time
1	Sabine Eichenberger	Switzerland	14:07,27
2	Cecilia Panato	Italy	14:08,85
3	Karolina Paloudova	Czech Republic	14:17,03

=== Men team ===
Rank	Country	Athletes	Time
1	Czech Republic	Ondrej Rolenc, Antonin Hales, Vladimir Slanina	12:55,69
2	Germany	Normen Weber, Tim Heilinger, Janosch Sülzer	12:59,07
3	France	Theo Viens, Quentin Dazeur, Ancelin Gourjault	13:11,78

== C2 Sprint ==
=== Men ===
Rank	Athlete	Country	Time
1	Tony Debray / Louis Lapointe	France	41,88
2	Stephane Santamaria / Quentin Dazeur	France	42,52
3	Damien Mareau / Pierre Troubady	France	42,68

=== Women ===
Rank	Athlete	Country	Time
1	Alice Panato / Cecilia Panato	Italy	50,76 v
2	Cindy Coat / Manon Durand	France	51,14
3	Mathilde Rosa / Marlene Ricciardi	Italy	52,35

=== Men team ===
Rank	Country	Athletes	Time
1	France	Damien Mareau, Pierre Troubady / Louis Lapointe, Toni Debray / Stephane Santamaria, Quentin Dazeur	43,81
2	Czech Republic	Daniel Suchanek, Ondrej Rolenc / Marek Rygel, Petr Veselý / Martin Novak, Antonin Hales	46,94
3	Italy	Paolo Razzauti, Mattia Quintarelli / Giorgio Dell´Agostino, Davide Maccagnan / Riciardo Fiorese, Francesco Baldan	49,26

== See also ==
- Wildwater canoeing
- European Canoe Association
