= European Wildwater Championships =

Canoeing competition

- Genre: Wildwater canoeing
- Frequency: Biennial
- Location: Varies
- Inaugurated: 1997
- Participants: Men and women
- Organiser: European Canoe Association

The European Wildwater Championships are an international event in canoeing organized by the European Canoe Association. The European Championships take place every two year from 1997.

== Editions ==
#	Year	Venue	Nation
1	1997	La Plagne	France
2	1999	Kobarid	Slovenia
3	2001	Valsesia	Italy
4	2003	Karlovy Vary	Czech Republic
5	2005	Chalaux	France
6	2007	Bihać	Bosnia and Herzegovina
7	2009	Valtellina	Italy
8	2011	Kraljevo	Serbia
9	2013	Bovec	Slovenia
10	2015	Banja Luka	Bosnia and Herzegovina
11	2017	Skopje	North Macedonia
12	2019	Bovec	Slovenia
13	2021	Sabero	Spain
14	2023	Skopje	North Macedonia
15	2025	Mezzana	Italy

== Individual results ==
This is the list of the individual podium of the main twelve events classic and sprint (C1 and C2 men and women, K1 men and women).

=== Classic ===
==== K1 men ====
Year	1st place, gold medalist(s)	2nd place, silver medalist(s)	3rd place, bronze medalist(s)
1997	(Germany) Thomas Koelmann	(France) Philippe Graille	(Germany) Markus Gickler
1999	(Germany) Thomas Koelmann	(Germany) Florian Wohlers	(Italy) Robert Pontarollo
2001	(France) Maxime Clerin	(Germany) Florian Wohlers	(Czech Republic) Robert Knebel
2003	(Czech Republic) Kamil Mrůzek	(Czech Republic) Robert Knebel	(Italy) Robert Pontarollo
2005	(France) Arnaud Hybois	(Czech Republic) Kamil Mrůzek	(Czech Republic) Ales Marek
2007	(Germany) Max Hoff	(Italy) Maximilian Benassi	(Czech Republic) Kamil Mrůzek
2009	(France) Loïc Vynisale	(Germany) Achim Overbeck	(France) Rémi Pété
2011	(France) Rémi Pété	(Germany) Tobias Bong	(Czech Republic) Kamil Mrůzek
2013	(Germany) Tobias Bong	(Czech Republic) Kamil Mrůzek	(France) Rémi Pété
2015	(Germany) Andrea Heilinger	(Germany) Tobias Bong	(Slovenia) Nejc Žnidarčič
2017	(Germany) Nico Paufler	(Slovenia) Simon Oven	(France) Paul Jean
2019	(Slovenia) Simon Oven	(Slovenia) Anže Urankar	(Czech Republic) Adam Satke
2021	(France) Maxence Barouh	(Germany) Finn Hartstein	(France) Paul Jean
2023	(France) Maxence Barouh	(Slovenia) Simon Oven	(France) Quentin Bonnetain
2025	(Slovenia) Simon Oven	(France) Augustin Reboul	(Belgium) Léo Montulet

==== C1 men ====
Year	1st place, gold medalist(s)	2nd place, silver medalist(s)	3rd place, bronze medalist(s)
1997	(Italy) Vladi Panato	(Italy) Mirko Spelli	(Croatia) Zeljko Petric
1999	(Italy) Vladi Panato	(Slovenia) Borut Horvat	(France) Stéphane Santamaria
2001	(Croatia) Tomislav Hohnjec	(Italy) Vladi Panato	(France) Stéphane Santamaria
2003	(Germany) Stephan Stiefenhöfer	(Croatia) Emil Milihram	(Croatia) Tomislav Lepan
2005	(Germany) Stephan Stiefenhöfer	(Croatia) Emil Milihram	(Czech Republic) Lukáš Uncajtík
2007	(Croatia) Emil Milihram	(Germany) Normen Weber	(Italy) Vladi Panato
2009	(Croatia) Emil Milihram	(France) Marc Brodiez	(Slovenia) Jošt Zakrajšek
2011	(Croatia) Emil Milihram	(Germany) Normen Weber	(France) Guillaume Alzingre
2013	(Germany) Normen Weber	(Czech Republic) Ondřej Rolenc	(Slovenia) Simeon Hočevar
2015	(Croatia) Emil Milihram	(Germany) Normen Weber	(France) Stéphane Santamaria
2017	(Czech Republic) Ondřej Rolenc	(Czech Republic) Vladimir Slanina	(Czech Republic) Antonin Hales
2019	(Croatia) Emil Milihram	(Czech Republic) Ondřej Rolenc	(Slovenia) Blaž Cof
2021	(Czech Republic) Ondřej Rolenc	(Germany) Normen Weber	(Germany) Tim Heilinger
2023	(France) Theo Viens	(France) Charles Ferrion	(Germany) Normen Weber
2025	(France) Theo Viens	(France) Nicolas Sauteur	(Czech Republic) Ondřej Rolenc

==== C2 men ====
Year	1st place, gold medalist(s)	2nd place, silver medalist(s)	3rd place, bronze medalist(s)
1997	Slovakia; Vladimír Vala; Jaroslav Slúčik	Slovakia; Ján Šutek; Štefan Grega	France; Christian Derouineau; Roos Edin
1999	Slovakia; Vladimír Vala; Jaroslav Slúčik	Germany; Gregor Simon; Thomas Haas	Slovakia; Ján Šutek; Štefan Grega
2001	Slovakia; Vladimír Vala; Jaroslav Slúčik	Slovakia; Ján Šutek; Štefan Grega	Slovakia; Luboš Šoška; Peter Šoška
2003	Slovakia; Ján Šutek; Štefan Grega	Czech Republic; David Lisivký; Jan Vlček	Croatia; Mario Pecek; Robert Raus
2005	Slovakia; Ján Šutek; Štefan Grega	Slovakia; Vladimír Vala; Jaroslav Slúčik	France; Cyril Leblond; Davis Silotto
2007	France; Stephan Santamaria; Cyril Leblond	Germany; Tobias Troszka; Martin Ulrich	Slovakia; Vladimír Vala; Jaroslav Slúčik
2009	Slovakia; Vladimír Vala; Jaroslav Slúčik	Slovakia; Ján Šutek; Štefan Grega	Germany; Lukas Uncajtik; Marek Rygel
2011	Slovakia; Vladimír Vala; Jaroslav Slúčik	Germany; Rene Bruecker; Normen Weber	Germany; Maik Schmitz; Nils Knippling
2013	France; Guillaume Alzingre; Yann Claudepierre	France; Frederic Leclerc; Rémi Pété	Slovakia; Ján Šutek; Štefan Grega
2015	Germany; Matthias Nies; Dominik Pesch	France; Tony Debray; Louis Lapointe	Germany; Rene Bruecker; Normen Weber
2017	Czech Republic; Daniel Suchánek; Ondřej Rolenc	Germany; Tim Heilinger; Normen Weber	France; Stéphane Santamaria; Quentin Dazeur
2019	Czech Republic; Daniel Suchanek; Ondrej Rolenc	France; Stéphane Santamaria; Quentin Dazeur	France; Tony Debray; Louis Lapointe
2021	France; Stéphane Santamaria; Quentin Dazeur	Germany; Normen Weber; Tim Heilinger	Czech Republic; Ondřej Rolenc; Daniel Suchánek
2023	France; Theo Viens; Nicolas Sauteur	France; Manoël Roussin; Tanguy Roussin	Germany; Tim Heilinger; Normen Weber
2025	France; Theo Viens; Nicolas Sauteur	France; Manoël Roussin; Tanguy Roussin	France; Corentin Combe; Clément Monjanel

==== K1 women ====
Year	1st place, gold medalist(s)	2nd place, silver medalist(s)	3rd place, bronze medalist(s)
1997	(Switzerland) Sabine Eichenberger	(France) Anne-Blandine Crochet	(France) Anne-Fleur Sautour
1999	(France) Magali Thiébaut	(France) Anne-Blandine Crochet	(Czech Republic) Michala Strnadová
2001	(Czech Republic) Michala Strnadová	(France) Magali Thiébaut	(Switzerland) Sabine Eichenberger
2003	(Czech Republic) Michala Strnadová	(Switzerland) Sabine Eichenberger	(Switzerland) Nathalie Leclerc
2005	(Czech Republic) Michala Strnadová	(France) Nathalie Leclerc	(Germany) Alexandra Heidrich
2007	(Czech Republic) Michala Mruzková	(Czech Republic) Lenka Lagnerová	(Switzerland) Sabine Eichenberger
2009	(Germany) Sabine Füsser	(Czech Republic) Kateřina Vacíková	(Slovenia) Lučka Cankar
2011	(Switzerland) Sabine Eichenberger	(Germany) Sabine Füsser	(Germany) Manuela Stöberl
2013	(Germany) Manuela Stöberl	(France) Sixtine Malaterre	(France) Charlène Le Corvaisier
2015	(Germany) Alke Overbeck	(Germany) Manuela Stöberl	(Switzerland) Sabine Eichenberger
2017	(Czech Republic) Klára Hricová	(Netherlands) Eef Haaze	(Italy) Mathilde Rosa
2019	(Switzerland) Melanie Mathys	(Italy) Mathilde Rosa	(Czech Republic) Anežka Paloudová
2021	(Italy) Mathilde Rosa	(France) Lise Vinet	(Germany) Sophia Schmidt
2023	(France) Laurane Sinnesael	(Germany) Sophia Schmidt	(France) Lise Vinet
2025	(France) Manon Hostens	(Czech Republic) Kristina Novosadová	(Italy) Mathilde Rosa

==== C1 women ====
Year	1st place, gold medalist(s)	2nd place, silver medalist(s)	3rd place, bronze medalist(s)
2011	(Czech Republic) Hana Peterková	(France) Mylène Blondel	(Italy) Andrea Merola
2013	(France) Marjolaine Hecquet	(Italy) Marlene Ricciardi	(Czech Republic) Radka Valíková
2015	(Czech Republic) Radka Valíková	(Switzerland) Sabine Eichenberger	(Czech Republic) Anežka Paloudová
2017	(Switzerland) Sabine Eichenberger	(Italy) Cecilia Panato	(Czech Republic) Anežka Paloudová
2019	(Italy) Cecilia Panato	(Czech Republic) Martina Satková	(Czech Republic) Anezka Paloudova
2021	(Italy) Cecilia Panato	(Czech Republic) Marie Němcová	(France) Hélène Raguénès
2023	(Italy) Cecilia Panato	(France) Laura Fontaine	(Italy) Alice Panato
2025	(Italy) Cecilia Panato	(Czech Republic) Anna Retková	(France) Laura Fontaine

==== C2 women ====
Year	1st place, gold medalist(s)	2nd place, silver medalist(s)	3rd place, bronze medalist(s)
2017	Italy; Alice Panato; Cecilia Panato	Italy; Mathilde Rosa; Marlene Ricciardi	France; Cindy Coat; Manon Durand
2019	not disputed		
2021	United Kingdom; Kerry Christie; Emma Christie	United Kingdom; Laura Milne; Ellie Seed	
2023	Italy; Cecilia Panato; Alice Panato	France; Laura Fontaine; Ève Vitali-Guilbert	Czech Republic; Kristina Novosadová; Karolína Paloudová
2025	Italy; Cecilia Panato; Alice Panato	France; Elsa Gaubert; Ève Vitali-Guilbert	United Kingdom; Kerry Christie; Emma Christie

=== Sprint ===
==== K1 men ====
Year	1st place, gold medalist(s)	2nd place, silver medalist(s)	3rd place, bronze medalist(s)
2001	(France) Boris Saunier	(Germany) Florian Wohlers	(Italy) Paolo Bifano
2003	(Czech Republic) Tomáš Slovák	(Italy) Robert Pontarollo	(Germany) Florian Wohlers
2005	(France) Eric Jolit	(Germany) Florian Wohlers	(Czech Republic) Tomáš Slovák
2007	(United Kingdom) Jonathon Schofield	(Germany) Florian Wohlers	(Czech Republic) Tomáš Slovák
2009	(Slovenia) Nejc Žnidarčič	(Belgium) Maxime Richard	(Czech Republic) Aleš Marek
2011	(Italy) Jaka Jazbec	(Slovenia) Nejc Žnidarčič	(Czech Republic) Richard Hála
2013	(Slovenia) Nejc Žnidarčič	(Czech Republic) Tomáš Slovák	(France) Théo Devard
2015	(Slovenia) Nejc Žnidarčič	(Czech Republic) Richard Hála	(France) Paul Graton
2017	(Slovenia) Vid Debeljak	(Slovenia) Nejc Žnidarčič	(France) Paul Graton
2019	(Slovenia) Nejc Žnidarčič	(Slovenia) Anže Urankar	(France) Hugues Moret
2021	(Belgium) Maxime Richard	(France) Maxence Barouh	(Slovenia) Anže Urankar
2023	(Republic of Ireland) Odhrán McNally	(Slovenia) Simon Oven	(France) Quentin Bonnetain
2025	(Slovenia) Nejc Žnidarčič	(France) Augustin Reboul	(Belgium) Lean Bogaerts

==== C1 men ====
Year	1st place, gold medalist(s)	2nd place, silver medalist(s)	3rd place, bronze medalist(s)
2001	(Italy) Vladi Panato	(France) Stéphane Santamaria	(France) Harald Marzolf
2003	(France) Harald Marzolf	(Italy) Vladi Panato	(Czech Republic) Lukáš Novosad
2005	(Italy) Vladi Panato	(France) Stéphane Santamaria	(Croatia) Igor Gojič
2007	(Italy) Vladi Panato	(France) Guillaume Alzingre	(France) Yann Claudepierre
2009	(Italy) Vladi Panato	(Croatia) Emil Milihram	(France) Yann Claudepierre
2011	(Germany) Normen Weber	(Croatia) Igor Gojič	(Slovenia) Blaž Cof
2013	(France) Guillaume Alzingre	(Slovenia) Blaž Cof	(Czech Republic) Ondřej Rolenc
2015	(Croatia) Normen Weber	(Czech Republic) Ondřej Rolenc	(France) Quentin Dazeur
2017	(Czech Republic) Vladimír Slanina	(France) Quentin Dazeur	(Croatia) Luka Obadic
2019	(France) Tony Debray	(France) Louis Lapointe	(Czech Republic) Vladimír Slanina
2021	(France) Quentin Dazeur	(Czech Republic) Ondřej Rolenc	(Czech Republic) Matěj Vaněk
2023	(Slovakia) Matej Beňuš	(Serbia) Pavle Zdravković	(Czech Republic) Matouš Beier
2025	(France) Charles Ferrion	(France) Nicolas Sauteur	(Czech Republic) Ondřej Rolenc

==== C2 men ====
Year	1st place, gold medalist(s)	2nd place, silver medalist(s)	3rd place, bronze medalist(s)
2001	Slovakia; Luboš Šoška; Peter Šoška	Slovakia; Ján Šutek; Štefan Grega	Croatia; Mario Pecek; Robert Raus
2003	Slovakia; Ján Šutek; Štefan Grega	Czech Republic; David Lisický; Jan Vlček	Croatia; Mario Pecek; Robert Raus
2005	France; Michael Didier; Frederic Momot	Slovakia; Ján Šutek; Štefan Grega	France; Cyril Leblond; David Silotto
2007	France; Stéphane Santamaria; Cyril Leblond	France; Michael Didier; Frederic Momot	France; Pascal Reyes; Olivier Pourteyron
2009	Slovakia; Matúš Kunhart; Peter Šoška	France; Mathieu Blondeau; Fabrice Bethune	Czech Republic; Lukáš Ujcajtik; Marek Rygel
2011	Czech Republic; Michal Šrámek; Lukáš Tomek	France; Tom bar Michel Cordier	Slovakia; Matúš Kunhart; Peter Šoška
2013	France; Guillaume Alzingre; Yann Claudepierre	France; Damien Guyonnet; Gaetan Guyonnet	France; Frederic Leclerc; Rémi Pété
2015	Slovenia; Simon Hočevar; Blaž Cof	France; Tony Debrax; Louis Lapointe	Slovenia; Luka Zganjar; Peter Znidaršič
2017	France; Tony Debrax; Louis Lapointe	France; Stéphane Santamaria; Quentin Dazeur	France; Damien Mareau; Pierre Troubady
2019	France; Tony Debray; Louis Lapointe	France; Stéphane Santamaria; Quentin Dazeur	Czech Republic; Daniel Suchánek; Ondřej Rolenc
2021	France; Stéphane Santamaria; Quentin Dazeur	France; Pierre Troubady; Hugues Moret	Germany; Normen Weber; Tim Heilinger
2023	France; Pierre Troubady; Hugues Moret	France; Manoël Roussin; Tanguy Roussin	Czech Republic; Matouš Beier; Matěj Vaněk
2025	France; Corentin Combe; Clément Monjanel	France; Manoël Roussin; Tanguy Roussin	France; Nicolas Sauteur; Theo Viens

==== K1 women ====
Year	1st place, gold medalist(s)	2nd place, silver medalist(s)	3rd place, bronze medalist(s)
2001	(France) Magali Thiébaut	(Austria) Ursula Profanter	(France) Anne-Blandine Crochet
2003	(Czech Republic) Michala Strnadová	(France) Nathalie Gastineau	(Switzerland) Sabine Eichenberger
2005	(Czech Republic) Michala Strnadová	(France) Nathalie Leclerc	(Germany) Sabine Füsser
2007	(Czech Republic) Michala Strnadová	(Czech Republic) Kateřina Vacíková	(United Kingdom) Jessica Oughton
2009	(Germany) Sabine Füsser	(United Kingdom) Sandra Hyslop	(United Kingdom) Jessica Oughton
2011	(France) Laëtitia Parage	(Switzerland) Chantal Abgottspon	(Germany) Alke Overbeck
2013	(France) Sixtine Malaterre	(France) Charlène Le Corvaisier	(France) Manon Hostens
2015	(Italy) Costanza Bonaccorsi	(France) Manon Hostens	(Switzerland) Chantal Abgottspon
2017	(France) Claire Bren	(France) Lise Vinet	(Switzerland) Melanie Mathys
2019	(Italy) Mathilde Rosa	(Switzerland) Melanie Mathys	(Czech Republic) Martina Satková
2021	(France) Pauline Freslon	(Czech Republic) Barbora Dimovová	(France) Lise Vinet
2023	(France) Lisa Lebouc	(Czech Republic) Klára Vaňková	(Italy) Mathilde Rosa
2025	(France) Laura Fontaine	(Italy) Cecilia Panato	(France) Manon Hostens

==== C1 women ====
Year	1st place, gold medalist(s)	2nd place, silver medalist(s)	3rd place, bronze medalist(s)
2011	(Czech Republic) Hana Peterková	(France) Mylène Blondel	(Italy) Andrea Merola
2013	(France) Julie Paoletti	(Czech Republic) Radka Valíková	(Italy) Marlene Ricciardi
2015	(France) Claire Haab	(Italy) Valentina Razzauti	(Czech Republic) Radka Valíková
2017	(Italy) Marlene Ricciardi	(Italy) Cecilia Panato	(France) Cindy Coat
2019	(Italy) Cecilia Panato	(Czech Republic) Marie Němcová	(France) Elsa Gaubert
2021	(France) Elsa Gaubert	(Italy) Cecilia Panato	(France) Hélène Raguénès
2023	(Czech Republic) Zuzana Dziadková	(Slovakia) Katarína Kopúnová	(France) Margot Béziat
2025	(Italy) Cecilia Panato	(Czech Republic) Anna Retková	(France) Elsa Gaubert

==== C2 women ====
Year	1st place, gold medalist(s)	2nd place, silver medalist(s)	3rd place, bronze medalist(s)
2017	Italy; Alice Panato; Cecilia Panato	France; Cindy Coat; Manon Durand	Italy; Mathilde Rosa; Marlene Ricciardi
2019	not disputed		
2021	France; Elsa Gaubert; Hélène Raguénès	United Kingdom; Laura Milne; Ellie Seed	United Kingdom; Kerry Christie; Emma Christie
2023	France; Margot Béziat; Elsa Gaubert	Italy; Cecilia Panato; Alice Panato	Czech Republic; Kristina Novosadová; Karolína Paloudová
2025	Italy; Cecilia Panato; Alice Panato	Slovakia; Katarína Kopúnová; Petra Šošková	France; Elsa Gaubert; Ève Vitali-Guilbert

== See also ==
- Wildwater canoeing
- European Canoe Slalom Championships
- Wildwater World Championships
