= 2006 Wildwater Canoeing World Championships =

- Host city: Karlovy Vary, Czech Republic
- Level: Senior
- Events: 12

The 2006 Wildwater Canoeing World Championships was the 25th edition of the global wildwater canoeing competition, Wildwater Canoeing World Championships, organised by the International Canoe Federation.

== Podiums ==
=== Classic ===
==== K1 ====
Men
Rank	Athlete	Country	Time
1st place, gold medalist(s)	Kamil Mruzek	Czech Republic	
2nd place, silver medalist(s)	Max Hoff	Germany	
3rd place, bronze medalist(s)	Tomas Slovak	Czech Republic	

Women
Rank	Athlete	Country	Time
1st place, gold medalist(s)	Michala Strnadova	Czech Republic	
2nd place, silver medalist(s)	Alexandra Heidrick	Germany	
3rd place, bronze medalist(s)	Sabine Eichenberger	Switzerland	

Men team
Rank	Athlete	Country	Time
1st place, gold medalist(s)	Kamil Mruzek; Tomas Slovak; Ales Marek	Czech Republic	
2nd place, silver medalist(s)	Maximilian Benassi; Carlo Mercati; Francesco Arenare	Italy	
3rd place, bronze medalist(s)	Max Hoff; Gemot Willscheid; Sebastian Verhoef	Germany	

Women team
Rank	Athlete	Country	Time
1st place, gold medalist(s)	Michala Mruzkova; Lenka Lagnerova; Katerina Vacikova	Czech Republic	
2nd place, silver medalist(s)	Alexandra Heidrich; Sabine Füsser; Alke Overbeck	Germany	
3rd place, bronze medalist(s)	Helgard Marzolf; Laëtitia Parage; Nathalie Gastineau	France	

==== C1 ====
Men
Rank	Athlete	Country	Time
1st place, gold medalist(s)	Emil Milihram	Croatia	
2nd place, silver medalist(s)	Stephan Stiefenhöfer	Germany	
3rd place, bronze medalist(s)	Vladi Panato	Italy	

Men team
Rank	Athlete	Country	Time
1st place, gold medalist(s)	Stephan Stiefenhöfer; Normen Werber; Julian Rohn	Germany	
2nd place, silver medalist(s)	Lukas Uncajtik; Marek Rygel; Jan Neset	Czech Republic	
3rd place, bronze medalist(s)	Tomislav Lepan; Igor Gojic; Emil Milihram	Croatia	

==== C2 ====
Men
Rank	Athlete	Country	Time
1st place, gold medalist(s)	Ulich Andree; Patrick Dresch	Germany	
2nd place, silver medalist(s)	David Lisicky; Jan Vlcek	Czech Republic	
3rd place, bronze medalist(s)	Tobias Trozska; Janik Gobel	Germany	

Men team
Rank	Athlete	Country	Time
1st place, gold medalist(s)	Vladimir Vala / Jaroslav Slucik; Grega / Sutek; Soska L. / Soska P.	Slovakia	
2nd place, silver medalist(s)	Reyes / Pourteyon; Leblond / Silotto; Momot / Didier	France	
3rd place, bronze medalist(s)	Andree / Driesch; Troszka / Gobel; Fahlbusch L./ Fahlbusch U.	Germany	

=== Sprint ===
==== K1 ====
Men
Rank	Athlete	Country	Time
1st place, gold medalist(s)	Max Hoff	Germany	
2nd place, silver medalist(s)	Arnaud Hybois	France	
3rd place, bronze medalist(s)	Tomas Slovak	Czech Republic	

Women
Rank	Athlete	Country	Time
1st place, gold medalist(s)	Michala Strnadova	Czech Republic	
2nd place, silver medalist(s)	Nathalie Gastineau	France	
3rd place, bronze medalist(s)	Helgard Marzolf	France	

==== C1 ====
Men
Rank	Athlete	Country	Time
1st place, gold medalist(s)	Guillaume Alzingre	France	
2nd place, silver medalist(s)	Stéphane Santamaria	France	
3rd place, bronze medalist(s)	Stephan Stiefenhöfer	Germany	

==== C2 ====
Men
Rank	Athlete	Country	Time
1st place, gold medalist(s)	David Silotto; Cyril Leblond	France	
2nd place, silver medalist(s)	David Lisicky; Jan Vlcek	Czech Republic	
3rd place, bronze medalist(s)	Frédéric Momot; Michael Didier	France	

== Medal table ==
Rank	Country	1st place, gold medalist(s)	2nd place, silver medalist(s)	3rd place, bronze medalist(s)	Tot.
1	Czech Republic	5	3	2	10
2	Germany	3	4	4	11
3	France	2	3	3	8
4	Croatia	1	0	1	2
5	Slovakia	1	0	0	1
6	Italy	0	2	1	3
7	Switzerland	0	0	1	1
Total		12	12	12	36

== See also ==
- Wildwater canoeing
