= 2004 Wildwater Canoeing World Championships =

- Host city: Garmisch-Partenkirchen, Italy
- Level: Senior
- Events: 12

The 2004 Wildwater Canoeing World Championships was the 24th edition of the global wildwater canoeing competition, Wildwater Canoeing World Championships, organised by the International Canoe Federation.

== Podiums ==
=== Classic ===
==== K1 ====
Men
Rank	Athlete	Country	Time
1st place, gold medalist(s)	Carlo Mercati	Italy	
2nd place, silver medalist(s)	Robert Knebel	Czech Republic	
3rd place, bronze medalist(s)	Robert Pontarollo	Italy	

Women
Rank	Athlete	Country	Time
1st place, gold medalist(s)	Sabine Eichenberger	Switzerland	
2nd place, silver medalist(s)	Anne Blandine Crochet	France	
3rd place, bronze medalist(s)	Sabine Füsser	Germany	

Men team
Rank	Athlete	Country	Time
1st place, gold medalist(s)	Robert Knebel; Kamil Mruzek; David Knebel	Czech Republic	
2nd place, silver medalist(s)	Arnaud Hybois; Ronan Tastard; Maxim Clerin	France	
3rd place, bronze medalist(s)	Robert Pontarollo; Carlo Mercati; Francesco Arenare	Italy	

==== C1 ====
Men
Rank	Athlete	Country	Time
1st place, gold medalist(s)	Tomislav Hohnjec	Croatia	
2nd place, silver medalist(s)	Vladi Panato	Italy	
3rd place, bronze medalist(s)	Stephan Stiefenhöfer	Germany	

Men team
Rank	Athlete	Country	Time
1st place, gold medalist(s)	Tomislav Hohnjec; Tomislav Lepan; Igor Gojic	Croatia	
2nd place, silver medalist(s)	Harald Marzolof; Stéphane Santamaria; Guillaume Alzingre	France	
3rd place, bronze medalist(s)	Stephan Stiefenhöfer; Olaf Schwarz; Julian Rohn	Germany	

==== C2 ====
Men
Rank	Athlete	Country	Time
1st place, gold medalist(s)	Vladimir Vala; Jaroslav Slucik	Slovakia	
2nd place, silver medalist(s)	Jan Sutek; Stefan Grega	Slovakia	
3rd place, bronze medalist(s)	Gregor Simon; Thomas Haas	Germany	

=== Sprint ===
==== K1 ====
Men
Rank	Athlete	Country	Time
1st place, gold medalist(s)	Arnaud Hybois	France	
2nd place, silver medalist(s)	Robert Pontarollo	Italy	
3rd place, bronze medalist(s)	Tomas Slovak	Czech Republic	

Women
Rank	Athlete	Country	Time
1st place, gold medalist(s)	Anne Blandine Crochet	France	
2nd place, silver medalist(s)	Sabine Füsser	Germany	
3rd place, bronze medalist(s)	Nathalie Gastineau	France	

==== C1 ====
Men
Rank	Athlete	Country	Time
1st place, gold medalist(s)	Harald Marzolf	France	
2nd place, silver medalist(s)	Vladi Panato	Italy	
3rd place, bronze medalist(s)	Stephan Stiefenhöfer	Germany	

==== C2 ====
Men
Rank	Athlete	Country	Time
1st place, gold medalist(s)	Vladimir Vala; Jaroslav Slucik	Slovakia	
2nd place, silver medalist(s)	Cyril Leblond; David Silotto	France	
3rd place, bronze medalist(s)	Lubos Soska; Peter Soska	Slovakia	

== Medal table ==
Rank	Country	1st place, gold medalist(s)	2nd place, silver medalist(s)	3rd place, bronze medalist(s)	Tot.
1	France	3	4	1	8
2	Slovakia	2	1	1	4
3	Croatia	2	0	0	2
4	Italy	1	3	2	6
5	Czech Republic	1	1	1	3
6	Switzerland	1	0	0	1
7	Germany	0	1	5	6
Total		10	10	10	30

== See also ==
- Wildwater canoeing
