= 2015 Wildwater Canoeing World Championships =

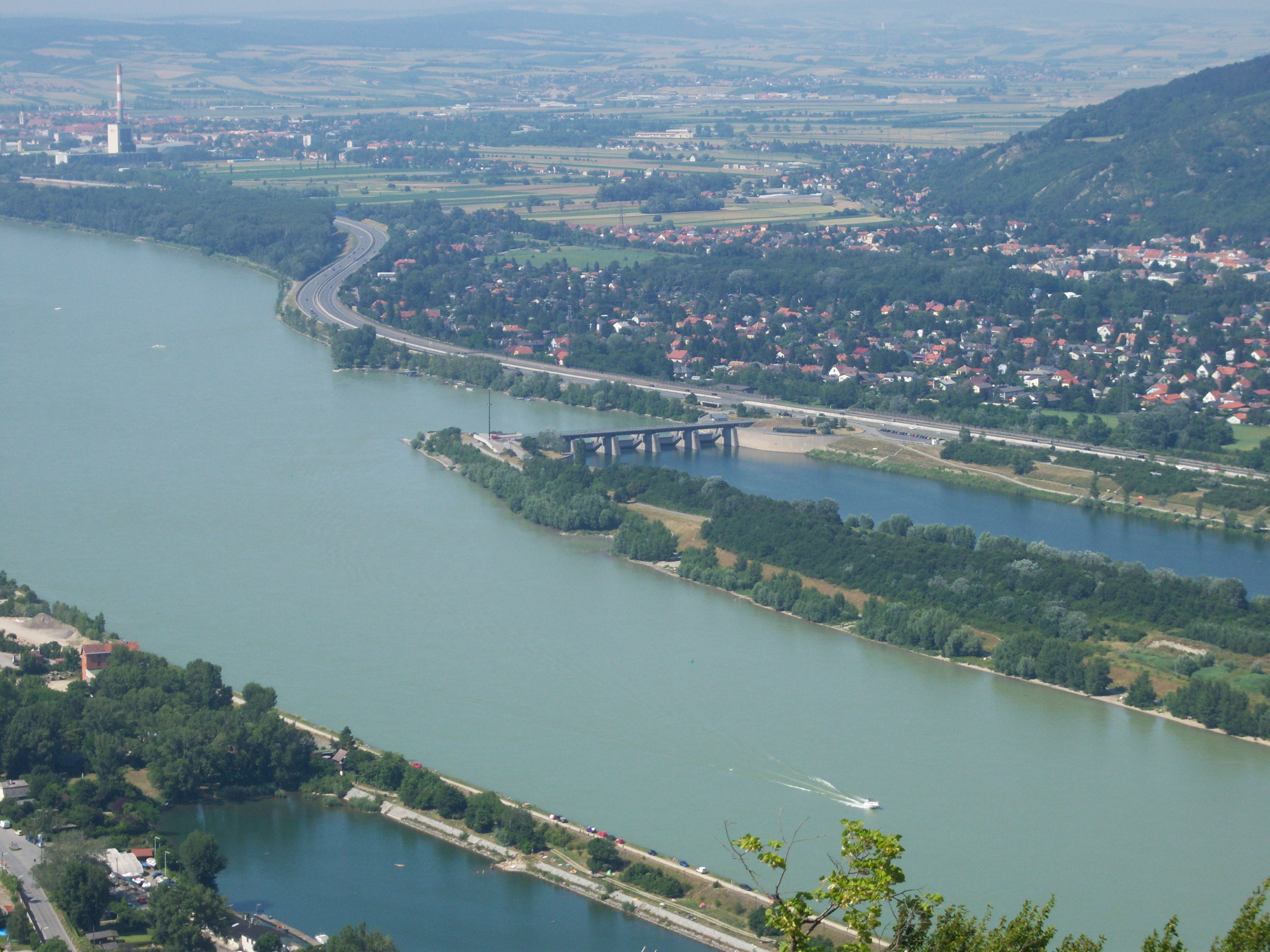
- The Donauinsel in Vienna, part of the Vienna Watersports Arena.
- Host city: Vienna; Austria
- Venue: Vienna Watersports Arena
- Level: Senior
- Events: 30

The 2015 Wildwater Canoeing World Championships was the 32nd edition of the global wildwater canoeing competition, Wildwater Canoeing World Championships, organised by the International Canoe Federation.

== Results ==
=== Men ===
==== Kajak ====
Event	Gold	Time	Silver	Time	Bronze	Time
K-1	(France) Paul Graton	40,00	(Slovenia) Nejc Znidarcic	40,31	(Slovenia) Vid Debeljak	40,83
K-1 Team	France; Gaetan Guyonnet; Paul Graton; Clement Faure	43,66	Slovenia; Tim Kolar; Vid Debeljak; Nejc Znidarcic	43,77	Czech Republic; Jan Olejnik; Tomáš Slovák; Richard Hala	45,08

==== Canadian ====
Event	Gold	Time	Silver	Time	Bronze	Time
C-1	(France) Guillaume Alzingre	41,90	(Germany) Normen Weber	42,85	(Italy) Mattia Quintarelli	43,99
C-1 Team	France; Quentin Dazeur; Guilaume Alzingre; Antoine Demateis	46,47	Germany; Dominik Pesch; Tim Heilinger; Normen Weber	47,13	Italy; Mattia Quintarelli; Vladi Panato; Giorgio Dell'Agostino	48,13
C-2	France; Damien Mareau; Pierre Troubady	42,77	Slovenia; Luka Zganjar; Peter Znidarsic	43,24	Slovenia; Simeaon Hocevar; Blaz Cof	43,84
C-2 Team	France; Tony Debray; Louis Lapointe; Damien Mareau; Pierre Troubady; Quentin Dazeur; Gaitan Guyonnet	47,28	Czech Republic; Ondrej Rolenc; Jan Stastny; Marek Rygel; Petr Vesely; Michael Sramek; Lukas Tomek	47,98	Slovenia; Simeon Hocevar; Maks Franceskin; Blaz Cof; Nejc Znidarcic; Luka Zganjar; Peer Znidarsic	48,45

=== Women ===
==== Kajak ====
Event	Gold	Time	Silver	Time	Bronze	Time
K-1	(Italy) Costanza Bonaccorsi	44,34	(Czech Republic) Anezka Paloudova	45,45	(Czech Republic) Martina Satkova	46,84
K-1 Team	France; Claire Bren; Manon Hostens; Marion Leriche	50,18	Czech Republic; Anezka Paloudova; Martina Satkova; Klara Padourova	51,52	Italy; Costanza Bonaccorsi; Beatrice Grasso; Mathilde Rosa	52,27

==== Canadian ====
Event	Gold	Time	Silver	Time	Bronze	Time
C-1	(France) Claire Haab	51,48	(Czech Republic) Martina Satkova	52,11	(Italy) Marlene Ricciardi	52,23

== See also ==
- Wildwater canoeing
