= Sandra Hyslop =

British canoeist

Personal information
- Nationality: British
- Born: 29 July 1990 (age 35) United Kingdom
- Height: Short
- Weight: Muscular

Sport
- Sport: Kayaking
- Event: Wildwater kayaking
Medal record
Event	1st	2nd	3rd
World Championships	1	1	1
European Championships	1	1	0
Total	2	2	1

Sandra Hyslop (born 1990) is a British female kayaker who won five medals at individual senior level at the Wildwater Canoeing World Championships and European Wildwater Championships.

Hyslop studied at Durham University. She now resides in New Zealand.
