= Tim Novak =

Slovenian canoeist

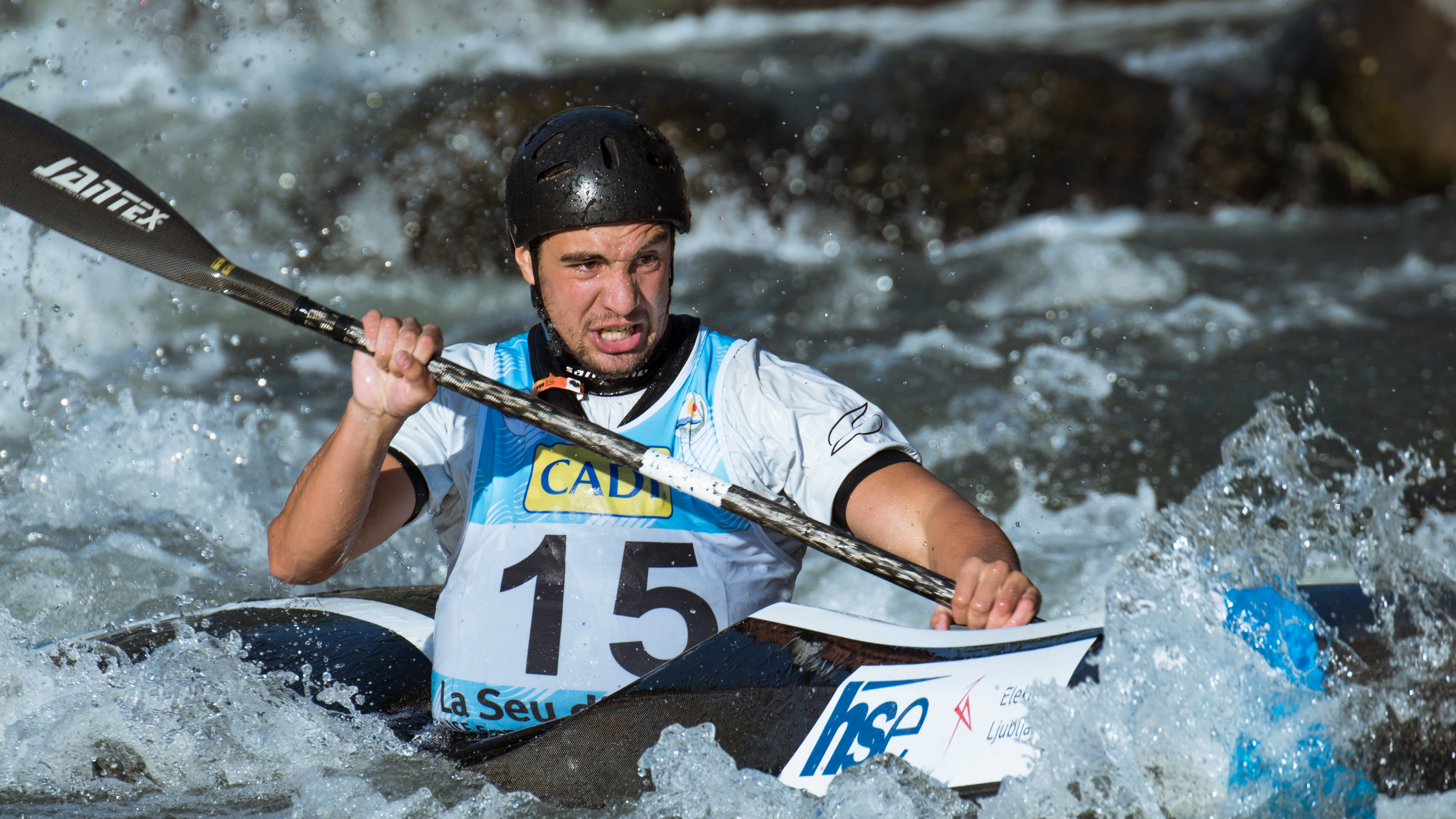
- Novak in 2019

Personal information
- Nationality: Slovenian
- Born: 21 August 1997 (age 28) Slovenia

Sport
- Sport: Canoeing
- Event: Wildwater canoeing
Medal record
Event	1st	2nd	3rd
European Championships	0	1	0

Tim Novak (born 21 August 1997) is a Slovenian male canoeist who won a silver medal at senior level at the European Wildwater Championships.
