= Andrea Merola =

Italian canoeist

Personal information
- Nationality: Italian
- Born: 1988 (age 37–38) La Spezia, Italy

Sport
- Sport: Canoeing
- Event: Wildwater canoeing
- Club: G.S. Marina Militare; CUS Pavia
Medal record
Event	1st	2nd	3rd
World Championships	0	0	1
European Championships	0	0	2
Total	0	0	3

Andrea Merola (born 1988) is an Italian female canoeist who won three medals at senior level of the Wildwater Canoeing World Championships and European Wildwater Championships.
