= Mylène Blondel =

French canoeist

Personal information
- Nationality: French
- Born: 29 December 1992 (age 33) France

Sport
- Sport: Canoeing
- Event: Wildwater canoeing
- Club: Bruche sport passion Molsheim
Medal record
Event	1st	2nd	3rd
European Championships	0	2	0

Mylène Blondel (born 29 December 1992) is a French female canoeist who won five medals at senior level of the European Wildwater Championships.
