= Magali Thiébaut =

French canoeist

Personal information
- Nationality: French
- Born: 15 May 1976 (age 50) France

Sport
- Sport: Canoeing
- Event: Wildwater canoeing
Medal record
Individual
Event	1st	2nd	3rd
World Championships	3	1	0
European Championships	5	2	0
Total	8	3	0

Magali Thiébaut (born 11 May 1976) is a French female canoeist who won eleven medals at individual senior level of the Wildwater Canoeing World Championships and European Wildwater Championships.
