= Abgottspon =

Abgottspon is a surname. Notable people with the surname include:

- Céline Abgottspon (born 1995), Swiss ice hockey player
- Chantal Abgottspon (born 1990), Swiss canoeist
