= Lučka Cankar =

Slovenian canoeist (born 1972)

Personal information
- Nationality: Slovenian
- Born: 26 October 1972 (age 53) Celje, Slovenia

Sport
- Sport: Canoeing
- Event: Wildwater canoeing
Medal record
Event	1st	2nd	3rd
World Championships	0	1	0
European Championships	0	0	2
Total	0	1	2

Lučka Coat (born 26 October 1972) is a Slovenian female canoeist who won three medals at individual senior level at the Wildwater Canoeing World Championships and European Wildwater Championships.
