= Hana Peterková =

Czech canoeist

Personal information
- Nationality: Czech
- Born: 19 February 1987 (age 39) Czech Republic
- Height: 1.71 m (5 ft 7 in)
- Weight: 75 kg (165 lb)

Sport
- Sport: Canoeing
- Event: Wildwater canoeing
Medal record
Event	1st	2nd	3rd
World Championships	0	1	1
European Championships	2	0	0
Total	2	1	1

Hana Peterková (born 19 February 1987) is a Czech female canoeist who won four medals at senior level of the Wildwater Canoeing World Championships and European Wildwater Championships.
