= Helgard Marzolf =

French canoeist

Personal information
- Nationality: French
- Born: 19 November 1983 (age 42) France

Sport
- Sport: Canoeing
- Event: Wildwater canoeing
Medal record
| Event | 1st | 2nd | 3rd |
|---|---|---|---|
| World Championships | 2 | 0 | 2 |
| European Championships | 0 | 0 | 2 |
| Total | 2 | 0 | 4 |

Helgard Marzolf (born 19 November 1983) is a French female canoeist who won six medals at individual senior level at the Wildwater Canoeing World Championships and European Wildwater Championships.

She is the sister of the other canoeist Harald Marzolf.
