= Radka Valíková =

Czech canoeist

Personal information
- Nationality: Czech
- Born: 13 March 1991 (age 35) Czech Republic

Sport
- Sport: Canoeing
- Event: Wildwater canoeing
Medal record
Event	1st	2nd	3rd
World Championships	1	0	2
European Championships	1	3	4
Total	2	3	6

Radka Valíková (born 13 March 1991) is a Czech female canoeist who won eleven medals at individual senior level of the Wildwater Canoeing World Championships and European Wildwater Championships.
