= Florian Wohlers =

German canoeist

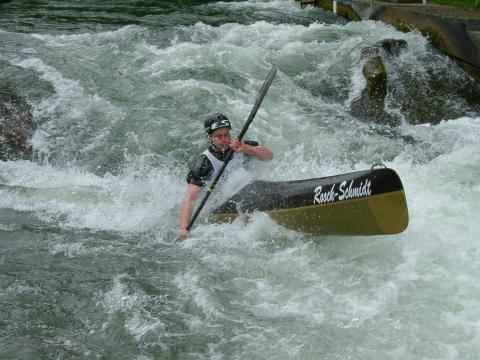
- Wohlers in 2003

Personal information
- Nationality: German
- Born: 1976 (age 49–50) Germany

Sport
- Sport: Canoeing
- Event(s): Hamburg, Wildwater canoeing
- Club: WSF Süderelbe
Medal record
Event	1st	2nd	3rd
World Championships	0	3	1
European Championships	3	5	2
Total	3	8	3

Florian Wohlers (born 1976) is a former German male canoeist who won 14 medals at individual senior level at the Wildwater Canoeing World Championships and European Wildwater Championships.
