= Vladi Panato =

Italian canoeist (born 1972)

Personal information
- Full name: Vladi Carlo Panato
- Nickname: Il Mito (The Mith)
- Nationality: Italian
- Born: 28 October 1972 (age 53) Bussolengo, Italy

Sport
- Sport: Canoeing
- Event: Wildwater canoeing
- Club: Canoa Club Pescantina
- Coached by: Alviano Mesaroli
Medal record
Event	1st	2nd	3rd
World Championships	9	3	3
European Championships	5	2	1
Total	14	5	4

Vladi Panato (born 28 October 1972) is an Italian male canoeist who won 15 medals at senior level at the Wildwater Canoeing World Championships.

The myth has won 11 world cups making it the canoeist with the highest record of victories, six in a row from 1994 to 1999, then from 2001 to 2003, 2005 and in 2007 the eleventh and last one.

== Biography ==
His two daughters Cecilia and Alice are also canoeists. From 2017 he is also the technical director of the Italy national wildwater canoeing team, having taken over the role of another Italian canoeing legend, Robert Pontarollo.

In 2004 Vladi Panato ended the World Cup season with 192 points as the winner, but with equal partial successes (2) he was ranked second for the lowest number of second places (2 against 3). Panato had forfeited the sixth and final race in protest, although only one point would have been enough to win his ninth world cup. The winner was Tomislav Hohnjec.

== Medals at the World Championships ==
Senior

Year	1st place, gold medalist(s)	2nd place, silver medalist(s)	3rd place, bronze medalist(s)
1993	1	0	0
1995	1	0	0
1996	2	0	0
1998	1	0	0
2000	1	0	0
2002	2	1	0
2004	0	2	0
2008	1	0	0
2015	0	0	1
2017	0	0	1
2018	0	0	1
Total	9	3	3

== World Cup results ==
Panato won eleven editions of the Wildwater Canoeing World Cup in C1 classic.

Season	
Season	Discipline
1994	C1 classic
1995	C1 classic
1996	C1 classic
1997	C1 classic
1998	C1 classic
1999	C1 classic
2001	C1 classic
2002	C1 classic
2003	C1 classic
2004	C1 classic
2007	C1 classic
