= Hric =

Hric (Slovak pronunciation: [ɦrit͡s]) is a surname of Slovak origin. Its feminine counterpart is Hricová. Notable people with the surname include:

- Erik Hric (born 1997), Slovak footballer
- Filip Hric (born 1993), Czech canoeist
- Klára Hricová (born 1999), Czech canoeist
- Pavol Hric (born 1976), Slovak canoeist
- Peter Hric (1965–2025), Slovak cyclist

== See also ==
- Human Rights in China (HRIC), US-based human rights organization
