= Anne-Fleur Sautour =

French canoeist

Personal information
- Nationality: French
- Born: 2 February 1975 (age 51) France

Sport
- Sport: Canoeing
- Event: Wildwater canoeing
Medal record
Event	1st	2nd	3rd
World Championships	2	1	0
European Championships	1	0	1
Total	3	1	1

Anne-Fleur Sautour (born 2 February 1975) is a French female canoeist who won five medals at individual senior level at the Wildwater Canoeing World Championships and European Wildwater Championships.
