= Paul Jean =

French canoeist

Personal information
- Nationality: French
- Born: 21 May 1995 (age 31) France

Sport
- Sport: Canoeing
- Event: Wildwater canoeing

Paul Jean (born 21 May 1995) is a French male canoeist who won medals at senior level at the Wildwater Canoeing World Championships.

He won two editions of the Wildwater Canoeing World Cup in K1.
