= Anežka Paloudová =

Czech canoeist

Anežka Dostálová
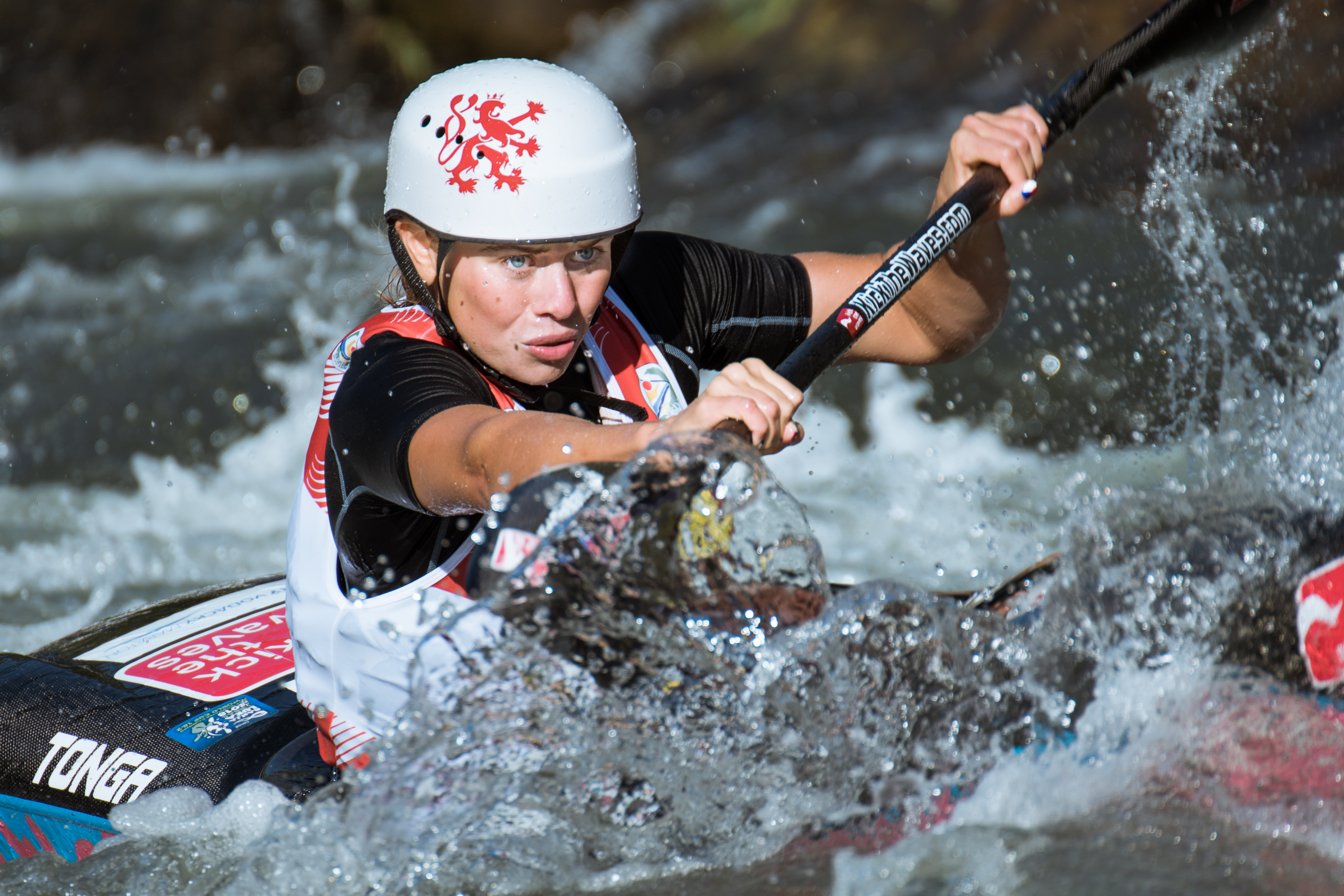
- Paloudova in 2019

Personal information
- Born: Anežka Paloudová; 19 January 1999 (age 27) Prague, Czech Republic
- Home town: Český Krumlov, Czech Republic
- Height: 172 cm (5 ft 8 in)
- Weight: 65 kg (143 lb)
- Spouse: Josef Dostál (m. 2026)

Sport
- Country: Czech Republic
- Sport: Canoeing
- Events: Wildwater canoeing, flatwater canoeing
- Club: SK Vltava Český Krumlov, USK Praha
- Coached by: Hana Krpatová
Medal record
Event	1st	2nd	3rd
World Championships	6	3	1
European Championships	3	2	4
Total	9	5	5

Anežka Dostálová (née Paloudová, born 19 January 1999) is a Czech female canoeist who won 19 medals at senior level at the Wildwater Canoeing World Championships and European Wildwater Championships.

== Personal life ==
She married Czech canoeist Josef Dostál in 2026.

== Medals at the World Championships ==
Senior

Year	1st place, gold medalist(s)	2nd place, silver medalist(s)	3rd place, bronze medalist(s)
2015	0	1	0
2016	2	0	1
2017	1	0	0
2018	2	0	0
2019	1	2	0
