= Manuela Stöberl =

German canoeist

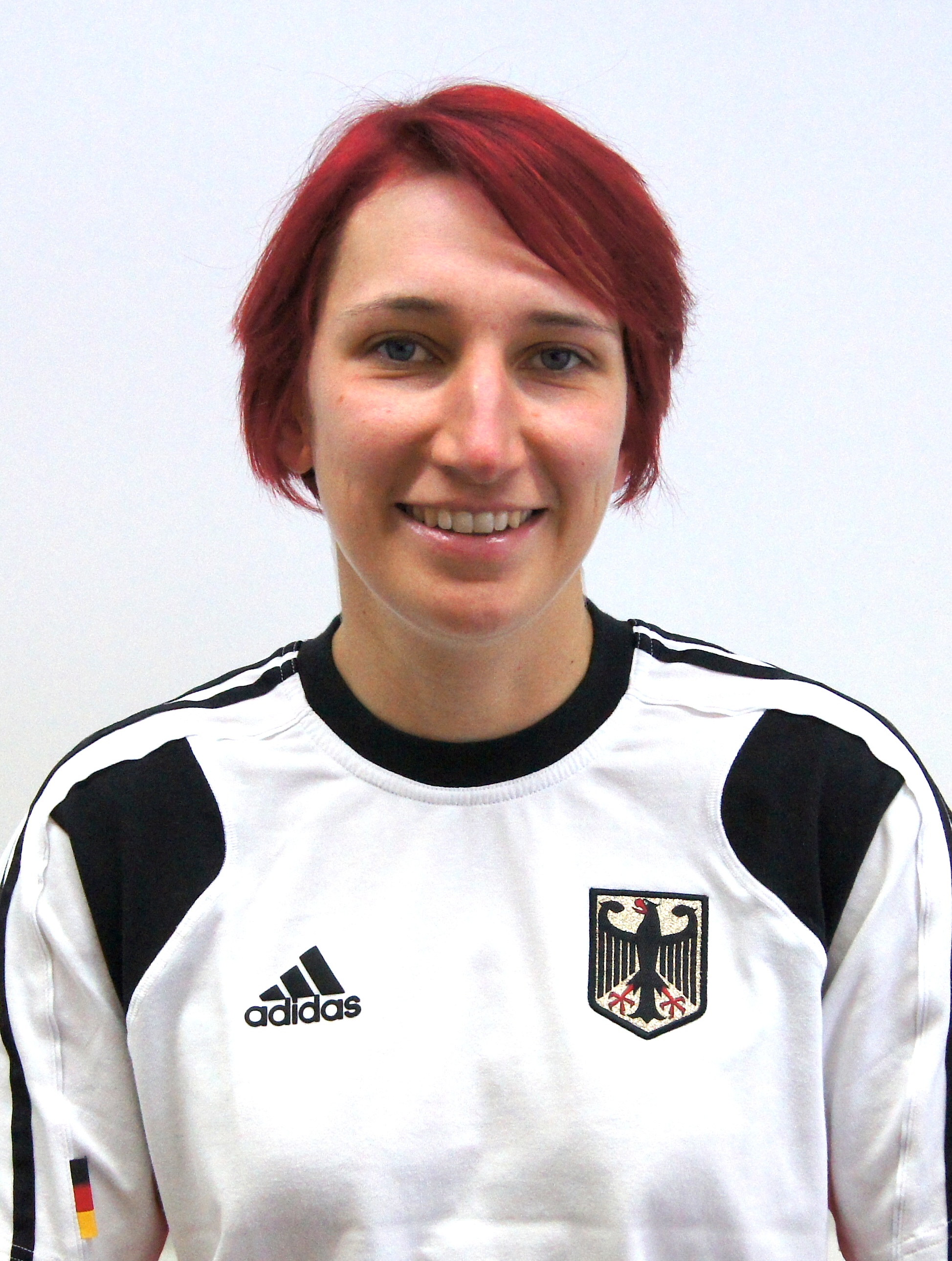

Personal information
- Nationality: German
- Born: 12 July 1980 (age 45) Donauwörth, Germany

Sport
- Sport: Canoeing
- Event: Wildwater canoeing
- Club: Kajak-Klub Rosenheim
Medal record
Event	1st	2nd	3rd
World Championships	3	4	3
European Championships	4	4	2
Total	7	8	5

Manuela Stöberl (born 12 July 1980) is a German female canoeist who won 20 medals at senior level at the Wildwater Canoeing World Championships and European Wildwater Championships.
