= Rémi Pété =

French canoeist

Personal information
- Nationality: French
- Born: 21 September 1987 (age 38) France

Sport
- Sport: Canoeing
- Event: Wildwater canoeing

Rémi Pété (born 21 September 1987) is a French male canoeist who won medals at senior level at the Wildwater Canoeing World Championships.

He won a Wildwater Canoeing World Cup in K1.
