= Alexandra Heidrich =

German canoeist

Personal information
- Nationality: German
- Born: 21.04.1979 Germany

Sport
- Sport: Canoeing
- Event: Wildwater canoeing
- Club: STV Siegburg; KCD Düsseldorf
Medal record
Event	1st	2nd	3rd
World Championships	1	2	0
European Championships	1	1	1
Total	2	3	1

Alexandra Heidrich (born 21 April 1979) is a German female canoeist who won six medals at individual senior level at the Wildwater Canoeing World Championships and European Wildwater Championships.
