= Laëtitia Parage =

French canoeist

Personal information
- Nationality: French
- Born: 5 July 1980 (age 45) Agen, France

Sport
- Sport: Canoeing
- Event: Wildwater canoeing
Medal record
Event	1st	2nd	3rd
World Championships	5	4	1
European Championships	1	0	0
Total	6	4	1

Laëtitia Parage (born 5 July 1980) is a former French female canoeist who won at senior level the Wildwater Canoeing World Championships.
