= Lenka Lagnerová =

Czech canoeist

Personal information
- Nationality: Czech
- Born: 1985 (age 40–41) Czech Republic

Sport
- Sport: Canoeing
- Event: Wildwater canoeing
Medal record
Event	1st	2nd	3rd
World Championships	1	0	1
European Championships	2	1	1
Total	3	1	2

Lenka Vandasova (born 1985) is a Czech female canoeist who won six medals at individual senior level at the Wildwater Canoeing World Championships and European Wildwater Championships.
