= Markus Gickler =

German canoeist

Personal information
- Nationality: German
- Born: 5 June 1966 (age 60) Germany

Sport
- Sport: Canoeing
- Event: Wildwater canoeing

Markus Gickler (born 5 June 1966) is a former German male canoeist who won medals at senior level the Wildwater Canoeing World Championships.
