= Normen Weber =

German canoeist

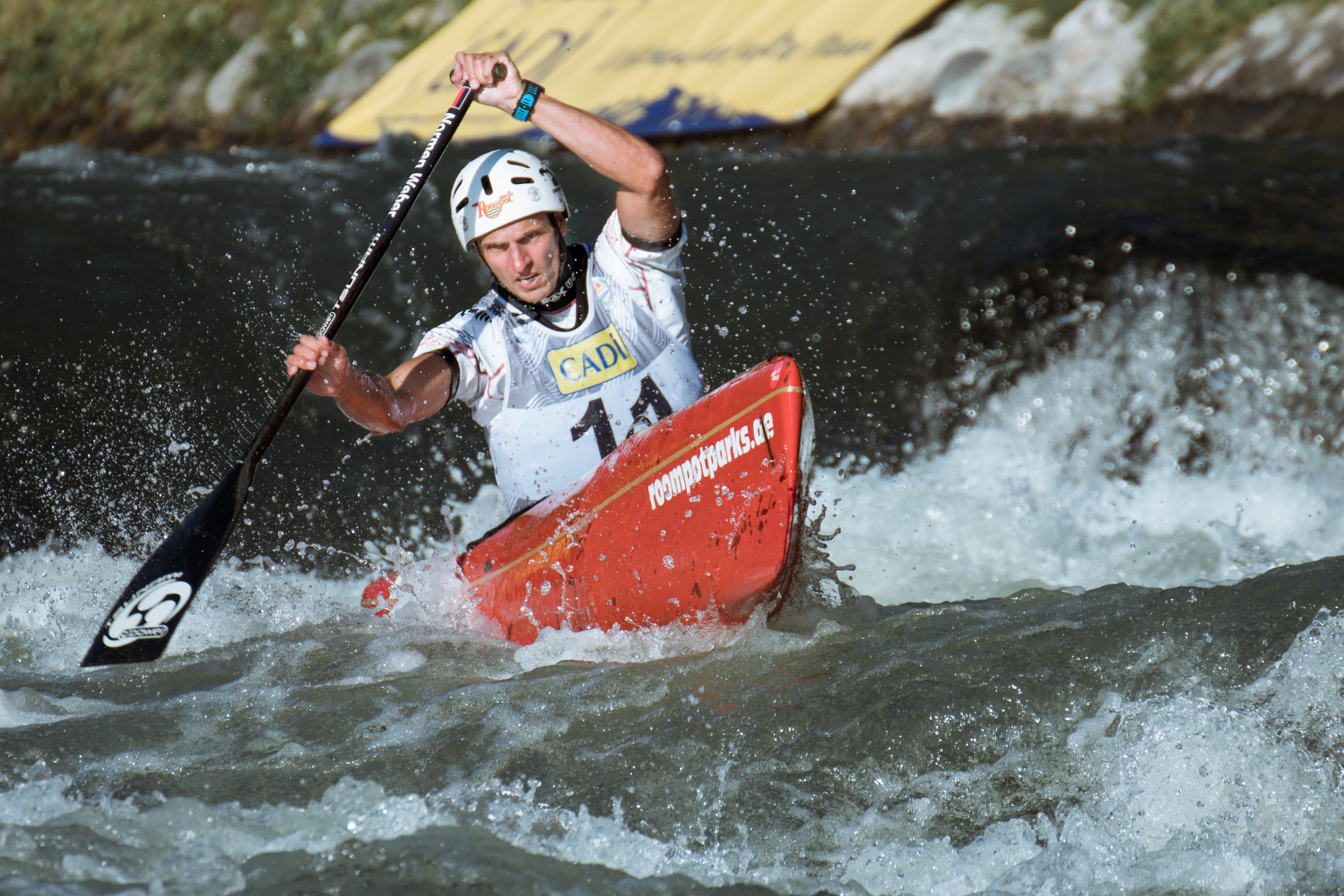
- Weber in 2019

Personal information
- Nationality: German
- Born: 18 October 1985 (age 40) Germany

Sport
- Sport: Canoeing
- Event: Wildwater canoeing
Medal record
Event	1st	2nd	3rd
World Championships	1	7	7
European Championships	3	3	4
Total	4	10	11

Normen Weber (born 18 October 1985) is a German male canoeist who won 15 medals at senior level at the Wildwater Canoeing World Championships.

== Medals at the World Championships ==
Senior

Year	1st place, gold medalist(s)	2nd place, silver medalist(s)	3rd place, bronze medalist(s)
2013	1	0	1
2014	0	1	2
2015	0	2	0
2016	0	2	3
2018	0	1	1
2019	0	1	0
