= Tomislav Lepan =

Croatian canoeist

Personal information
- Nationality: Croatian
- Born: 14 August 1979 (age 46) Zagreb, Croatia

Sport
- Sport: Canoeing
- Event: Wildwater canoeing
Medal record
Event	1st	2nd	3rd
World Championships	2	4	1
European Championships	5	4	1
Total	7	8	2

Tomislav Lepan (born 14 August 1979) is a Croatian male canoeist who won two medals at senior level at the Wildwater Canoeing World Championships.
