= Manon Durand =

French canoeist

Personal information
- Nationality: French
- Born: 15 February 1998 (age 28) France

Sport
- Sport: Canoeing
- Event: Wildwater canoeing
Medal record
Event	1st	2nd	3rd
World Championships	0	1	0
European Championships	0	1	1
Total	0	2	1

Manon Durand (born 11 February 1998) is a French female canoeist who won three medals at senior level of the Wildwater Canoeing World Championships and European Wildwater Championships.
