= Malabar River Festival =

The Malabar River Festival is a white water kayaking championship held in Kozhikode district, Kerala. Down River Extreme Rays is an important item of the game. The championship is organized by the Kerala Tourism Department, District Tourism Promotion Council and Kozhikode District Panchayat. International players from different countries are also competing in this game. The competitions will be held in the tributaries of the Chaliyar River, Iruvanjippuzha and Chalippuzha. The championship was first held in 2013. The competitions are held in various categories, including slalom, boater cross, downriver, and super final extreme races. It is the only white water kayaking championship in South India. The man who wins the championship is called Rapid Raja and the woman is called Rapid Rani. The kayaking championship begins at Pulikkayam near Kodenchery village.

== See also ==
- Kayaking
- Canoeing
