= Kateřina Vacíková =

Czech canoeist

Personal information
- Nationality: Czech
- Born: 1 February 1983 (age 43) Czech Republic

Sport
- Sport: Canoeing
- Event: Wildwater canoeing
Medal record
Event	1st	2nd	3rd
World Championships	1	1	3
European Championships	2	2	4
Total	3	3	7

Kateřina Vacíková (born 1 February 1983) is a Czech female canoeist who won 13 medals at senior level at the Wildwater Canoeing World Championships and European Wildwater Championships.
