= Charlène Le Corvaisier =

French canoeist

Personal information
- Nationality: French
- Born: 10 June 1990 (age 36) France

Sport
- Sport: Canoeing
- Event: Wildwater canoeing
Medal record
Individual
Event	1st	2nd	3rd
World Championships	0	4	0
European Championships	0	0	0
Total	0	4	0

Charlène Le Corvaisier (born 10 June 1990) is a French female canoeist who won four medals at individual senior level at the Wildwater Canoeing World Championships and European Wildwater Championships.
