= Harald Marzolf =

French canoeist

Personal information
- Nationality: French
- Born: 19 January 1980 (age 46) France

Sport
- Sport: Canoeing
- Event: Wildwater canoeing

Harald Marzolf (born 19 January 1980) is a French male canoeist who won the world championships in C1 at individual senior level at the Wildwater Canoeing World Championships.

He is the brother of the other canoeist Helgard Marzolf.
