= Costanza Bonaccorsi =

Italian canoeist

Personal information
- Nationality: Italian
- Born: 30 December 1994 (age 31) Italy

Sport
- Sport: Canoeing
- Event: Wildwater canoeing

Costanza Bonaccorsi (born 30 December 1994) is an Italian female canoeist who won at senior level the Wildwater Canoeing World Championships.
