= Jessica Oughton =

British canoeist

Personal information
- Nationality: British
- Born: 7 November 1988 (age 37) United Kingdom

Sport
- Sport: Canoeing
- Event: Wildwater canoeing
- Club: Soar Valley Canoe Club
Medal record
Event	1st	2nd	3rd
World Championships	2	1	2

Jessica Oughton (born 7 November 1988) is a British female canoeist who won at senior level the Wildwater Canoeing World Championships.

== Medals at the World Championships ==
Oughton won five medals at senior level at the Wildwater Canoeing World Championships.

Senior

Year	1st place, gold medalist(s)	2nd place, silver medalist(s)	3rd place, bronze medalist(s)
2008	0	1	0
2010	2	0	2
