= Cindy Coat =

French canoeist

Personal information
- Nationality: French
- Born: 11 November 1995 (age 30) France

Sport
- Sport: Canoeing
- Event: Wildwater canoeing
Medal record
Event	1st	2nd	3rd
World Championships	0	0	1
European Championships	0	1	2
Total	0	1	3

Cindy Coat (born 11 November 1995) is a French female canoeist who won four medals at individual senior level at the Wildwater Canoeing World Championships and European Wildwater Championships.
