= Chantal Abgottspon =

Swiss canoeist

Personal information
- Nationality: Swiss
- Born: 1 September 1990 (age 35) Switzerland

Sport
- Sport: Canoeing
- Event: Wildwater canoeing
Medal record
Event	1st	2nd	3rd
World Championships	0	0	3
European Championships	0	2	3
Total	0	2	6

Chantal Abgottspon (born 1 September 1990) is a Swiss canoeist who won eight medals at individual senior level at the Wildwater Canoeing World Championships and European Wildwater Championships.
