= Peter Žnidaršič =

Slovenian canoeist

Personal information
- Nationality: Slovenian
- Born: 7 March 1992 (age 34) Slovenia

Sport
- Sport: Canoeing
- Event: Wildwater canoeing
Medal record
Event	1st	2nd	3rd
World Championships	1	3	4

Peter Žnidarčič (born 7 March 1992) is a Slovenian male canoeist who won eight medals at the World champion at Wildwater Canoeing World Championships.
