= Alice Panato =

Italian canoeist

Personal information
- Nationality: Italian
- Born: 19 October 1999 (age 26) Verona, Italy

Sport
- Sport: Canoeing
- Event: Wildwater canoeing
- Club: Canoa Club Pescantina
- Coached by: Vladi Panato
Medal record
Event	1st	2nd	3rd
World Championships	1	1	0
European Championships	4	2	2
Total	5	3	2
Wildwater World Championships
Gold medal – first place	2018 Muotathal	C2 classic
Silver medal – second place	2018 Muotathal	C1 classic team

Alice Panato (born 19 October 1999) is an Italian female canoeist who won two medals at senior level at the Wildwater Canoeing World Championships.

Her father is the canoeing legend Vladi Panato, also her sister Cecilia is a canoeist, he is also their coach

== Medals at the World Championships ==
Senior

Year	1st place, gold medalist(s)	2nd place, silver medalist(s)	3rd place, bronze medalist(s)
2018	1	1	0
