= Tomislav Hohnjec =

Croatian canoeist

Personal information
- Nationality: Croatian
- Born: 13 November 1979 (age 46) Zagreb, Croatia

Sport
- Sport: Canoeing
- Event: Wildwater canoeing
- Club: Kajakaški Savez Zagreb
Medal record
Event	1st	2nd	3rd
World Championships	1	1	0

Tomislav Hohnjec (born 13 November 1979) is a Croatian male canoeist who won a world championship at senior level at the Wildwater Canoeing World Championships and twice the Wildwater Canoeing World Cup
