= Blaž Cof =

Slovenian canoeist

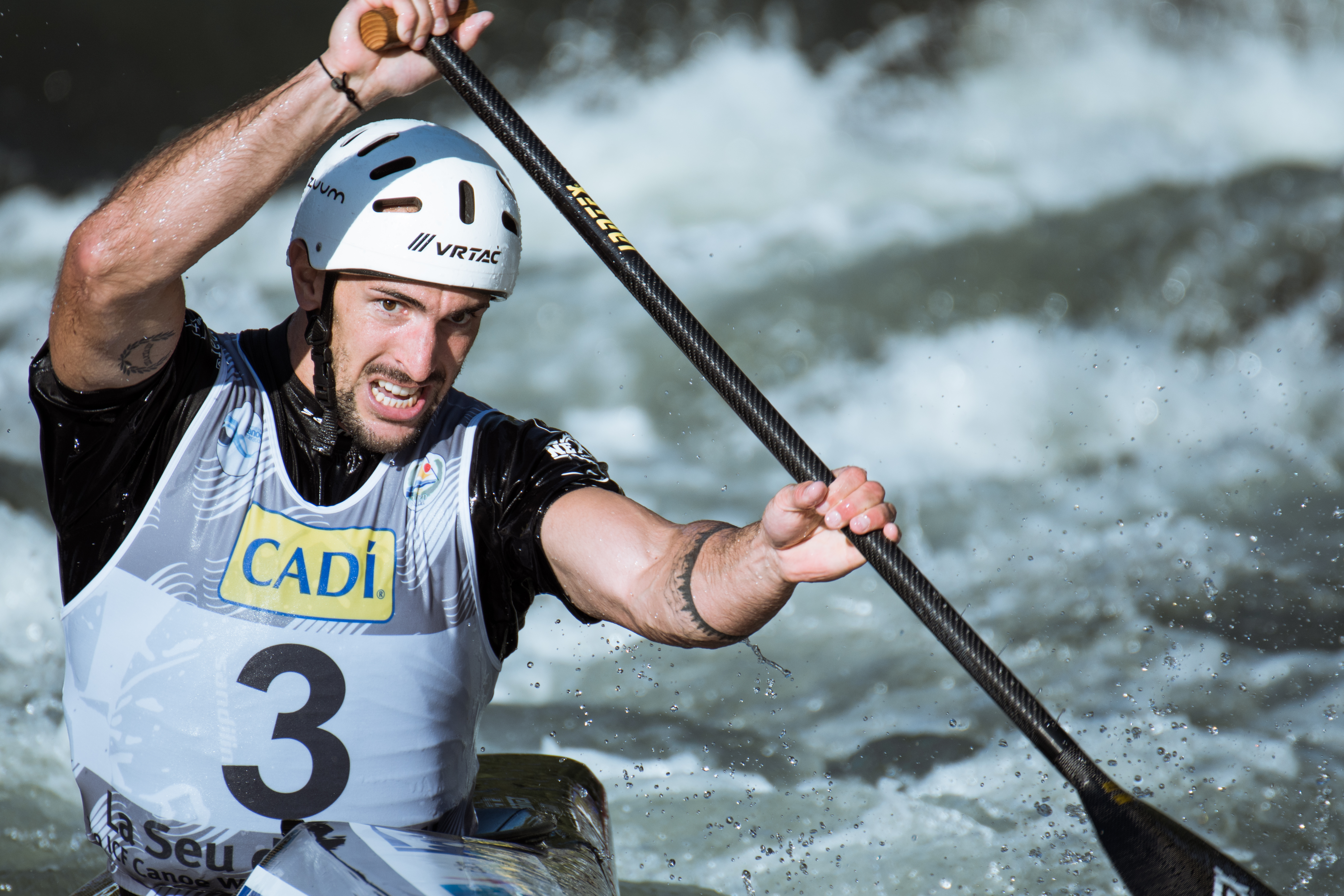
- Cof in 2019

Personal information
- Nationality: Slovenian
- Born: 5 July 1991 (age 34) Slovenia

Sport
- Sport: Canoeing
- Event: Wildwater canoeing

Blaž Cof (born 5 July 1991) is a Slovenian wildwater canoeist. He is a world champion in the C1 sprint event (2018) and one of the most successful Slovenian athletes in the wildwater sprint discipline. Wildwater Canoeing World Championships.

In 2026, he was awarded the Bloudkova plaketa, the highest national recognition in Slovenian sport, for his achievements and contribution to sport.

== Career ==
Cof started his career competing in both canoe slalom and wildwater canoeing before specializing in wildwater sprint. He achieved his greatest success in 2018, winning the gold medal in the C1 sprint at the ICF Wildwater Canoeing World Championships.

He remained among the top international competitors for over a decade, winning multiple medals at World Championships and achieving consistent podium finishes in the World Cup circuit. He concluded his top-level competitive career with a silver medal at the 2023 World Championships.

== World Championships ==
=== Senior ===
- Gold medal – C1 sprint (2018)
- Silver medal – C1 sprint (2023)
- Bronze medal – C1 sprint (2013)
- Bronze medal – C1 sprint (2017)
- Silver medal – C2 sprint (2013)
- Silver medal – C2 sprint (2014)
- Bronze medal – C2 sprint (2015)

=== European Championships ===
- Silver medal – C1 sprint (2013)
- Silver medal – C1 sprint (2023)
- Bronze medal – C1 sprint (2011)
- Bronze medal – C1 classic (2019)
- Gold medal – C2 sprint (2015)

== World Cup ==
Cof was a regular podium contender in the ICF Wildwater Canoeing World Cup, particularly in the C1 sprint discipline.

- Multiple World Cup podium finishes (C1 sprint)
- Consistent top rankings in overall World Cup standings
- Among the leading European sprint specialists during the 2010s and early 2020s

== Awards ==
- Bloudkova plaketa (2025, awarded in 2026)
