= Tomáš Slovák =

Slovak ice hockey player

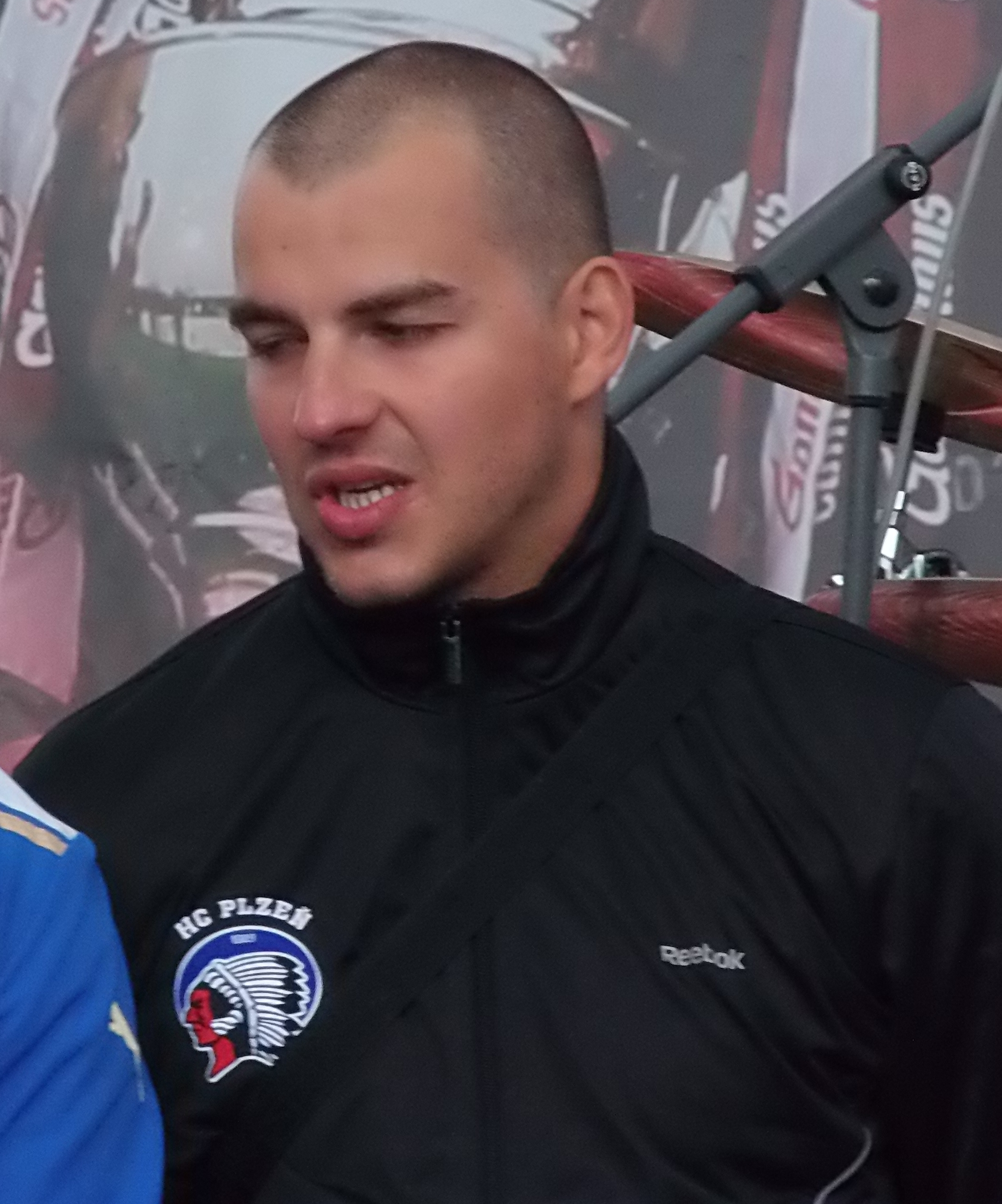
- Born: April 5, 1983 (age 43) Košice, Czechoslovakia
- Height: 6 ft 1 in (185 cm)
- Weight: 209 lb (95 kg; 14 st 13 lb)
- Position: Defence
- Shoots: Right
- team Former teams: Free agent HC Košice; Kelowna Rockets; Hershey Bears; Reading Royals; Lowell Lock Monsters; Mora IK; SaiPa; MsHK Žilina; Ilves; Augsburger Panther; Avtomobilist Yekaterinburg; Piráti Chomutov; HC Dynamo Minsk; HK Gomel; HC Plzeň; HK Hradec Kralove; Brynäs IF; HC Oceláři Třinec; DVTK Jegesmedvék
- NHL draft: 42nd overall, 2001; Nashville Predators
- Playing career: 2000–present

Tomáš Slovák (born April 5, 1983) is a Slovak professional ice hockey defenceman. He is currently a free agent.

He was originally drafted 42nd overall by the Nashville Predators in the 2001 NHL entry draft.

== Playing career ==
Slovak played as a youth in the developmental program of hometown club, HC Košice, from 1997 to 2001. He made his Slovak Extraliga debut with Košice in the 1999–00 season, appearing in a pair of games. After impressing on the international junior stage for the Slovak junior team, Slovak was selected by the Nashville Predators in the second round, 42nd overall, in the 2001 NHL entry draft.

With intention to pursue an NHL career, Slovak opted to play major junior hockey in North America after he was drafted 4th overall in the 2001 CHL Import Draft by the Kelowna Rockets of the Western Hockey League (WHL). Slovak enjoyed a standout second season with the Rockets in 2002–03, contributing with 71 points in 65 games to lead the league amongst defensemen. Having concluded his junior career, Slovak's was expected to compete for a roster position on the Predators defense corps. However, with the Predators going heavy in 2003 NHL entry draft on blue chip defenseman Ryan Suter and Shea Weber, his rights were traded by the Nashville Predators to the Colorado Avalanche in exchange for Sergei Soin on June 21, 2003.

On July 15, 2003, Slovak agreed to a three-year, entry-level contract with the Avalanche. After attending the Avalanche's training camp, Slovak was assigned to begin his rookie season with affiliate, Hershey Bears, of the American Hockey League. In the 2003–04 season, Slovak split time between the Bears and the Reading Royals of the ECHL. He contributed with 11 points in 43 AHL games. In the following 2004–05 season, with his role affected with the Bears by the 2004–05 NHL Lockout, Slovak returned to Slovakia after just one game with the Bears and played out the season with HC Košice.

Slovak returned to North America for the final year of his entry-level contract with the Avalanche in the 2005–06 season. He was familiarly assigned by Colorado to the AHL, playing with new partner the Lowell Lock Monsters. In 59 games, Slovak produced just 8 assists from the blueline, signalling the end of his tenure within the Avalanche organization.

On the opening day of free agency, Slovak was unable to gain NHL interest and opted to sign a contract with Swedish club, Mora IK of the then Elitserien on July 1, 2006. He played just 6 games with Mora in the 2006–07 season, before embarking on a tumultuous year by playing in four separate European teams in three different leagues.

From his return to European hockey, Slovak adapted to his journeyman status and has played in 6 countries and 14 clubs.

Playing predominately in the Czech Extraliga over the last 7 years, Slovak agreed to extend his playing career by signing a one-year contract with Piráti Chomutov on May 1, 2017. His signing marked a return to Chomutov after 6 years from his first stint in the Czech 1st Division.

== Career statistics ==
=== Regular season and playoffs ===
			Regular season					Playoffs
Season	Team	League	GP	G	A	Pts	PIM	GP	G	A	Pts	PIM
1997–98	HC Košice	SVK U20	47	1	6	7	24	—	—	—	—	—
1998–99	HC VSŽ Košice	SVK U20	45	6	14	20	65	—	—	—	—	—
1999–2000	HC VSŽ Košice	SVK U20	55	16	28	44	119	—	—	—	—	—
1999–2000	HC VSŽ Košice	SVK	2	0	0	0	0	—	—	—	—	—
2000–01	HC Košice	SVK U20	3	1	1	2	6	—	—	—	—	—
2000–01	HC Košice	SVK	43	5	5	10	28	3	1	0	1	2
2001–02	Kelowna Rockets	WHL	53	2	24	26	41	15	0	0	0	8
2002–03	Kelowna Rockets	WHL	65	18	53	71	86	19	2	20	22	26
2003–04	Hershey Bears	AHL	43	3	8	11	16	—	—	—	—	—
2003–04	Reading Royals	ECHL	20	3	7	10	32	—	—	—	—	—
2004–05	Hershey Bears	AHL	1	0	0	0	2	—	—	—	—	—
2004–05	HC Košice	SVK	33	3	11	14	42	10	1	2	3	24
2005–06	Lowell Lock Monsters	AHL	59	0	8	8	61	—	—	—	—	—
2006–07	Mora IK	SEL	6	0	0	0	51	—	—	—	—	—
2006–07	SaiPa	SM-liiga	6	0	1	1	4	—	—	—	—	—
2006–07	MsHK Žilina	SVK	16	1	1	2	30	—	—	—	—	—
2006–07	Ilves	SM-liiga	13	1	5	6	12	7	0	1	1	18
2007–08	Augsburger Panther	DEL	56	4	9	13	82	—	—	—	—	—
2008–09	Augsburger Panther	DEL	34	1	7	8	28	—	—	—	—	—
2008–09	HC Košice	SVK	16	1	3	4	12	18	1	4	5	42
2009–10	Avtomobilist Yekaterinburg	KHL	51	2	4	6	66	4	0	1	1	2
2010–11	Avtomobilist Yekaterinburg	KHL	20	0	3	3	44	—	—	—	—	—
2010–11	KLH Chomutov	CZE.2	10	3	6	9	22	13	1	6	7	14
2011–12	Dinamo Minsk	KHL	31	1	1	2	25	1	0	0	0	2
2011–12	HK Gomel	BLR	1	0	0	0	0	—	—	—	—	—
2012–13	HC Škoda Plzeň	ELH	27	4	7	11	8	19	1	4	5	10
2013–14	HC Škoda Plzeň	ELH	47	4	9	13	34	6	1	0	1	2
2014–15	Mountfield HK	ELH	30	2	15	17	28	—	—	—	—	—
2014–15	Brynäs IF	SHL	21	1	2	3	6	7	1	1	2	0
2015–16	HC Košice	SVK	5	0	0	0	0	—	—	—	—	—
2015–16	HC Oceláři Třinec	ELH	25	0	2	2	12	4	0	0	0	0
2016–17	HC Škoda Plzeň	ELH	16	0	2	2	28	—	—	—	—	—
2016–17	MsHK DOXXbet Žilina	SVK	3	0	0	0	2	—	—	—	—	—
2017–18	Piráti Chomutov	ELH	48	3	8	11	16	—	—	—	—	—
2018–19	DVTK Jegesmedvék	SVK	39	1	3	4	20	—	—	—	—	—
2018–19	HC Košice	SVK	8	0	4	4	8	6	0	4	4	2
2019–20	HC Košice	SVK	46	0	6	6	18	—	—	—	—	—
2020–21	HC Košice	SVK	46	0	4	4	66	4	1	0	1	2
2021–22	HK Trebišov	SVK.3	3	0	4	4	2	9	3	4	7	25
SVK totals			257	11	37	48	226	41	4	10	14	72
KHL totals			102	3	8	11	135	5	0	1	1	4
ELH totals			193	13	43	56	126	29	2	4	6	12

=== International ===
Year	Team	Event	Result	GP	G	A	Pts	PIM
2001	Slovakia	WJC	8th	7	1	1	2	8
2001	Slovakia	WJC18	8th	6	0	1	1	16
2003	Slovakia	WJC	5th	6	0	0	0	36
Junior totals				19	1	2	3	60

== Awards and honors ==
Award	Year
WHL
West First All-Star Team	2003
Slovak
Champion	2009
Czech
Champion	2013
