= Klára Hricová =

Czech canoeist

Personal information
- Nationality: Czech
- Born: 13 March 1999 (age 27) Czech Republic

Sport
- Sport: Canoeing
- Event: Wildwater canoeing
Medal record
Event	1st	2nd	3rd
European Championships	3	0	0

Klára Hricová (born 25 November 1999) is a Czech female canoeist who won three gold medals at individual senior level at the European Wildwater Championships.
