= Stephan Stiefenhöfer =

German canoeist

Personal information
- Nationality: German
- Born: 17 September 1972 (age 53) Cologne, Germany

Sport
- Sport: Canoeing
- Event: Wildwater canoeing
- Club: Verein für Wassersport Blau-Weiss Köln
Medal record
Wildwater canoeing
Event	1st	2nd	3rd
World Championships	2	3	4

Bernhard Stiefenhöfer (born 1 September 1972) is a former German male canoeist who won several medals at senior level the Wildwater Canoeing World Championships.
