= Ondřej Rolenc =

Czech canoeist

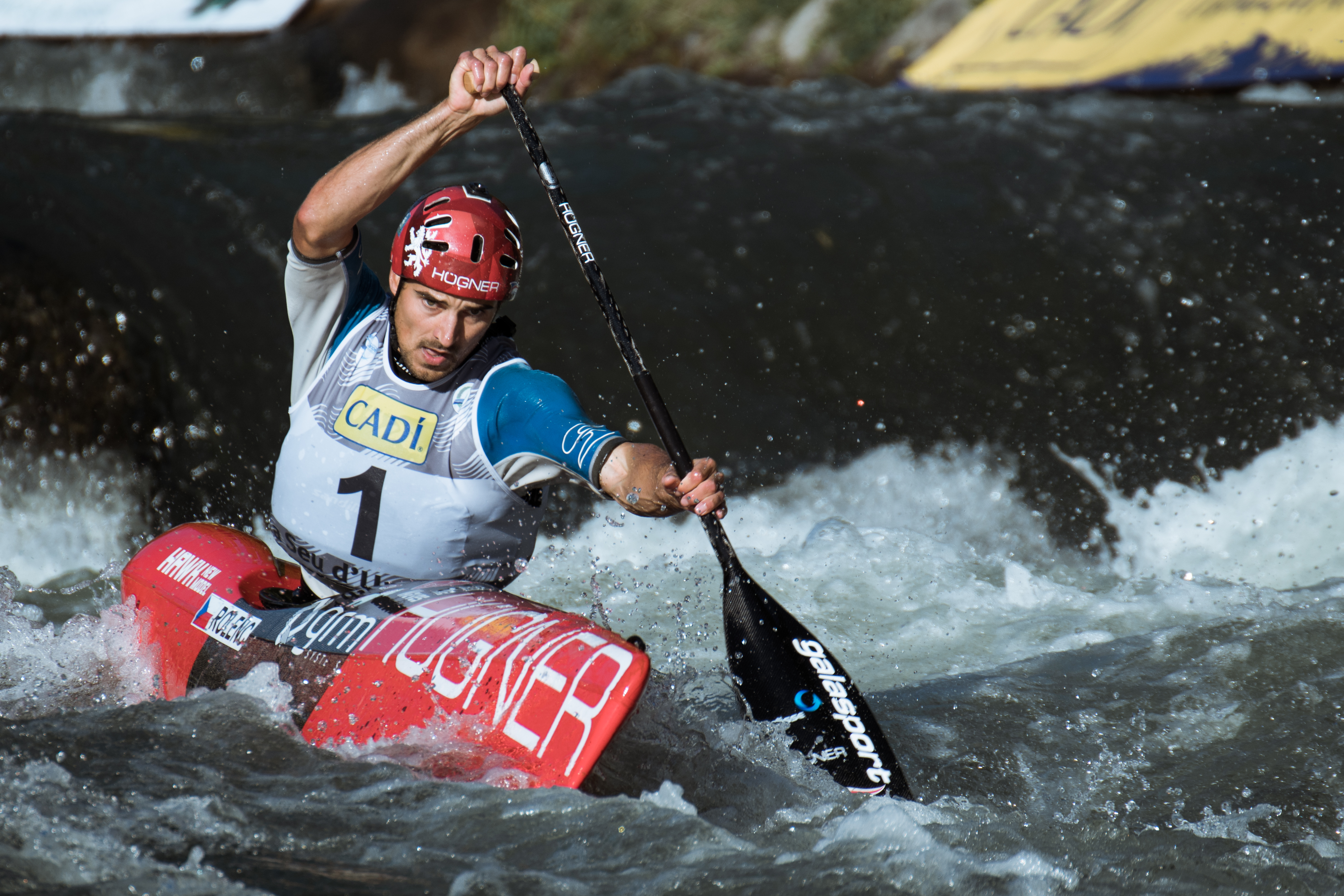
- Rolenc in 2019

Personal information
- Nationality: Czech
- Born: 7 November 1991 (age 34) Czech Republic
- Height: 188 cm (6 ft 2 in)
- Weight: 83 kg (183 lb)

Sport
- Sport: Canoeing
- Event: Wildwater canoeing
- Club: TJ Synthesia Pardubice
- Coached by: Jan Šťastný (Chrudoš)
Medal record
Event	1st	2nd	3rd
World Championships	14	18	13

Ondřej Rolenc (born 7 November 1991) is a Czech male canoeist who won 45 medals (8x individual Gold - 6x C1 and 2x C2) at senior level at the Wildwater Canoeing World Championships.

== Biography ==
Rolenc won a Wildwater Canoeing World Cup in C1.

== Medals at the World Championships ==
Senior

Year	1st place, gold medalist(s)	2nd place, silver medalist(s)	3rd place, bronze medalist(s)
2008	0	1	0
2010	1	0	0
2011	0	0	1
2012	0	1	4
2013	0	1	2
2014	1	3	0
2015	0	1	0
2016	3	0	1
2017	1	1	0
2018	3	1	1
2019	0	2	1
2021	2	1	0
2022	1	1	1
2023	1	0	1
2024	1	5	1
Total	14	18	13
