= Simon Oven =

Slovenian canoeist

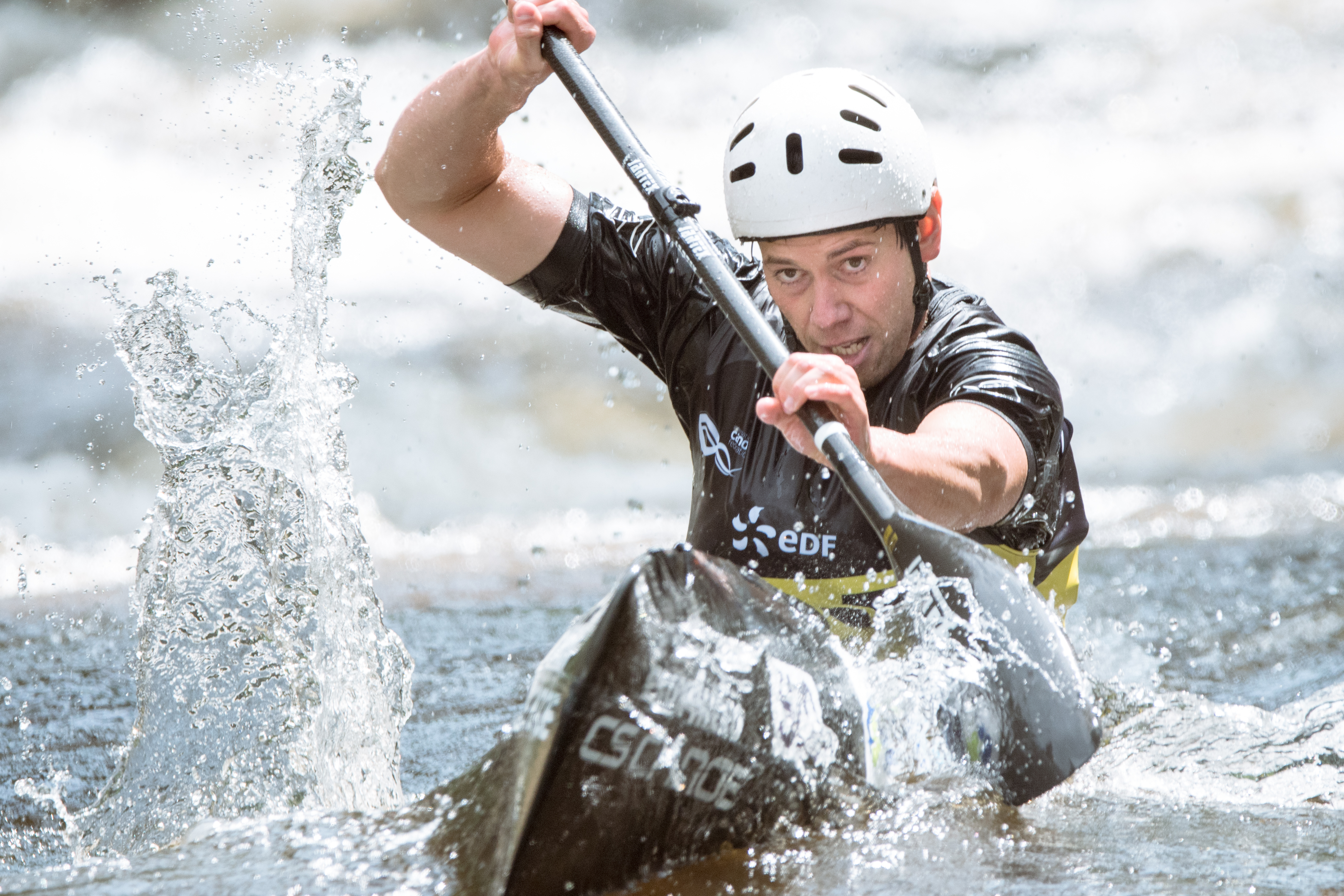
- Oven in 2022

Personal information
- Nationality: Slovenian
- Born: 14 February 1993 (age 33) Slovenia

Sport
- Sport: Canoeing
- Event: Wildwater canoeing
- Club: Canoe Club Ljubljana
Medal record
Event	1st	2nd	3rd
World Championships	2	2	0

Simon Oven (born 14 February 1993) is a Slovenian male canoeist who won four medals at senior level at the Wildwater Canoeing World Championships.

Oven won two editions of the Wildwater Canoeing World Cup in K1.

== Medals at the World Championships ==
Senior

Year	1st place, gold medalist(s)	2nd place, silver medalist(s)	3rd place, bronze medalist(s)
2016	0	1	0
2017	0	1	0
2018	1	0	0
2019	1	0	0
