= Cecilia Panato =

Italian canoeist

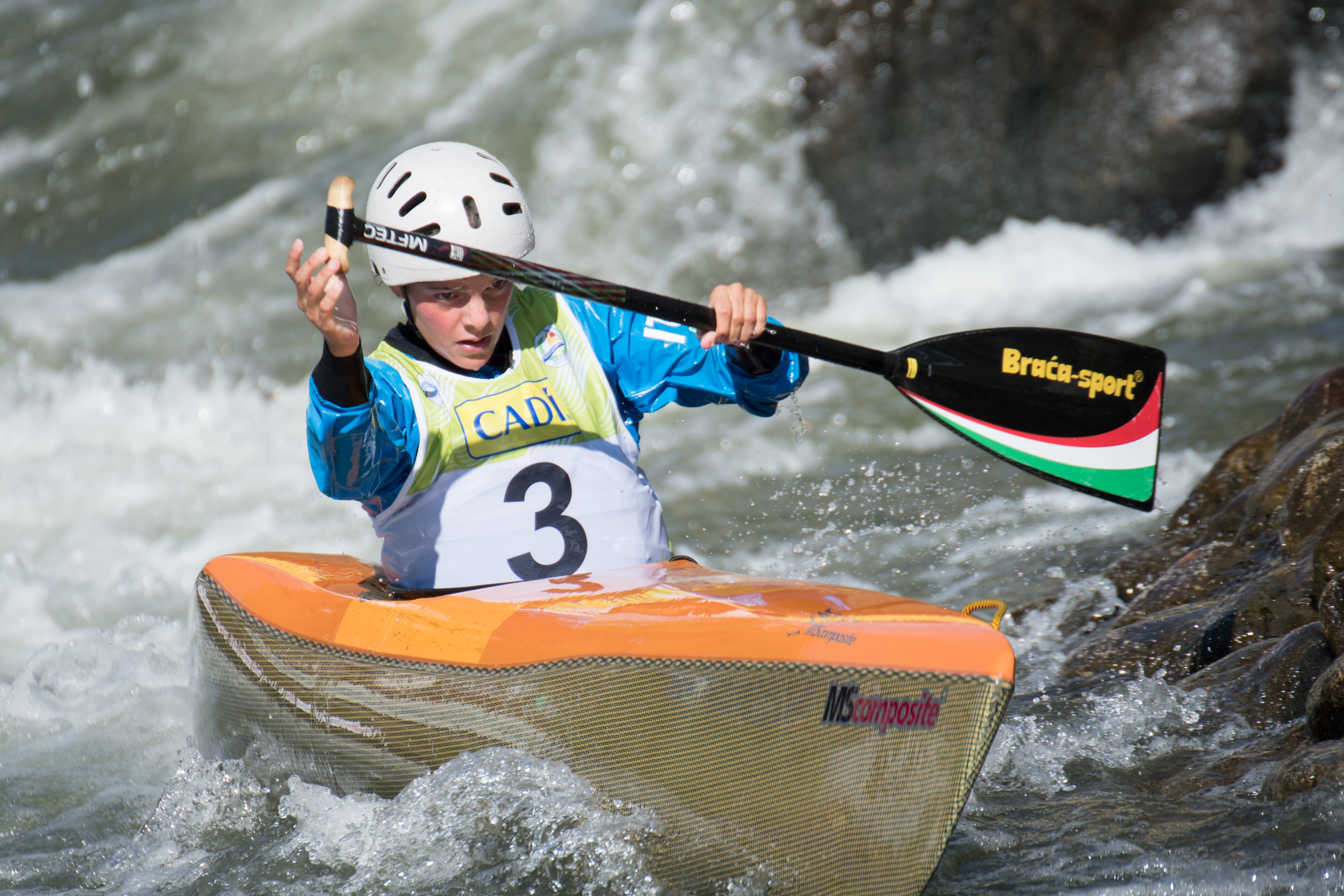
- Cecilia in 2019 at the World champs

Personal information
- National team: Italiana
- Born: 16 January 2002 (age 24) Verona, Italy
- Height: 1.66
- Weight: 50 kg (110 lb)

Sport
- Sport: Canoeing
- Event: Wildwater canoeing
- Club: Canoa Club Pescantina
- Coached by: Vladi Panato
Medal record
Event	1st	2nd	3rd
World Championships	2	4	0
European Championships	4	2	2
Total	6	6	2
Wildwater World Championships
Gold medal – first place	2018 Muotathal	C1 sprint
Gold medal – first place	2018 Muotathal	C2 classic
Silver medal – second place	2018 Muotathal	C1 classic
Silver medal – second place	2018 Muotathal	C1 classic team
Silver medal – second place	2019 La Seu d'Urgell	C1
Silver medal – second place	2019 La Seu d'Urgell	C2

Cecilia Panato (born 16 January 2002) is an Italian female canoeist who won six medals at senior level at the Wildwater Canoeing World Championships.

Her father is the canoeing legend Vladi Panato, also her sister Alice is a canoeist, he is also their coach.

== Achievements ==
Year	Competition	Rank	Event	Notes
2017	Wildwater Canoeing World Cup	1st	C1	
2017	Wildwater Canoeing World Cup	1st	C2	
2018	Wildwater Canoeing World Cup	1st	C1	
