= Sabine Eichenberger =

Swiss canoeist

Personal information
- Nationality: Swiss
- Born: 25 September 1968 (age 57) Switzerland

Sport
- Sport: Canoeing
- Event: Wildwater canoeing
Medal record
Women's canoe sprint
Representing Switzerland
Olympic Games
Silver medal – second place	1996 Atlanta	K-4 500 m
Wildwater canoeing
Event	1st	2nd	3rd
World Championships	2	1	8
European Championships	3	4	6
Total	5	5	14

Sabine Eichenberger (born 25 September 1968) is a Swiss sprint canoer who competed in the mid-1990s. She won a silver medal in the K-4 500 m event at the 1996 Summer Olympics in Atlanta.
