= Mathilde Rosa =

Italian canoeist

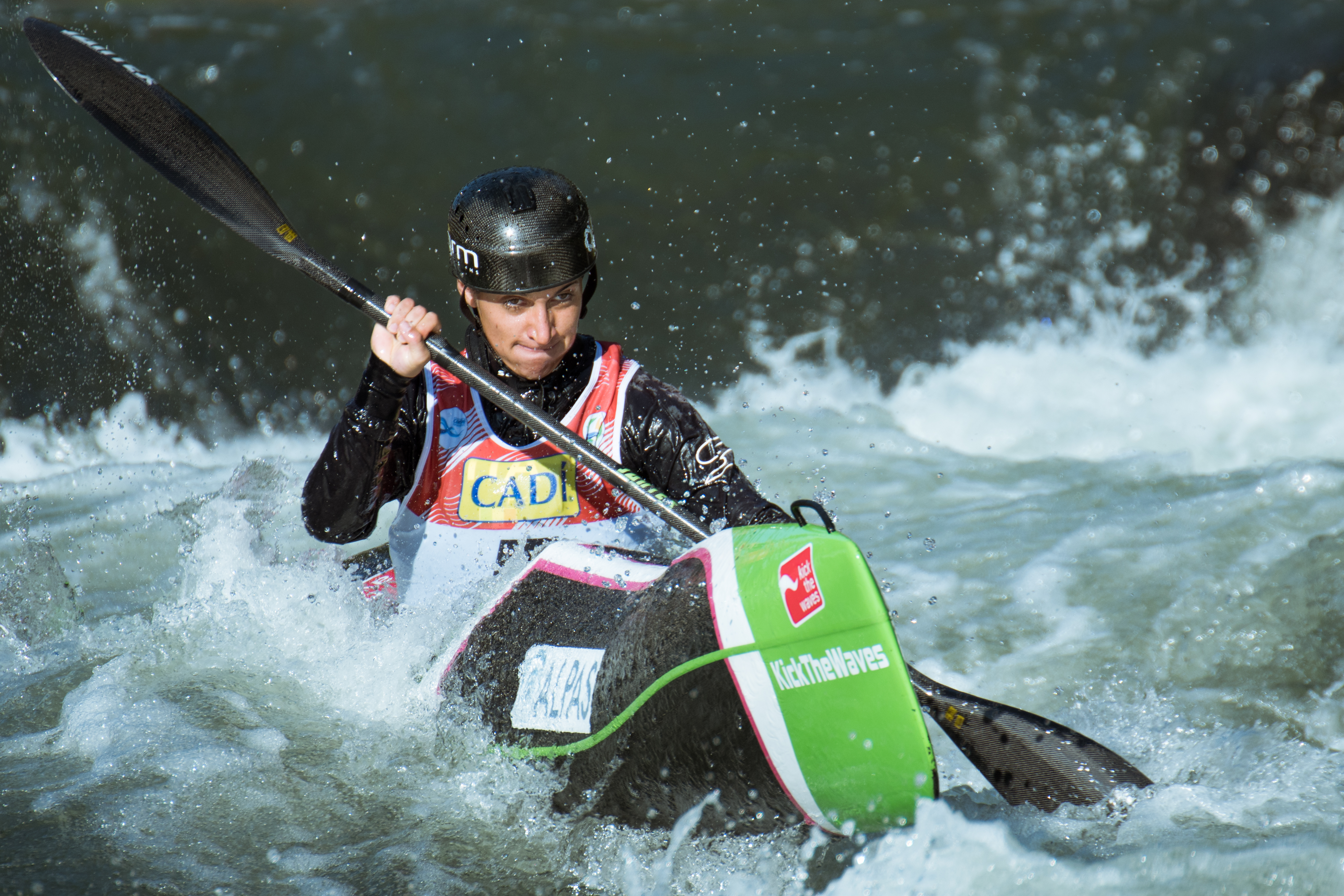
- Rosa in 2019

Personal information
- Nationality: Italian
- Born: 28 January 1997 (age 29) Villeneuve la garenne (FRANCE)

Sport
- Sport: Canoeing
- Event: Wildwater canoeing
- Club: CUS Pavia
Medal record
Event	1st	2nd	3rd
World Championships	3	5	2
European Championships	3	0	2
Total	6	5	4

Mathilde Rosa (born 28 January 1997) is an Italian female canoeist who won nine medals at senior level at the Wildwater Canoeing World Championships.
