= Marlene Ricciardi =

Italian canoeist

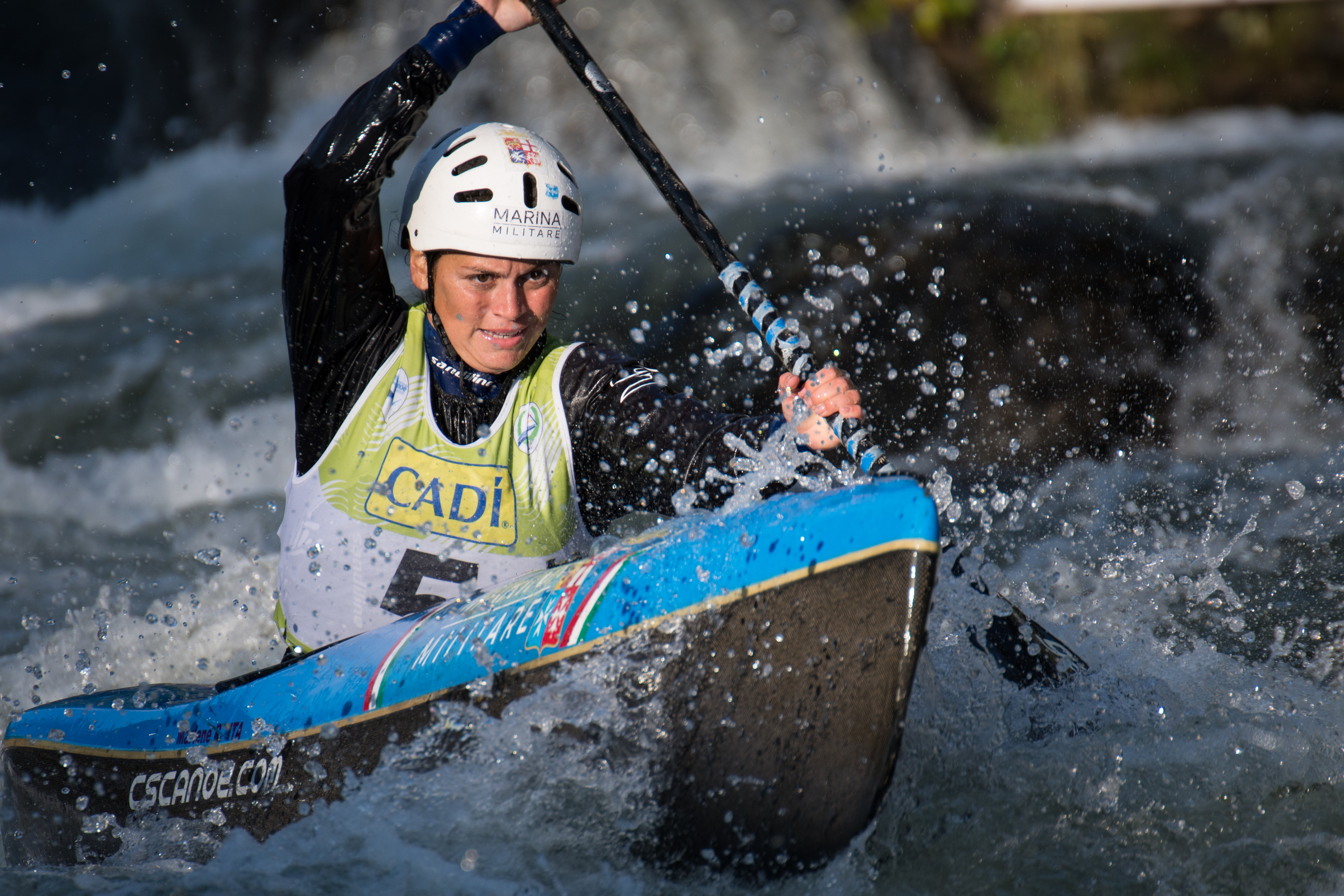
- Ricciardi in 2019

Personal information
- Nationality: Italian
- Born: 3 January 1992 (age 34) Sarzana, Italy

Sport
- Sport: Canoeing
- Event: Wildwater canoeing
- Club: G.S. Marina Militare
Medal record
Event	1st	2nd	3rd
World Championships	0	4	2
European Championships	3	0	2
Total	3	4	4

Marlene Ricciardi (born 3 January 1992) is an Italian female canoeist who won six medals at senior level at the Wildwater Canoeing World Championships.
