= Nejc Žnidarčič =

Slovenian canoeist

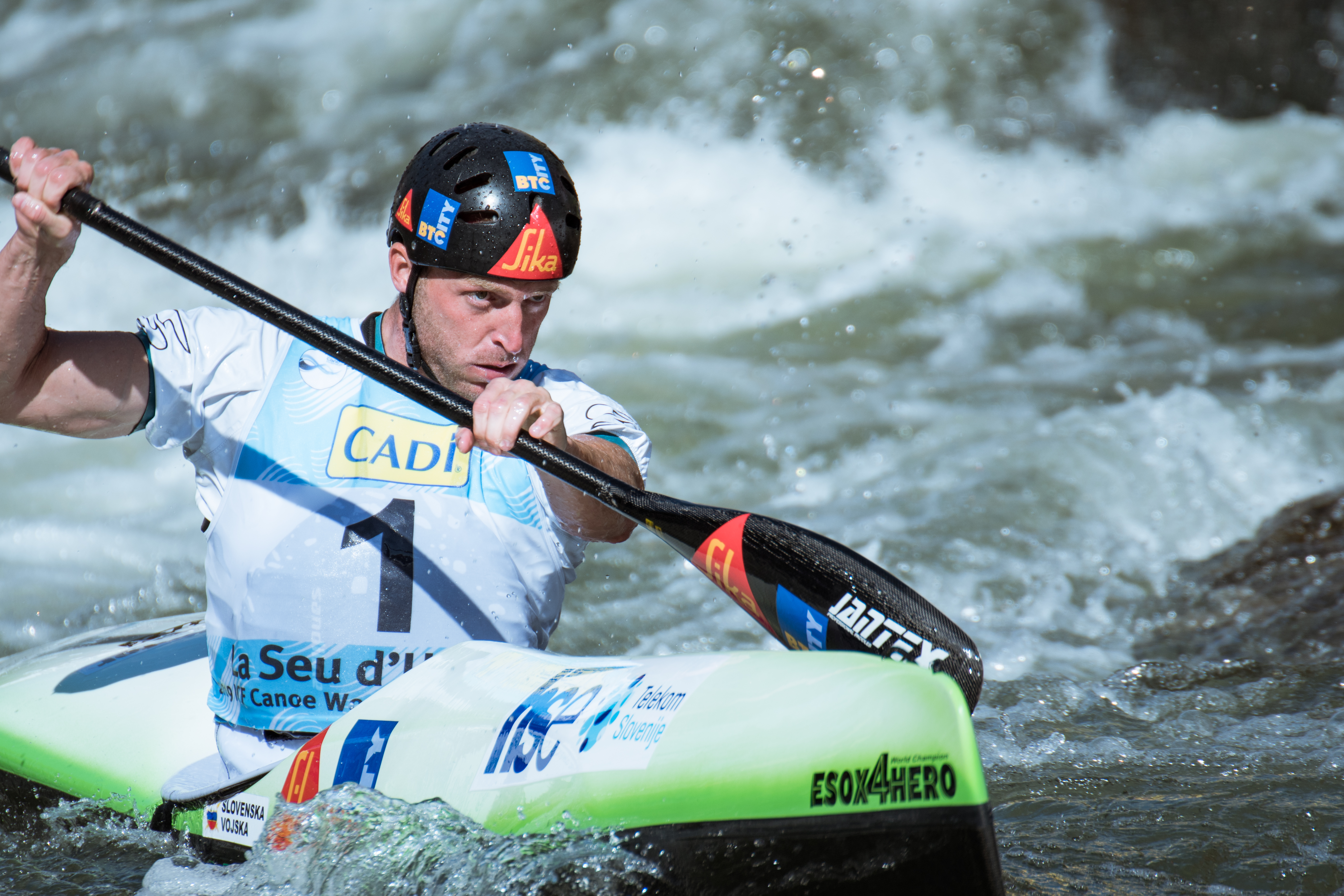

Personal information
- Nationality: Slovenian
- Born: 1 April 1984 (age 42) Šempeter pri Gorici, Slovenia, Yugoslavia

Sport
- Sport: Canoeing
- Event: Wildwater canoeing
Medal record
Event	1st	2nd	3rd
World Championships	10	7	5

Nejc Žnidarčič (born 1 April 1984) is a Slovenian male canoeist who was World champion at Wildwater Canoeing World Championships in 2011, 2012 and 2019.
