= Stéphane Santamaria =

French canoeist

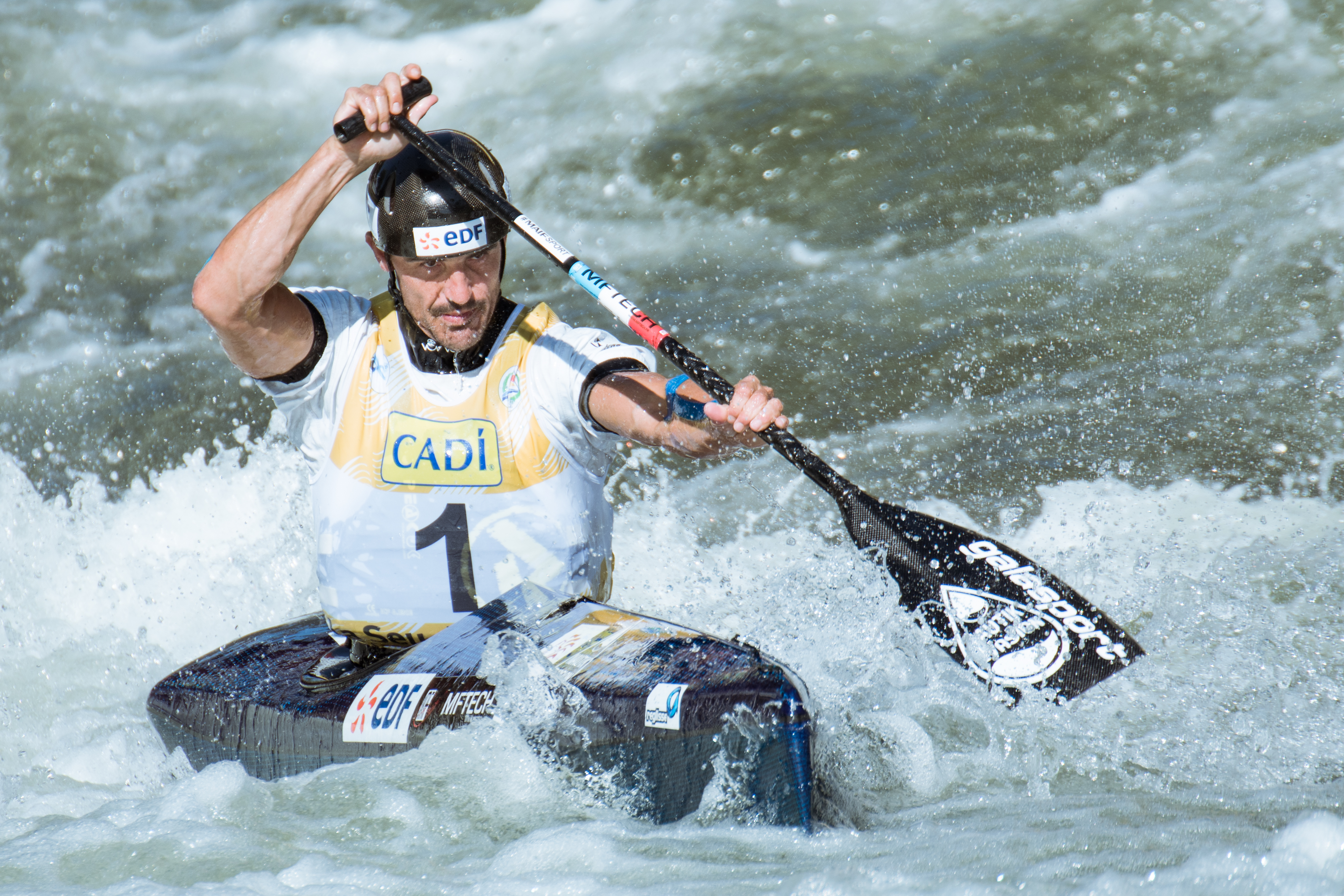
- Santamaria in 2019

Personal information
- Nationality: French
- Born: 22 May 1977 (age 49) France

Sport
- Sport: Canoeing
- Event: Wildwater canoeing
Medal record
Event	1st	2nd	3rd
World Championships	13	3	2

Stéphane Santamaria (born 22 May 1977) is a French male canoeist who won 18 medals at senior level at the Wildwater Canoeing World Championships.

== Medals at the World Championships ==
Senior

Year	1st place, gold medalist(s)	2nd place, silver medalist(s)	3rd place, bronze medalist(s)
2013	1	0	0
2014	4	0	0
2016	2	3	1
2017	2	0	0
2018	3	0	0
2019	1	0	1
