= Wildwater canoeing =

Type of boat racing

Wildwater canoeing is a competitive discipline of canoeing in which kayaks or canoes are used to negotiate a stretch of river speedily. It is also called "Whitewater racing" or "Downriver racing" to distinguish it from whitewater slalom racing and whitewater rodeo or Freestyle competition.

== General ==
The objective of the sport is to go from the starting point of the course on a river to the end point as quickly as possible. Typical wildwater venues consist of Class II - IV whitewater, in contrast to extreme racing, which takes place on more difficult streams. Match competitions generally consist of a classic and a sprint race. A classic course is 4 to 6 miles (6–10 km) in length or 10 to 35 minutes in duration, while the Sprint is between 500 and 750 meters and lasts around 2 minutes. Although there is some specialization, the vast majority of racers compete in both classic and sprint.

Competitors are placed in classes based on gender and boat type as follows:

- K1 – solo kayak, male
- K1W – solo kayak, female
- C1 – solo canoe, male
- C1W – solo canoe, female
- C2 – tandem canoe.

The competitors are numbered within their class based on results from previous races and compete in reverse order (best paddler last), usually at one-minute intervals. To race successfully, paddlers must possess refined technical skill, as well as strength, endurance, aerobic capacity, and the ability to "read" whitewater.

Whitewater racing is also practiced by competing teams; each team is made by a group of three competitors belonging to the same class.

Whitewater racing started in Europe with the International Canoe Federation being formed and having the first World Championships in Switzerland in 1949. Since then, there has been a World Championships every two years. Since 2011 there is a sprint only world championships, with sprint and classic being contested every other (even) year.

== Boat design ==
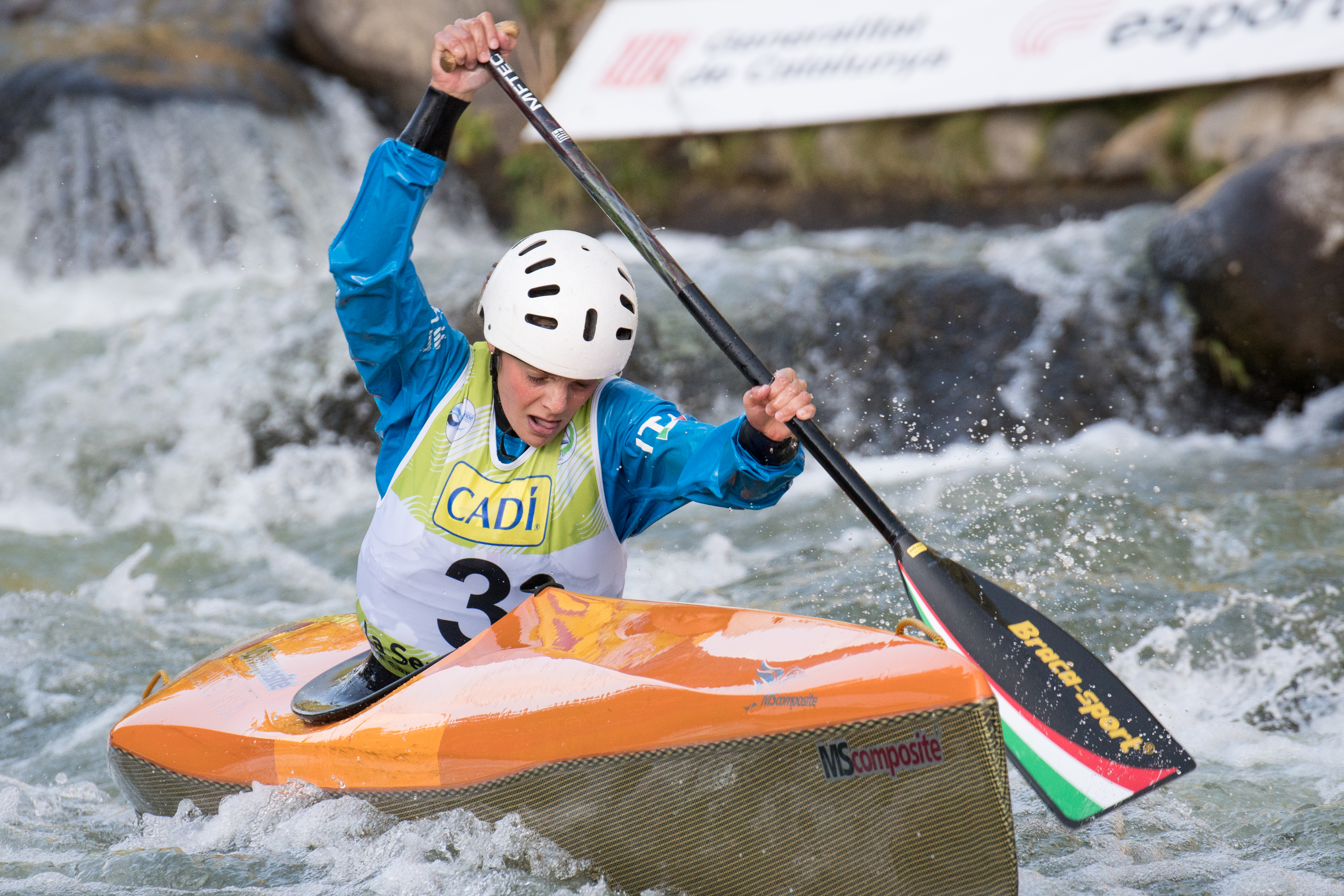
Wildwater canoeist

Training in capsizing the kayak and turning the kayak over and emerging from the water using a paddle

- Wildwater solo kayaks (K1) are 4.5 m (14 ft 9 in) long and 60 cm (23.6 in) wide;
- Wildwater solo canoes (C-1) are 4.3 m (14 ft 1 in) long and 70 cm (27.5 in) wide;
- Wildwater tandem canoes (C-2) are 5 m (16 ft 5 in) long and 80 cm (31.5 in) wide.

The boats all have a rounded hull profile, making them fast but unstable and hard to turn. Rather than using wide sweep strokes to turn the boat, the paddler tilts the boat to one side, utilizing its curved profile to effect the turn in a manner similar to "carving a turn" in skiing. Two "wings" (flaring protrusions near the stern hull) meet the minimum width required by racing rules and add secondary stability, as well as enhancing the effect of carving a turn. When the boat is under way, most of each wing will be above the waterline so as to minimize drag. The use of kevlar, carbon fiber, and glass-reinforced plastic construction has substantially reduced the weight of wildwater boats, while improving stiffness. The top part (the deck) and the bottom (the hull) are molded separately and then bonded together using kevlar or glass cloth strips and epoxy or polyester resin. A boat can be made in 2 to 3 days, but without an oven can take weeks to cure fully.

Before glass-reinforced plastic boats, the common racing craft was the folding kayak, usually composed of a wooden frame covered with canvas.

Competitors are also required to wear an appropriate whitewater helmet and PFD and River shoes or booties and flotation bags for their boats.

== Training and racing ==
Racers paddle down a course along the fastest jets of water. In order to go fast, they follow the edges of wave trains and hold as straight a line as possible down the river. If it is unclear which line is fastest, two paddlers simultaneously float the different options and see which boat moves ahead. Because of the high speeds, racers frequently run a river two or three times a day when training for a race.

Some racers practice on rivers if they are lucky to live near one. Usually they will paddle 5–10 miles a day, five to six days a week. Others practice on lakes or flatwater rivers. In northern areas rivers and lakes freeze, so racers sometimes train in an indoor pool, lift weights, run or do Cross-country skiing. When the rivers and lakes become free of ice then training is resumed outdoors.

== Rivers ==
Popular whitewater racing courses in Scotland include Grandtully and Stanley on the River Tay. Whitewater racing courses in England include the Washburn and the Tees. Popular whitewater racing courses in Wales include the Tryweryn, and the Dee.
In the United States, races take place throughout the Southeast, Northeast, Northwest, and Western states; rivers there include the Nantahala and Pigeon in North Carolina and the Ocoee in Tennessee. There are also well-attended annual races on West Virginia's Cheat and Gauley rivers, Maryland's Potomac and Youghiogheny ("Yough") rivers, as well as on Colorado's Arkansas for the annual Fibark Festival which has the oldest continually run downriver/wildwater race in the USA.

Rivers in Europe that have held international races include the Isère in Bourg St Maurice, France, the Loisach in Garmisch-Partenkirchen, Germany, the Liffey in Ireland and the Teplá in Karlovy Vary, Czech Republic.
In South Africa races take place on the Trichardt Spruit, Umkomaas River, Bushmans River and As River. The As River forms part of a water exchange program between South Africa and Lesotho and is fed via a tunnel from the Katse Dam.

The 2004 World Wildwater Championships were held in Garmisch-Partenkirchen, Germany. The 2006 Championships were held from 12–17 June on the Teplá River, in the Czech Republic. The K1 men's sprint race was won by Max Hoff of Germany; the K1 men's classic was won by Kamil Mruzek of the Czech Republic. The 2008 World Championships will take place from 5–8 June in Ivrea, Italy.

== See also ==
- Canoe slalom
- Canoe Worldcup
- ICF Wildwater Canoeing World Championships
- Malabar River Festival
- Whitewater recreation in British Columbia
- Outline of canoeing and kayaking
- Canoe marathon
