= 2021 Wildwater Canoeing World Championships =

- Dates: 22 to 26 September 2021
- Host city: Bratislava, Slovakia
- Level: Senior
- Events: 9

The 2021 Wildwater Canoeing World Championships was the 37th edition of the global wildwater canoeing competition, Wildwater Canoeing World Championships, organised by the International Canoe Federation.

== Results ==
=== Men ===
==== Canoe ====
Event	Gold		Silver		Bronze	
C1	Ondřej Rolenc; Czech Republic	57.09	Quentin Dazeur; France	57.36	Charles Ferrion; France	57.36
C1 team	France; Nicolas Sauteur; Etienne Klatt; Charles Ferrion	1:00.94	Czech Republic; Ondřej Rolenc; Vladimír Slanina; Antonin Hales	1:01.08	Italy; Giacomo Bianchetti; Tommaso Mapelli; Mattia Quintarelli	1:03.58
C2	Czech Republic; Daniel Suchánek; Ondřej Rolenc	55.77	France; Stéphane Santamaria; Quentin Dazeur	55.90	France; Pierre Troubady; Hugues Moret	55.91
C2 team	France; Pierre Troubady/Hugues Moret; Ancelin Gourjault/Nicolas Sauteur; Stéphane Santamaria/Quentin Dazeur	1:02.44	Czech Republic; Daniel Suchánek/Ondřej Rolenc; Marek Rygel/Petr Veselý; Lukas Tomek/Michal Sramek	1:03.64	none awarded	

==== Kayak ====
Event	Gold		Silver		Bronze	
K1	Nejc Žnidarčič; Slovenia	51.46	Luca Barone; France	52.02	Maxence Barouh; France	52.03
K1 team	Germany; Bjoern Beerschwenger; Yannic Lemmen; Till Fengler	57.30	France; Luca Barone; Maxence Barouh; Hugues Moret	57.31	Slovenia; Nejc Žnidarčič; Anže Urankar; Simon Oven	57.88

=== Women ===
==== Canoe ====
Event	Gold		Silver		Bronze	
C1	Cecilia Panato; Italy	62.33	Tereza Kneblova; Czech Republic	62.80	Martina Satková; Czech Republic	64.51
C1 team	France; Elsa Gaubert; Laura Fontaine; Hélène Raguénès	1:09.13	none awarded			

==== Kayak ====
Event	Gold		Silver		Bronze	
K1	Lise Vinet; France	58.13	Tereza Kneblova; Czech Republic	58.27	Jil-Sophie Eckert; Germany	58.48
K1 team	Czech Republic; Barbora Dimovová; Marie Němcová; Tereza Kneblova	1:02.18	Germany; Christina Massini; Elisabeth Kostle; Jil-Sophie Eckert	1:03.02	France; Pauline Freslon; Lise Vinet; Phénicia Dupras	1:03.10

== Medal table ==
* Host nation (Slovakia)

Rank	Nation	Gold	Silver	Bronze	Total
1	France (FRA)	4	4	4	12
2	Czech Republic (CZE)	3	4	1	8
3	Germany (GER)	1	1	1	3
4	Italy (ITA)	1	0	1	2
4	Slovenia (SLO)	1	0	1	2
Totals (5 entries)		10	9	8	27
