= 2017 Wildwater Canoeing World Championships =

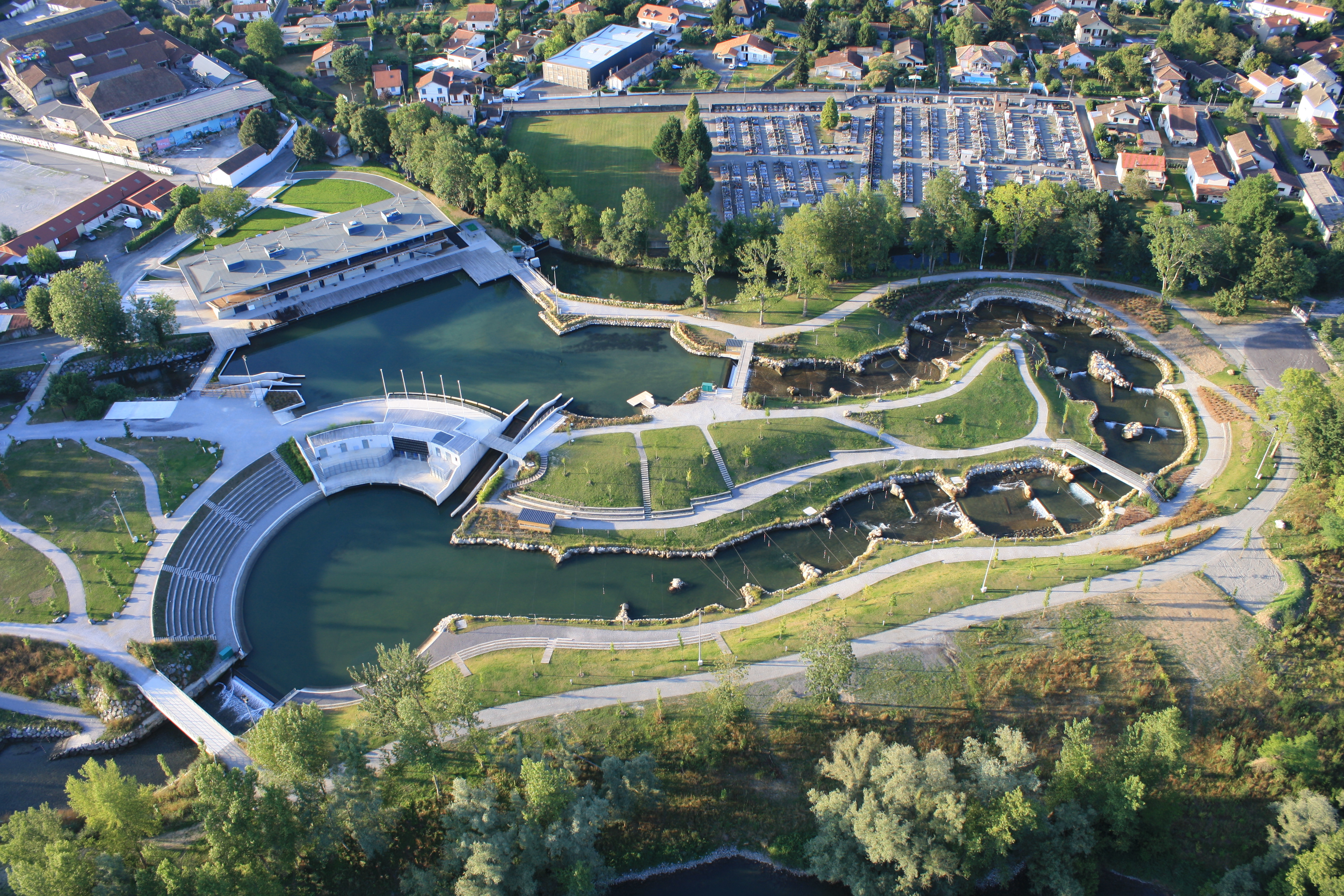
- Pau-Pyrénées Whitewater Stadium
- Host city: Pau, France
- Venue: Pau-Pyrénées Whitewater Stadium
- Level: Senior
- Events: 11

The 2017 Wildwater Canoeing World Championships was the 34th edition of the global wildwater canoeing competition, Wildwater Canoeing World Championships, organised by the International Canoe Federation.

== Results ==
=== K1 ===
==== Men ====
Rank	Athlete	Country	Time
1st place, gold medalist(s)	Anze Urankar	Slovenia	45' 95"
2nd place, silver medalist(s)	Nejc Znidarcic	Slovenia	46' 34"
3rd place, bronze medalist(s)	Gaëtan Guyonnet	France	46' 54"

==== Women ====
Rank	Athlete	Country	Time
1st place, gold medalist(s)	Claire Bren	France	51' 73"
2nd place, silver medalist(s)	Manon Hostens	France	51' 91"
3rd place, bronze medalist(s)	Hannah Brown	Great Britain	52' 37"

==== Men team ====
Rank	Athlete	Country	Time
1st place, gold medalist(s)	Paul Graton; Gaëtan Guyonnet; Clément Faure	France	49' 11"
2nd place, silver medalist(s)	Nejc Znidarcic; Simon Oven; Anze Urankar	Slovenia	49' 99"
3rd place, bronze medalist(s)	Yannic Lemmen; Bjoern Beerschwenger; Björn Barthel	Germany	50' 71"

==== Women team ====
Rank	Athlete	Country	Time
1st place, gold medalist(s)	Claire Bren; Manon Hostens; Phénicia Dupras	France	56' 51"
2nd place, silver medalist(s)	Giulia Formenton; Beatrice Grasso; Mathilde Rosa	Italy	58' 69"
3rd place, bronze medalist(s)	Sabine Fuesser; Lisa Koestle; Alke Overbeck	Germany	1h 01' 34"

=== C1 ===
==== Men ====
Rank	Athlete	Country	Time
1st place, gold medalist(s)	Ondrej Rolenc	Czech Republic	50' 29"
2nd place, silver medalist(s)	Matej Benus	Slovakia	50' 47"
3rd place, bronze medalist(s)	Blaz Cof	Slovenia	51' 26"

==== Women ====
Rank	Athlete	Country	Time
1st place, gold medalist(s)	Claire Haab	France	58' 45"
2nd place, silver medalist(s)	Martina Satkova	Czech Republic	58' 94"
3rd place, bronze medalist(s)	Marie Nemcova	Czech Republic	59' 29"

==== Men team ====
Rank	Athlete	Country	Time
1st place, gold medalist(s)	Ancelin Gourjault; Louis Lapointe; Quentin Dazeur	France	53' 50"
2nd place, silver medalist(s)	Ondrej Rolenc; Antonin Hales; Vladimir Slanina	Czech Republic	53' 57"
3rd place, bronze medalist(s)	Simeon Hocevar; Blaz Cof; Luka Zganjar	Slovenia	58' 94"

==== Women team ====
Rank	Athlete	Country	Time
1st place, gold medalist(s)	Martina Satkova; Radka Valikova; Marie Nemcova	Czech Republic	1h 06' 70"
2nd place, silver medalist(s)	Manon Durand; Claire Haab; Cindy Coat	France	1h 09' 25"
3rd place, bronze medalist(s)	Maren Lutz; Lea Sophie Barth; Sabrina Barm	Germany	1h 34' 86"

=== C2 ===
==== Men ====
Rank	Athlete	Country	Time
1st place, gold medalist(s)	Quentin Dazeur; Stéphane Santamaria	France	49' 39"
2nd place, silver medalist(s)	Tony Debray; Louis Lapointe	France	50' 01"
3rd place, bronze medalist(s)	Damien Mareau; Pierre Troubady	France	50' 79"

==== Women ====
Rank	Athlete	Country	Time
1st place, gold medalist(s)	Anezka Paloudova; Marie Nemcova	Czech Republic	59' 26"
2nd place, silver medalist(s)	Manon Durand; Cindy Coat	France	59' 67"
3rd place, bronze medalist(s)	Barbora Kortisova; Katarina Kopunova	Slovakia	1h 00' 29"

==== Men team ====
Rank	Athlete	Country	Time
1st place, gold medalist(s)	Quentin Dazeur / Stéphane Santamaria; Damien Mareau / Pierre Troubady; Louis Lapointe / Tony Debray	France	53' 18"
2nd place, silver medalist(s)	Marek Rygel / Petr Vesely; Antonin Hales / Martin Novak; Michal Sramek / Lukas Tomek	Czech Republic	56' 81"
3rd place, bronze medalist(s)	Vladi Carlo Panato / Federico Fasoli; Mattia Quintarelli / Giorgio Dell'Agostino; Paolo Razzauti / Stefano Cipressi	Italy	58' 41"

== Medal table ==
Rank	Country	1st place, gold medalist(s)	2nd place, silver medalist(s)	3rd place, bronze medalist(s)	Tot.
1	France	7	4	2	13
2	Czech Republic	3	3	1	7
3	Slovenia	1	2	2	5
4	Italy	0	1	1	2
4	Slovakia	0	1	1	2
6	Germany	0	0	3	3
7	Great Britain	0	0	1	1
Total		11	11	11	33

== See also ==
- Wildwater canoeing
