= 2018 Wildwater Canoeing World Championships =

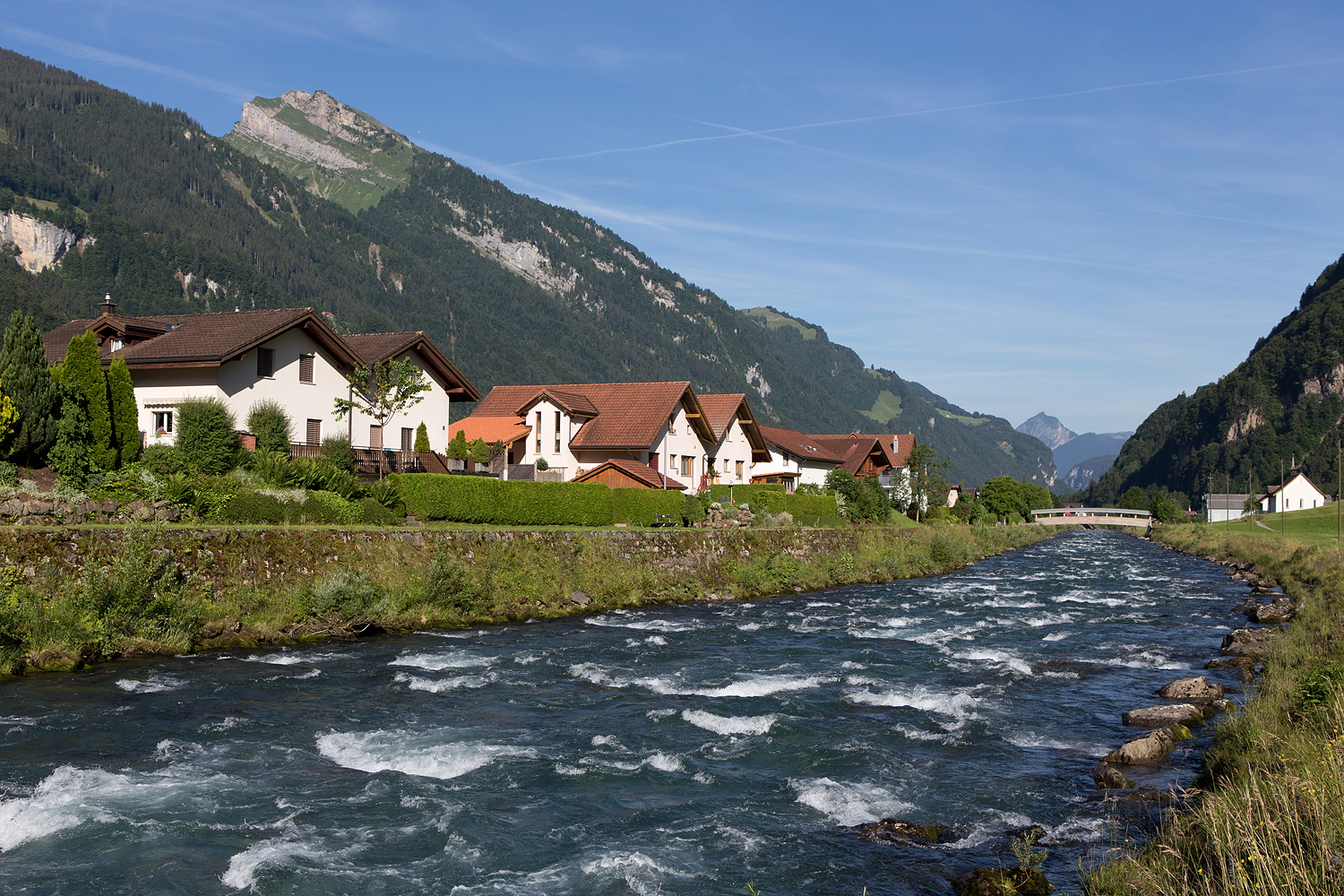
- The river Muota
- Dates: 31 May - 3 June
- Host city: Muotathal, Switzerland
- Level: Senior
- Events: 22

The 2018 Wildwater Canoeing World Championships was the 35th edition of the global wildwater canoeing competition, Wildwater Canoeing World Championships, organised by the International Canoe Federation.

== Results ==
=== Classic ===
==== K1 ====
Event	1st place, gold medalist(s)	2nd place, silver medalist(s)	3rd place, bronze medalist(s)
Individual Women	Martina Satkova; Czech Republic	Manon Hostens; France	Melanie Mathys; Switzerland
Individual Men	Simon Oven; Slovenia	Paul Jean; France	Paul Graton; France
Team women	Martina Satkova; Anezka Paloudova; Barbora Dimovova; Czech Republic	Claire Bren; Charlène Le Corvaisier; Manon Hostens; France	Melanie Mathys; Hannah Mueller; Sabine Eichenberger; Switzerland
Men team	Paul Graton; Paul Jean; Maxence Barouh; France	Adam Satke; Filip Hric; Karel Slepica; Czech Republic	Finn Hartstein; Björn Beerschwenger; Nico Paufler; Germany

==== C1 ====
Event	1st place, gold medalist(s)	2nd place, silver medalist(s)	3rd place, bronze medalist(s)
Individual Women	Martina Satkova; Czech Republic	Cecilia Panato; Italy	Maren Lutz; Germany
Individual Men	Ondrej Rolenc; Czech Republic	Louis Lapointe; France	Marek Rygel; Czech Republic
Team women	Martina Satkova; Anezka Paloudova; Marie Nemcova; Czech Republic	Alice Panato; Cecilia Panato; Marlene Ricciardi; Italy	Margot Béziat; Hélène Raguénès; Claire Haab; France
Men team	Ondrej Rolenc; Marek Rygel; Antonin Hales; Czech Republic	Norman Weber; Tim Heilinger; Janosch Sülzer; Germany	Louis Lapointe; Tony Debray; Nicolas Sauteur; France

==== C2 ====
Event	1st place, gold medalist(s)	2nd place, silver medalist(s)	3rd place, bronze medalist(s)
Women	Alice Panato; Cecilia Panato; Italy	Verena Sülzer; Maren Lutz; Germany	Hélène Raguénès; Margot Béziat; France
Men	Stéphane Santamaria; Quentin Dazeur; France	Tony Debray; Louis Lapointe; France	Ancelin Gourjault; Lucas Pazat; France
Men team	Ancelin Gourjault and Lucas Pazat; Stéphane Santamaria and Quentin Dazeur; Tony Debray and Louis Lapointe; France	Marek Rygel and Pandr Vesely; Daniel Suchanek and Ondrej Rolenc; Filip Jelinek and Vaclav Kristek; Czech Republic	Federico Urbani and Vladi Panato; Davide Maccagnan and Mattia Quintarelli; Giorgio Dell'Agostino and Andrea Bernardi; Italy

=== Sprint ===
==== K1 ====
Event	1st place, gold medalist(s)	2nd place, silver medalist(s)	3rd place, bronze medalist(s)
Individual Women	Manon Hostens; France	Martina Satkova; Czech Republic	Claire Bren; France
Individual Men	Nejc Žnidarčič; Slovenia	Vid Debeljak; Slovenia	Anze Urankar; Slovenia
Team women	Martina Satkova; Anezka Paloudova; Barbora Dimovova; Czech Republic	Claire Bren; Charlène Le Corvaisier; Manon Hostens; France	Jil-Sophie Eckert; Lisa Köstle; Sabine Füsser; Germany
Men team	Vid Debeljak; Nejc Žnidarčič; Anze Urankar; Slovenia	Paul Graton; Paul Jean; Maxence Barouh; France	Finn Hartstein; Björn Beerschwenger; Nico Paufler; Germany

==== C1 ====
Event	1st place, gold medalist(s)	2nd place, silver medalist(s)	3rd place, bronze medalist(s)
Individual Women	Cecilia Panato; Italy	Marie Nemcova; Czech Republic	Martina Satkova; Czech Republic
Individual Men	Blaz Cof; Slovenia	Marek Rygel; Czech Republic	Ondrej Rolenc; Czech Republic
Team women (not official event)	Margot Béziat; Hélène Raguénès; Claire Haab; France	Not assigned	Not assigned
Men team	Ondrej Rolenc; Marek Rygel; Vladimir Slanina; Czech Republic	Louis Lapointe; Tony Debray; Nicolas Sauteur; France	Norman Weber; Tim Heilinger; Janosch Sülzer; Germany

==== C2 ====
Event	1st place, gold medalist(s)	2nd place, silver medalist(s)	3rd place, bronze medalist(s)
Women (not official event)	Verena Sülzer; Maren Lutz; Germany	Rachel Houston; Louise Revell; Italy	Not assigned
Men	Stéphane Santamaria; Quentin Dazeur; France	Ancelin Gourjault; Lucas Pazat; France	Tony Debray; Louis Lapointe; France
Men team (not official event)	Ancelin Gourjault and Lucas Pazat; Stéphane Santamaria and Quentin Dazeur; Tony Debray and Louis Lapointe; France	Marek Rygel and Pandr Vesely; Daniel Suchanek and Ondrej Rolenc; Antonin Hales and Martin Novak; Czech Republic	Not assigned

== See also ==
- Wildwater canoeing
