= Massini =

Massini is a surname. Notable people with the surname include:

- Christina Massini (born 2002), German canoeist
- Erich Massini (1889–1915), German footballer
- Santiago Massini (1914–2003), Argentine fencer
- Stefano Massini (born 1975) Italian writer, essayist, and playwright

== See also ==
- Massoni
- Passini
