= Passoni =

Passoni is an Italian surname. Notable people with the surname include:

- Daniela Passoni, South African water polo player
- Dario Passoni (born 1974), Italian footballer
- Fabiana Passoni (born c. 1977), Brazilian singer

== See also ==
- Passini
