= Janosch Sülzer =

German canoeist

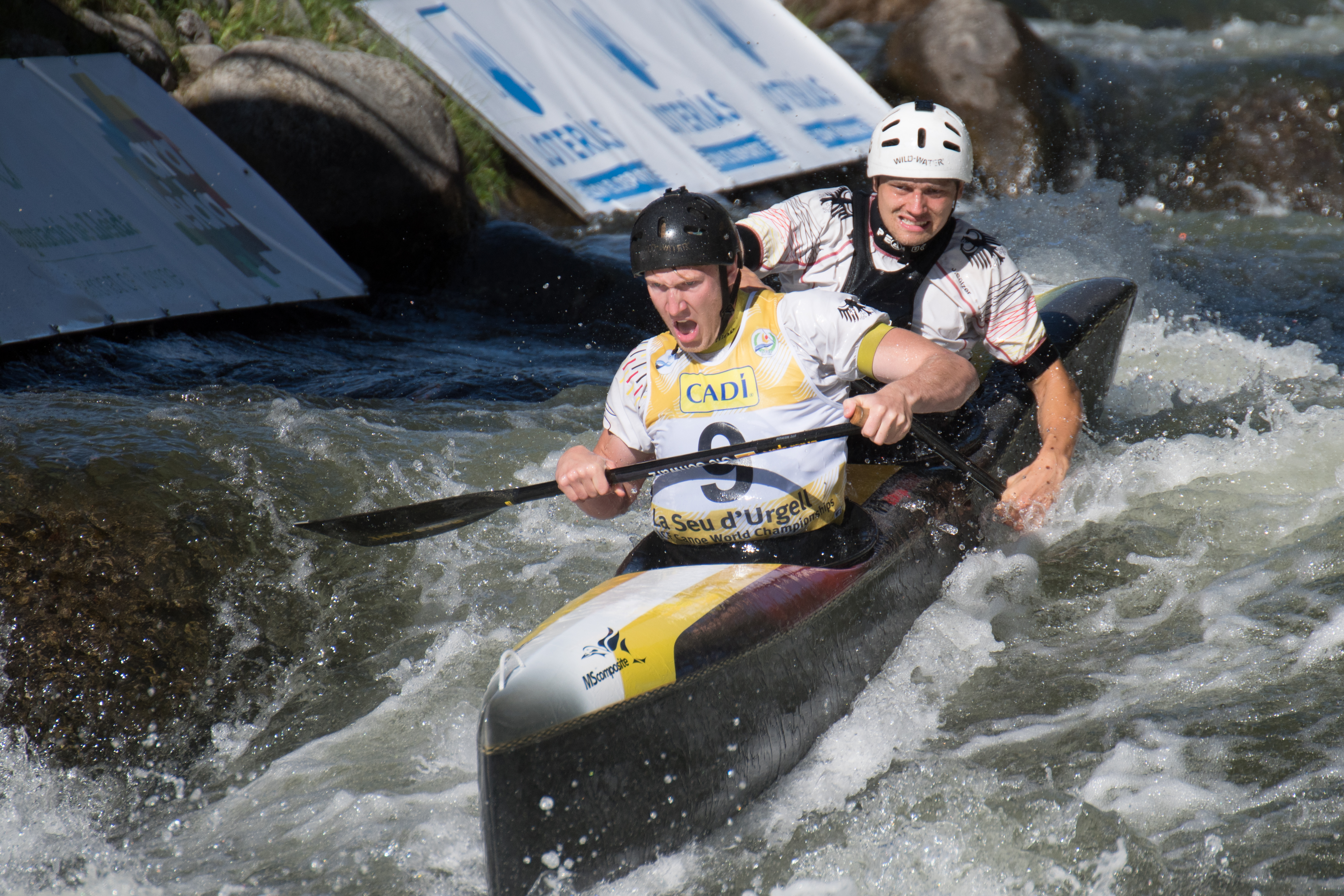
- Sülzer (with helmet) with Ole Schwarz in 2019

Personal information
- Nationality: German
- Born: 14 June 1996 (age 30) Germany

Sport
- Sport: Canoeing
- Event: Wildwater canoeing
Medal record
Event	1st	2nd	3rd
World Championships	0	3	1

Janosch Sülzer (born 14 June 1996) is a German male canoeist who won four medals at senior level at the Wildwater Canoeing World Championships.

== Medals at the World Championships ==
Senior

Year	1st place, gold medalist(s)	2nd place, silver medalist(s)	3rd place, bronze medalist(s)
2016	0	1	0
2018	0	1	1
2019	0	1	0
