= Valdenaire =

Valdenaire is a surname. Notable people with the surname include:

- Florine Valdenaire (born 1982), French snowboarder
- Mathilde Valdenaire (born 1998), French canoeist
