= Petr Veselý (canoeist) =

Czech canoeist

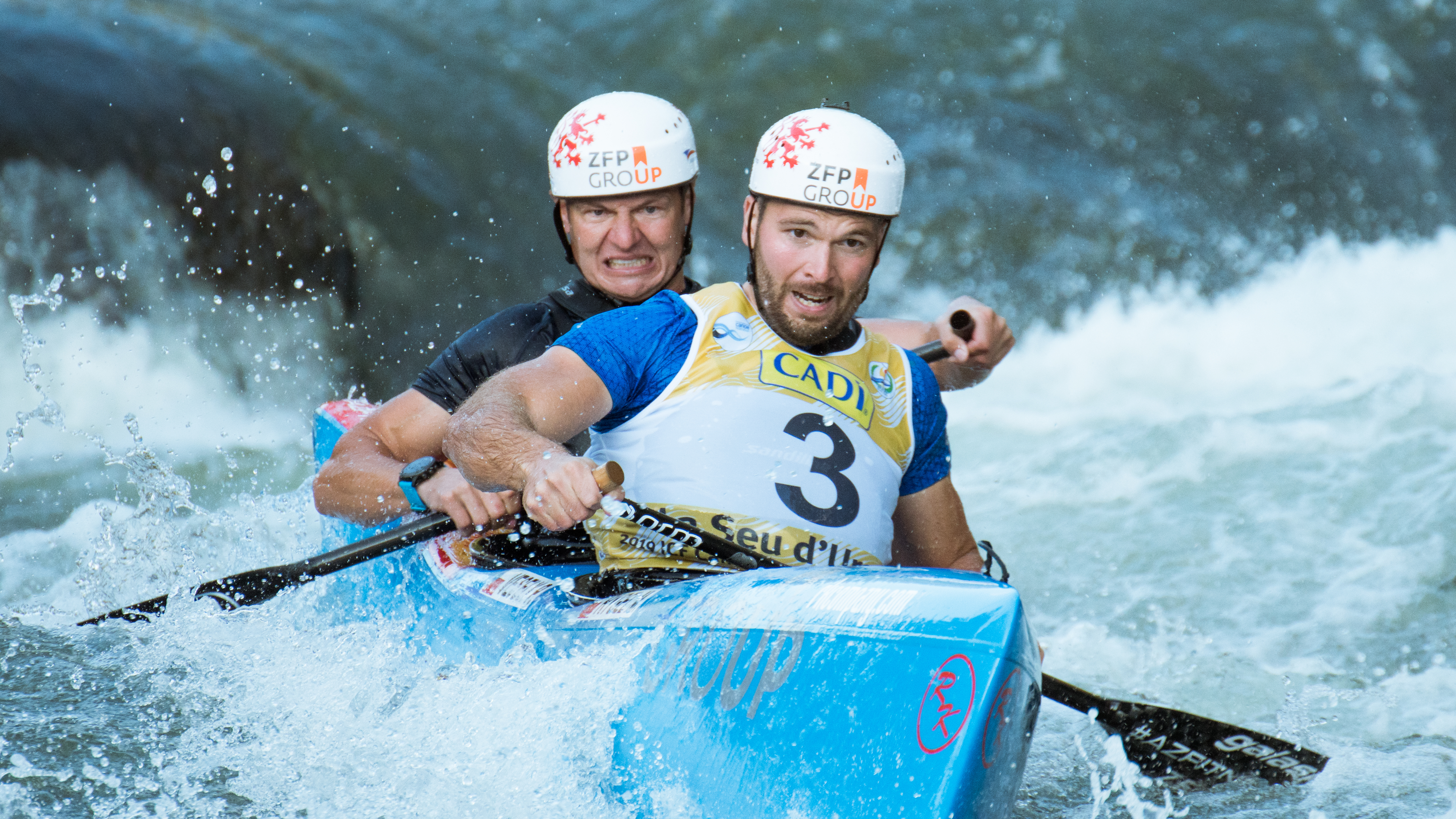
- Veselý (black jersey) with Marek Rygel in 2019

Personal information
- Nationality: Czech
- Born: 25 November 1976 (age 49) Czech Republic

Sport
- Sport: Canoeing
- Event: Wildwater canoeing
Medal record
| Event | 1st | 2nd | 3rd |
|---|---|---|---|
| World Championships | 2 | 6 | 5 |

Petr Veselý (born 25 November 1976) is a Czech male canoeist who won 13 medals at senior level at the Wildwater Canoeing World Championships.

== Medals at the World Championships ==
Senior

| Year | 1st place, gold medalist(s) | 2nd place, silver medalist(s) | 3rd place, bronze medalist(s) |
|---|---|---|---|
| 2013 | 0 | 0 | 1 |
| 2014 | 1 | 1 | 2 |
| 2015 | 0 | 1 | 0 |
| 2016 | 1 | 0 | 0 |
| 2017 | 0 | 1 | 0 |
| 2018 | 0 | 2 | 1 |
| 2019 | 0 | 1 | 1 |
