= Passini =

Passini is a surname. Notable people with the surname include:

- Ludovico Passini (1832–1902), Austrian-Italian painter
- Ludwig Passini (1832–1903), American painter and printmaker

== See also ==
- Massini
- Passoni
