= Finn Hartstein =

German canoeist

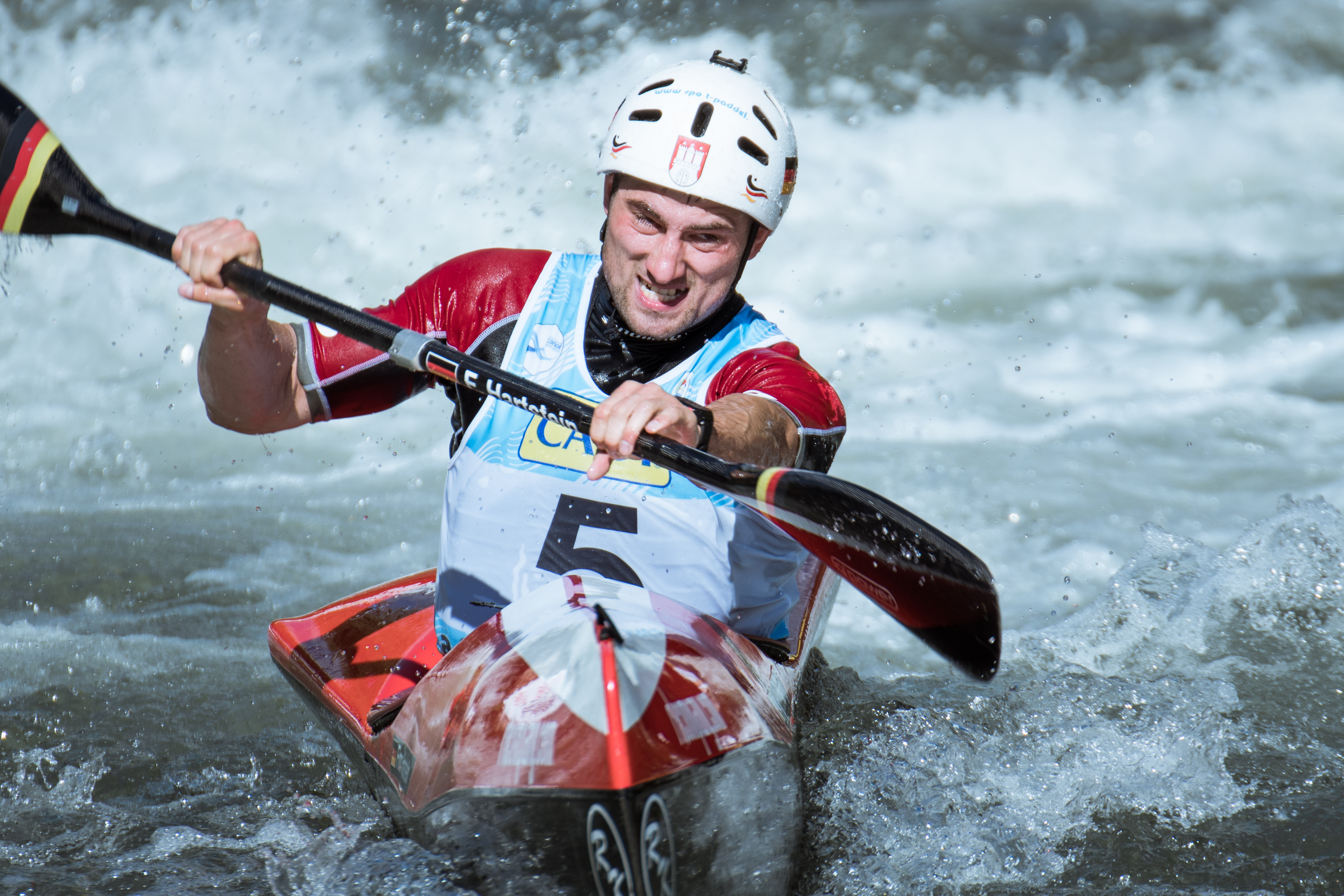
- Hartstein in 2019

Personal information
- Nationality: German
- Born: 28 October 1995 (age 30) Germany

Sport
- Sport: Canoeing
- Event: Wildwater canoeing
- Club: Oberalster VfW Hamburg
Medal record
Event	1st	2nd	3rd
World Championships	0	2	2
European Championships	1	2	1
Total	1	4	3

Finn Hartstein (born 28 October 1995) is a German male canoeist who won three medals at senior level at the Wildwater Canoeing World Championships.

== Medals at the World Championships ==
Senior

Year	1st place, gold medalist(s)	2nd place, silver medalist(s)	3rd place, bronze medalist(s)
2018	0	0	2
2019	0	1	0
2022	0	1	0

== Medals at the European Championships ==
Senior

Year	1st place, gold medalist(s)	2nd place, silver medalist(s)	3rd place, bronze medalist(s)
2017	0	1	0
2021	1	1	1
