= Maren Lutz =

German canoeist

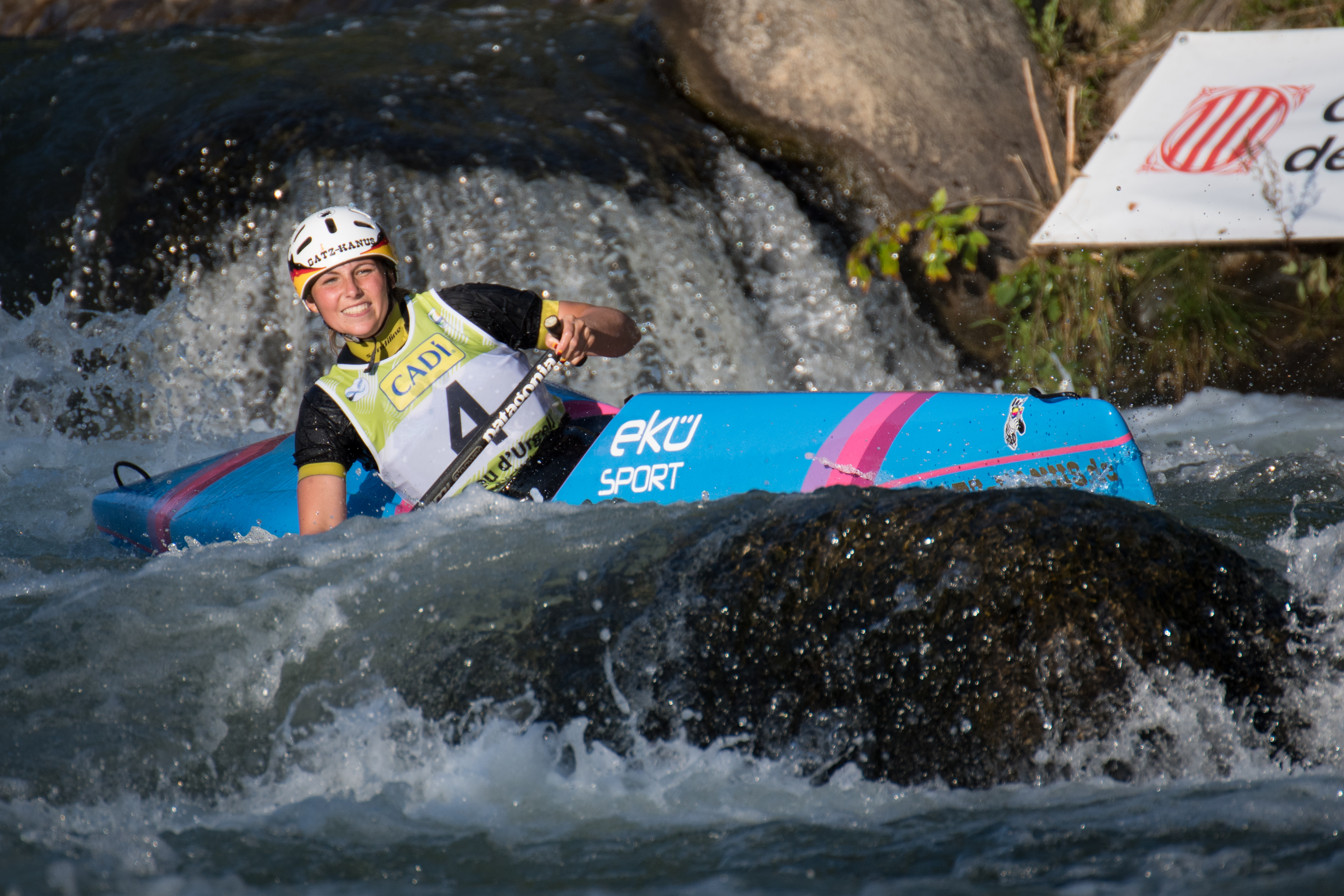
- Lutz in 2019

Personal information
- Nationality: German
- Born: 31 March 1999 (age 27) Germany

Sport
- Sport: Canoeing
- Event: Wildwater canoeing
Medal record
Event	1st	2nd	3rd
World Championships	0	1	4

Maren Lutz (born 31 March 1999) is a German female canoeist who won five medals at senior level at the Wildwater Canoeing World Championships.

== Medals at the World Championships ==
Senior

Year	1st place, gold medalist(s)	2nd place, silver medalist(s)	3rd place, bronze medalist(s)
2017	0	0	1
2018	0	1	1
2019	0	0	2
