= 2019 Wildwater Canoeing World Championships =

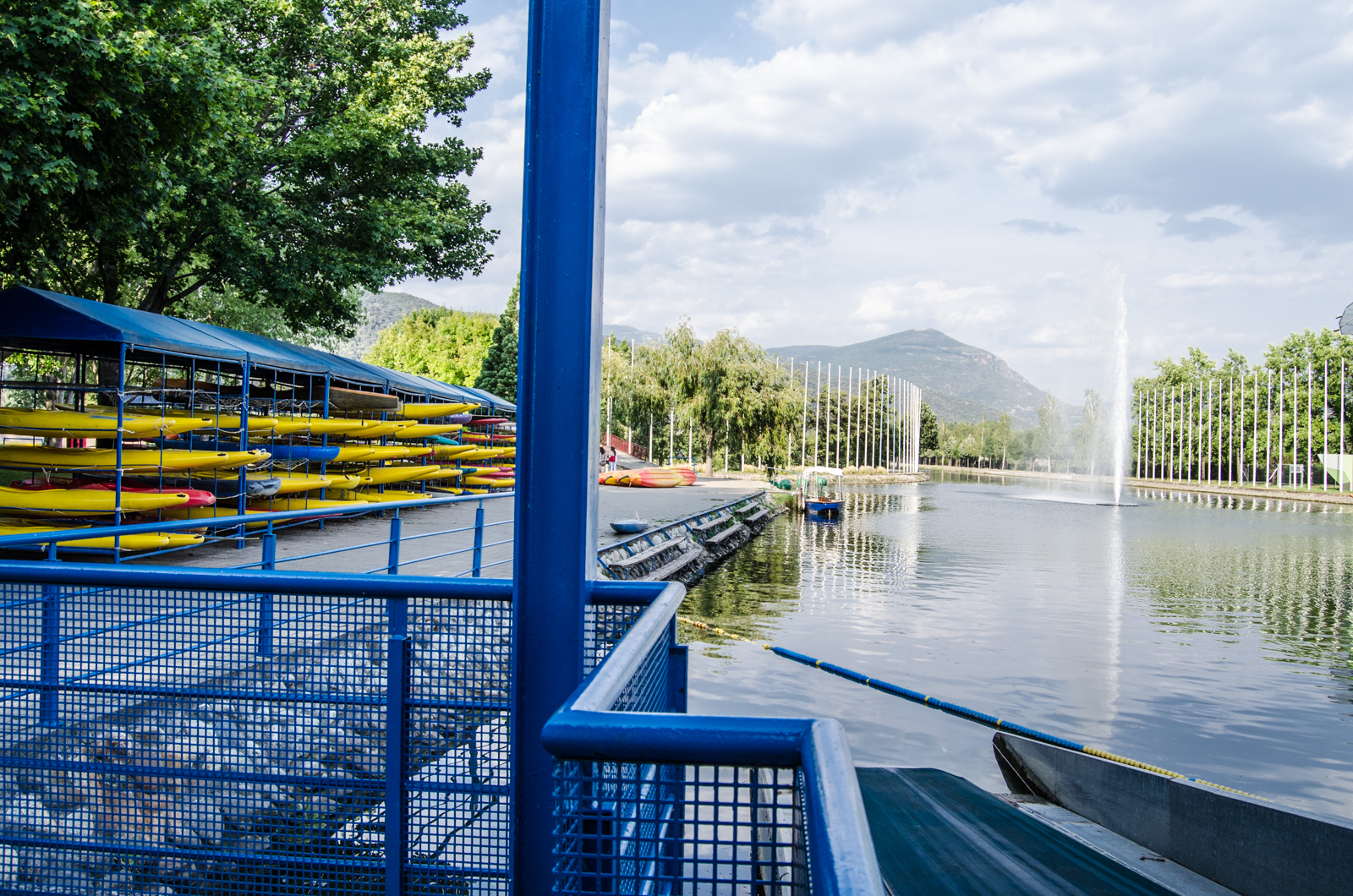
- Parc Olímpic del Segre
- Dates: 25 - 29 September
- Host city: La Seu d'Urgell, Spain
- Level: Senior
- Events: 11

The 2019 Wildwater Canoeing World Championships was the 36th edition of the global wildwater canoeing competition, Wildwater Canoeing World Championships, organised by the International Canoe Federation.

== Results ==
=== Sprint ===
==== K1 ====
Event	1st place, gold medalist(s)	2nd place, silver medalist(s)	3rd place, bronze medalist(s)
Individual Women	Phénicia Dupras; France	Anežka Paloudová; Czech Republic	Barbora Dimovová; Czech Republic
Individual Men	Nejc Žnidarčič; Slovenia	Félix Bouvet; France	Hugues Moret; France
Team Women	Anežka Paloudová; Martina Satková; Barbora Dimovová; Czech Republic	Lise Vinet; Phénicia Dupras; Mathilde Valdenaire; France	Meghan Jaedicke; Sabine Fuesser; Jil-Sophie Eckert; Germany
Team Men	Nejc Žnidarčič; Anže Urankar; Simon Oven; Slovenia	Félix Bouvet; Hugues Moret; Maxence Barouh; France	Adam Satke; Filip Hric; Vojtěch Zapletal; Czech Republic

==== C1 ====
Event	1st place, gold medalist(s)	2nd place, silver medalist(s)	3rd place, bronze medalist(s)
Individual Women	Martina Satková; Czech Republic	Cecilia Panato; Italy	Elsa Gaubert; France
Individual Men	Louis Lapointe; France	Ondřej Rolenc; Czech Republic	Vladimír Slanina; Czech Republic
Team Women	Elsa Gaubert; Hélène Raguénès; Margot Béziat; France	Martina Satková; Marie Němcová; Anežka Paloudová; Czech Republic	Maren Lutz; Sabrina Barm; Lea Sophie Barth; Germany
Team Men	Louis Lapointe; Tony Debray; Quentin Dazeur; France	Vladimír Slanina; Ondřej Rolenc; Marek Rygel; Czech Republic	Igor Gojić; Luka Obadić; Ivan Tolić; Croatia

==== C2 ====
Event	1st place, gold medalist(s)	2nd place, silver medalist(s)	3rd place, bronze medalist(s)
Women	Elsa Gaubert; Margot Béziat; France	Marlene Ricciardi; Cecilia Panato; Italy	Maren Lutz; Sabrina Barm; Germany
Men	Louis Lapointe; Tony Debray; France	Marek Rygel; Petr Veselý; Czech Republic	Stéphane Santamaria; Quentin Dazeur; France
Team Men	Louis Lapointe, Tony Debray; Stéphane Santamaria, Quentin Dazeur; Ancelin Gourjault, Lucas Pazat; France	Finn Hartstein, Janosch Sülzer; Normen Weber, René Brücker; Ole Schwarz, Yannic Lemmen; Germany	Marek Rygel, Petr Veselý; Daniel Suchánek, Ondřej Rolenc; Vladimír Slanina, Vladimír Sen Slanina; Czech Republic

== See also ==
- Wildwater canoeing
