= Daniel Suchánek =

Czech canoeist

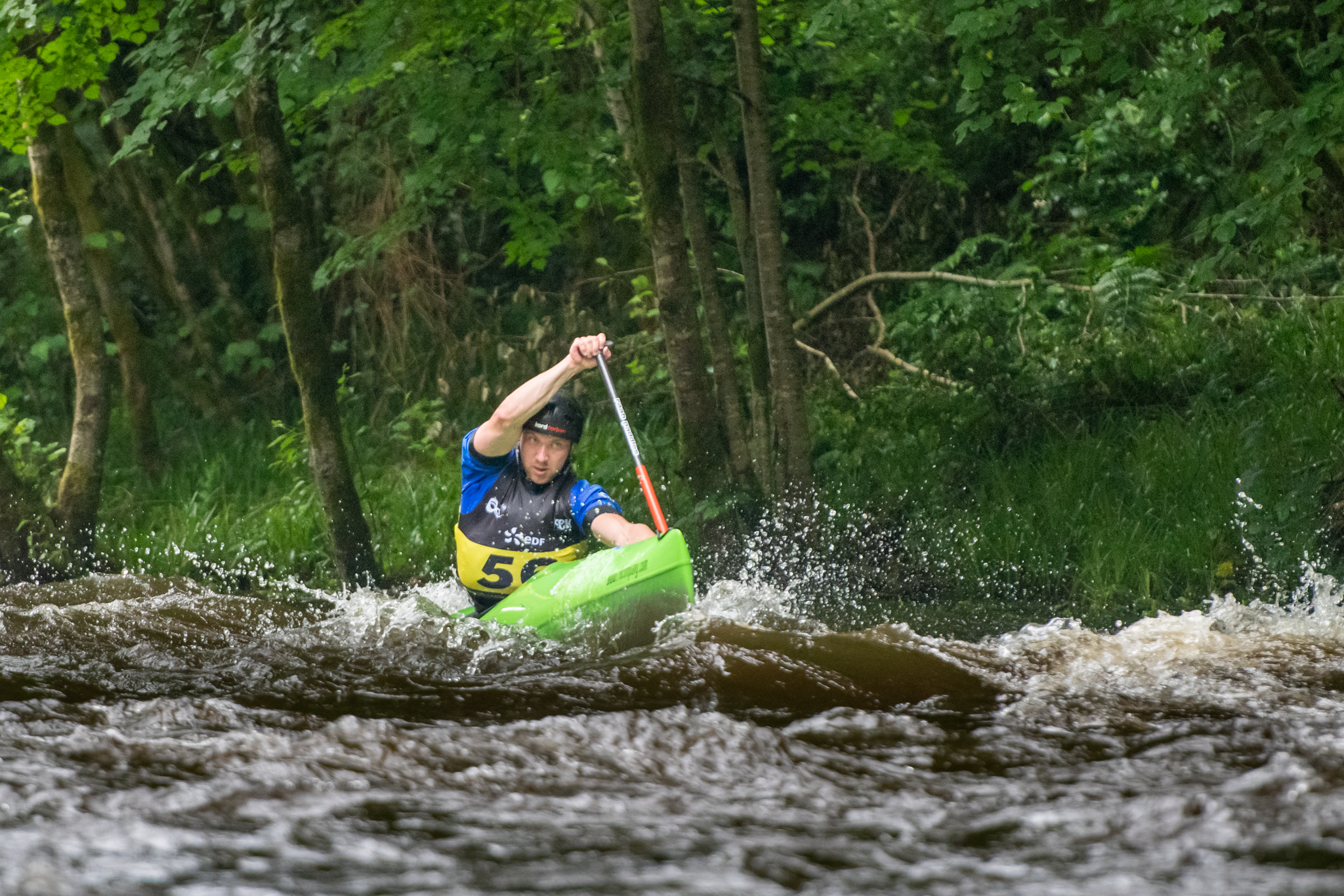
- Daniel Suchánek during 2022 WC in Treignac

Personal information
- Nationality: Czech
- Born: 21 June 1993 (age 33) Czech Republic
- Height: 172 cm (5 ft 8 in)
- Weight: 78 kg (172 lb)

Sport
- Sport: Canoeing
- Event: Wildwater canoeing
- Club: Sportovní klub kanoistiky Vysoké Mýto
- Coached by: Luděk Roleček, Jan Šťastný
Medal record
Event	1st	2nd	3rd
World Championships	2	5	2
European Championships	3	3	5

Daniel Suchánek (born 21 June 1993) is a Czech male canoeist who won nine medals at senior level at the Wildwater Canoeing World Championships.

== Medals at the World Championships ==
Senior

Year	1st place, gold medalist(s)	2nd place, silver medalist(s)	3rd place, bronze medalist(s)
2018	0	1	0
2019	0	0	1
2021	1	0	0
2022	0	1	1
2023	1	0	0
2024	0	3	0

Junior

Year	1st place, gold medalist(s)	2nd place, silver medalist(s)	3rd place, bronze medalist(s)
2009	0	0	1
2011	0	1	2

== Medals at the European Championships ==
Senior

Year	1st place, gold medalist(s)	2nd place, silver medalist(s)	3rd place, bronze medalist(s)
2011	0	0	1
2013	0	0	1
2015	0	1	1
2017	2	1	0
2019	1	0	1
2021	0	1	1

Junior

Year	1st place, gold medalist(s)	2nd place, silver medalist(s)	3rd place, bronze medalist(s)
2010	0	1	0
