= Félix Bouvet =

French canoeist

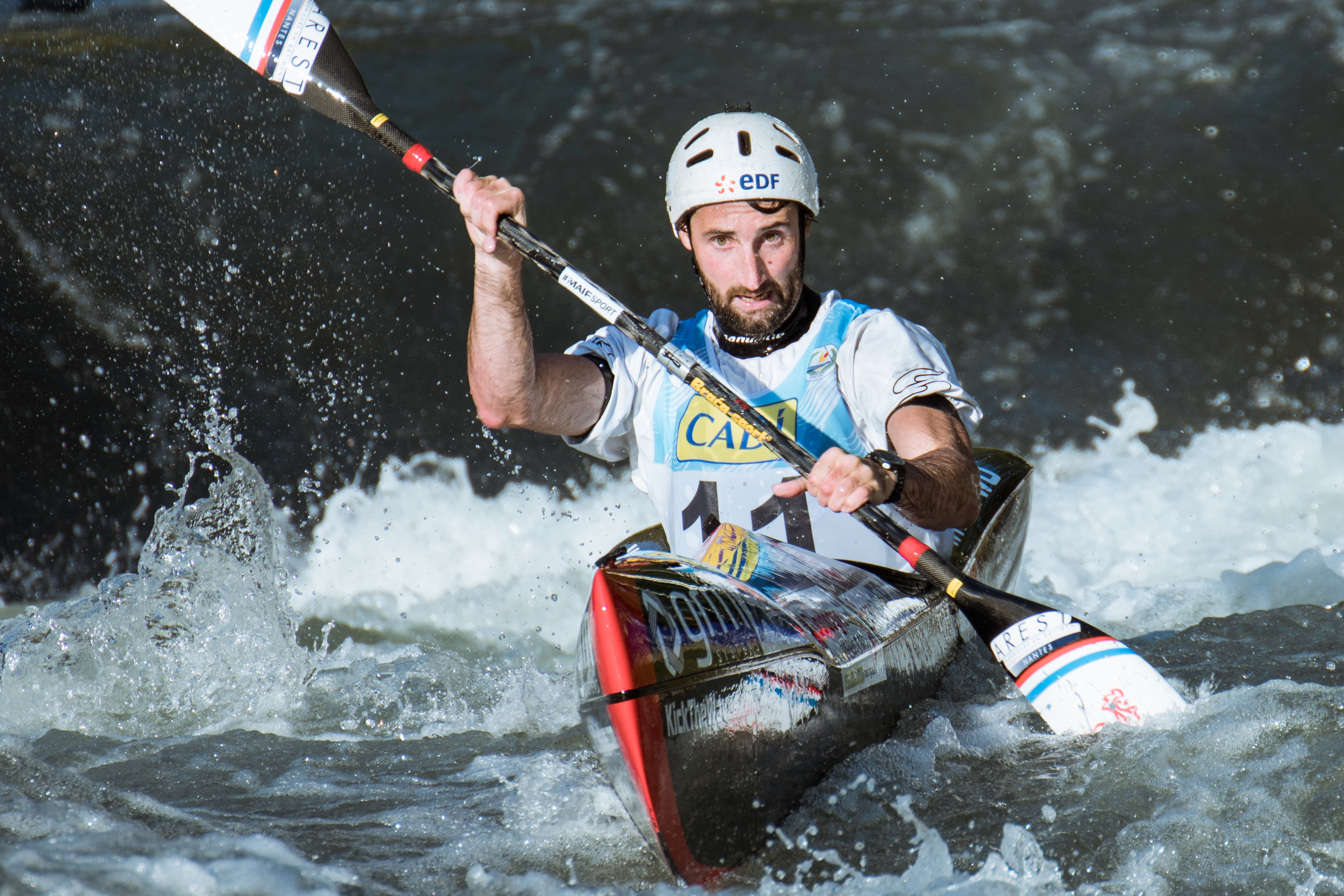
- Bouvet in 2019

Personal information
- Nationality: French
- Born: 16 June 1991 (age 35) France

Sport
- Sport: Canoeing
- Event: Wildwater canoeing
Medal record
Event	1st	2nd	3rd
World Championships	0	2	0

Félix Bouvet (born 16 June 1991) is a French male canoeist who won two medals at senior level at the Wildwater Canoeing World Championships.

He won two editions of the Wildwater Canoeing World Cup in K1.

== Medals at the World Championships ==
Senior

Year	1st place, gold medalist(s)	2nd place, silver medalist(s)	3rd place, bronze medalist(s)
2019	0	2	0
