= Tony Debray =

French canoeist

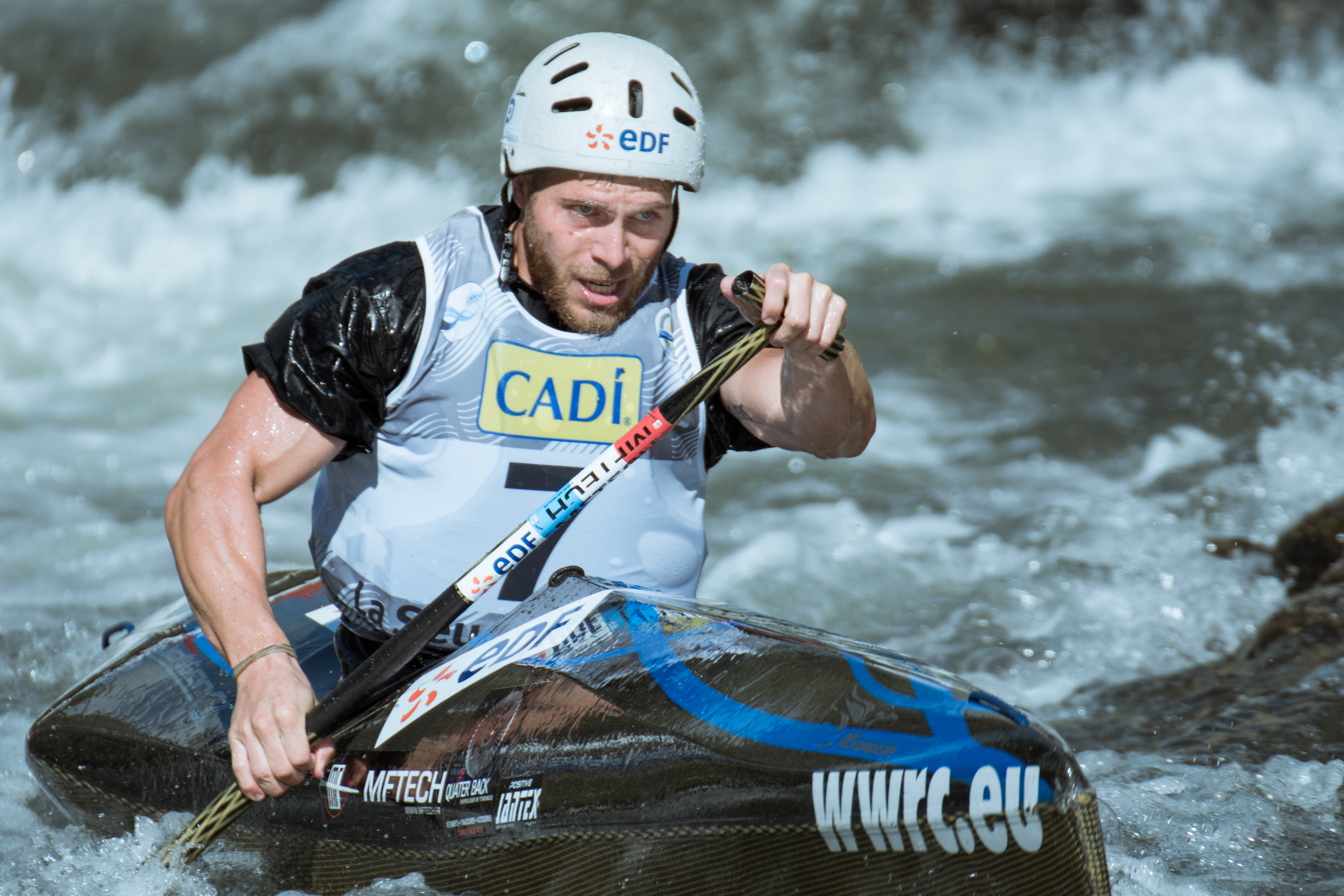
- Debray in 2019

Personal information
- Nationality: French
- Born: 13 November 1989 (age 36) France

Sport
- Sport: Canoeing
- Event: Wildwater canoeing
Medal record
Event	1st	2nd	3rd
World Championships	10	5	5

Tony Debray (born 13 November 1989) is a French male canoeist who won 20 medals at senior level at the Wildwater Canoeing World Championships.

== Medals at the World Championships ==
Senior

Year	1st place, gold medalist(s)	2nd place, silver medalist(s)	3rd place, bronze medalist(s)
2014	2	1	0
2015	1	0	0
2016	2	1	3
2017	1	1	0
2018	1	2	2
2019	3	0	0
