= Adam Satke =

Czech canoeist

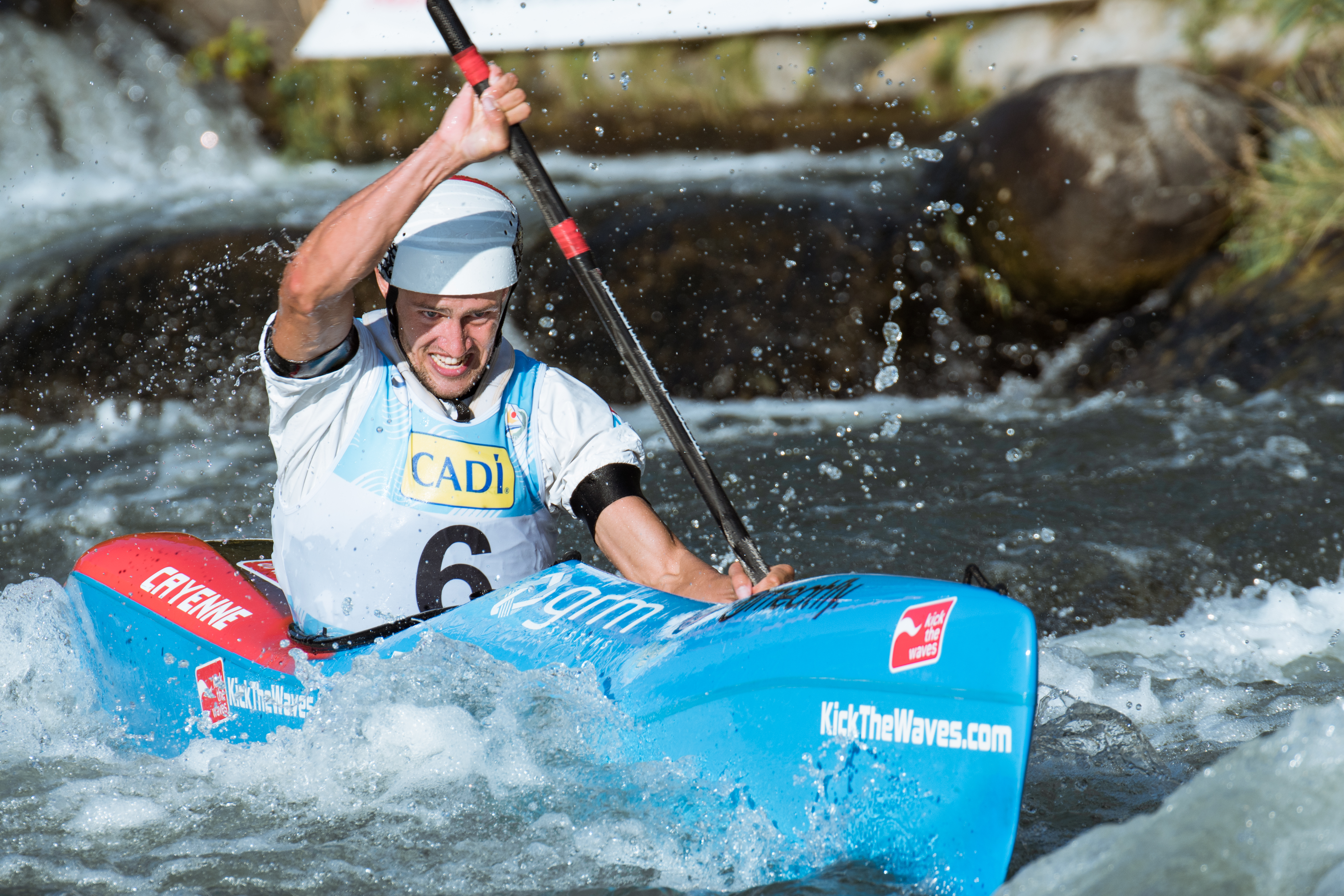
- Satke in 2019

Personal information
- Nationality: Czech
- Born: 26 October 1994 (age 31) Czech Republic

Sport
- Sport: Canoeing
- Event: Wildwater canoeing
Medal record
Event	1st	2nd	3rd
World Championships	1	1	2

Adam Satke (born 26 October 1994) is a Czech male canoeist who won four medals at senior level at the Wildwater Canoeing World Championships.

== Medals at the World Championships ==
Senior

Year	1st place, gold medalist(s)	2nd place, silver medalist(s)	3rd place, bronze medalist(s)
2018	0	1	0
2019	0	0	1
2022	1	0	1
