= Meghan Jaedicke =

German canoeist

Personal information
- Nationality: German
- Born: 23 April 1997 (age 29) Germany

Sport
- Sport: Canoeing
- Event: Wildwater canoeing
Medal record
Event	1st	2nd	3rd
World Championships	0	0	1

Meghan Jaedick (born 23 April 1997) is a German female canoeist who a three medal at senior level at the Wildwater Canoeing World Championships.

== Medals at the World Championships ==
Senior

Year	1st place, gold medalist(s)	2nd place, silver medalist(s)	3rd place, bronze medalist(s)
2019	0	0	1
