= Margot Béziat =

French canoeist

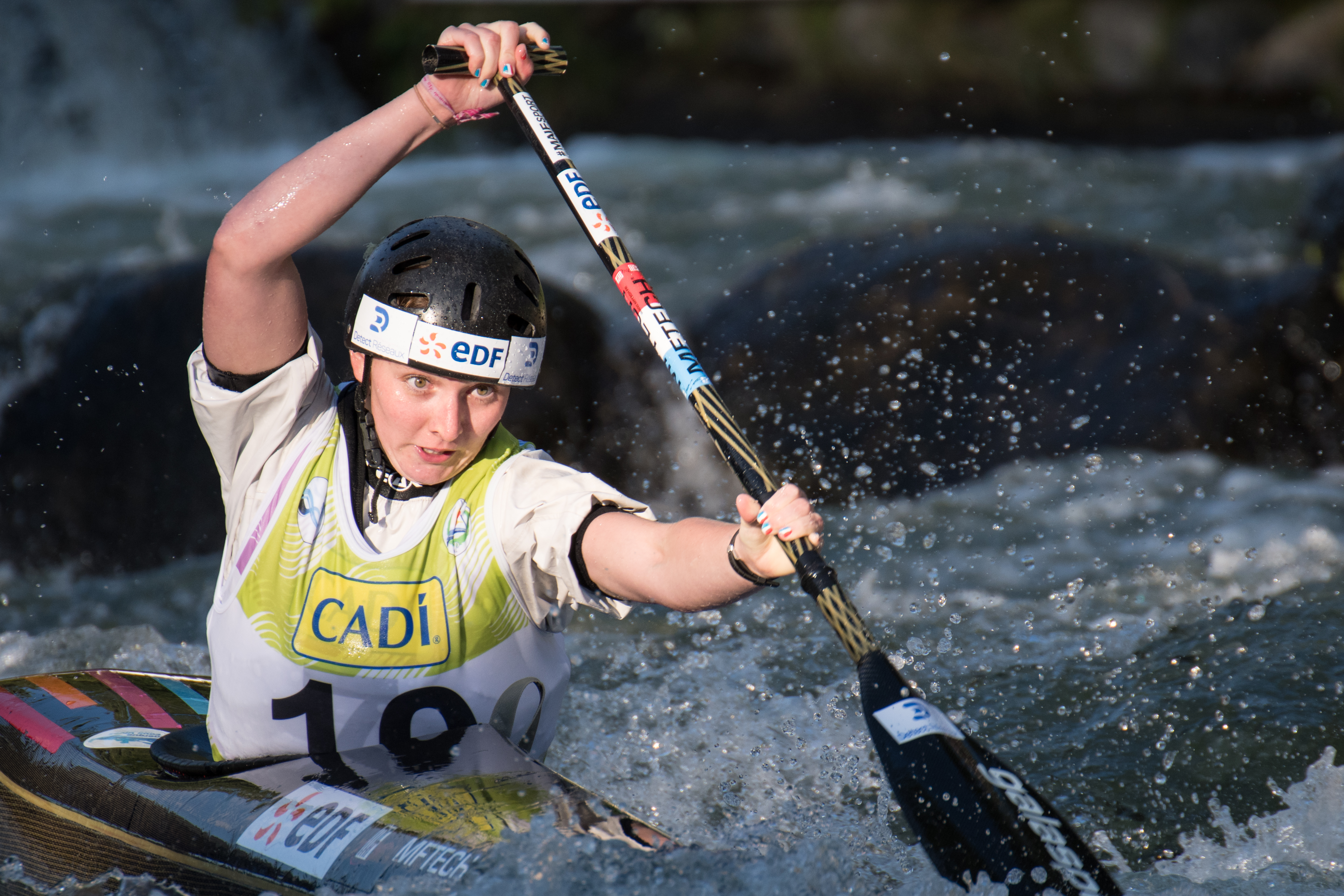
- Béziat in 2019

Personal information
- Nationality: French
- Born: 30 July 2001 (age 25) France

Sport
- Sport: Canoeing
- Event: Wildwater canoeing
- Club: Ckc Vallée de l'Ain Catégorie
Medal record
| Event | 1st | 2nd | 3rd |
|---|---|---|---|
| World Championships | 2 | 0 | 2 |

Margot Béziat (French: [maʁɡo bezja]; born 30 July 2001) is a French female canoeist who won four medals at senior level at the Wildwater Canoeing World Championships.

== Medals at the World Championships ==
Senior

| Year | 1st place, gold medalist(s) | 2nd place, silver medalist(s) | 3rd place, bronze medalist(s) |
|---|---|---|---|
| 2018 | 0 | 0 | 2 |
| 2019 | 2 | 0 | 0 |
