= Barbora Dimovová =

Czech canoeist

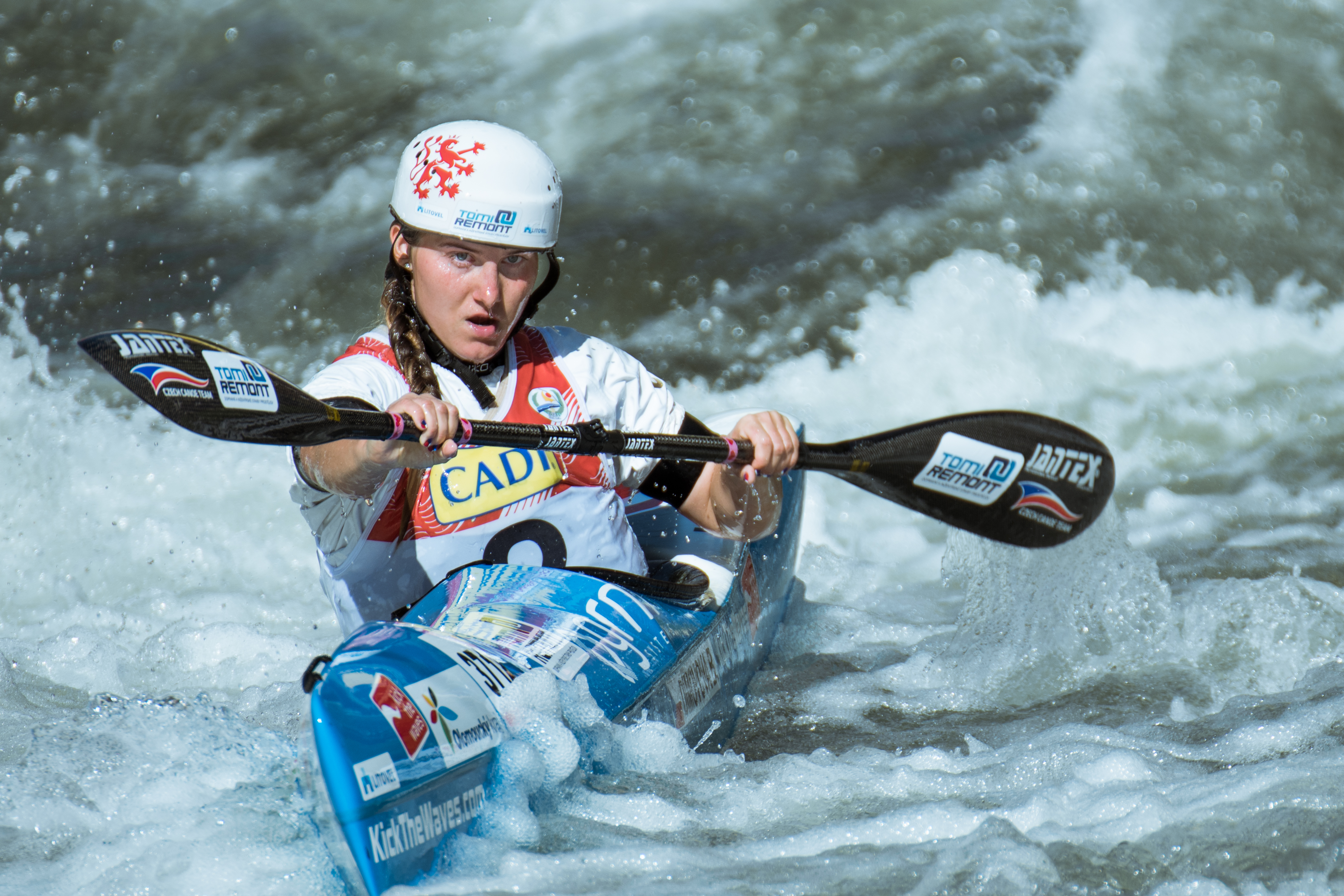
- Dimovová in 2019

Personal information
- Nationality: Czech
- Born: 18 October 2000 (age 25) Czech Republic

Sport
- Sport: Canoeing
- Event: Wildwater canoeing
Medal record
Event	1st	2nd	3rd
World Championships	4	0	1

Barbora Dimovová (born 18 October 2000) is a Czech female canoeist who won five medals at senior level at the Wildwater Canoeing World Championships.

== Medals at the World Championships ==
Senior

Year	1st place, gold medalist(s)	2nd place, silver medalist(s)	3rd place, bronze medalist(s)
2017	1	0	0
2018	2	0	0
2019	1	0	1
