= Louis Lapointe =

French canoeist

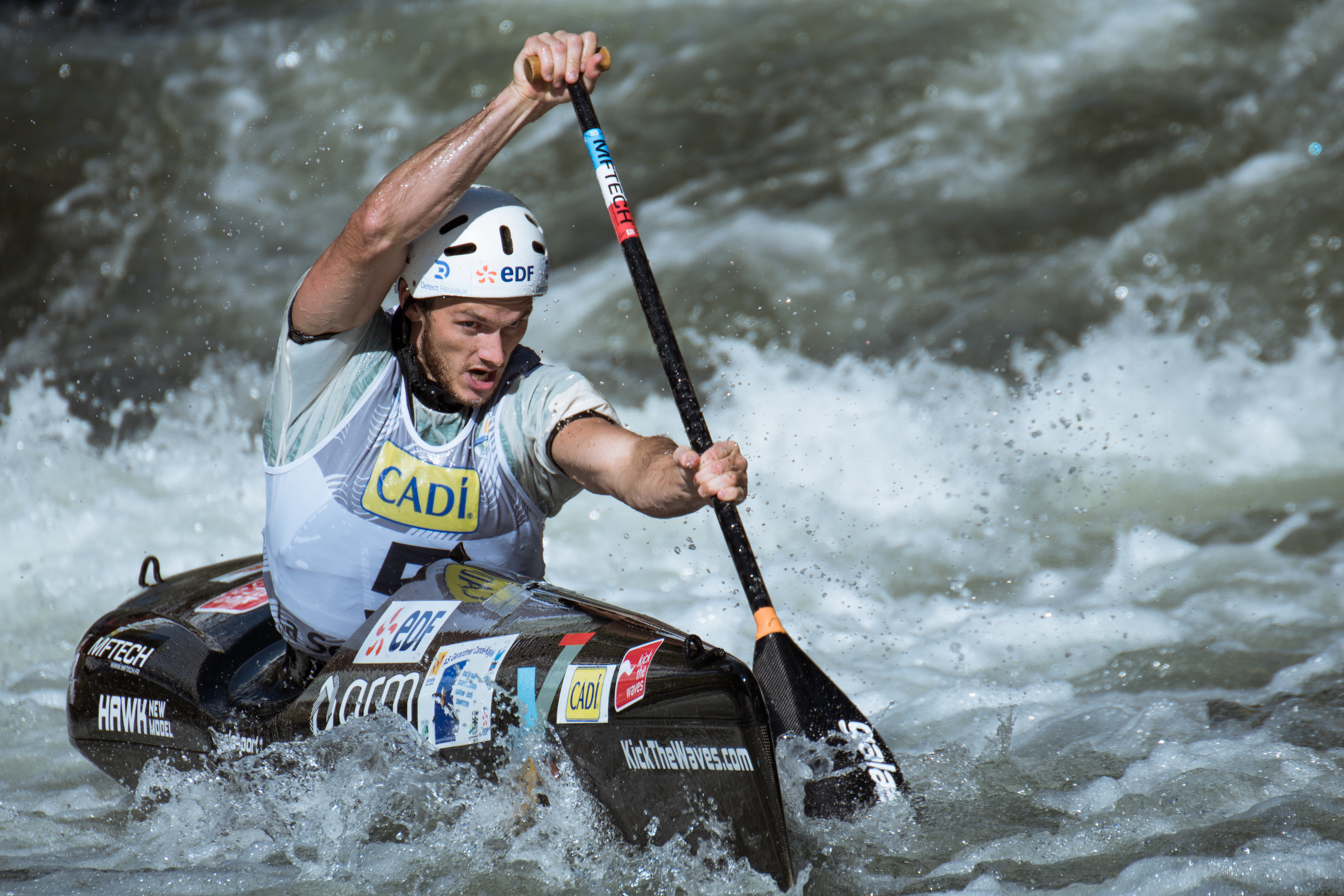
- Lapointe in 2019

Personal information
- Nationality: French
- Born: 15 April 1992 (age 34) Épinal, France
- Height: 1.76 m (5 ft 9 in)
- Weight: 72 kg (159 lb)

Sport
- Sport: Canoeing
- Event: Wildwater canoeing
Medal record
Event	1st	2nd	3rd
World Championships	15	7	4
European Championships	4	5	1
Total	19	12	5

Louis Lapointe (born 15 April 1992) is a French male canoeist who won 26 medals at senior level at the Wildwater Canoeing World Championships.

He won a Wildwater Canoeing World Cup in C1.

== Medals at the World Championships ==
Of his 26 medals at the world championships, 9 were at individual level and 17 at team level.

Senior

Year	Individual												Team												Tot.		
Year	C1 classic			C1 sprint			C2 classic			C2 sprint			C1 classic			C1 sprint			C2 classic			C2 sprint			Tot.		
Year	1st place, gold medalist(s)	2nd place, silver medalist(s)	3rd place, bronze medalist(s)	1st place, gold medalist(s)	2nd place, silver medalist(s)	3rd place, bronze medalist(s)	1st place, gold medalist(s)	2nd place, silver medalist(s)	3rd place, bronze medalist(s)	1st place, gold medalist(s)	2nd place, silver medalist(s)	3rd place, bronze medalist(s)	1st place, gold medalist(s)	2nd place, silver medalist(s)	3rd place, bronze medalist(s)	1st place, gold medalist(s)	2nd place, silver medalist(s)	3rd place, bronze medalist(s)	1st place, gold medalist(s)	2nd place, silver medalist(s)	3rd place, bronze medalist(s)	1st place, gold medalist(s)	2nd place, silver medalist(s)	3rd place, bronze medalist(s)	1st place, gold medalist(s)	2nd place, silver medalist(s)	3rd place, bronze medalist(s)
2014	0	0	0	0	0	0	0	1	0	0	0	0	1	0	0	1	0	0	1	0	0	1	0	0	4	1	0
2015				0	0	0				0	0	0				0	0	0				1	0	0	1	0	0
2016	0	0	0	0	0	0	1	0	0	0	0	1	0	0	1	0	1	0	0	1	0	1	0	0	2	2	2
2017				0	0	0				0	1	0				1	0	0				1	0	0	2	1	0
2018	0	1	0	0	0	0	0	1	0	0	0	1	0	0	1	0	1	0	1	0	0	1	0	0	2	3	2
2019				1	0	0				1	0	0				1	0	0				1	0	0	4	0	0
Tot.	0	1	0	1	0	0	1	2	0	1	1	2	1	0	2	3	2	0	2	1	0	6	0	0	15	7	4
