= Ancelin Gourjault =

French canoeist

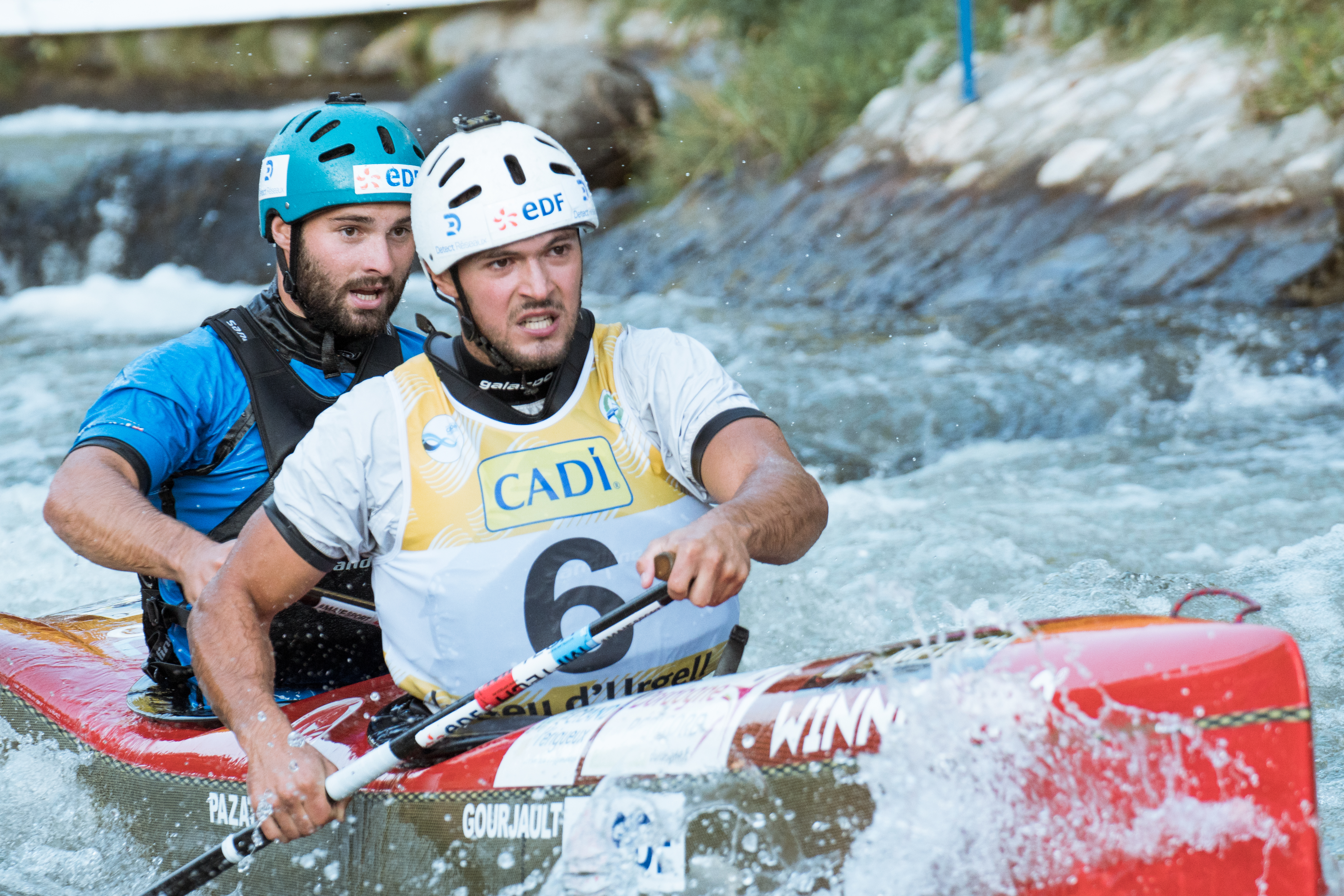
- Gourjault (white helmet) with Lucas Pazat in 2019

Personal information
- Nationality: French
- Born: 31 October 1996 (age 29) France

Sport
- Sport: Canoeing
- Event: Wildwater canoeing
Medal record
Event	1st	2nd	3rd
World Championships	4	1	1

Ancelin Gourjault (born 31 October 1996) is a French male canoeist who won six medals at senior level at the Wildwater Canoeing World Championships.

== Medals at the World Championships ==
Senior

Year	1st place, gold medalist(s)	2nd place, silver medalist(s)	3rd place, bronze medalist(s)
2017	1	0	0
2018	2	1	1
2019	1	0	0
