= Sabrina Barm =

German canoeist (born 1987)

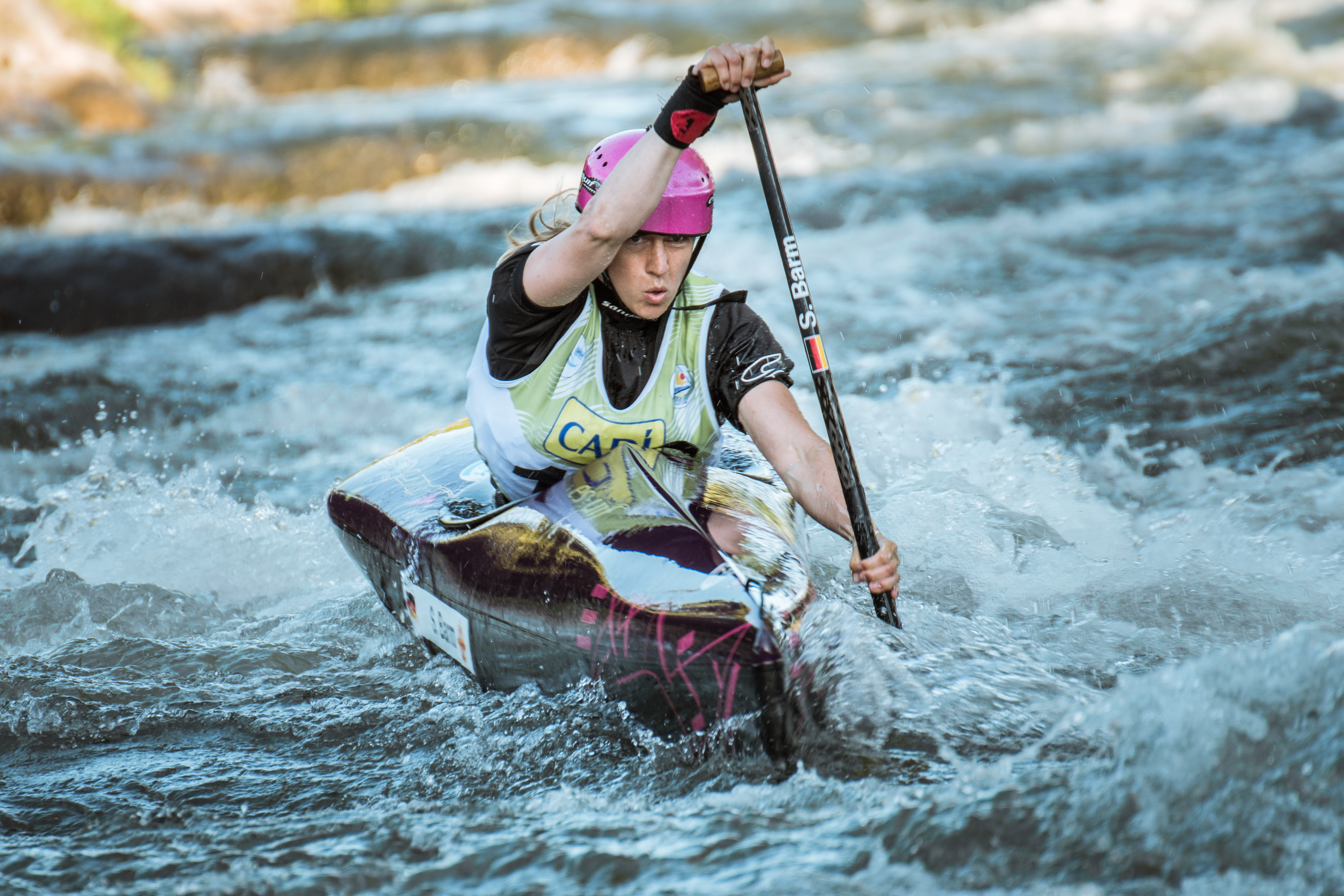
- Barm in 2019

Personal information
- Nationality: German
- Born: 2 March 1987 (age 39) Germany

Sport
- Sport: Canoeing
- Event: Wildwater canoeing
Medal record
Event	1st	2nd	3rd
World Championships	0	0	3

Sabrina Barm (born 2 March 1987) is a German female canoeist who won three medals at senior level at the Wildwater Canoeing World Championships. She is one of only 12 women in the world who finished the kayak track of the world`s toughest team relay race Red Bull Dolomitenmann .

== Medals at the World Championships ==
Senior

Year	1st place, gold medalist(s)	2nd place, silver medalist(s)	3rd place, bronze medalist(s)
2017	0	0	1
2019	0	0	2
