= Anže Urankar =

Slovenian canoeist

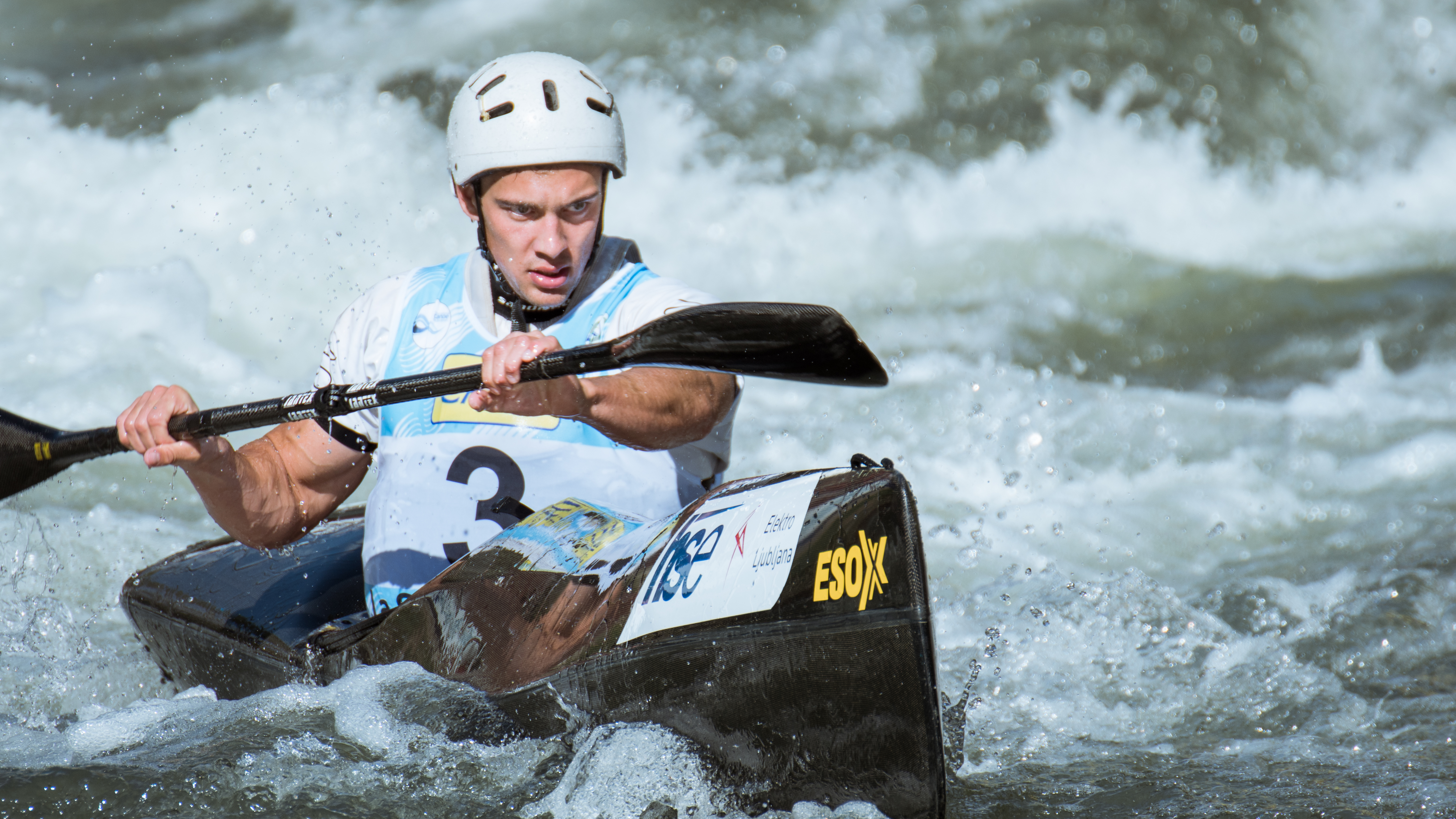

Personal information
- Nationality: Urankar
- Born: 17 January 1997 (age 29) Slovenia

Sport
- Sport: Canoeing
- Event: Wildwater canoeing
Medal record
Representing Slovenia
Men's wildwater canoeing
Event / 1st / 2nd / 3rd; World Championships / 5 / 2 / 2
Men's canoe sprint
World Championships
Bronze medal – third place	2024 Samarkand	K-4 Mix 500 m

Anze Urankar (born 17 January 1997) is a Slovenian male canoeist who won nine medals at senior level at the Wildwater Canoeing World Championships.

== Medals at the World Championships ==
Senior

Year	1st place, gold medalist(s)	2nd place, silver medalist(s)	3rd place, bronze medalist(s)
2014	1	0	1
2016	1	1	0
2017	1	1	0
2018	1	0	1
2019	1	0	0
