= Hélène Raguénès =

French canoeist

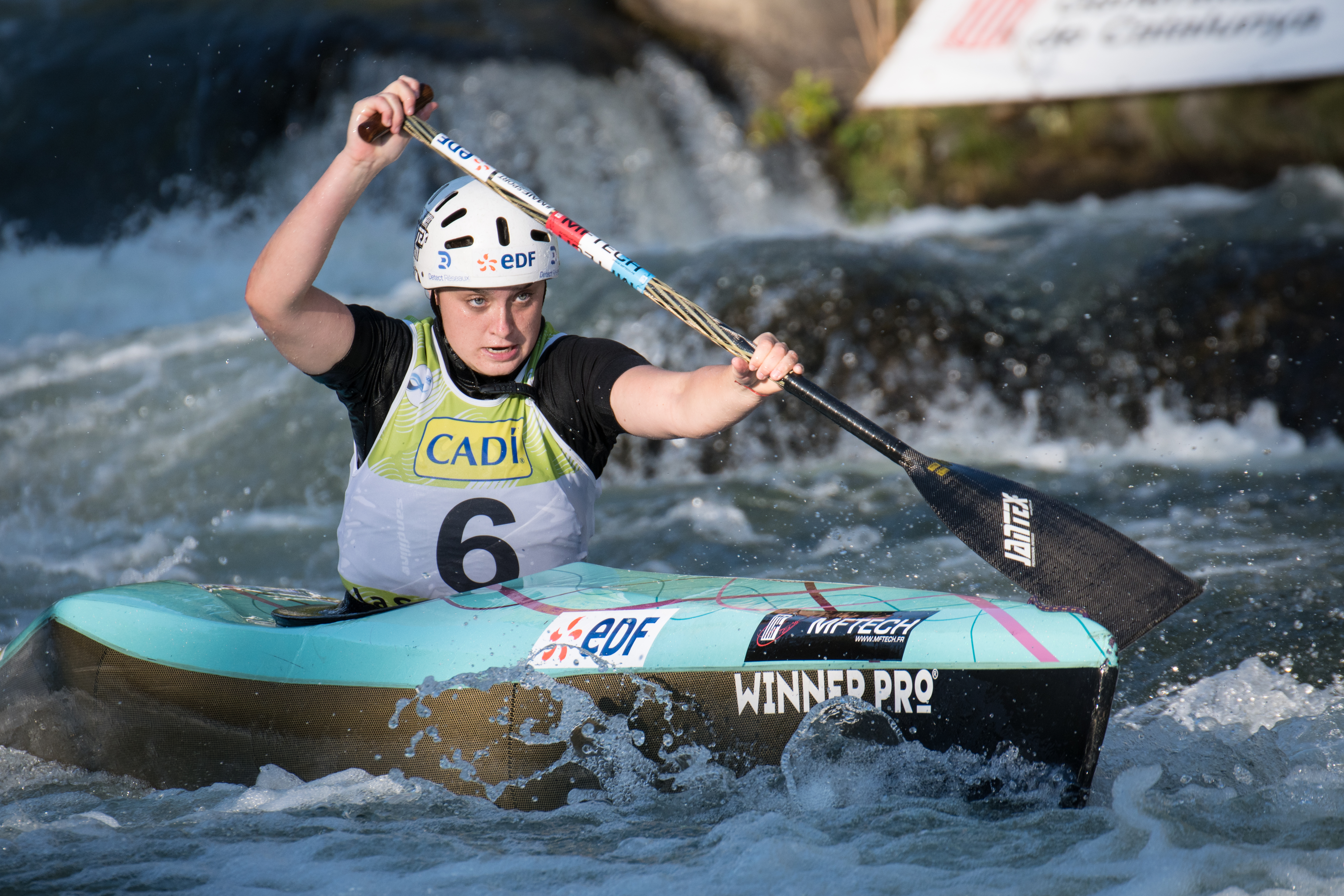
- Raguénès in 2019

Personal information
- Nationality: French
- Born: 29 August 2000 (age 25) France

Sport
- Sport: Canoeing
- Event: Wildwater canoeing
Medal record
| Event | 1st | 2nd | 3rd |
|---|---|---|---|
| World Championships | 1 | 0 | 2 |

Hélène Raguénès (born 29 August 2000) is a French female canoeist who won three medals at senior level at the Wildwater Canoeing World Championships.

== Medals at the World Championships ==
Senior

| Year | 1st place, gold medalist(s) | 2nd place, silver medalist(s) | 3rd place, bronze medalist(s) |
|---|---|---|---|
| 2018 | 0 | 0 | 2 |
| 2019 | 1 | 0 | 0 |
