= Jil-Sophie Eckert =

German canoeist (born 1996)

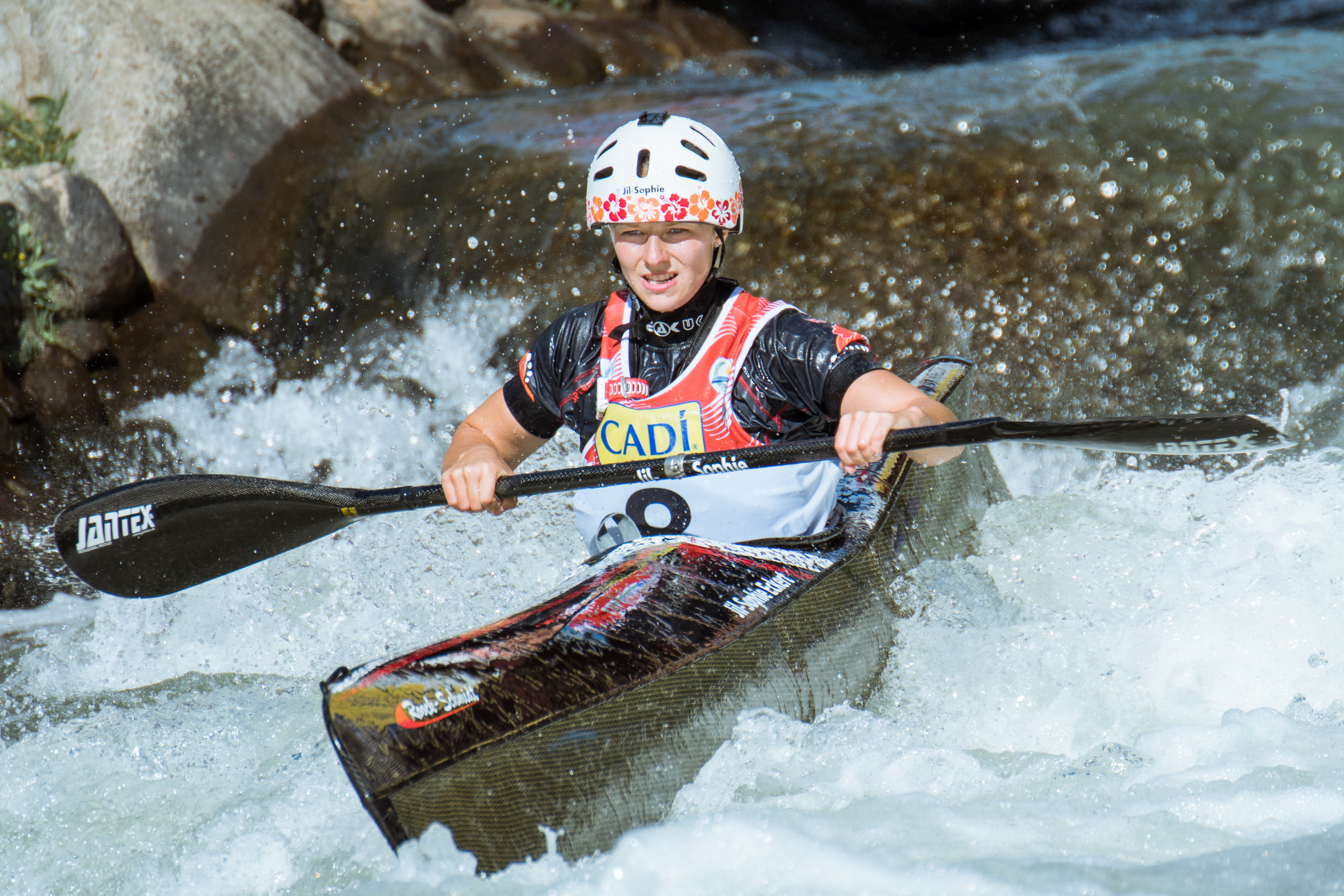
- Eckert in 2019

Personal information
- Nationality: German
- Born: 3 May 1996 (age 30) Germany

Sport
- Sport: Canoeing
- Event: Wildwater canoeing
Medal record
Event	1st	2nd	3rd
World Championships	0	0	2

Jil-Sophie Eckert (born 3 May 1996) is a German female canoeist who won two medals at senior level at the Wildwater Canoeing World Championships.

== Medals at the World Championships ==
Senior

Year	1st place, gold medalist(s)	2nd place, silver medalist(s)	3rd place, bronze medalist(s)
2018	0	0	1
2019	0	0	1
