= Fabiana Passoni =

Brazilian singer

Fabiana Passoni (born c. 1977) is a Brazilian singer best known for her jazz albums Dim the Lights (2013), Let Your Love Rise (2014) and Inner Bossa (2015). At the 2012 Brazilian International Press Awards she received an award for the Best Brazilian Singer Living in the U.S. She also received the 2013 as Notaveis award for her volunteer work and community service.

Born in Poços de Caldas, Brazil, Fabiana Passoni began singing when she was 6 years old. Her father would sit on the couch composing songs while encouraging her vocals to mature along with his. Fabiana's father taught the budding songstress the art of interpretation and how to play to an audience.

Fabiana ran a successful music school in her hometown in the late 1990s, before moving to the United States. While in New York City, Fabiana began singing bossa nova jazz fusion to American audiences. Artists such as Ella Fitzgerald and Leny Andrade influenced her style. She finally found her voice after moving to Los Angeles in 2007 and began composing songs for her debut album, É Minha Vez.

Fabiana fought against breast cancer for three years, during which time she released the acclaimed Naturalmente Brasi in 2011 featuring 12 original tracks.

In 2002, the Brazilian International Press Awards' Colégio Eleitoral composed of U.S.-based Brazilian groups and community organizations chose her as best Brazilian Female Singer living in the U.S. Fabiana's songs are a combination of jazz fusion with the older rhythms of Brazil such as bossa nova, baião, and samba. Her interpretations are passionate, sensual and exciting. Fabiana is Talk 2 Brazil's 2012 Person of the Year.

== Recordings ==
- É Minha Vez CD – 2007 (10 tracks)
- Across the Globe (Native Vibe) CD – 2008 (4 tracks – guest artist)
- Naturalmente Brasil CD/LP – 2011 (12 tracks)
- "Lovin' You" Single – 2012
- "Rock with You" Single – 2012
- Dim the Lights EP – 2013 (7 tracks)
- "Samba Fuleco" Single – 2013
- Let Your Love Rise EP – 2014 (3 tracks)
- Inner Bossa EP – 2015 (5 tracks)

== Stage Work ==
In October 2012, Fabiana Passoni performed in the musical Loving the Silent Tears.
