= Vladimír Slanina =

Czech canoeist

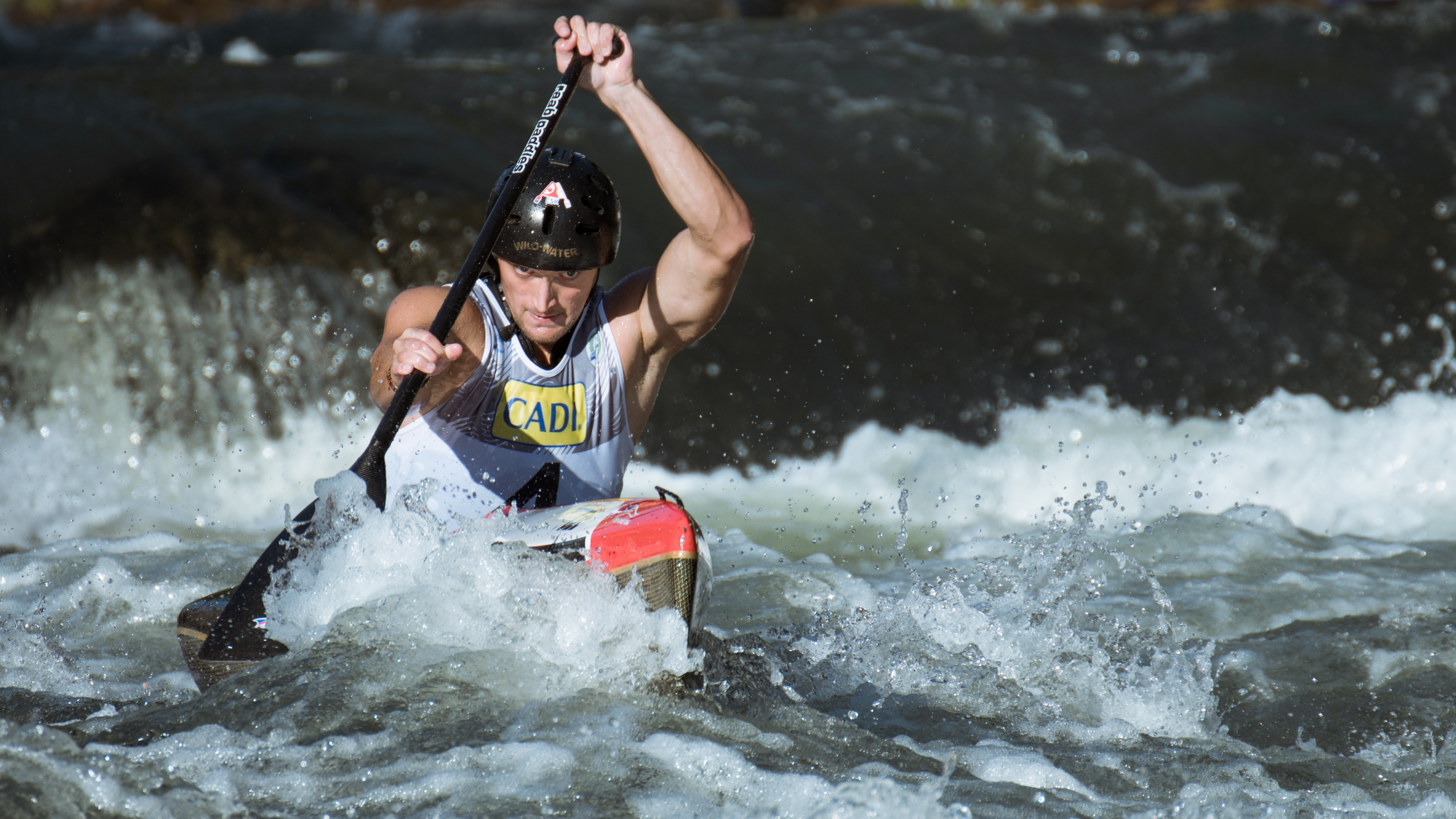
- Slanina in 2019

Personal information
- Nationality: Czech
- Born: 4 April 1994 (age 32) Czech Republic

Sport
- Sport: Canoeing
- Event: Wildwater canoeing
Medal record
Event	1st	2nd	3rd
World Championships	3	4	5

Vladimír Slanina (born 4 April 1994) is a Czech male canoeist who won 12 medals at senior level at the Wildwater Canoeing World Championships.

He is the son of Vladimír Slanina, canoeist too.

== Medals at the World Championships ==
Senior

Year	1st place, gold medalist(s)	2nd place, silver medalist(s)	3rd place, bronze medalist(s)
2014	0	2	0
2016	1	0	3
2017	0	1	0
2018	2	0	0
2019	0	1	2
