= Christina Massini =

German canoeist

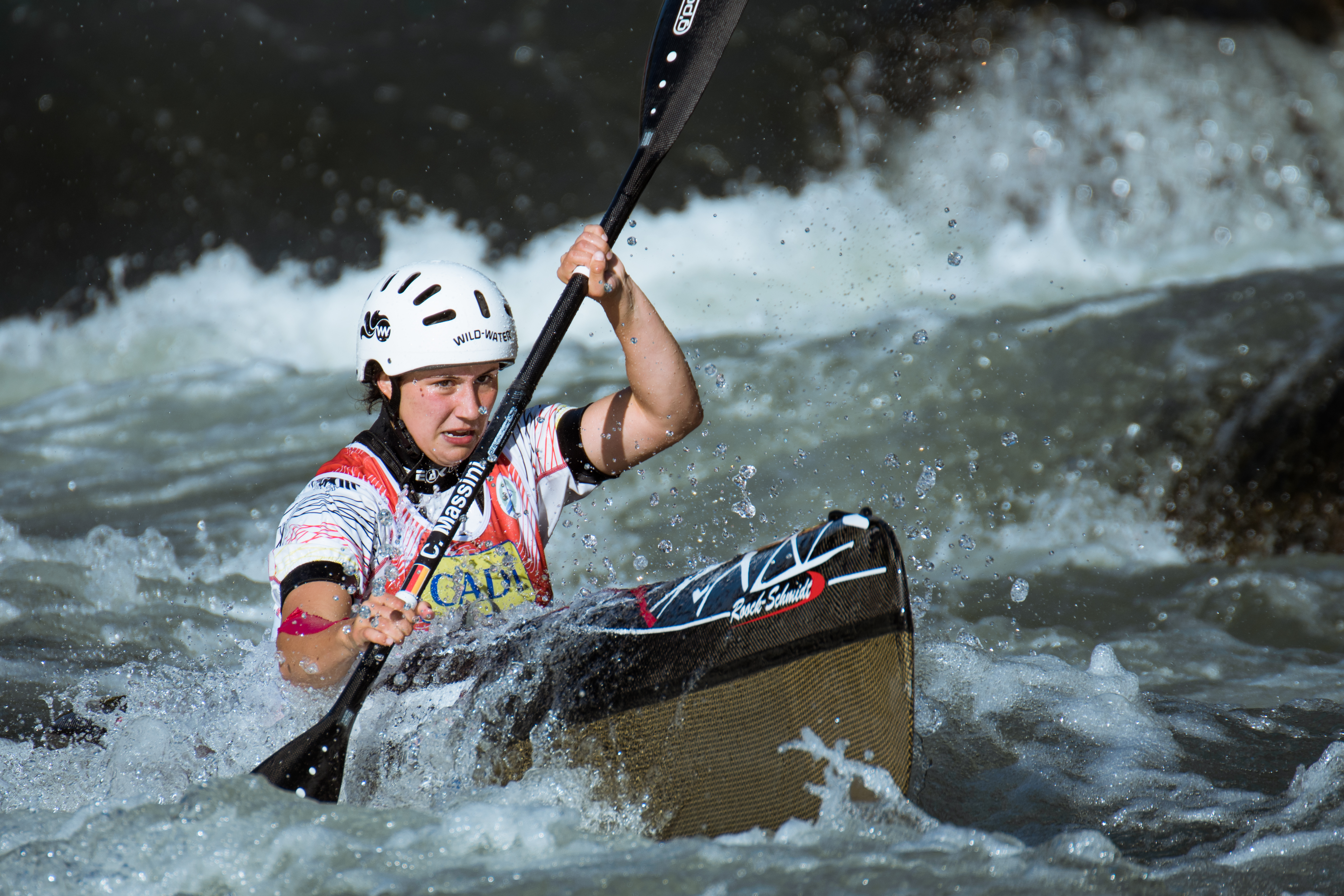

Sport
- Country: Germany
- Sport: canoeing

Christina Massini is a German female canoeist who was finalist at senior level at the 2019 Wildwater Canoeing World Championships.
