= Ole Schwarz =

German canoeist

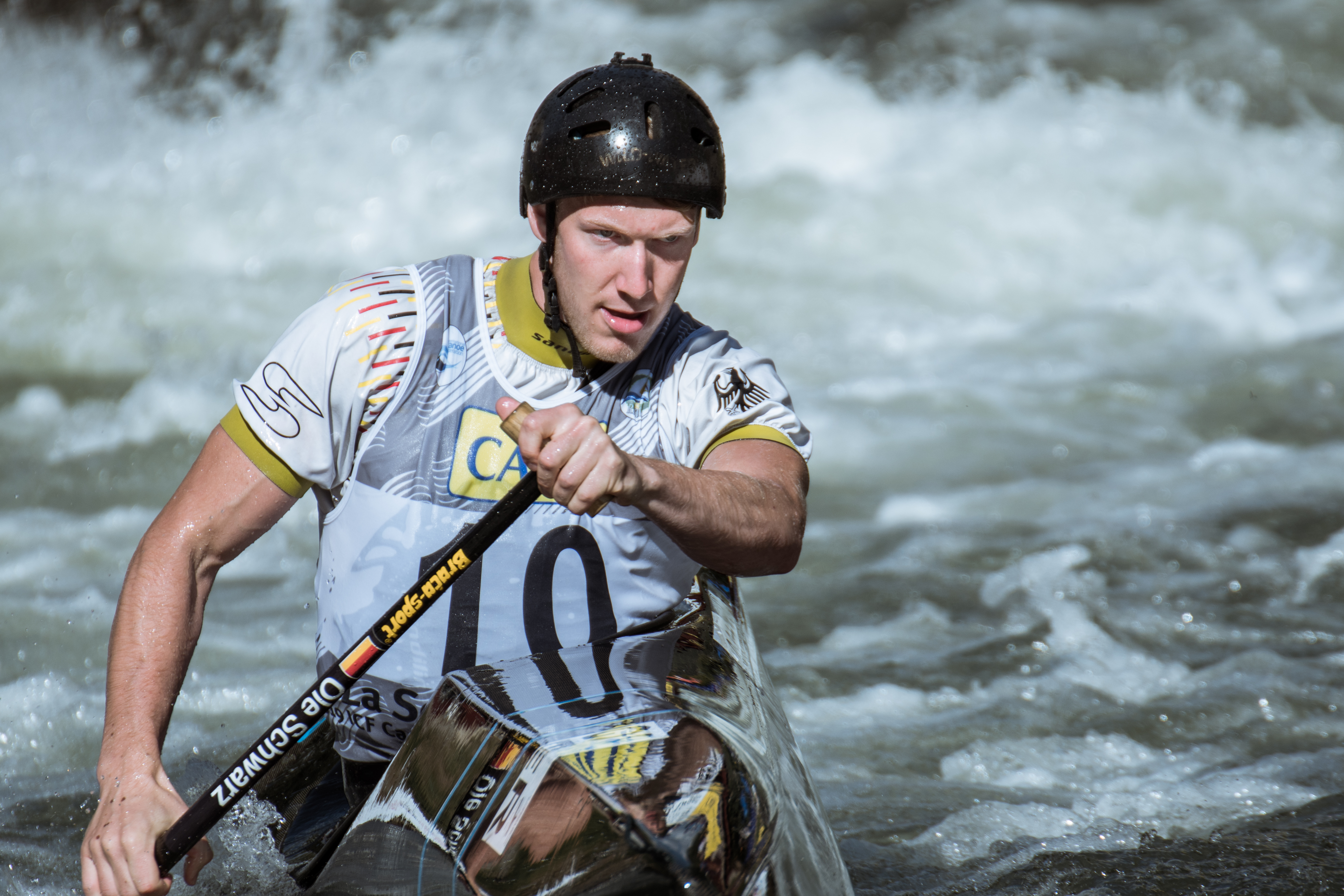
- Schwarz in 2019

Personal information
- Nationality: German
- Born: 29 July 1997 (age 28) Germany

Sport
- Sport: Canoeing
- Event: Wildwater canoeing
Medal record
Event	1st	2nd	3rd
World Championships	0	1	0

Ole Schwarz (born 29 July 1997) is a German male canoeist who won a medal at senior level at the Wildwater Canoeing World Championships.

== Medals at the World Championships ==
Senior

Year	1st place, gold medalist(s)	2nd place, silver medalist(s)	3rd place, bronze medalist(s)
2019	0	1	0
