= Phénicia Dupras =

French canoeist

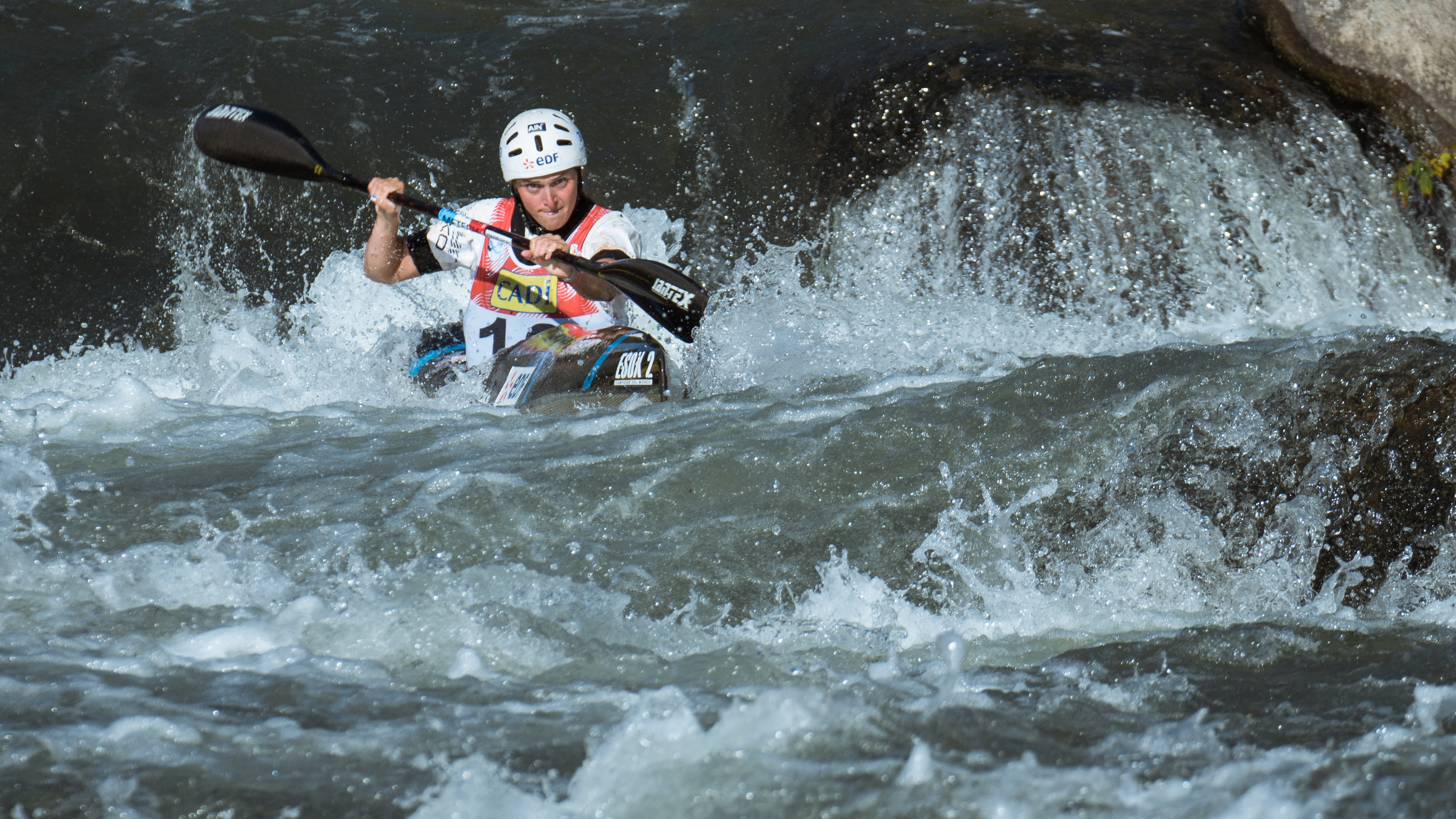
- Dupras in 2019

Personal information
- Nationality: French
- Born: 8 August 1996 (age 29) France

Sport
- Sport: Canoeing
- Event: Wildwater canoeing
- Club: Ckc Vallée de l'Ain Catégorie
Medal record
Event	1st	2nd	3rd
World Championships	3	1	1

Phénicia Dupras (born 8 August 1996) is a French female canoeist who won five medals at senior level at the Wildwater Canoeing World Championships.

== Medals at the World Championships ==
Senior

Year	1st place, gold medalist(s)	2nd place, silver medalist(s)	3rd place, bronze medalist(s)
2016	1	0	1
2017	1	0	0
2019	1	1	0
