= Mathilde Valdenaire =

French canoeist

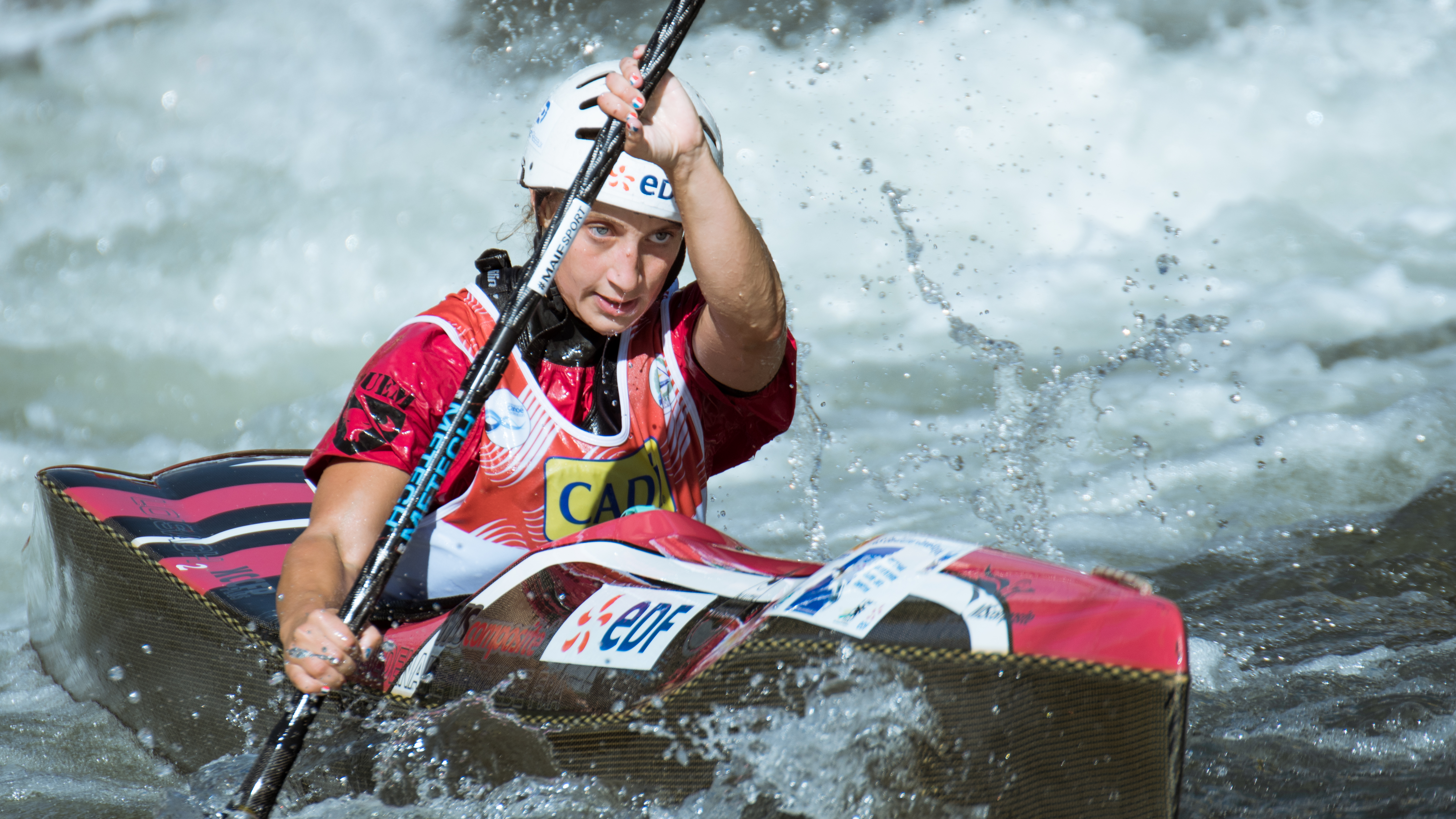
- Valdenaire in 2019

Personal information
- Nationality: French
- Born: 11 July 1998 (age 27) France

Sport
- Sport: Canoeing
- Event: Wildwater canoeing
Medal record
Event	1st	2nd	3rd
World Championships	0	1	0

Mathilde Valdenaire (born 11 July 1998) is a French female canoeist who won a medal at senior level at the Wildwater Canoeing World Championships.

== Medals at the World Championships ==
Senior

Year	1st place, gold medalist(s)	2nd place, silver medalist(s)	3rd place, bronze medalist(s)
2019	0	1	0
