= Lucas Pazat =

French canoeist

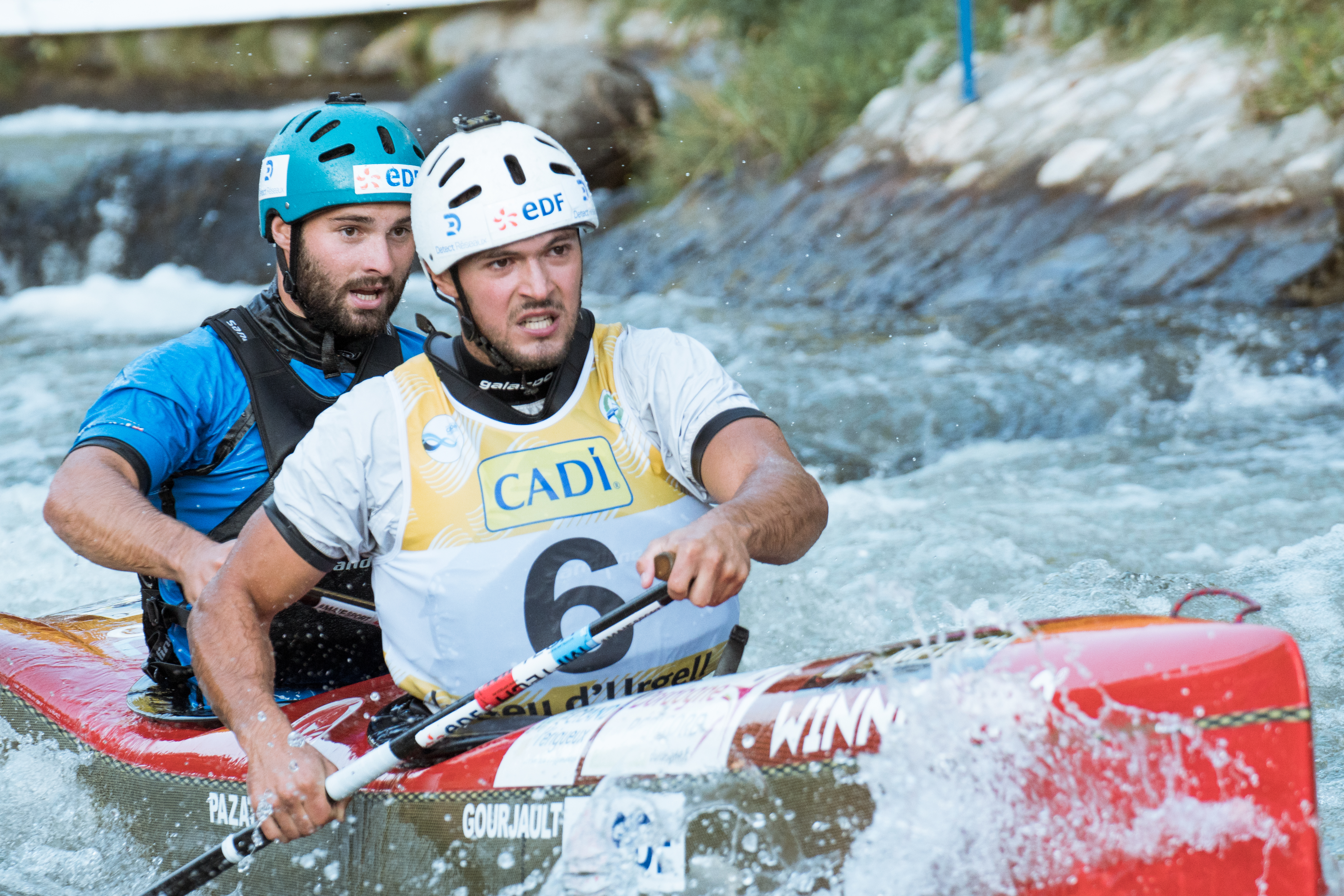
- Pazat (blue helmet) with Ancelin Gourjault in 2019

Personal information
- Nationality: French
- Born: 7 October 1993 (age 32) France

Sport
- Sport: Canoeing
- Event: Wildwater canoeing
Medal record
Event	1st	2nd	3rd
World Championships	2	1	1

Lucas Pazat (born 7 October 1993) is a French male canoeist who won four medals at senior level at the Wildwater Canoeing World Championships.

== Medals at the World Championships ==
Senior

Year	1st place, gold medalist(s)	2nd place, silver medalist(s)	3rd place, bronze medalist(s)
2018	1	1	1
2019	1	0	0
