= Filip Hric =

Czech canoeist

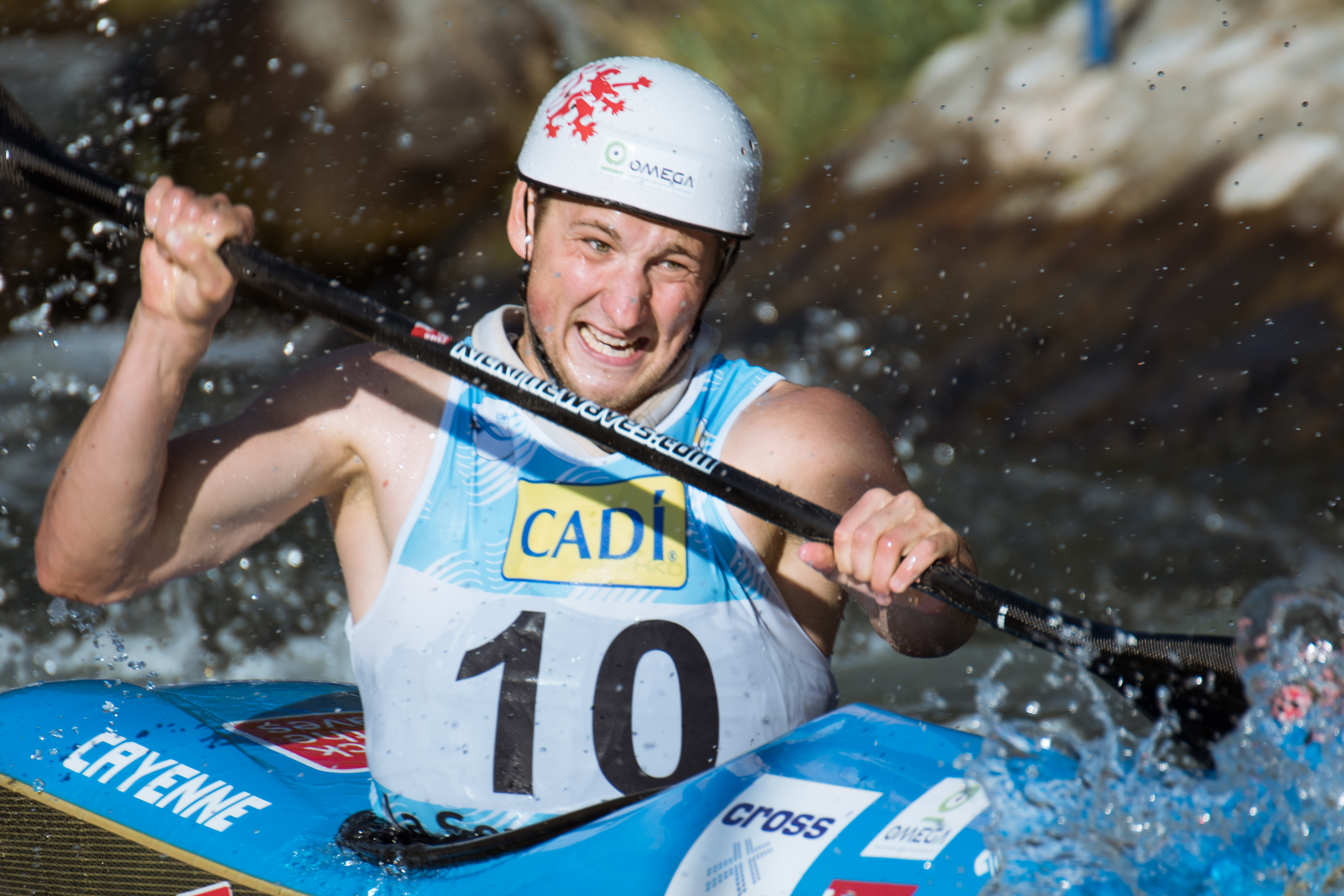
- Hric in 2019

Personal information
- Nationality: Czech
- Born: 28 February 1993 (age 33) Czech Republic

Sport
- Sport: Canoeing
- Event: Wildwater canoeing
Medal record
Event	1st	2nd	3rd
World Championships	0	0	1

Filip Hric (born 28 February 1993) is a Czech male canoeist who won a medal at senior level at the Wildwater Canoeing World Championships.

== Medals at the World Championships ==
Senior

Year	1st place, gold medalist(s)	2nd place, silver medalist(s)	3rd place, bronze medalist(s)
2019	0	0	1
