= Maxence Barouh =

French canoeist

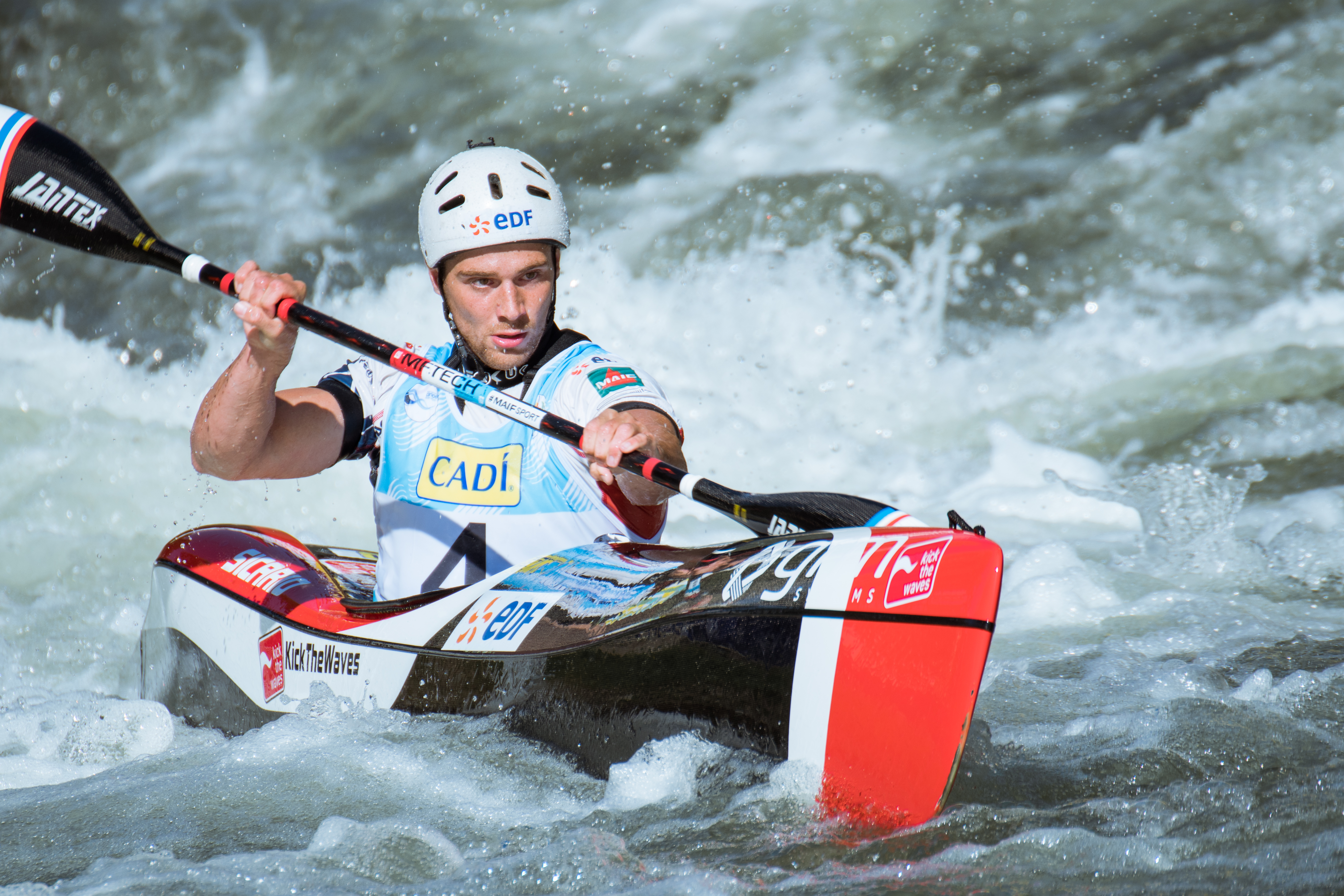
- Barouh in 2019

Personal information
- Nationality: French
- Born: 7 September 1995 (age 31) France

Sport
- Sport: Canoeing
- Event: Wildwater canoeing
Medal record
Event	1st	2nd	3rd
World Championships	1	3	0

Maxence Barouh (born 7 September 1995) is a French male canoeist who won four medals at senior level at the Wildwater Canoeing World Championships.

== Medals at the World Championships ==
Senior

Year	1st place, gold medalist(s)	2nd place, silver medalist(s)	3rd place, bronze medalist(s)
2016	0	1	0
2018	1	1	0
2019	0	1	0
