= Claire Haab =

French canoeist

Personal information
- Nationality: French
- Born: 13 December 1989 (age 36) France

Sport
- Sport: Canoeing
- Event: Wildwater canoeing
Medal record
Event	1st	2nd	3rd
World Championships	2	0	0
European Championships	1	0	2
Total	3	0	2

Claire Haab (born 13 December 1989) is a French female canoeist who won five medals at the senior level of the Wildwater Canoeing World Championships and European Wildwater Championships.
