= Paul Graton =

French canoeist

Personal information
- Nationality: French
- Born: 5 June 1990 (age 36) Nantes, France

Sport
- Sport: Canoeing
- Event: Wildwater canoeing

Paul Graton (born 5 June 1990) is a French male canoeist who won medals at senior level at the Wildwater Canoeing World Championships.

He won two editions of the Wildwater Canoeing World Cup in K1.
