= Quentin Dazeur =

French canoeist

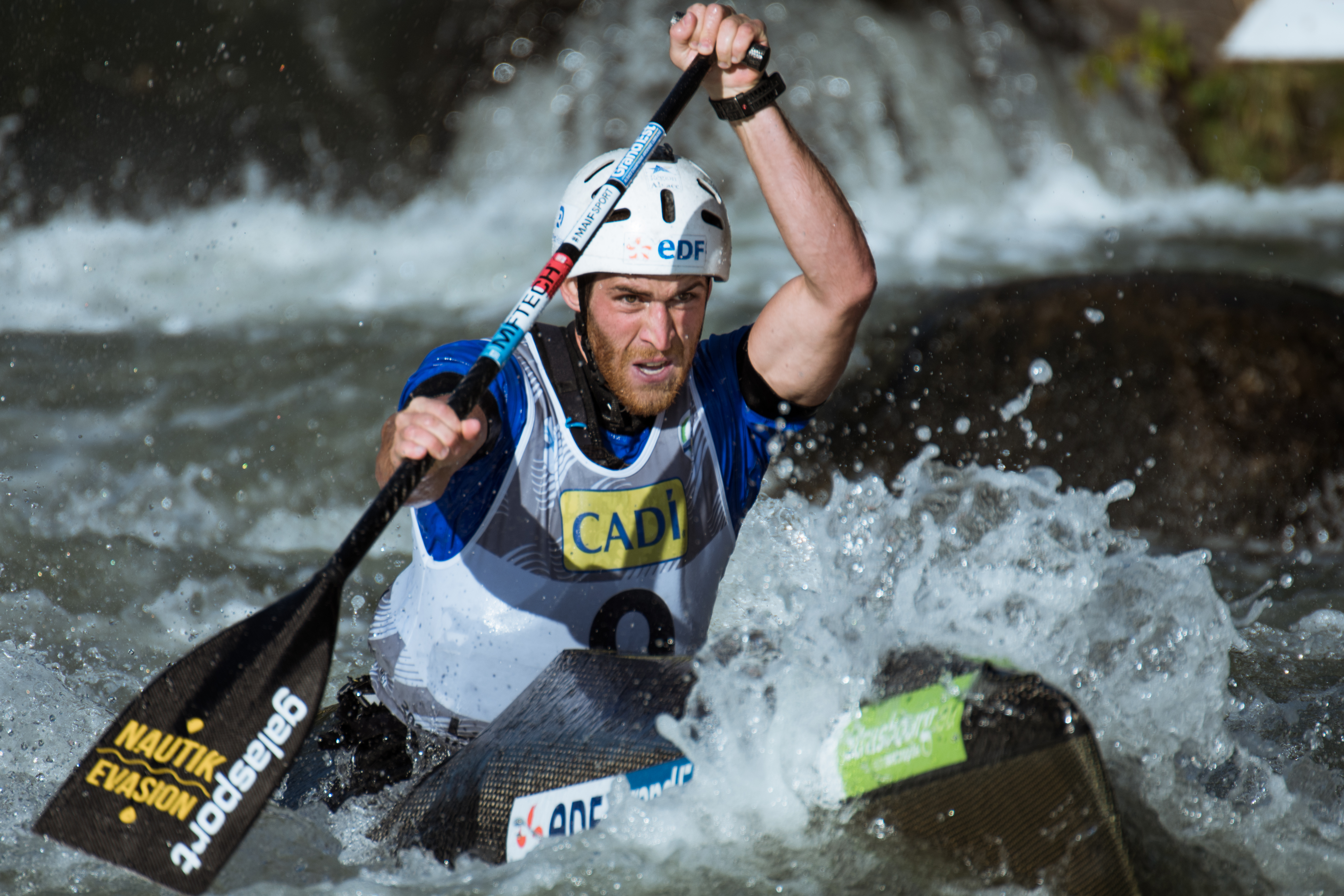
- Dazeur in 2019

Personal information
- Nationality: French
- Born: 15 November 1991 (age 34) Strasbourg, France

Sport
- Sport: Canoeing
- Event: Wildwater canoeing
Medal record
Event	1st	2nd	3rd
World Championships	18	4	2
European Championships	2	6	5
Total	20	10	7

Quentin Dazeur (born 15 November 1991) is a French male canoeist who won 24 medals at senior level at the Wildwater Canoeing World Championships.

He won a Wildwater Canoeing World Cup in C1. He was born in France
