= Wildwater Canoeing World Championships =

International event in canoeing

- Genre: Wildwater canoeing
- Frequency: Biennial till 2010, Annual since 2011
- Location: Varies
- Inaugurated: 1959
- Participants: Men and women
- Organiser: International Canoe Federation

The Wildwater Canoeing World Championships are an international event in canoeing organized by the International Canoe Federation. The World Championships have taken place every two years from 1959 to 1995 and then from 1996 to 2001, from 2011 the event is annual.

== Editions ==
In the odd edition 2011, 2013, 2015, 2017 and 2019 the championships included only the sprint events. The classic race differs from the sprint race by the length of the course, therefore by the duration, which can go from 6 to 25 minutes for the classic race and up to a maximum of 2 minutes for the sprint race.

Starting from the 2017 edition of Pau, the sprint championships took place together with the Canoe Slalom World Championships and given the remarkable success this was repeated for the second time at La Seu d'Urgell in 2019.

| # | Year | Venue | Nation | Notes |
|---|---|---|---|---|
| 1 | 1959 | Treignac | France | |
| 2 | 1961 | Hainsberg | East Germany | |
| 3 | 1963 | Spittal | Austria | |
| 4 | 1965 | Spittal | Austria | |
| 5 | 1967 | Špindlerův Mlýn | Czechoslovakia | |
| 6 | 1969 | Bourg-Saint-Maurice | France | |
| 7 | 1971 | Merano | Italy | |
| 8 | 1973 | Muotathal | Switzerland | |
| 9 | 1975 | Skopje | Yugoslavia | |
| 10 | 1977 | Spittal | Austria | |
| 11 | 1979 | Desbiens | Canada | |
| 12 | 1981 | Bala | United Kingdom | |
| 13 | 1983 | Merano | Italy | |
| 14 | 1985 | Garmisch-Partenkirchen | West Germany | |
| 15 | 1987 | Bourg-Saint-Maurice | France | |
| 16 | 1989 | Savage River | United States | |
| 17 | 1991 | Bovec | Yugoslavia | |
| 18 | 1993 | Mezzana | Italy | |
| 19 | 1995 | Bala | United Kingdom | |
| 20 | 1996 | Landeck | Austria | The championships are moved in even years. |
| 21 | 1998 | Garmisch-Partenkirchen | Germany | |
| 22 | 2000 | Treignac | France | |
| 23 | 2002 | Valsesia | Italy | |
| 24 | 2004 | Garmisch-Partenkirchen | Germany | |
| 25 | 2006 | Karlovy Vary | Czech Republic | |
| 26 | 2008 | Valsesia | Italy | |
| 27 | 2010 | Sort | Spain | |
| 28 | 2011 | Augsburg | Germany | Only sprint events and the competition becomes annual. |
| 29 | 2012 | Mâcot-la-Plagne | France | |
| 30 | 2013 | Solkan | Slovenia | Only sprint events. |
| 31 | 2014 | Valtellina | Italy | |
| 32 | 2015 | Wien | Austria | Only sprint events. |
| 33 | 2016 | Banja Luka | Bosnia and Herzegovina | |
| 34 | 2017 | Pau | France | Only sprint events and together with the 2017 Canoe Slalom World Championships. |
| 35 | 2018 | Muotathal | Switzerland | |
| 36 | 2019 | La Seu d'Urgell | Spain | Only sprint events and together with the 2019 Canoe Slalom World Championships |
| 37 | 2021 | Bratislava | Slovakia | Only sprint events and together with the 2021 Canoe Slalom World Championships |
| 38 | 2022 | Treignac | France | |
| 39 | 2023 | Augsburg | Germany | Augsburg Eiskanal, Only sprint events |
| 40 | 2024 | Sabero | Spain | Esla river |
| 41 | 2025 | České Budějovice | Czech Republic | České Vrbné Slalom Course, Only sprint events |
| 42 | 2026 | Banja Luka | Bosnia and Herzegovina | Vrbas river |

== Events ==
First time

| Year | K1 | | | | | | | | C1 | | | | | | | | C2 | | | | Other | Total |
|---|---|---|---|---|---|---|---|---|---|---|---|---|---|---|---|---|---|---|---|---|---|---|
| Year | Men | | | | Women | | | | Men | | | | Women | | | | Men | | | | Other | Total |
| Year | Class/Ind | Class/Team | Sprint/Ind | Sprint/Team | Class/Ind | Class/Team | Sprint/Ind | Sprint/Team | Class/Ind | Class/Team | Sprint/Ind | Sprint/Team | Class/Ind | Class/Team | Sprint/Ind | Sprint/Team | Class/Ind | Class/Team | Sprint/Ind | Sprint/Team | Other | Total |
| 1959 | • (F1) | | | | • (F1) | | | | • | | | | | | | | • | • (mix) | | | | 5 |
| 1961 | • (F1) | | | | • (F1) | | | | • | | | | | | | | • | • (mix) | | | | 5 |
| 1963 | • | • | | | • | • | | | • | • | | | | | | | • | • | | | 5 (Note: F1 classic men and women + F1 classin men team + C2 mix classic individual and team) | 13 |
| 1965 | • | • | | | • | • | | | • | • | | | | | | | • | • | | | 2 (Note: C2 mix classic individual and team) | 10 |
| 1967 | • | • | | | • | • | | | • | • | | | | | | | • | • | | | 1 (Note: C2 mix classic) | 9 |
| 1969 | • | • | | | • | • | | | • | • | | | | | | | • | • | | | 2 | 10 |
| 1971 | • | • | | | • | • | | | • | • | | | | | | | • | • | | | 2 | 10 |
| 1973 | • | • | | | • | • | | | • | • | | | | | | | • | • | | | 2 | 10 |
| 1975 | • | • | | | • | • | | | • | • | | | | | | | • | • | | | 2 | 10 |
| 1977 | • | • | | | • | • | | | • | • | | | | | | | • | • | | | 1 | 9 |
| 1979 | • | • | | | • | • | | | • | • | | | | | | | • | • | | | | 8 |
| 1981 | • | • | | | • | • | | | • | • | | | | | | | • | • | | | 1 | 9 |
| 1983 | • | • | | | • | • | | | • | • | | | | | | | • | • | | | | 8 |
| 1985 | • | • | | | • | • | | | • | • | | | | | | | • | • | | | | 8 |
| 1987 | • | • | | | • | • | | | • | • | | | | | | | • | • | | | | 8 |
| 1989 | • | • | | | • | • | | | • | • | | | | | | | • | • | | | | 8 |
| 1991 | • | • | | | • | • | | | • | • | | | | | | | • | • | | | | 8 |
| 1993 | • | • | | | • | • | | | • | • | | | | | | | • | • | | | | 8 |
| 1995 | • | • | | | • | • | | | • | • | | | | | | | • | • | | | | 8 |
| 1996 | • | • | | | • | • | | | • | • | | | | | | | • | • | | | | 8 |
| 1998 | • | • | | | • | • | | | • | • | | | | | | | • | • | | | | 8 |
| 2000 | • | • | | | • | • | | | • | • | | | | | | | • | | | | | 7 |
| 2002 | • | • | • | | • | • | • | | • | • | • | | | | | | • | • | • | | | 12 |
| 2004 | • | • | • | | • | • | • | | • | • | • | | | | | | • | • | • | | | 12 |
| 2006 | • | • | • | | • | • | • | | • | • | • | | | | | | • | • | • | | | 12 |
| 2008 | • | • | • | • | • | • | • | • | • | • | • | • | | | | | • | • | • | • | | 16 |
| 2010 | • | • | • | • | • | • | • | • | • | • | • | • | | | | | • | • | • | • | | 16 |
| 2011 | | | • | • | | | • | • | | | • | • | | | • | | | | • | • | | 9 |
| 2012 | • | • | • | • | • | • | • | • | • | • | • | • | • | | • | | • | • | • | • | | 18 |
| 2013 | | | • | • | | | • | • | | | • | • | | | • | | | | • | • | | 9 |
| 2014 | • | • | • | • | • | • | • | • | • | • | • | • | • | | • | | • | • | • | • | | 18 |
| 2015 | | | • | • | | | • | • | | | • | • | | | • | | | | • | • | | 9 |
| 2016 | • | • | • | • | • | • | • | • | • | • | • | • | • | | • | | • | • | • | • | | 18 |
| 2017 | | | • | • | | | • | • | | | • | • | | | • | | | | • | • | | 9 |
| 2018 | • | • | • | • | • | • | • | • | • | • | • | • | • | | • | | • | • | • | • | | 18 |
| 2019 | | | • | • | | | • | • | | | • | • | | | • | | | | • | • | 1 (Note: C2 sprint women) | 10 |

== Winners ==
This is the list of the winners of the main six events (C1 and C2 men and women, K1 men and women).

=== K1 classic ===
Since the 2002 edition also the K1 sprint competition has also been introduced.

==== Men individual ====
F1 until 1963, 1963 F1 and K1, from 1964 K1.

| Year | 1st place, gold medalist(s) | 2nd place, silver medalist(s) | 3rd place, bronze medalist(s) |
|---|---|---|---|
| 1959 | (West Germany) Toni Prijon | (Socialist Federal Republic of Yugoslavia) Pavel Bone | (Switzerland) Eduard Rothpletz |
| 1961 | (Czechoslovakia) Zdeněk Košťál | (Austria) Rudolf Klepp | (Socialist Federal Republic of Yugoslavia) Pavel Bone |
| 1963 | (Austria) Rudolf Klepp | (West Germany) Karl-Heinz Englet | (Switzerland) Jean Grosrey |
| 1963 | (Austria) Kurt Presslmayr | (West Germany) Klaus Lettmann | (West Germany) Siegfried Gunzenberger |
| 1965 | (Austria) Kurt Presslmayr | (West Germany) Heinz Panek | (West Germany) Lothar Zentgraf |
| 1967 | (East Germany) Fritz Lange | (East Germany) Jürgen Bremer | (East Germany) Peter Lust |
| 1969 | (Belgium) Jean-Pierre Burny | (Austria) Kurt Presslmayr | (West Germany) Jochen Schwarz |
| 1971 | (West Germany) Bernd Kast | (Austria) Kurt Presslmayr | (West Germany) Jochen Schwarz |
| 1973 | (Belgium) Jean-Pierre Burny | (West Germany) Bernd Kast | (West Germany) Ulrich Pech |
| 1975 | (Belgium) Jean-Pierre Burny | (France) Michel Magdinier | (West Germany) Bernd Kast |
| 1977 | (Austria) Gerhard Peinhaupt | (France) Michel Magdinier | (West Germany) Bernd Kast |
| 1979 | (Belgium) Jean-Pierre Burny | (United Kingdom) Robert Campbell | (France) Claude Benezit |
| 1981 | (France) Claude Benezit | (Italy) Marco Previde Massara | (France) Bernard Morin |
| 1983 | (Italy) Marco Previde Massara | (West Germany) Degenhard Pfeiffer | (West Germany) Konrad Hollerieth |
| 1985 | (Italy) Marco Previde Massara | (France) Claude Benezit | (United States) Jon Fishburn |
| 1987 | (France) Antoine Goetschy | (West Germany) Rolf Kilian | (Italy) Cesare Mulazzi |
| 1989 | (Italy) Marco Previde Massara | (United Kingdom) Neil Stamps | (France) Antoine Goetschy |
| 1991 | (Germany) Markus Gickler | (France) Yves Masson | (Germany) Rolf Kilian |
| 1993 | (Germany) Markus Gickler | (Italy) Robert Pontarollo | (Italy) Cesare Mulazzi |
| 1995 | (Germany) Markus Gickler | (Italy) Robert Pontarollo | (Germany) Thomas Koelmann |
| 1996 | (Germany) Markus Gickler | (Italy) Robert Pontarollo | (Germany) Axel Lehmacher |
| 1998 | (Germany) Thomas Koelmann | (France) Michael Fargier | (France) Gilles Calliet |
| 2000 | (Germany) Thomas Koelmann | (Germany) Florian Wohlers | (Italy) Robert Pontarollo |
| 2002 | (France) Boris Saunier | (Italy) Robert Pontarollo | (Czech Republic) Kamil Mrůzek |
| 2004 | (Italy) Carlo Mercati | (Czech Republic) Robert Knebel | (Italy) Robert Pontarollo |
| 2006 | (Czech Republic) Kamil Mrůzek | (Germany) Max Hoff | (Czech Republic) Tomáš Slovák |
| 2008 | (Italy) Maximilian Benassi | (Germany) Stephan Stiefenhöfer | (Australia) Schmid Gerhard |
| 2010 | (France) Loïc Vynisale | (Germany) Achim Overbeck | (Slovenia) Nejc Žnidarčič |
| 2012 | (Germany) Tobias Bong | (France) Rémi Pété | (Slovenia) Nejc Žnidarčič |
| 2014 | (Germany) Tobias Bong | (France) Rémi Pété | (Czech Republic) Kamil Mrůzek |
| 2016 | (Belgium) Maxime Richard | (Germany) Tobias Bong | (France) Rémi Pété |
| 2018 | (Slovenia) Simon Oven | (France) Paul Jean | (France) Paul Graton |
| 2022 | (France) Quentin Bonnetain | (France) Maxence Barouh | (Germany) Max Hoff |
| 2024 | (Slovenia) Simon Oven | (France) Maxence Barouh | (Belgium) Léo Montulet |
| 2026 | (Belgium) Léo Montulet | (France) Maxence Barouh | (France) Augustin Reboul |

==== Women individual ====
F1 until 1963, 1963 F1 and K1, from 1964 K1.

| Year | 1st place, gold medalist(s) | 2nd place, silver medalist(s) | 3rd place, bronze medalist(s) |
|---|---|---|---|
| 1959 | (West Germany) Rosemarie Biesinger | (West Germany) Inge Walthemate | (East Germany) Eva Setzkorn |
| 1961 | (East Germany) Anneliese Bauer | (Czechoslovakia) Jana Zvěřinová | (East Germany) Eva Setzkorn |
| 1963 | (East Germany) Anneliese Bauer | (West Germany) Rosemarie Biesinger | (West Germany) Hilde Urbaniak |
| 1963 | (East Germany) Ursula Gläser | (West Germany) Bärbel Körner | (Czechoslovakia) Ludmilla Veberova |
| 1965 | (East Germany) Gundula Jander | (West Germany) Bärbel Körner | (East Germany) Bärbel Richter |
| 1967 | (West Germany) Heide Schröter | (East Germany) Lia Schilhuber | (East Germany) Bärbel Richter |
| 1969 | (Czechoslovakia) Ludmila Polesná | (West Germany) Ulrike Deppe | (West Germany) Anemie Amslinger |
| 1971 | (West Germany) Ulrike Deppe | (West Germany) Magda Wunderlich | (Czechoslovakia) Ludmila Polesná |
| 1973 | (West Germany) Gisela Grothaus | (West Germany) Ulrike Deppe | (Switzerland) Elsbeth Käser |
| 1975 | (West Germany) Gisela Grothaus | (United Kingdom) Pauline Squires-Goodwin | (United Kingdom) Hillary Peacock |
| 1977 | (West Germany) Gisela Grothaus | (Switzerland) Elsbeth Käser | (France) Dominique Berigaud |
| 1979 | (France) Dominique Gardette | (West Germany) Gisela Grothaus | (West Germany) Renate Prijon |
| 1981 | (France) Dominique Gardette | (West Germany) Gisela Grothaus | (East Germany) Anne Plant |
| 1983 | (West Germany) Dagmar Stupp | (West Germany) Gisela Grothaus | (West Germany) Karin Wahl |
| 1985 | (West Germany) Karin Wirz | (West Germany) Andrea Hollerieth | (France) Marie-Pierre Le Cann |
| 1987 | (France) Dominique Gardette | (West Germany) Karin Wirz | (France) Nathalie Beaurain |
| 1989 | (France) Sabine Kleinhenz | (Austria) Ursula Profanter | (France) Aurore Bringard |
| 1991 | (Germany) Karin Wirz | (France) Sabine Kleinhenz | (Austria) Ursula Profanter |
| 1993 | (Austria) Ursula Profanter | (Germany) Karin Wirz | (France) Sabine Kleinhenz |
| 1995 | (Austria) Ursula Profanter | (France) Laurence Castet | (France) Aurore Bringard |
| 1996 | (Austria) Ursula Profanter | (France) Laurence Castet | (Germany) Claudia Brokof |
| 1998 | (Germany) Claudia Brokof | (Austria) Ursula Profanter | (France) Anne-Blandine Crochet |
| 2000 | (Czech Republic) Michaela Strnadová | (France) Magali Thiébaut | (France) Anne-Blandine Crochet |
| 2002 | (Czech Republic) Michaela Strnadová | (France) Nathalie Leclerc | (Austria) Ursula Profanter |
| 2004 | (Switzerland) Sabine Eichenberger | (France) Anne-Blandine Crochet | (Germany) Sabine Füsser |
| 2006 | (Czech Republic) Michaela Strnadová | (Germany) Alexandra Heidrich | (Switzerland) Sabine Eichenberger |
| 2008 | (Switzerland) Sabine Eichenberger | (Czech Republic) Kateřina Vacíková | (Germany) Manuela Stöberl |
| 2010 | (Germany) Alke Overbeck | (United Kingdom) Hannah Brown | (United Kingdom) Jessica Oughton |
| 2012 | (Germany) Manuela Stöberl | (France) Sixtine Malaterre | (Germany) Alke Overbeck |
| 2014 | (Germany) Alke Overbeck | (Czech Republic) Michaela Strnadová | (France) Manon Hostens |
| 2016 | (France) Manon Hostens | (Germany) Alke Overbeck | (Italy) Costanza Bonaccorsi |
| 2018 | (Czech Republic) Martina Satková | (France) Manon Hostens | (Switzerland) Melanie Mathys |
| 2022 | (France) Manon Hostens | (Italy) Mathilde Rosa | (France) Claire Bren |
| 2024 | (France) Claire Bren | (United Kingdom) Kerry Christie | (Italy) Cecilia Panato |
| 2026 | (Italy) Cecilia Panato | (Italy) Mathilde Rosa | (Czech Republic) Kristina Novosadová |

=== K1 sprint ===
==== Men individual ====
| Year | 1st place, gold medalist(s) | 2nd place, silver medalist(s) | 3rd place, bronze medalist(s) |
|---|---|---|---|
| 2002 | (France) Boris Saunier | (Italy) Robert Pontarollo | (France) Rudy Gerard |
| 2004 | (France) Arnaud Hybois | (Italy) Robert Pontarollo | (Czech Republic) Tomáš Slovák |
| 2006 | (Germany) Max Hoff | (France) Arnaud Hybois | (Czech Republic) Tomáš Slovák |
| 2008 | (Slovenia) Lovro Leban | (France) Rudy Gerard | (Czech Republic) Tomáš Slovák |
| 2010 | (Belgium) Maxime Richard | (Slovenia) Nejc Znidarcic | (Czech Republic) Tomáš Slovák |
| 2011 | (Slovenia) Nejc Žnidarčič | (Czech Republic) Kamil Mrůzek | (France) Rémi Pété (France) Paul Graton |
| 2012 | (Slovenia) Nejc Žnidarčič | (Germany) Tobias Bong | (United Kingdom) Ben Oakley |
| 2013 | (Belgium) Maxime Richard | (Slovenia) Nejc Žnidarčič | (Czech Republic) Richard Hála |
| 2014 | (France) Quentin Bonnetain | (Slovenia) Nejc Žnidarčič | (France) Paul Graton |
| 2015 | (France) Paul Graton | (Slovenia) Nejc Žnidarčič | (Slovenia) Vid Debeljak |
| 2016 | (Belgium) Maxime Richard | (France) Paul Graton | (Slovenia) Vid Debeljak |
| 2017 | (Slovenia) Anže Urankar | (Slovenia) Nejc Žnidarčič | (France) Gaëtan Guyonnet |
| 2018 | (Slovenia) Nejc Žnidarčič | (Slovenia) Vid Debeljak | (Slovenia) Anže Urankar |
| 2019 | (Slovenia) Nejc Žnidarčič | (France) Félix Bouvet | (France) Hugues Moret |
| 2021 | (Slovenia) Nejc Žnidarčič | (France) Luca Barone | (France) Maxence Barouh |
| 2022 | (Slovenia) Nejc Žnidarčič | (France) Maxence Barouh | (Czech Republic) Vojtěch Matějíček |
| 2023 | (Slovenia) Anže Urankar | (Slovenia) Simon Oven | (France) Luca Barone |
| 2024 | (Slovenia) Anže Urankar | (Slovenia) Nejc Žnidarčič | (France) Maxence Barouh |
| 2025 | (Slovenia) Anže Urankar | (Slovenia) Nejc Žnidarčič | (Czech Republic) Vojtěch Matějíček |
| 2026 | (Slovenia) Anže Urankar | (Czech Republic) Vojtěch Matějíček | (France) Maxence Barouh |

==== Women individual ====
| Year | 1st place, gold medalist(s) | 2nd place, silver medalist(s) | 3rd place, bronze medalist(s) |
|---|---|---|---|
| 2002 | (Czech Republic) Michala Strnadová | (Austria) Uschi Profanter | (France) Nathalie Leclerc |
| 2004 | (France) Anne-Blandine Crochet | (Germany) Sabine Füsser | (France) Nathalie Gastineau |
| 2006 | (Czech Republic) Michala Strnadová | (France) Nathalie Gastineau | (France) Helgard Marzolf |
| 2008 | (France) Nathalie Gastineau | (Czech Republic) Petra Slováková | (Germany) Sabine Füsser |
| 2010 | (United Kingdom) Jessica Oughton | (United Kingdom) Hannah Brown | (France) Laëtitia Parage |
| 2011 | (France) Laëtitia Parage | (France) Sixtine Malaterre | (Germany) Sabine Füsser |
| 2012 | (France) Claire Bren | (France) Laëtitia Parage | (France) Sixtine Malaterre |
| 2013 | (United Kingdom) Hannah Brown | (Switzerland) Melanie Mathys | (France) Sixtine Malaterre |
| 2014 | (Italy) Costanza Bonaccorsi | (France) Charlène Le Corvaisier | (France) Sixtine Malaterre |
| 2015 | (Italy) Costanza Bonaccorsi | (Czech Republic) Anežka Paloudová | (Czech Republic) Martina Satková |
| 2016 | (United Kingdom) Hannah Brown | (France) Manon Hostens | (Switzerland) Melanie Mathys |
| 2017 | (France) Claire Bren | (France) Manon Hostens | (United Kingdom) Hannah Brown |
| 2018 | (France) Manon Hostens | (Czech Republic) Martina Satková | (France) Claire Bren |
| 2019 | (France) Phénicia Dupras | (Czech Republic) Anežka Paloudová | (Czech Republic) Barbora Dimovová |
| 2021 | (France) Lise Vinet | (Czech Republic) Tereza Kneblová | (Germany) Jil-Sophie Eckert |
| 2022 | (France) Manon Hostens | (Czech Republic) Klára Vaňková | (Italy) Mathilde Rosa |
| 2023 | (Czech Republic) Marie Němcová | (Italy) Giulia Formenton | (France) Lise Vinet |
| 2024 | (Czech Republic) Marie Němcová | (Czech Republic) Kristina Novosadová | (Slovenia) Ana Šteblaj |
| 2025 | (Czech Republic) Klára Vaňková | (Italy) Mathilde Rosa | (Germany) Luisa Puttkammer |
| 2026 | (Czech Republic) Kristina Novosadová | (Germany) Luisa Puttkammer | (Italy) Cecilia Panato |

=== C1 classic ===
==== Men individual ====
| Year | 1st place, gold medalist(s) | 2nd place, silver medalist(s) | 3rd place, bronze medalist(s) |
|---|---|---|---|
| 1959 | (East Germany) Manfred Schubert | (Switzerland) Jean-Claude Tochon | (East Germany) Karl-Heinz Wozniak |
| 1961 | (East Germany) Manfred Schubert | (East Germany) Gert Kleinert | (France) Jean Grossman |
| 1963 | (Switzerland) Heinz Grobat | (East Germany) Manfred Schubert | (Czechoslovakia) Bohuslav Pospíchal |
| 1965 | (East Germany) Gert Kleinert | (Czechoslovakia) Jiří Vočka | (Switzerland) Heinz Grobat |
| 1967 | (Czechoslovakia) Petr Sodomka | (East Germany) Manfred Schubert | (Czechoslovakia) Jiří Vočka |
| 1969 | (France) Jean Boudehen | (Czechoslovakia) Petr Sodomka | (West Germany) Wolfgang Jogwer |
| 1971 | (Czechoslovakia) Petr Sodomka | (West Germany) Bernd Heinemann | (West Germany) Walter Gehlen |
| 1973 | (West Germany) Bernd Heinemann | (France) Jean-Luc Verger | (Czechoslovakia) Jiri Gut |
| 1975 | (France) Jean-Luc Verger | (West Germany) Josef Schumacher | (United States) Al Button |
| 1977 | (West Germany) Ernst Libuda | (France) Gilles Zok | (Czechoslovakia) Oldřich Blažíček |
| 1979 | (France) Jean-Luc Verger | (France) Gilles Zok | (Switzerland) René Paul |
| 1981 | (France) Gilles Zok | (France) Jean-Luc Verger | (United States) John Butler |
| 1983 | (France) Gilles Zok | (West Germany) Ernst Libuda | (Socialist Federal Republic of Yugoslavia) Srecko Masle |
| 1985 | (France) Gilles Zok | (Socialist Federal Republic of Yugoslavia) Sreko Masle | (France) Jean-Luc Bataille |
| 1987 | (France) Gilles Zok | (West Germany) Jörg Winfried | (West Germany) Ernst Libuda |
| 1989 | (Socialist Federal Republic of Yugoslavia) Andrej Jelenc | (Czechoslovakia) Vladimir Vala | (United Kingdom) Steve Wells |
| 1991 | (Socialist Federal Republic of Yugoslavia) Tomislav Crnković | (Socialist Federal Republic of Yugoslavia) Jodko Kancler | (Socialist Federal Republic of Yugoslavia) Andrej Jelenc |
| 1993 | (Italy) Vladi Panato | (Slovenia) Andrej Jelenc | (France) Jean-Luc Christin |
| 1995 | (Italy) Vladi Panato | (Germany) Stephan Stiefenhöfer | (France) Jérôme Bonnardel |
| 1996 | (Italy) Vladi Panato | (Germany) Olaf Schwarz | (Italy) Mirko Spelli |
| 1998 | (Italy) Vladi Panato | (Germany) Olaf Schwarz | (Germany) Stephan Stiefenhöfer |
| 2000 | (Italy) Vladi Panato | (France) Stéphane Santamaria | (Italy) Mirko Spelli |
| 2002 | (Italy) Vladi Panato | (Croatia) Tomislav Hohnjec | (France) Stéphane Santamaria |
| 2004 | (Croatia) Tomislav Hohnjec | (Italy) Vladi Panato | (Germany) Stephan Stiefenhöfer |
| 2006 | (Croatia) Emil Milihram | (Germany) Stephan Stiefenhöfer | (Italy) Vladi Panato |
| 2008 | (Croatia) Emil Milihram | (Germany) Normen Weber | (France) Guillaume Alzingre |
| 2010 | (Croatia) Emil Milihram | (Croatia) Tomislav Lepan | (Slovenia) Jošt Zakrajšek |
| 2012 | (Croatia) Emil Milihram | (France) Yann Claudepierre | (Czech Republic) Ondřej Rolenc |
| 2014 | (Croatia) Emil Milihram | (Czech Republic) Ondřej Rolenc | (Germany) Normen Weber |
| 2016 | (Croatia) Emil Milihram | (Germany) Normen Weber | (Czech Republic) Ondřej Rolenc |
| 2018 | (Czech Republic) Ondřej Rolenc | (France) Louis Lapointe | (Czech Republic) Marek Rygel |
| 2022 | (Czech Republic) Ondřej Rolenc | (France) Théo Viens | (France) Ancelin Gourjault |
| 2024 | (France) Théo Viens | (Czech Republic) Ondřej Rolenc | (France) Nicolas Sauteur |
| 2026 | (Croatia) Emil Milihram | (France) Nicolas Sauteur | (France) Théo Viens |

==== Women individual ====
| Year | 1st place, gold medalist(s) | 2nd place, silver medalist(s) | 3rd place, bronze medalist(s) |
|---|---|---|---|
| 2012 | (France) Julie Paoletti | (Czech Republic) Hana Peterková | (United Kingdom) Radka Felingerová |
| 2014 | (France) Marjolaine Hecquet | (Germany) Sabine Eichenberger | (Czech Republic) Radka Valíková |
| 2016 | (Czech Republic) Anežka Paloudová | (Czech Republic) Martina Satková | (Germany) Sabine Eichenberger |
| 2018 | (Czech Republic) Martina Satková | (Italy) Cecilia Panato | (Germany) Maren Lutz |
| 2022 | (Italy) Cecilia Panato | (Czech Republic) Marie Němcová | (France) Laura Fontaine |
| 2024 | (France) Laura Fontaine | (France) Ève Vitali-Guilbert | (Italy) Cecilia Panato |
| 2026 | (Italy) Cecilia Panato | (France) Laura Fontaine | (Italy) Alice Panato |

=== C1 sprint ===
==== Men individual ====
| Year | 1st place, gold medalist(s) | 2nd place, silver medalist(s) | 3rd place, bronze medalist(s) |
|---|---|---|---|
| 2002 | (Italy) Vladi Panato | (France) Harald Marzolf | (Czech Republic) Lukáš Novosad |
| 2004 | (France) Harald Marzolf | (Italy) Vladi Panato | (Germany) Stephan Stiefenhöfer |
| 2006 | (France) Guillaume Alzingre | (France) Stéphane Santamaria | (Germany) Stephan Stiefenhöfer |
| 2008 | (Italy) Vladi Panato | (Slovenia) Jošt Zakrajšek | (Czech Republic) Jan Šťastný |
| 2010 | (France) Yann Claudepierre | (Croatia) Emil Milihram | (France) Guillaume Alzingre |
| 2011 | (France) Guillaume Alzingre | (France) Yann Claudepierre | (Czech Republic) Ondřej Rolenc |
| 2012 | (France) Guillaume Alzingre | (Croatia) Igor Gojić | (Croatia) Emil Milihram |
| 2013 | (Germany) Normen Weber | (France) Guillaume Alzingre | (Slovenia) Blaž Cof |
| 2014 | (Czech Republic) Ondřej Rolenc | (France) Quentin Dazeur | (Czech Republic) Antonin Hales |
| 2015 | (France) Guillaume Alzingre | (Germany) Normen Weber | (Italy) Mattia Quintarelli |
| 2016 | (Czech Republic) Ondřej Rolenc | (Germany) Normen Weber | (Czech Republic) Vladimír Slanina |
| 2017 | (Czech Republic) Ondřej Rolenc | (Slovakia) Matej Beňuš | (Slovenia) Blaž Cof |
| 2018 | (Slovenia) Blaž Cof | (Czech Republic) Marek Rygel | (Czech Republic) Ondřej Rolenc |
| 2019 | (France) Louis Lapointe | (Czech Republic) Ondřej Rolenc | (Czech Republic) Vladimír Slanina |
| 2021 | (Czech Republic) Ondřej Rolenc | (France) Quentin Dazeur | (France) Charles Ferrion |
| 2022 | (France) Quentin Dazeur | (France) Nicolas Sauteur | (France) Ancelin Gourjault |
| 2023 | (France) Charles Ferrion | (Slovenia) Blaž Cof | (Czech Republic) František Salaj |
| 2024 | (Czech Republic) Matěj Vaněk | (France) Nicolas Sauteur | (Czech Republic) Ondřej Rolenc |
| 2025 | (Czech Republic) Matěj Vaněk | (France) Nicolas Sauteur | (France) Charles Ferrion |
| 2026 | (Czech Republic) Matěj Vaněk | (Slovakia) Jaromír Ivanecký | (France) Charles Ferrion |

==== Women individual ====
| Year | 1st place, gold medalist(s) | 2nd place, silver medalist(s) | 3rd place, bronze medalist(s) |
|---|---|---|---|
| 2011 | (Australia) Rosalyn Lawrence | (Czech Republic) Radka Valíková | (France) Mylène Blondel |
| 2012 | (France) Marjolaine Hecquet | (France) Julie Paoletti | (Czech Republic) Hana Peterková |
| 2013 | (France) Marjolaine Hecquet | (France) Julie Paoletti | (Germany) Sabine Eichenberger |
| 2014 | (Italy) Chiara Carbognin | (France) Marjolaine Hecquet | (Czech Republic) Radka Valíková |
| 2015 | (France) Claire Haab | (Czech Republic) Martina Satková | (Italy) Marlene Ricciardi |
| 2016 | (Czech Republic) Martina Satková | (France) Manon Durand | (France) Cindy Coat |
| 2017 | (France) Claire Haab | (Czech Republic) Martina Satková | (Slovenia) Marie Němcová |
| 2018 | (Italy) Cecilia Panato | (Slovenia) Marie Němcová | (Czech Republic) Martina Satková |
| 2019 | (Czech Republic) Martina Satková | (Italy) Cecilia Panato | (France) Elsa Gaubert |
| 2021 | (Italy) Cecilia Panato | (Czech Republic) Tereza Kneblová | (Czech Republic) Martina Satková |
| 2022 | (Czech Republic) Marie Němcová | (France) Laura Fontaine | (Italy) Cecilia Panato |
| 2023 | (France) Laura Fontaine | (Italy) Cecilia Panato | (Czech Republic) Marie Němcová |
| 2024 | (France) Laura Fontaine | (France) Elsa Gaubert | (Czech Republic) Anna Retková |
| 2025 | (France) Laura Fontaine | (Czech Republic) Anna Retková | (Slovakia) Katarína Kopúnová |
| 2026 | (France) Laura Fontaine | (Italy) Cecilia Panato | (Czech Republic) Marie Němcová |

=== C2 classic ===
==== Men's double ====
| Year | 1st place, gold medalist(s) | 2nd place, silver medalist(s) | 3rd place, bronze medalist(s) |
|---|---|---|---|
| 1959 | (France) Georges Turlier, Georges Dransart | (France) Jean Grossman, Eric Garnier | (Switzerland) Henri Kdrnka, Charles Dussuet |
| 1961 | (East Germany) Jürgen Noak, Siegfried Lück | (East Germany) Manfred Merkel, Günther Merkel | (Czechoslovakia) Zdeněk Valenta, Miroslav Stach |
| 1963 | (Czechoslovakia) Zdeněk Valenta, Miroslav Stach | (East Germany) Willi Landers, Ulrich Hippauf | (East Germany) Manfred Merkel, Günther Merkel |
| 1965 | (Czechoslovakia) Zdeněk Valenta, Miroslav Stach | (Austria) Helmut Schilhuber, Anton Biegel | (Czechoslovakia) Zdeněk Fifka, Jiří Dejl |
| 1967 | (Czechoslovakia) Zdeněk Fifka, Jiří Dejl | (West Germany) Norbert Schmidt, Hermann Roock | (East Germany) Willi Landers, Ulrich Hippauf |
| 1969 | (France) Alain Feuillette, Roland Chapuis | (France) Pierre Tournadre, Alain Enard | (France) Pierre-François Lefauconnier, Gilles Lefauconnier |
| 1971 | (France) Pierre-François Lefauconnier, Gilles Lefauconnier | (Austria) Heimo Müllneritsch, Helmar Steindl | (France) Jean-Paul Meynard, Claude Bost |
| 1973 | (France) Pierre-François Lefauconnier, Gilles Lefauconnier | (West Germany) Eckehard Rose, Jan Pospíšil | (West Germany) Norbert Schmidt, Hermann Roock |
| 1975 | (West Germany) Roland Schindler, Dieter Pioch | (France) Pierre-François Lefauconnier, Gilles Lefauconnier | (France) Jean-Paul Meynard, Claude Bost |
| 1977 | (West Germany) Roland Schindler, Dieter Pioch | (Switzerland) Peter Probst, Hardy Künzli | (Austria) Heimo Müllneritsch, Helmar Steindl |
| 1979 | (France) Michel Doux, Patrick Bunichon | (Switzerland) Peter Probst, Hardy Künzli | (France) Daniel Jacquet, Jean-Jacques Hayne |
| 1981 | (France) Daniel Jacquet, Jean-Jacques Hayne | (France) Michel Doux, Patrick Bunichon | (France) Jean-Luc Rigaut, Bernard Gilles |
| 1983 | (France) Hervé Madore, Françis Lieupart | (France) Philippe Thiel, Christian Bichat | (West Germany) Andreas Berngruber, Matthias Eckert |
| 1985 | (France) Jean-Luc Ponchon, François Durand | (France) Jean-Luc Rigaut, Bernard Gilles | (West Germany) Hans Proquitte, Peter Gonschior |
| 1987 | (France) Jean-Luc Ponchon, François Durand | (Socialist Federal Republic of Yugoslavia) Andrej Grobiša, Srečko Masle | (France) Bruno Puyfoulhoux, Claude Alaphilippe |
| 1989 | (Socialist Federal Republic of Yugoslavia) Andrej Grobiša, Srečko Masle | (France) Bruno Puyfoulhoux, Claude Alaphilippe | (France) Thierry Carlin, Eric Archambault |
| 1991 | (France) Thierry Carlin, Eric Archambault | (Socialist Federal Republic of Yugoslavia) Andrej Grobiša, Srecko Srečko MasleMasle | (Germany) Stefan Eich, Gregor Simon |
| 1993 | (France) Pierre Roos, Damien Faysse | (Slovakia) Vladimír Vala, Jaroslav Slúčik | (Germany) Stefan Eich, Gregor Simon |
| 1995 | (Slovakia) Vladimír Vala, Jaroslav Slúčik | (France) Pierre Roos, Damien Faysse | (Germany) Ulrich Knittel, Andreas Dajek |
| 1996 | (Slovakia) Vladimír Vala, Jaroslav Slúčik | (France) Pierre Roos, Damien Faysse | (Slovakia) Štefan Grega, Ján Šutek |
| 1998 | (Germany) Peter Müller, Gregor Simon | (Slovakia) Vladimír Vala, Jaroslav Slúčik | (France) Didier Baylag, Bertrand Baechler |
| 2000 | (Slovakia) Vladimír Vala, Jaroslav Slúčik | (Slovakia) Ján Šutek, Štefan Grega | (France) Philippe Aymard, Sebastien Pigeron |
| 2002 | (Slovakia) Vladimír Vala, Jaroslav Slúčik | (Slovakia) Ján Šutek, Štefan Grega | (Germany) Gregor Simon, Thomas Haas |
| 2004 | (Slovakia) Vladimír Vala, Jaroslav Slúčik | (Slovakia) Ján Šutek, Štefan Grega | (Germany) Gregor Simon, Thomas Haas |
| 2006 | (Germany) Ulrich Andrée, Patrick Driesch | (Czech Republic) David Lisický, Jan Vlček | (Germany) Tobias Trozska, Jannik Göbel |
| 2008 | (Germany) Ulrich Andrée, Patrick Driesch | (France) Olivier Pourteyron, Pascal Reyes | (France) Cyral Leblond, Stephane Santamaria |
| 2010 | (Slovenia) Luka Božic, Sašo Taljat | (Slovakia) Vladimír Vala, Jaroslav Slúčik | (Slovakia) Ján Šutek, Štefan Grega |
| 2012 | (France) Guillaume Alzingre, Yann Claudepierre | (Germany) Normen Weber, Rene Bruecker | (Germany) Lars Walter, Johannes Baumann |
| 2014 | (Czech Republic) Marek Rygel, Petr Veselý | (France) Louis Lapointe, Tony Debray | (Germany) Mathias Nies, Dominik Pesch |
| 2016 | (France) Louis Lapointe, Tony Debray | (France) Stéphane Santamaria, Quentin Dazeur | (Slovenia) Peter Žnidaršič, Luka Žganjar |
| 2018 | (France) Stéphane Santamaria, Quentin Dazeur | (France) Louis Lapointe, Tony Debray | (France) Ancelin Gourjault, Lucas Pazat |
| 2022 | (France) Stéphane Santamaria, Quentin Dazeur | (Czech Republic) Daniel Suchánek, Ondřej Rolenc | (France) Ancelin Gourjault, Nicolas Sauteur |
| 2024 | (France) Théo Viens, Nicolas Sauteur | (Czech Republic) Daniel Suchánek, Ondřej Rolenc | (France) Corentin Combe, Clément Monjanel |
| 2026 | (France) Nicolas Sauteur, Théo Viens | (France) Manoël Roussin, Tanguy Roussin | (Germany) Normen Weber, Ole Schwarz |

==== Women's double ====
| Year | 1st place, gold medalist(s) | 2nd place, silver medalist(s) | 3rd place, bronze medalist(s) |
|---|---|---|---|
| 2024 | (United Kingdom) Kerry Christie, Emma Christie | (France) Laura Fontaine, Ève Vitali-Guilbert | (France) Claire Bren, Lise Vinet |
| 2026 | (Italy) Cecilia Panato, Alice Panato | (Switzerland) Hannah Müller, Mona Clavadetscher | (United Kingdom) Kerry Christie, Emma Christie |

=== C2 sprint ===
==== Men's double ====
| Year | 1st place, gold medalist(s) | 2nd place, silver medalist(s) | 3rd place, bronze medalist(s) |
|---|---|---|---|
| 2002 | (France) Rémy Clermont, Guillaume Suply | (Slovakia) Vladimir Vala, Jaroslav Slúčik | (France) Jean-Marc Gauthier, Dominique Laurent |
| 2004 | (Slovakia) Vladimir Vala, Jaroslav Slúčik | (France) Cyril Leblond, David Silotto | (Slovakia) Ľuboš Šoška, Peter Šoška |
| 2006 | (France) David Silotto, Cyril Leblond | (Czech Republic) David Lisicky, Jan Vlcek | (France) Frédéric Momot, Michael Didier |
| 2008 | (Slovenia) Matus Kunhart, Peter Šoška | (France) Frédéric Momot, Michael Didier | (France) Cyril Leblond, Stéphane Santamaria |
| 2010 | (Slovenia) Sašo Taljat, Luka Božič | (France) Theodore Heitz, Thomas Peltriaux | (Germany) Lars Walter, Johannes Baumann |
| 2011 | (Germany) Lars Walter, Johannes Baumann | (France) Michael Cordier, Tom Bar | (France) Marc Brodiez, Pierre Le Clezio |
| 2012 | (France) Guillaume Alzingre, Yann Claudepierre | (France) Damien Guyonnet, Gaetan Guyonnet | (Czech Republic) Michal Sramek, Lukas Tomek |
| 2013 | (Slovenia) Sašo Taljat, Luka Božič | (Slovenia) Blaž Cof, Simon Hočevar | (Czech Republic) Jan Šťastný, Ondrej Rolenc |
| 2014 | (Slovenia) Peter Žnidaršič, Luka Zganjar | (Slovenia) Simon Hočevar, Blaž Cof | (Czech Republic) Marek Rygel, Petr Veselý |
| 2015 | (France) Damien Mareau, Pierre Troubady | (Slovenia) Peter Žnidaršič, Luka Zganjar | (Slovenia) Blaž Cof, Simon Hočevar |
| 2016 | (France) Quentin Dazeur, Stéphane Santamaria | (Slovenia) Peter Žnidaršič, Luka Zganjar | (France) Louis Lapointe, Tony Debray |
| 2017 | (France) Quentin Dazeur, Stéphane Santamaria | (France) Louis Lapointe, Tony Debray | (France) Damien Mareau, Pierre Troubady |
| 2018 | (France) Quentin Dazeur, Stéphane Santamaria | (France) Ancelin Gourjault, Lucas Pazat | (France) Louis Lapointe, Tony Debray |
| 2019 | (France) Louis Lapointe, Tony Debray | (Czech Republic) Marek Rygel, Petr Veselý | (France) Quentin Dazeur, Stéphane Santamaria |
| 2021 | (Czech Republic) Daniel Suchánek, Ondřej Rolenc | (France) Stéphane Santamaria, Quentin Dazeur | (France) Pierre Troubady, Hugues Moret |
| 2022 | (France) Stéphane Santamaria, Quentin Dazeur | (France) Pierre Troubady, Hugues Moret | (Czech Republic) Daniel Suchánek, Ondřej Rolenc |
| 2023 | (Czech Republic) Daniel Suchánek, Ondřej Rolenc | (France) Nicolas Sauteur, Théo Viens | (France) Hugues Moret, Pierre Troubady |
| 2024 | (France) Corentin Combe, Clément Monjanel | (France) Hugues Moret, Pierre Troubady | (France) Nicolas Sauteur, Théo Viens |
| 2025 | (France) Corentin Combe, Clément Monjanel | (Czech Republic) Matěj Vaněk, Karel Rašner | (France) Nicolas Sauteur, Théo Viens |
| 2026 | (France) Corentin Combe, Clément Monjanel | (France) Nicolas Sauteur, Théo Viens | (France) Manoël Roussin, Tanguy Roussin |

==== Women's double ====
| Year | 1st place, gold medalist(s) | 2nd place, silver medalist(s) | 3rd place, bronze medalist(s) |
|---|---|---|---|
| 2023 | (France) Elsa Gaubert, Margot Béziat | (Italy) Alice Panato, Cecilia Panato | (Switzerland) Hannah Müller, Mona Clavadetscher |
| 2024 | (France) Clara Gaubert, Elsa Gaubert | (Switzerland) Hannah Müller, Mona Clavadetscher | (France) Ève Vitali-Guilbert, Lisa Lebouc |
| 2025 | (Czech Republic) Kristina Novosadová, Marie Němcová | (France) Elsa Gaubert, Margot Béziat | (Italy) Alice Panato, Cecilia Panato |
| 2026 | (Italy) Alice Panato, Cecilia Panato | (France) Clara Gaubert, Elsa Gaubert | (Czech Republic) Pavla Jílková, Magdalena Malá |

== Multi-Medallists ==
=== Men individual ===
Still active

Top male paddlers with the best medal record including only individual events are listed below.

| # | Paddler | Country | Born | Events | From | To | 1st place, gold medalist(s) | 2nd place, silver medalist(s) | 3rd place, bronze medalist(s) | Tot. |
|---|---|---|---|---|---|---|---|---|---|---|
| 1 | Vladi Panato | Italy | 1972 | C1 classic and sprint | 1993 | 2018 | 8 | 2 | 1 | 11 |
| 2 | Vladimir Vala | Slovakia | 1963 | C1 classic + C2 classic and sprint | 1989 | 2010 | 6 | 5 | 0 | 11 |
| 3 | Jaroslav Slúčik | Slovakia | 1963 | C2 classic and sprint | 1993 | 2010 | 6 | 4 | 0 | 10 |
| 4 | Emil Milihram | Croatia | 1982 | C1 classic and sprint | 2000 | 2016 | 6 | 1 | 1 | 8 |
| 5 | Guillaume Alzingre | France | 1983 | C1 and C2 classic and sprint | 2004 | 2015 | 5 | 1 | 3 | 9 |
| 6 | Nejc Žnidarčič | Slovenia | 1984 | K1 classic and sprint | 2010 | 2014 | 4 | 5 | 2 | 11 |
| 7 | Stéphane Santamaria | France | 1977 | C1 and C2 classic and sprint | 2013 | 2019 | 4 | 3 | 4 | 11 |
| 8 | Ondřej Rolenc | Czech Republic | 1991 | C1 and C2 classic and sprint | 2008 | 2019 | 4 | 2 | 5 | 11 |
| 9 | Louis Lapointe | France | 1992 | C1 and C2 classic and sprint | 2014 | 2019 | 3 | 4 | 1 | 9 |

== See also ==
- Wildwater canoeing
- Wildwater Canoeing World Cup
- European Wildwater Championships
- International Canoe Federation
- ICF Canoe Sprint World Championships
- ICF Canoe Slalom World Championships
- ICF Canoe Marathon World Championships
- ICF Canoe Ocean Racing World Championships
- ICF Canoe Polo World Championships
