= 2002 Wildwater Canoeing World Championships =

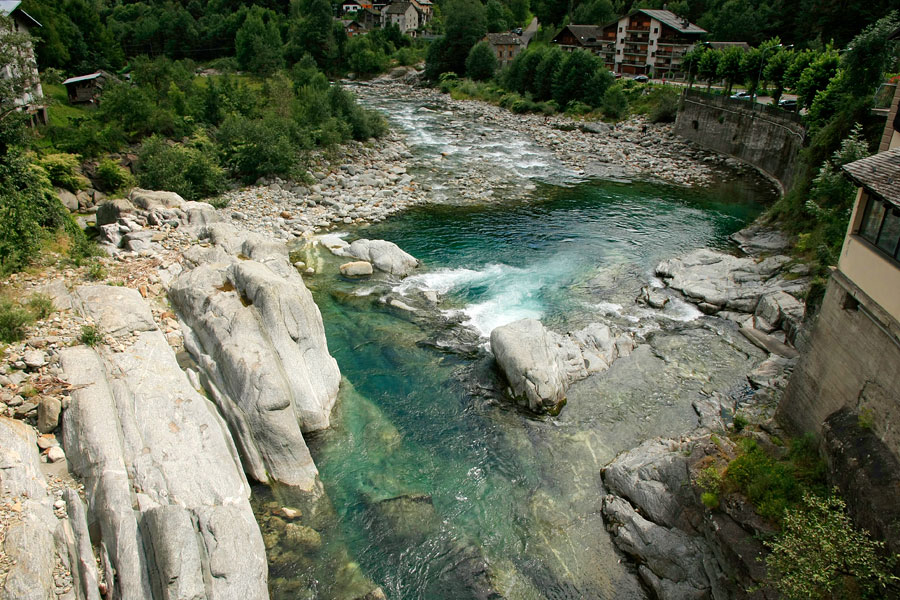
- The river Sesia, the location of the championships.
- Host city: Valsesia, Italy
- Level: Senior
- Events: 12

The 2002 Wildwater Canoeing World Championships was the 23rd edition of the global wildwater canoeing competition, Wildwater Canoeing World Championships, organised by the International Canoe Federation.

== Podiums ==
=== Classic ===
==== K1 ====
Men
Rank	Athlete	Country	Time
1st place, gold medalist(s)	Boris Saunier	France
2nd place, silver medalist(s)	Robert Pontarollo	Italy
3rd place, bronze medalist(s)	Kamil Mruzek	Czech Republic

Women
Rank	Athlete	Country	Time
1st place, gold medalist(s)	Michala Strnadova	Czech Republic
2nd place, silver medalist(s)	Nathalie Leclerc	France
3rd place, bronze medalist(s)	Ursula Profanter	Austria

Men team
Rank	Athlete	Country	Time
1st place, gold medalist(s)	Robert Knebel; Kamil Mruzek; Ales Marek	Czech Republic
2nd place, silver medalist(s)	Robert Pontarollo; Carlo Mercati; Francesco Arenare	Italy
3rd place, bronze medalist(s)	Markus Gigkler; Thomas Koelmann; Florian Wohlers	Germany

Women team
Rank	Athlete	Country	Time
1st place, gold medalist(s)	Nathalie Leclerc; Magali Thiebaut; Anne Blandine Crochet	France
2nd place, silver medalist(s)	Gudrun Willscheid; Sabine Füsser; Claudia Andree	Germany
3rd place, bronze medalist(s)	Michala Strnadova; Pavia Kneblova; Katerina Vacocova	Czech Republic

==== C1 ====
Men
Rank	Athlete	Country	Time
1st place, gold medalist(s)	Vladi Panato	Italy
2nd place, silver medalist(s)	Tomislav Hohnjec	Croatia
3rd place, bronze medalist(s)	Stéphane Santamaria	France

Men team
Rank	Athlete	Country	Time
1st place, gold medalist(s)	Tomislav Hohnjec; Goran Cokor; Emil Milihram	Croatia
2nd place, silver medalist(s)	Harald Marzholf; Stéphane Santamaria; Olivier Koskas	France
3rd place, bronze medalist(s)	Simon Hocevar; Borut Horvat; Josko Kancler	Slovenia

==== C2 ====
Men
Rank	Athlete	Country	Time
1st place, gold medalist(s)	Vladimir Vala; Jaroslav Slucik	Slovakia
2nd place, silver medalist(s)	Jan Sutek; Stefan Grega	Slovakia
3rd place, bronze medalist(s)	Gregor Simon; Thomas Haas	Germany

Men team
Rank	Athlete	Country	Time
1st place, gold medalist(s)	Vladimir Vala / Jaroslav Slucik; Grega / Sutek; Soska / Soska	Slovakia
2nd place, silver medalist(s)	Haas / Simon; Fahlbusch / Fahlbusch; Andree / Driesch	Germany
3rd place, bronze medalist(s)	Pecek / Raus; Petric / Guscik; Martincevic / Gojic	Croatia

=== Sprint ===
==== K1 ====
Men
Rank	Athlete	Country	Time
1st place, gold medalist(s)	Boris Saunier	France
2nd place, silver medalist(s)	Robert Pontarollo	Italy
3rd place, bronze medalist(s)	Rudy Gérard	France

Women
Rank	Athlete	Country	Time
1st place, gold medalist(s)	Michala Strnadova	Czech Republic
2nd place, silver medalist(s)	Uschi Profanter	Austria
3rd place, bronze medalist(s)	Nathalie Leclerc	France

==== C1 ====
Men
Rank	Athlete	Country	Time
1st place, gold medalist(s)	Vladi Panato	Italy
2nd place, silver medalist(s)	Harald Marzolf	France
3rd place, bronze medalist(s)	Lukas Novosad	Czech Republic

==== C2 ====
Men
Rank	Athlete	Country	Time
1st place, gold medalist(s)	Rémy Clermont; Guillaume Suply	France
2nd place, silver medalist(s)	Vladimir Vala; Jaroslav Slucik	Slovakia
3rd place, bronze medalist(s)	Jean-Marc Gauthier; Dominique Laurent	France

== Medal table ==
Rank	Country	1st place, gold medalist(s)	2nd place, silver medalist(s)	3rd place, bronze medalist(s)	Tot.
1	France	4	3	4	11
2	Czech Republic	3	0	3	6
3	Italy	2	3	0	5
4	Slovakia	2	2	0	3
5	Croatia	1	1	1	3
6	Germany	0	2	2	4
7	Austria	0	1	1	2
8	Slovenia	0	0	1	2
Total		12	12	12	36

== See also ==
- Wildwater canoeing
