= 1979 Wildwater Canoeing World Championships =

- Host city: Desbiens, Canada
- Level: Senior
- Events: 8

The 1979 Wildwater Canoeing World Championships was the 11th edition of the global wildwater canoeing competition, Wildwater Canoeing World Championships, organised by the International Canoe Federation.

== Podiums ==
=== K1 ===
Men
Rank	Athlete	Country	Time
1st place, gold medalist(s)	Jean-Pierre Burny	Belgium
2nd place, silver medalist(s)	Robert Campbell	United Kingdom
3rd place, bronze medalist(s)	Claude Bénézit	France

Women
Rank	Athlete	Country	Time
1st place, gold medalist(s)	Dominique Gardette	France
2nd place, silver medalist(s)	Gisela Steigerwald	West Germany
3rd place, bronze medalist(s)	Renate Prijon	West Germany

Men team
Rank	Athlete	Country	Time
1st place, gold medalist(s)	Degenhard Pfeiffer; Konrad Hollerieth; Jörg Winfried	West Germany
2nd place, silver medalist(s)	Jean-Marc Dauge; Henry Estanguet; Claude Bénézit	France
3rd place, bronze medalist(s)	Bob Campbell; Dave Taylor; Jeremy Hibble	United Kingdom

Women team
Rank	Athlete	Country	Time
1st place, gold medalist(s)	Cathy Hearn; Carol Fisher; Leslie Klein	United States
2nd place, silver medalist(s)	Ulrike Deppe; Gisela Grothaus; Renate Prijon	West Germany
3rd place, bronze medalist(s)	Hillary Peacock; Jill Adams; Susan Hornsby	United Kingdom

=== C1 ===
Men
Rank	Athlete	Country	Time
1st place, gold medalist(s)	Jean-Luc Verger	France
2nd place, silver medalist(s)	Gilles Zok	France
3rd place, bronze medalist(s)	Paul René	Switzerland

Men team
Rank	Athlete	Country	Time
1st place, gold medalist(s)	François Bonnet; Gilles Zok; Jean-Luc Verger	France
2nd place, silver medalist(s)	Chuck Lyda; Kent Ford; John Evans	United States
3rd place, bronze medalist(s)	Klaus Ernst; Ernst Libuda; Rainer Pioch	West Germany

=== C2 ===
Men
Rank	Athlete	Country	Time
1st place, gold medalist(s)	Michel Doux; Patrick Bunichon	France
3rd place, bronze medalist(s)	Daniel Jacquet; Jean-Jacques Hayne	France
2nd place, silver medalist(s)	Peter Probst; Hardy Künzli	Switzerland

Men team
Rank	Athlete	Country	Time
1st place, gold medalist(s)	Doux / Bunichon; Hayne / Jacquet; Feuillette / Madore	France
2nd place, silver medalist(s)	Schmidt / Roock; Schumacher / Runo; Gefeller / Berngruber	West Germany
3rd place, bronze medalist(s)	Wyss / Wyss; Zimmermann / Fürst; Künzli / Probst	Switzerland

== Medal table ==
Rank	Country	1st place, gold medalist(s)	2nd place, silver medalist(s)	3rd place, bronze medalist(s)	Tot.
1	France	5	2	2	9
2	West Germany	1	3	2	6
3	United States	1	1	0	2
4	Belgium	1	0	0	1
5	United Kingdom	0	1	2	3
-	Switzerland	0	1	2	3
Total		8	8	8	24

== See also ==
- Wildwater canoeing
