= 1969 Wildwater Canoeing World Championships =

- Host city: Bourg-Saint-Maurice, France
- Level: Senior
- Events: 10

The 1969 Wildwater Canoeing World Championships was the 6th edition of the global wildwater canoeing competition, Wildwater Canoeing World Championships, organised by the International Canoe Federation.

== Results ==
=== K1 classic ===
==== Men individual ====
Rank	Athlete	Country	Time
1st place, gold medalist(s)	Jean-Pierre Burny	Belgium	
2nd place, silver medalist(s)	Kurt Presslmayr	Austria	
3rd place, bronze medalist(s)	Jochen Schwarz	West Germany	

==== Women individual ====
Rank	Athlete	Country	Time
1st place, gold medalist(s)	Ludmila Polesná	Czechoslovakia	
2nd place, silver medalist(s)	Ulrike Deppe	West Germany	
3rd place, bronze medalist(s)	Annemie Amslinger	West Germany	

==== Men team ====
Rank	Athlete	Country	Time
1st place, gold medalist(s)	Lothar Zentgraf; Bernd Kast; Jochen Schwarz	West Germany	
2nd place, silver medalist(s)	Jean-Pierre Archambot; François Bateille; Michel Magdinier	France	
3rd place, bronze medalist(s)	Helmut Bernhard; Manfred Pock; Kurt Presslmayr	Austria	

==== Women team ====
Rank	Athlete	Country	Time
1st place, gold medalist(s)	Bohumila Kapplová; Růžena Novotná; Ludmila Polesná	Czechoslovakia	
2nd place, silver medalist(s)	Annemie Amslinger; Ulrike Deppe; Bärbel Körner	West Germany	
3rd place, bronze medalist(s)	Delphin Aubron; Gabrielle Lutz; Isabelle Peyron	France	

=== C1 classic ===
==== Men individual ====
Rank	Athlete	Country	Time
1st place, gold medalist(s)	Jean Boudehen	France	
2nd place, silver medalist(s)	Peter Sodomka	Czechoslovakia	
3rd place, bronze medalist(s)	Wolfgang Jogwer	West Germany	

==== Men team ====
Rank	Athlete	Country	Time
1st place, gold medalist(s)	Walter Gehlen; Bernd Heinemann; Wolfgang Jogwer	West Germany	
2nd place, silver medalist(s)	Jiří Vočka; Zdeněk Fifka; Peter Sodomka	Czechoslovakia	
3rd place, bronze medalist(s)	Jean Boudehen; Guy Huteau; Roger Debiol	France	

=== C2 classic ===
==== Men individual ====
Rank	Athlete	Country	Time
1st place, gold medalist(s)	Alain Feuillette; Roland Chapuis	France	
2nd place, silver medalist(s)	Pierre Tournadre; Alain Enard	France	
3rd place, bronze medalist(s)	Pierre-François Lefauconnier; Gilles Lefauconnier	France	

==== Men team ====
Rank	Athlete	Country	Time
1st place, gold medalist(s)	Tournadre / Enard; Feuillette / Chapuis; Lefauconnier / Lefauconnier	France	
2nd place, silver medalist(s)	Wenzel / Hess; Roock / Schmidt; Spengler / Stock	West Germany	
3rd place, bronze medalist(s)	Janoušek / Horyna; Měšťan / Měšťan; Sklenář / Dejl	Czechoslovakia	

==== Mixen individual ====
Rank	Athlete	Country	Time
1st place, gold medalist(s)	Hanneliese Spitz; Helmut Ramelov	Austria	
2nd place, silver medalist(s)	Jitka Traplová; Milan Svoboda	Czechoslovakia	
3rd place, bronze medalist(s)	August Lasseur; Anne Gauert	West Germany	

==== Mixed team ====
Rank	Athlete	Country	Time
1st place, gold medalist(s)	Tregaro / Tregaro; Gaud / Dransart; Ravilly / Guilbaud	France	
2nd place, silver medalist(s)	Křížková / Koudela; Traplová / Svoboda; Výtisková / Výtisk	Czechoslovakia	
3rd place, bronze medalist(s)	Wright / Liebman; Southworth / Southworth; Fawcett / Fawcett	United States	

== See also ==
- Wildwater canoeing
