= Jander =

Jander is a name. It may refer to:

== Given name ==
- Jander (footballer) (born 1988), Jander Ribeiro Santana, Brazilian football left-back

== Surname ==
- Gerhart Jander (1892-1961), German inorganic chemist
- Gundula Jander (fl. 1965), German canoeist
- Georg Jander (fl. 1996-present), American botanist
- Caspar Jander (born 2003), German football midfielder
