= Malaterre =

Malaterre is a surname. Notable people with the surname include:

- Jacques Malaterre, French film director
- Sadaf Malaterre (born 1969), Pakistani fashion designer
- Sixtine Malaterre (born 1987), French canoeist
