= Loïc Vynisale =

French canoeist

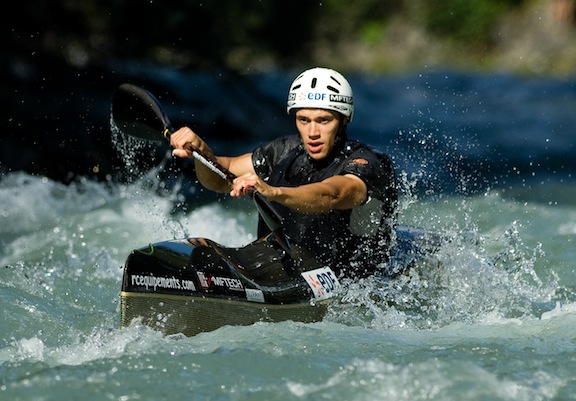

Personal information
- Nationality: French
- Born: 10 March 1986 (age 40) Cahors, France

Sport
- Sport: Canoeing
- Event: Wildwater canoeing
- Club: Strasbourg Eaux Vives

Loïc Vynisale (born 10 March 1986) is a French male canoeist who won medals at senior level at the Wildwater Canoeing World Championships.
