= Tomislav Crnković (canoeist) =

Croatian canoeist

Personal information
- Nationality: Croatian
- Born: 1956 (age 69–70) Zagreb, Croatia

Sport
- Sport: Canoeing
- Event: Wildwater canoeing
- Club: Kajakaski Savez Zagreb
Medal record
Event	1st	2nd	3rd
World Championships	1	0	0

Tomislav Crnković (born 1956) is a former Croatian male canoeist who won a world championship at senior level at the Wildwater Canoeing World Championships.

Crnković is the Chairman of the ICF Whitewater Committee.
