= Nathalie Gastineau =

French canoeist

Personal information
- Nationality: French
- Born: 23 April 1981 (age 45) France

Sport
- Sport: Canoeing
- Event: Wildwater canoeing
Medal record
| Event | 1st | 2nd | 3rd |
|---|---|---|---|
| World Championships | 4 | 2 | 1 |
| European Championships | 1 | 1 | 0 |
| Total | 5 | 3 | 1 |

Nathalie Gastineau (born 23 April 1981) is a former French female canoeist who won the Wildwater Canoeing World Championships at a senior level.
