= Guillaume Alzingre =

French canoeist

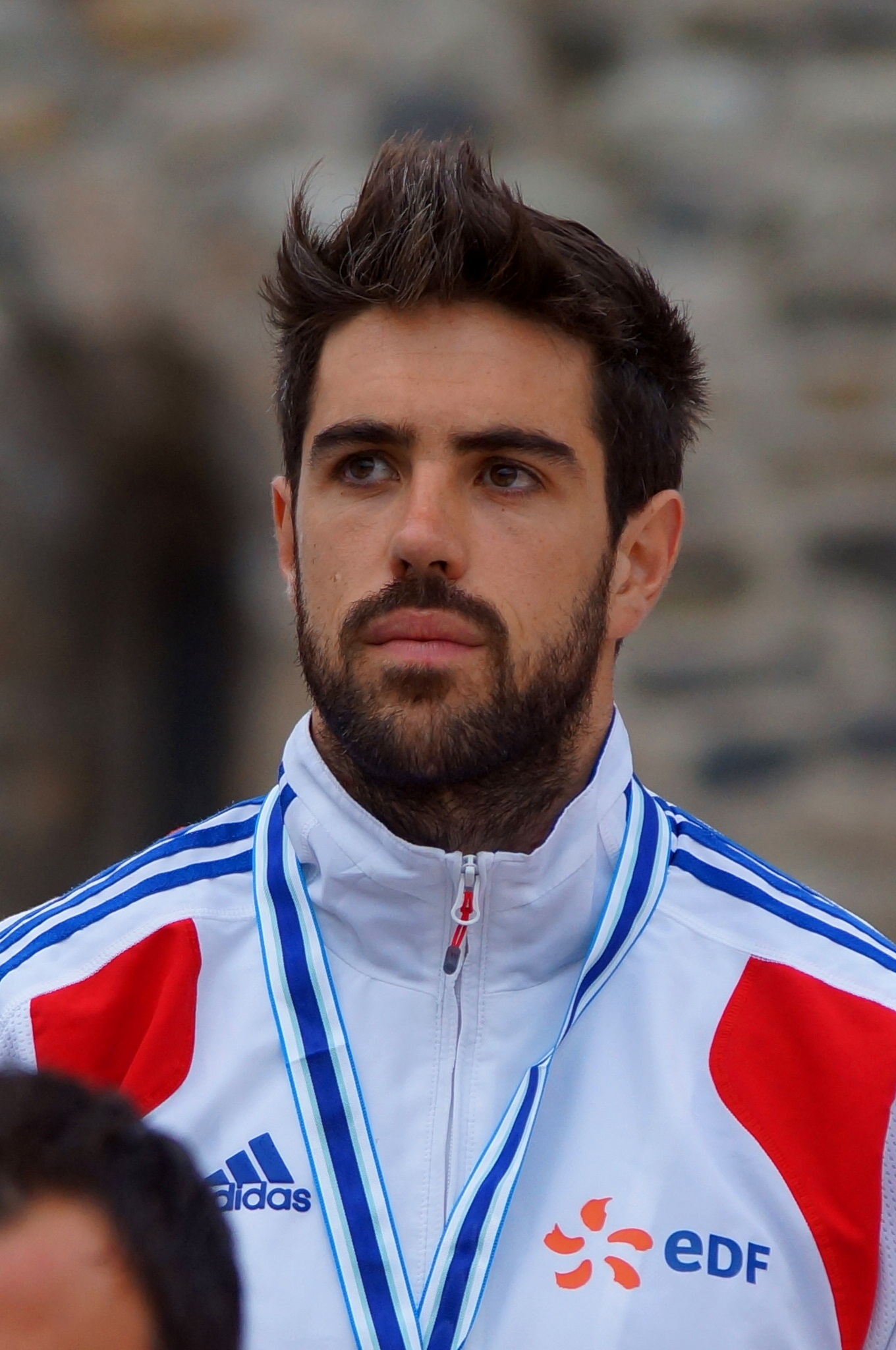

Personal information
- Nationality: French
- Born: 21 December 1983 (age 42) Senlis, France
- Height: 1.79 m (5 ft 10 in)
- Weight: 76 kg (168 lb)

Sport
- Sport: Canoeing
- Event: Wildwater canoeing
- Club: Club nautique de Baud
- Coached by: Nicolas Laly
- Retired: 2016
Medal record
Event	1st	2nd	3rd
World Championships	13	4	3
European Championships	7	4	4
Total	20	8	7

Guillaume Alzingre (born 21 December 1983) is a former French male canoeist who won 22 medals at senior level at the Wildwater Canoeing World Championships.

== Medals at the World Championships ==
Of his 20 medals at the world championships, 9 were at individual level and 11 at team level.

Senior

Year	C1 sprint individual			C1 sprint team			C2 sprint individual			C2 sprint team			C1 classic individual			C1 classic team			C2 classic individual			C2 classic team		
Year	1st place, gold medalist(s)	2nd place, silver medalist(s)	3rd place, bronze medalist(s)	1st place, gold medalist(s)	2nd place, silver medalist(s)	3rd place, bronze medalist(s)	1st place, gold medalist(s)	2nd place, silver medalist(s)	3rd place, bronze medalist(s)	1st place, gold medalist(s)	2nd place, silver medalist(s)	3rd place, bronze medalist(s)	1st place, gold medalist(s)	2nd place, silver medalist(s)	3rd place, bronze medalist(s)	1st place, gold medalist(s)	2nd place, silver medalist(s)	3rd place, bronze medalist(s)	1st place, gold medalist(s)	2nd place, silver medalist(s)	3rd place, bronze medalist(s)	1st place, gold medalist(s)	2nd place, silver medalist(s)	3rd place, bronze medalist(s)
2004	0	0	0				0	0	0				0	0	0	0	1	0	0	0	0	0	0	0
2006	1	0	0				0	0	0				0	0	0	0	0	0	0	0	0	0	0	0
2008	0	0	0	0	0	0	0	0	0	0	0	0	0	0	1	0	0	0	0	0	0	0	0	0
2010	0	0	1	1	0	0	0	0	0	0	0	0	0	0	0	0	0	1	0	0	0	0	0	0
2011	1	0	0	0	1	0	0	0	0	0	1	0												
2012	1	0	0	1	0	0	1	0	0	1	0	0	0	0	0	0	0	0	1	0	0	0	0	0
2013	0	1	0	0	0	0	1	0	0	1	0	0												
2014	0	0	0	0	0	0	0	0	0	0	0	0	0	0	0	1	0	0	0	0	0	0	0	0
2015	1	0	0	0	0	0	1	0	0	0	0	0												
Tot.	4	1	1	2	1	0	3	0	0	2	1	0	0	0	1	1	1	1	1	0	0	0	0	0
