= Julie Paoletti =

French canoeist

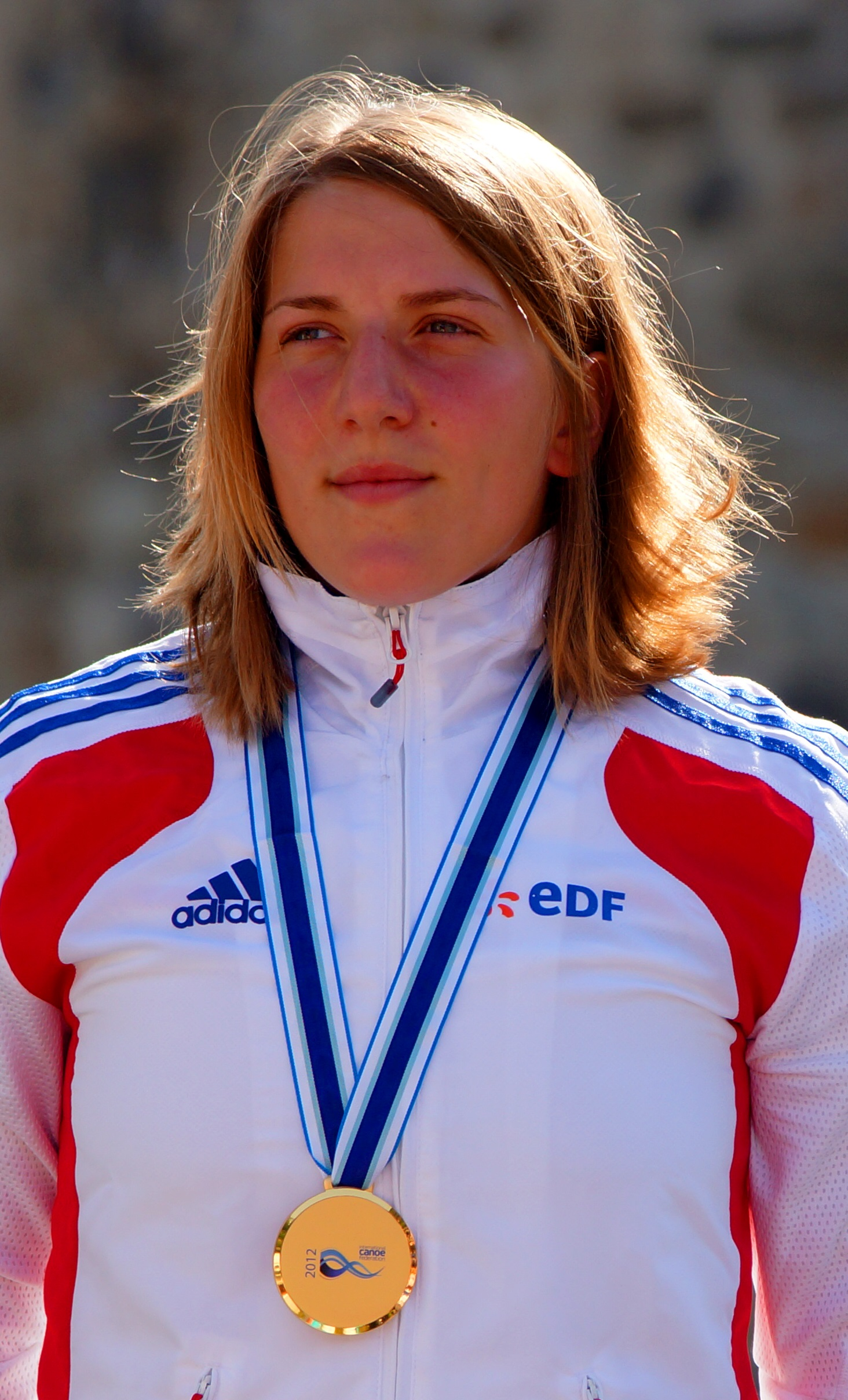

Personal information
- Nationality: French
- Born: 20 December 1991 (age 34) France

Sport
- Sport: Canoeing
- Event: Wildwater canoeing
Medal record
Event	1st	2nd	3rd
World Championships	1	2	0
European Championships	1	1	0
Total	2	3	0

Julie Paoletti (born 20 December 1991) is a French female canoeist who won medals at senior level of the Wildwater Canoeing World Championships and European Wildwater Championships.
