= Alke Overbeck =

German canoeist

Personal information
- Nationality: German
- Born: 7 August 1988 (age 37) Germany

Sport
- Sport: Canoeing
- Event: Wildwater canoeing
Medal record
Event	1st	2nd	3rd
World Championships	4	6	3
European Championships	3	4	2
Total	7	10	5

Alke Overbeck (born 7 August 1988) is a German female canoeist who won 22 medals at senior level at the Wildwater Canoeing World Championships and European Wildwater Championships.
