= Elsa Gaubert =

French canoeist

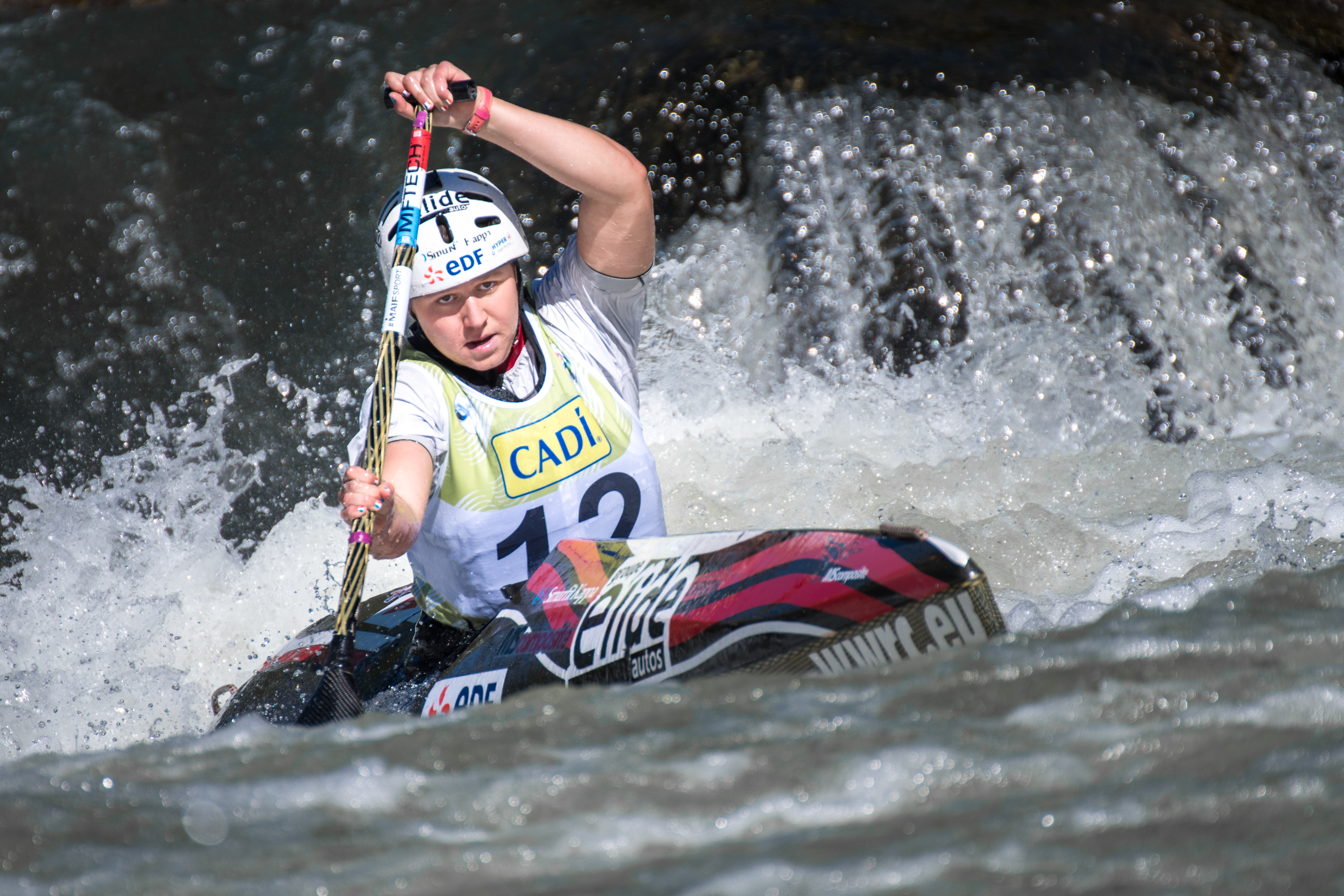
- Gaubert in 2019

Personal information
- Nationality: French
- Born: 21 March 2000 (age 26) France

Sport
- Sport: Canoeing
- Event: Wildwater canoeing
- Club: Canoë-kayak du Teich
Medal record
Event	1st	2nd	3rd
World Championships	2	0	1

Elsa Gaubert (born 21 March 2000) is a French female canoeist who won three medals at senior level at the Wildwater Canoeing World Championships.

== Medals at the World Championships ==
Senior

Year	1st place, gold medalist(s)	2nd place, silver medalist(s)	3rd place, bronze medalist(s)
2019	2	0	1
