= Vladimír Vala =

Slovak canoeist

Personal information
- Nationality: Slovak
- Born: 12 April 1963 (age 63) Slovakia

Sport
- Sport: Wildwater canoeing
- Event: C2, C1
Medal record
Men's wildwater canoeing
World Championships
Representing Czechoslovakia
Silver medal – second place	1989 Savage River	C1 classic
Representing Slovakia
Gold medal – first place	1995 Bala	C2 classic
Gold medal – first place	1996 Landeck	C2 classic
Gold medal – first place	2000 Treignac	C2 classic
Gold medal – first place	2002 Valsesia	C2 classic
Gold medal – first place	2004 Garmisch-Partenkirchen	C2 classic
Gold medal – first place	2004 Garmisch-Partenkirchen	C2 sprint
Silver medal – second place	1993 Mezzana	C2 classic
Silver medal – second place	1998 Garmisch-Partenkirchen	C2 classic
Silver medal – second place	2010 Spain	C2 classic
Silver medal – second place	2002 Valsesia	C2 sprint

Vladimir Vala (born 12 April 1963) is a former Slovak male Wildwater canoeist who competed from the 1980s to 2010s, specializing primarily in the C2 discipline, where he was partnered by Jaroslav Slúčik.

He is a five time world champion in the C2 classic discipline and one time world champion in C2 sprint at the Wildwater Canoeing World Championships.

== World Cup titles ==
Vala won seven editions of the Wildwater Canoeing World Cup in C2 classic.

Season	
Season	Discipline
1992	C2 classic
1995	C2 classic
1998	C2 classic
1999	C2 classic
2003	C2 classic
2004	C2 classic
2005	C2 classic
