= Hugues Moret =

French canoeist

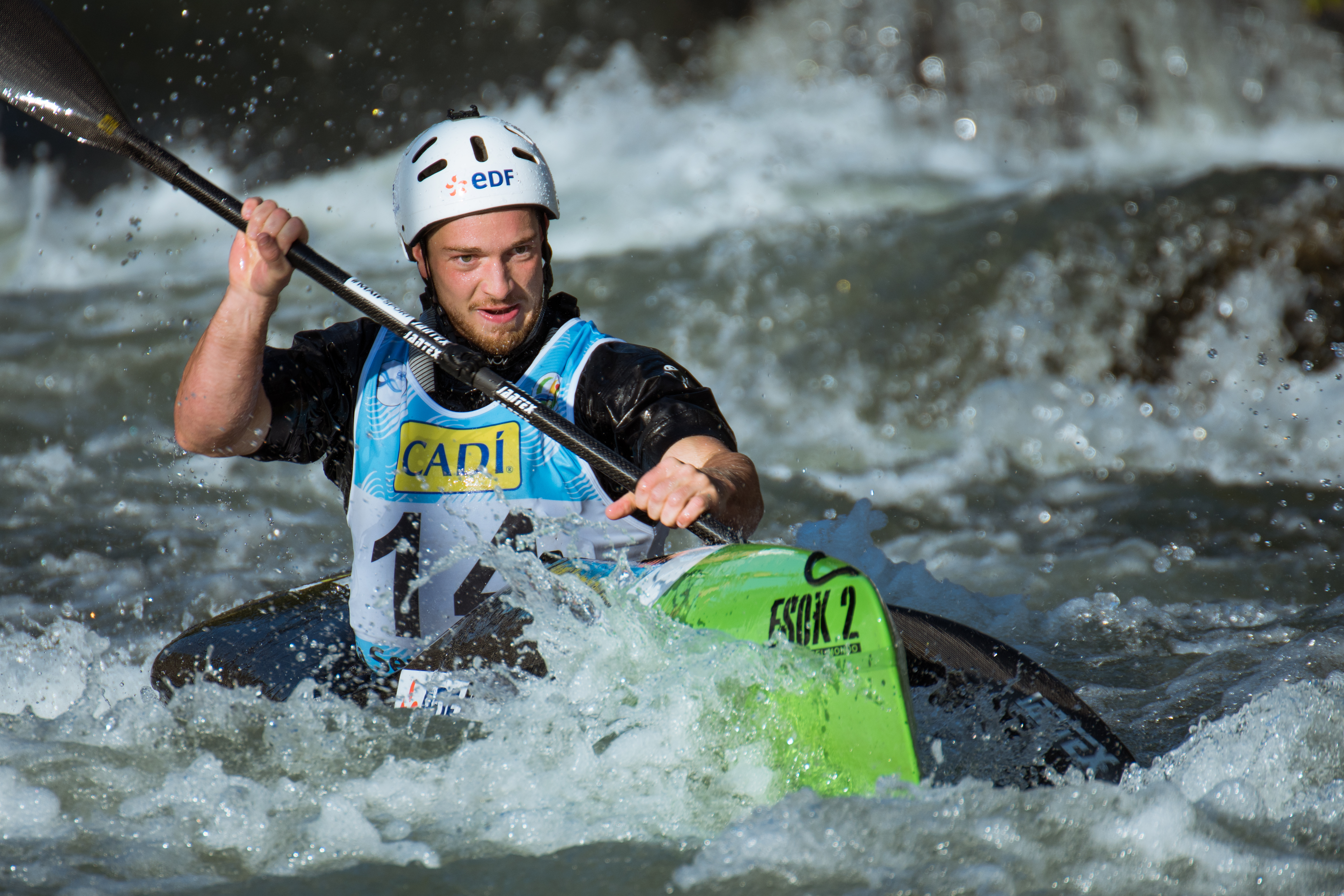
- Moret in 2019

Personal information
- Born: 21 April 1997 (age 29) France

Sport
- Sport: Canoeing
- Event: Wildwater canoeing
Medal record
Event	1st	2nd	3rd
World Championships	0	1	1

Hugues Moret (born 21 April 1997) is a French male canoeist who won two medals at senior level at the Wildwater Canoeing World Championships.

== Medals at the World Championships ==
Senior

Year	1st place, gold medalist(s)	2nd place, silver medalist(s)	3rd place, bronze medalist(s)
2019	0	1	1
