= Mirko Spelli =

Italian canoeist

Personal information
- Nationality: Italian
- Born: 1 March 1973 (age 53) Città di Castello, Italy

Sport
- Sport: Canoeing
- Event: Wildwater canoeing
- Club: Canoa Club Città di Castello
Medal record
Event	1st	2nd	3rd
World Championships	1	1	3
European Championships	0	1	0
Total	1	2	3

Mirko Spelli (born 1 March 1973) is a former Italian male canoeist, who won several medals at senior level of the Wildwater Canoeing World Championships and European Wildwater Championships.
