= Ben Oakley (canoeist) =

British canoeist

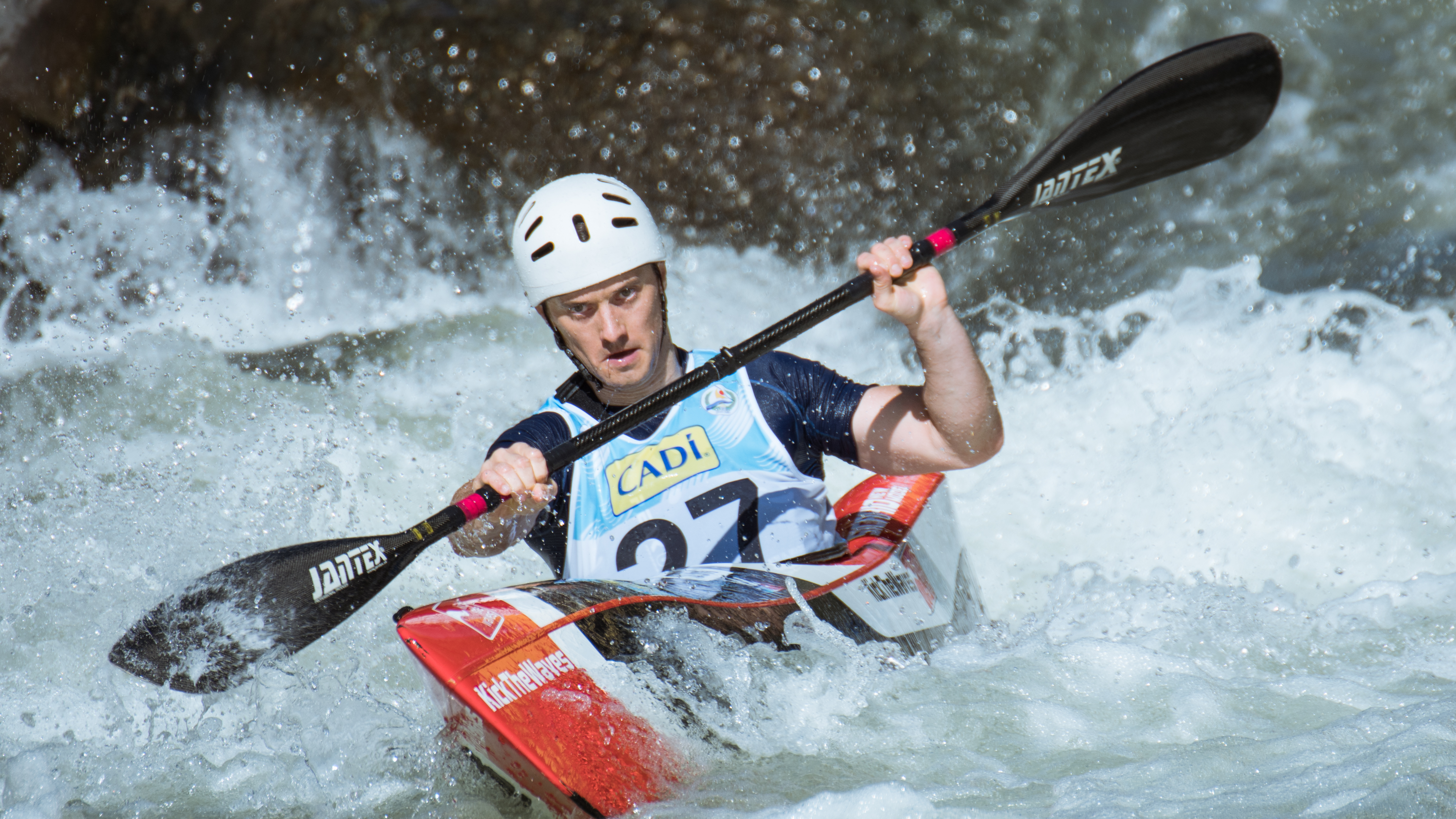
- Oakley in 2019

Personal information
- Full name: Benjamin Oakley
- Nationality: British
- Born: 7 July 1988 (age 37) United Kingdom

Sport
- Sport: Canoeing
- Event: Wildwater canoeing
Medal record
Event	1st	2nd	3rd
World Championships	0	0	1

Ben Oakley (born 5 July 1988) is a British male canoeist who won a bronze medal at senior level at the Wildwater Canoeing World Championships.
