= Claire Bren =

French canoeist (born 1988)

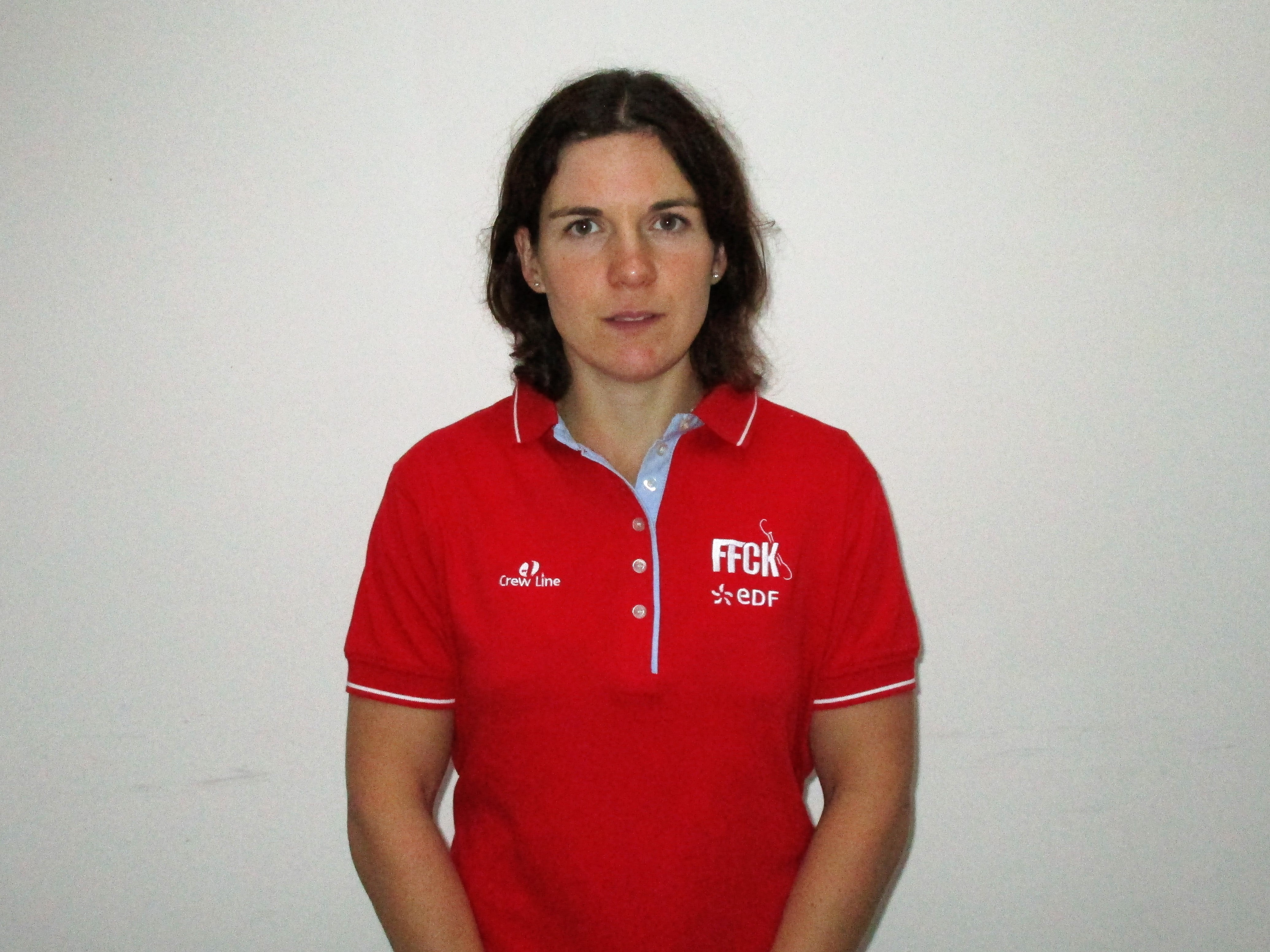
- Bren in 2016

Personal information
- Nationality: French
- Born: 17 September 1988 (age 37) Chartres, France

Sport
- Sport: Canoeing
- Event: Wildwater canoeing
- Club: Canoë Kayak Vivonne
Medal record
Event	1st	2nd	3rd
World Championships	8	3	2
European Championships	2	2	2
Total	10	5	4

Claire Bren (born 17 September 1988) is a French female canoeist who won 13 medals at senior level at the Wildwater Canoeing World Championships.
