= Anne-Blandine Crochet =

French canoeist

Personal information
- Nationality: French
- Born: 8 August 1978 (age 47) France

Sport
- Sport: Canoeing
- Event: Wildwater canoeing
Medal record
Event	1st	2nd	3rd
World Championships	4	0	3

Anne-Blandine Crochet (married Desmerger; born 8 August 1978) is a former French female canoeist who won at senior level the Wildwater Canoeing World Championships.

== Medals at the World Championships ==
Crochet won seven medals at senior level at the Wildwater Canoeing World Championships.

Senior

Year	1st place, gold medalist(s)	2nd place, silver medalist(s)	3rd place, bronze medalist(s)
1998	1	0	1
2000	1	0	1
2002	1	0	0
2005	1	0	1
