= Marie Němcová =

Czech canoeist

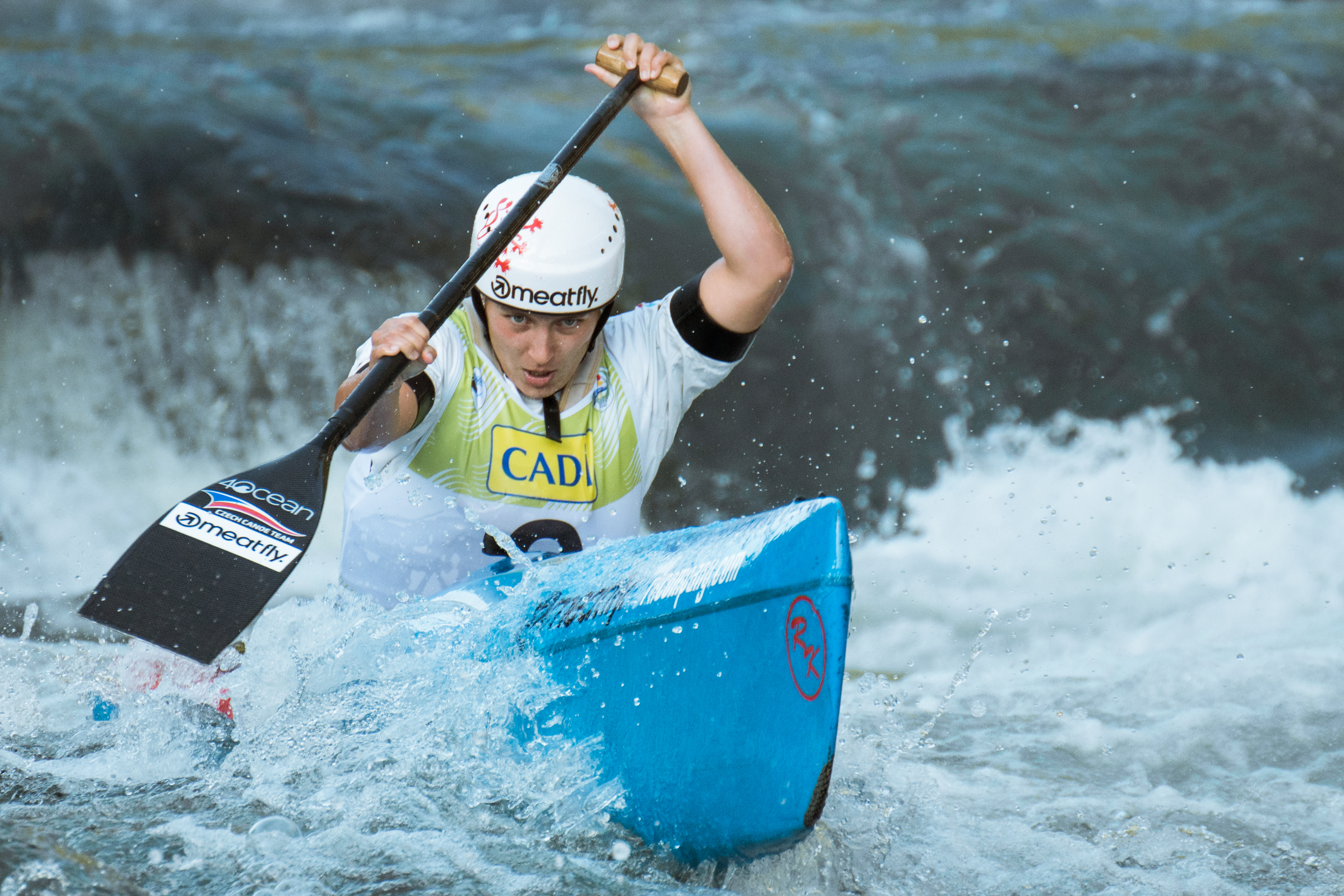
- Němcová in 2019

Personal information
- Nationality: Czech
- Born: 2 December 2000 (age 25) Czech Republic

Sport
- Sport: Canoeing
- Event: Wildwater canoeing
Medal record
| Event | 1st | 2nd | 3rd |
|---|---|---|---|
| World Championships | 3 | 2 | 1 |

Marie Němcová (born 2 December 2000) is a Czech female canoeist who won six medals at senior level at the Wildwater Canoeing World Championships.

== Medals at the World Championships ==
Senior

| Year | 1st place, gold medalist(s) | 2nd place, silver medalist(s) | 3rd place, bronze medalist(s) |
|---|---|---|---|
| 2017 | 2 | 0 | 1 |
| 2018 | 1 | 1 | 0 |
| 2019 | 0 | 1 | 0 |
