= Heide Schröter =

German canoeist

Personal information
- Nationality: German
- Born: 1941 (age 84–85) West Germany

Sport
- Sport: Canoeing
- Event: Wildwater canoeing
Medal record
Representing West Germany
World Championships
Bronze medal – third place	1967 Lipno	K-1 team

Heide Schröter is a former West German slalom canoeist who competed in the late 1960s. She won a bronze medal in the K-1 team event at the 1967 ICF Canoe Slalom World Championships in Lipno.

She also won at senior level the Wildwater Canoeing World Championships.
