= Chiara Carbognin =

Italian canoeist

Personal information
- Nationality: Italian
- Born: 1 December 1996 (age 29) Pescantina, Italy

Sport
- Sport: Canoeing
- Event: Wildwater canoeing
- Club: Canoa Club Pescantina
Medal record
Event	1st	2nd	3rd
World Championships	1	0	0

Chiara Carbognin (born 1 December 1996) is an Italian female canoeist who won a gold medal in C1 sprint at individual senior level at the Wildwater Canoeing World Championships in 2014 at 18 years old.
