= Tobias Bong =

German canoeist

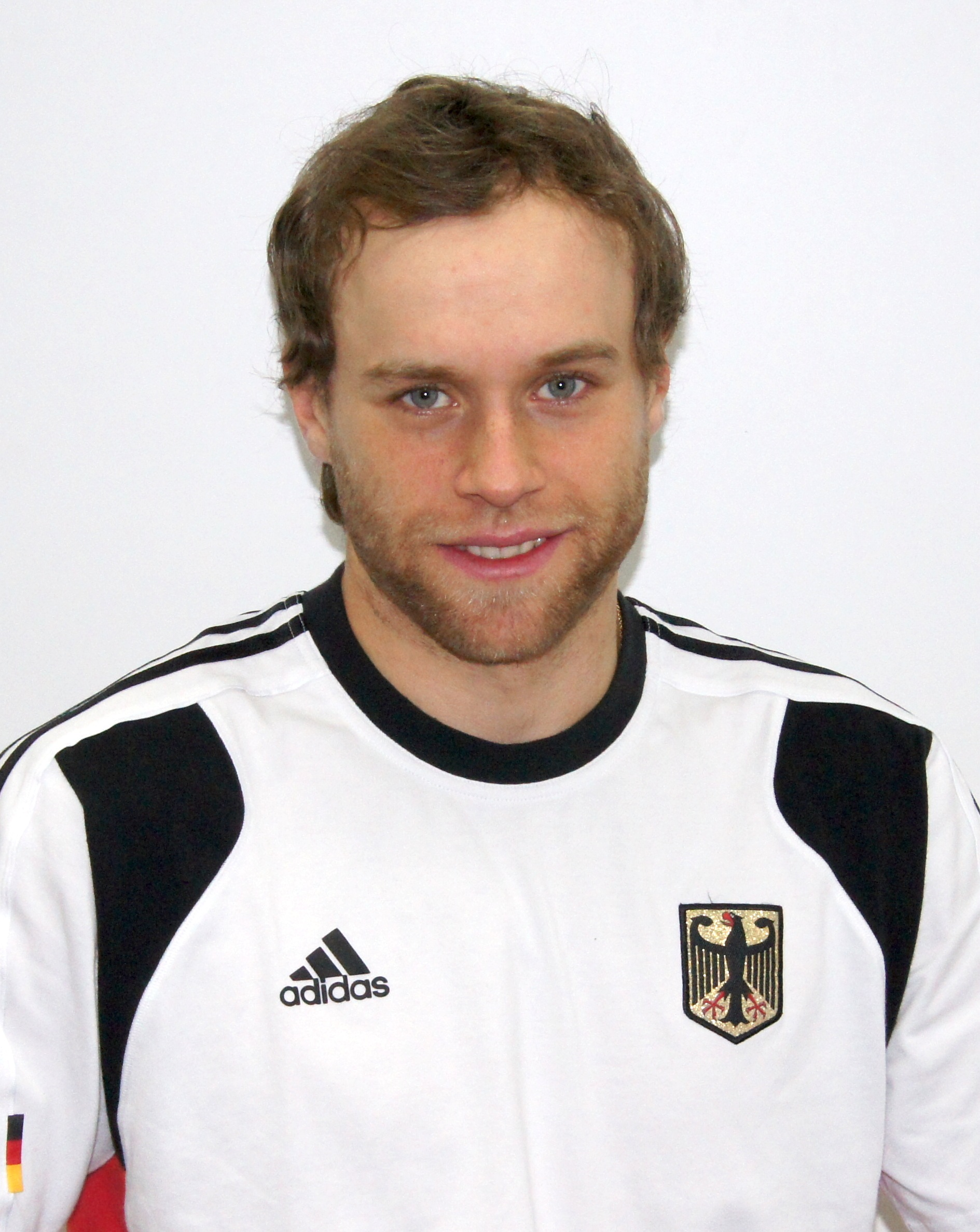

Personal information
- Nationality: German
- Born: 23 March 1988 (age 38) Cologne, Germany

Sport
- Sport: Canoeing
- Event: Wildwater canoeing
Medal record
Event	1st	2nd	3rd
World Championships	1	3	2
European Championships	1	2	1
Total	2	5	3

Tobias Bong (born 23 March 1988) is a former German male canoeist who won medals at senior level the Wildwater Canoeing World Championships.
