= Radka Felingerová =

British canoeist

Personal information
- Nationality: British
- Born: 1978 (age 47–48) Czech Republic

Sport
- Sport: Canoeing
- Event: Wildwater canoeing
Medal record
Event	1st	2nd	3rd
World Championships	0	1	1

Radka Felingerová (born 1978) is a former born Czech British female canoeist who won two medals at individual senior level at the Wildwater Canoeing World Championships.
