= Karin Wirz =

German canoeist

Personal information
- Nationality: German
- Born: 26 September 1963 (age 62) Germany

Sport
- Sport: Canoeing
- Event: Wildwater canoeing

Karin Wirz (born 26 September 1963) is a former German female canoeist who won at senior level the Wildwater Canoeing World Championships.
