= Achim Overbeck =

German canoeist

Personal information
- Nationality: German
- Born: 16 June 1983 (age 43) Braunschweig, Germany

Sport
- Sport: Canoeing
- Event: Wildwater canoeing

Achim Overbeck (born 16 June 1983) is a former German male canoeist who won medals at senior level the Wildwater Canoeing World Championships.
