= Claudia Brokof =

German canoeist

Personal information
- Nationality: German
- Born: 20 May 1977 (age 49) Kempton Park, South Africa
- Height: 1.73 m (5 ft 8 in)
- Weight: 69 kg (152 lb)

Sport
- Sport: Canoeing
- Event: Wildwater canoeing
- Club: Kajak-Klub Rosenheim

Claudia Brokof (born 20 05 1977) is a former German female canoeist who won at senior level the Wildwater Canoeing World Championships in 1998 in Garmisch-Partenkirchen.

In 1996 she won the third place at senior level the Wildwater Canoeing World Champhionships in Landeck, Austria.

In 1999 she received the award of the silver bay leaf from federal minister of the interior Otto Schily.
