= Yann Claudepierre =

French canoeist

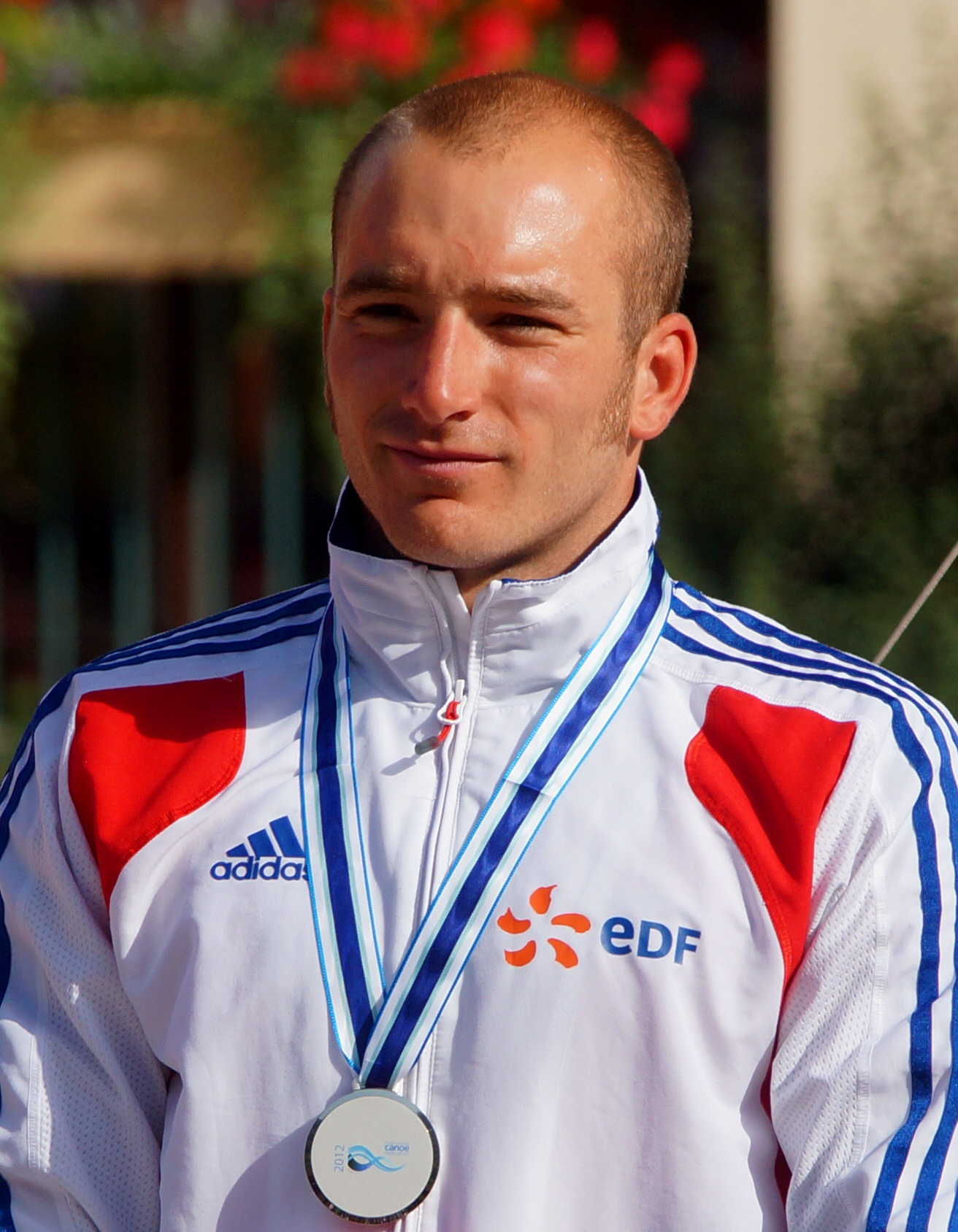

Personal information
- Nationality: French
- Born: 20 November 1984 (age 41) Colmar, France
- Height: 1.75 m (5 ft 9 in)
- Weight: 78 kg (172 lb)

Sport
- Sport: Canoeing
- Event: Wildwater canoeing
Medal record
Event	1st	2nd	3rd
World Championships	9	5	2
European Championships	7	1	3
Total	16	6	5

Yann Claudepierre (born 20 November 1984) is a French male canoeist who won 16 medals at senior level at the Wildwater Canoeing World Championships.
