= Cesare Mulazzi =

Italian canoeist

Personal information
- Nationality: Italian
- Born: 30 May 1965 (age 61) Lodi, Italy

Sport
- Sport: Canoeing
- Event: Wildwater canoeing

Cesare Mulazzi (born 30 May 1965) a former Italian male canoeist who won medals at senior level at the Wildwater Canoeing World Championships.

== Biography ==
After finishing his activity in the sport of canoeing, he became an athlete of senior sport.
