= Tomáš Slovák (canoeist) =

Czech canoeist

Personal information
- Nationality: Czech
- Born: 9 December 1979 (age 46) Opava, Czech Republic
- Height: 1.93 m (6 ft 4 in)

Sport
- Sport: Canoeing
- Event: Wildwater canoeing
- Club: SK UP Olomouc
- Coached by: Robert Knebel
Medal record
Event	1st	2nd	3rd
World Championships	5	3	6
European Championships	7	5	2
Total	12	8	8

Tomáš Slovák (born 9 December 1979) is a Czech male canoeist who won 14 medals at senior level at the Wildwater Canoeing World Championships.

== Medals at the World Championships ==
Senior

Year	1st place, gold medalist(s)	2nd place, silver medalist(s)	3rd place, bronze medalist(s)
2004	0	0	1
2006	1	0	2
2008	1	0	1
2010	2	0	1
2012	0	2	0
2013	1	0	0
2014	0	1	0
2015	0	0	1
