= Olaf Schwarz =

German canoeist

Personal information
- Nationality: German
- Born: 2 April 1969 (age 57) Germany

Sport
- Sport: Canoeing
- Event: Wildwater canoeing
- Club: VFW Oberalster
Medal record
Event	1st	2nd	3rd
World Championships	0	2	0

Olaf Schwarz (born 2 April 1969) is a former West German male canoeist who was twice silver medalist in Canadian C1 at senior level at the Wildwater Canoeing World Championships.
