= Jaroslav Slúčik =

Slovak wildwater canoeist

Personal information
- Nationality: Slovak
- Born: 27 April 1963 (age 63) Žilina, Czechoslovakia

Sport
- Sport: Canoe slalom, Wildwater canoeing
- Event: C1, C2
Medal record
Men's canoe slalom
Representing Czechoslovakia
World Championships
Bronze medal – third place	1987 Bourg St.-Maurice	C1 team
Men's wildwater canoeing
Representing Slovakia
World Championships
Gold medal – first place	1995 Bala	C2 classic
Gold medal – first place	1996 Landeck	C2 classic
Gold medal – first place	2000 Treignac	C2 classic
Gold medal – first place	2002 Valsesia	C2 classic
Gold medal – first place	2004 Garmisch-Partenkirchen	C2 classic
Gold medal – first place	2004 Garmisch-Partenkirchen	C2 sprint
Silver medal – second place	1993 Mezzana	C2 classic
Silver medal – second place	1998 Garmisch-Partenkirchen	C2 classic
Silver medal – second place	2010 Spain	C2 classic
Silver medal – second place	2002 Valsesia	C2 sprint

Jaroslav Slúčik is (born 27 April 1963 in Žilina) a former Czechoslovak-Slovak wildwater canoeist and slalom canoeist who competed in canoe slalom in the 1980s and in wildwater canoeing until 2013.

He is a five time world champion in the C2 classic discipline and one time world champion in C2 sprint at the Wildwater Canoeing World Championships where he competed together with Vladimír Vala.

He participated in two ICF Canoe Slalom World Championships, winning a bronze medal in the C1 team event at the 1987 World Championships in Bourg St.-Maurice.

== Career statistics ==
=== Canoe slalom ===
==== Major championships results timeline ====
Event		1985	1986	1987
World Championships	C1	25	Not held	27
World Championships	C1 team	—	Not held	3

== World Cup titles ==
Slúčik won seven editions of the Wildwater Canoeing World Cup in C2 classic.

Season	
Season	Discipline
1992	C2 classic
1995	C2 classic
1998	C2 classic
1999	C2 classic
2003	C2 classic
2004	C2 classic
2005	C2 classic
