= Michala Mrůzková =

Czech canoeist

Personal information
- Nationality: Czech
- Born: 19 October 1979 (age 46) Prague, Czech Republic
- Height: 1.62 m (5 ft 4 in)
- Weight: 56 kg (123 lb)

Sport
- Sport: Canoeing
- Events: Wildwater canoeing; Canoe sprint
- Retired: 2015
Medal record
Wildwater canoeing
Event	1st	2nd	3rd
World Championships	6	1	2
European Championships	5	0	4
Total	11	1	6
Canoe sprint
Event	1st	2nd	3rd
World Championships	0	1	1
European Championships	0	0	1
Total	0	1	2

Michala Mrůzková (nee Strnadová; born 19 October 1979) is a former Czech female canoeist who won several medals at senior level at the Wildwater Canoeing World Championships. She also has competed since the mid-2000s in canoe sprint, when she won two medals at the 2006 ICF Canoe Sprint World Championships in Szeged with a silver in the K-2 500 m and a bronze in the K-1 1000 m events.

== Biography ==
Mrůzková also competed in two Summer Olympics, earning her best finish of eighth in the K-2 500 m event at Beijing in 2008. Mrůzková and the other legend of the Czech canoe Kamil Mrůzek are sibling-in-law, being married to his brother.

== Achievements ==
Year	Competition	Venue	Rank	Event	Time
Wildwater canoeing
1998	World Championships	(Germany) Garmisch	3rd	K1 classic team	
2000	World Championships	(France) Treignac	1st	K1 classic	
2002	World Championships	(Italy) Valsesia	1st	K1 classic	
2002	World Championships	(Italy) Valsesia	3rd	K1 classic team	
2002	World Championships	(Italy) Valsesia	1st	K1 sprint	
2006	World Championships	(Czech Republic) Karlovy Vary	1st	K1 classic	
2006	World Championships	(Czech Republic) Karlovy Vary	1st	K1 classic team	
2006	World Championships	(Czech Republic) Karlovy Vary	1st	K1 sprint	
2014	World Championships	(Italy) Valtellina	2nd	K1 classic	
Canoe sprint
2006	World Championships	(Hungary) Szeged	2nd	K2 500 m	
2006	World Championships	(Hungary) Szeged	3rd	K1 1000 m	
