= Marco Previde Massara =

Italian canoeist

Personal information
- Nationality: Italian
- Born: 1958 (age 67–68) Vigevano, Italy

Sport
- Sport: Canoeing
- Event: Wildwater canoeing
Medal record
Event	1st	2nd	3rd
World Championships	4	2	1

Marco Previde Massara (born 1958) a former Italian male canoeist who won seven medals at senior level at the Wildwater Canoeing World Championships.

== Biography ==
After finishing his activity in the sport of canoeing, he became an athlete of masters cycling.
