= Melanie Mathys =

Swiss canoeist

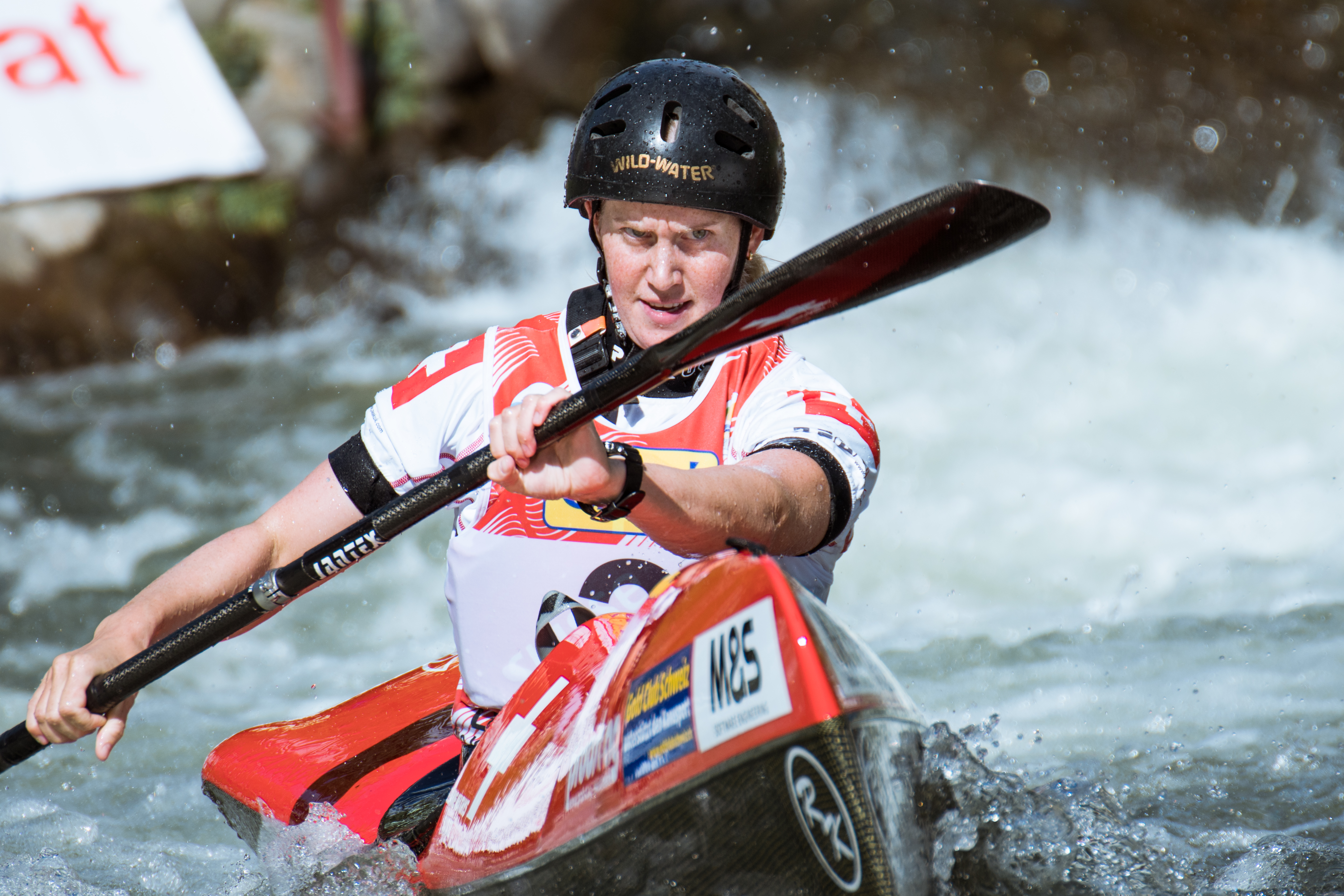
- Mathys in 2019.

Personal information
- Nationality: Swiss
- Born: 3 March 1994 (age 32) Solothurn, Switzerland

Sport
- Sport: Canoeing
- Event: Wildwater canoeing
- Club: Solothurner Kajakfahrer
Medal record
Event	1st	2nd	3rd
World Championships	0	1	5
European Championships	0	1	3
Total	0	2	8

Melanie Mathys (born 3 March 1994) is a Swiss female canoeist who won medals at senior level the Wildwater Canoeing World Championships.

== Biography ==
Mathys won three editions of the Wildwater Canoeing World Cup in K1 (2016, 2017, 2018).

== Achievements ==
Year	Competition	Venue	Rank	Event	Time
2011	European Championships	(Serbia) Kraljevo	3rd	K1 sprint team	2:30.46
2011	European Championships	(Serbia) Kraljevo	3rd	K1 classic team	17:43.89
2012	World Championships	(France) La Plagne	3rd	K1 sprint team	2:56.76
2012	World Championships	(France) La Plagne	3rd	K1 classic team	15:05.27
2013	European Championships	(Slovenia) Bovec	2nd	K1 sprint team	1:18.75
2013	World Championships	(Slovenia) Solkan	2nd	K1 sprint	68.95
2016	World Championships	(Bosnia and Herzegovina) Banja Luka	3rd	K1 sprint	59.14
2017	European Championships	(North Macedonia) Skopje	3rd	K1 sprint	45.20
2018	World Championships	(Switzerland) Muotathal	3rd	K1 classic	13:04.41
2018	World Championships	(Switzerland) Muotathal	3rd	K1 classic team	13:31.36
