= Marjolaine Hecquet =

French canoeist

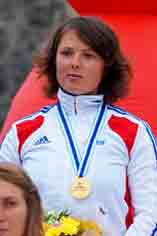

Personal information
- Nationality: French
- Born: 25 March 1993 (age 33) Bergerac, France

Sport
- Sport: Canoeing
- Events: Wildwater canoeing; Canoe sprint
Medal record
Wildwater canoeing
Event	1st	2nd	3rd
World Championships	3	1	0
European Championships	1	0	0
Total	4	1	0

Marjolaine Hecquet (born 25 March 1993) is a French female canoeist who won five medals at individual senior level at the Wildwater Canoeing World Championships and European Wildwater Championships.

== Biography ==
Hecquet practiced the canoe sprint up to the under-23 level and then moved definitively to the wildwater canoeing where she obtained the best results, including three world champion titles.
