= Carlo Mercati =

Italian canoeist

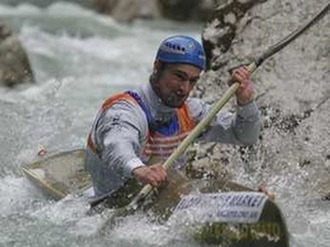

Personal information
- Nationality: Italian
- Born: 19 May 1976 (age 50) Città di Castello, Italy

Sport
- Sport: Canoeing
- Event: Wildwater canoeing
- Club: G.S. Marina Militare (1996-1997); G.S. Forestale (2001-2009)
- Retired: 2009
Medal record
Wildwater canoeing
World Championships
Gold medal – first place	2004 Garmisch-Partenkirchen	K1

Carlo Mercati (born 19 May 1976) is a former Italian male canoeist who was World champion at 2004 Garmisch-Partenkirchen.
