= Andrej Jelenc =

Slovenian canoeist

Andrej Jelenc (born 8 July 1963 in Ljubljana) is a former whitewater canoeist from Slovenia.

During his competitive career, Jelenc won one gold, one silver, and one bronze medal at World Championships in individual events. In team events, he won one gold, two silver and three bronze medals. For these achievements, Jelenc was named the Slovenian sportsman of the year in 1989.

Following the end of his sporting career, he continued to work as a coach for junior teams and then in the senior national team. For his work, he was awarded the Bloudek award, which is the highest sporting award in Slovenia. He was also accepted to Slovenian Athletes Hall of Fame in 2013.
