= Robert Pontarollo =

Italian canoeist

Personal information
- Nationality: Italian
- Born: 12 November 1971 (age 54) Bassano del Grappa, Italy
- Height: 1.79 m (5 ft 10 in)
- Weight: 72 kg (159 lb)

Sport
- Sport: Canoeing
- Event: Wildwater canoeing
- Retired: 2005
Medal record
Event	1st	2nd	3rd
World Championships	0	10	3

Robert Pontarollo (born 12 November 1971) a former Italian male canoeist who won thirteen medal at senior level at the Wildwater Canoeing World Championships.

== Biography ==
Pontarollo won five edition of Wildwater Canoeing World Cup (1994, 1995, 1996, 1998, 2002).

He was the technical director of the Italy national wildwater canoeing team, until 2017 when he was replaced by another Italian canoeing legend, Vladi Panato.
