= Helmar Steindl =

Austrian canoeist

Helmar Steindl (born 7 February 1945) is an Austrian retired slalom canoeist who competed from the late 1960s to the late 1970s. He finished eighth in the C-2 event at the 1972 Summer Olympics in Munich.
