= Bernd Heinemann =

German canoeist

Personal information
- Full name: Bernhard Heinemann
- Nationality: German
- Born: 8 September 1949 (age 76) Schrobenhausen, Germany
- Height: 1.90 m (6 ft 3 in)
- Weight: 81 kg (179 lb)

Sport
- Sport: Canoeing
- Event(s): Canoe slalom Wildwater canoeing
- Club: TSV Schwaben Augsburg
Medal record
Wildwater canoeing
Event	1st	2nd	3rd
World Championships	1	1	0

Bernhard "Bernd" Heinemann (born 19 June 1949) is a former West German male canoeist who was world champion in Canadian C1 at senior level at the Wildwater Canoeing World Championships.

== Biography ==
Heinemann participated at one edition of Olympic Games in canoe slalom in Munich 1972, where he was 16th it the C1 final.

== Achievements ==
Representing West Germany
Year	Competition	Venue	Rank	Event	Performance
1972	Olympic Games	(West Germany) Munich	16th	C1 slalom	467.41
