= Ulrich Hippauf =

East German canoeist

Medal record

Men's canoe slalom

Representing East Germany

World Championships
Gold medal – first place	1967 Lipno	C-2 team

Ulrich Hippauf is a former East German slalom canoeist who competed in the 1960s. He won a gold medal in the C-2 team event at the 1967 ICF Canoe Slalom World Championships in Lipno.
