= Nathalie Leclerc =

French canoeist

Personal information
- Nationality: French
- Born: 31 January 1980 (age 46) France

Sport
- Sport: Canoeing
- Event: Wildwater canoeing
Medal record
Individual
| Event | 1st | 2nd | 3rd |
|---|---|---|---|
| World Championships | 1 | 1 | 1 |
| European Championships | 2 | 3 | 1 |
| Total | 3 | 4 | 2 |

Nathalie Leclerc (born 31 January 1980) is a French female canoeist who won nine medals at individual senior level at the Wildwater Canoeing World Championships and European Wildwater Championships.
