= Rudolf Klepp =

Austrian slalom canoeist

Sport
- Sport: Kayaking
- Event: Folding kayak
Medal record
Men's canoe slalom
Representing Austria
World Championships
Silver medal – second place	1955 Tacen	Folding K-1 team

Rudolf Klepp is an Austrian retired slalom canoeist who competed from the mid-1950s to the early 1960s. He won a silver medal in the folding K-1 team event at the 1955 ICF Canoe Slalom World Championships in Tacen.
