= Hannah Müller =

Swiss canoeist

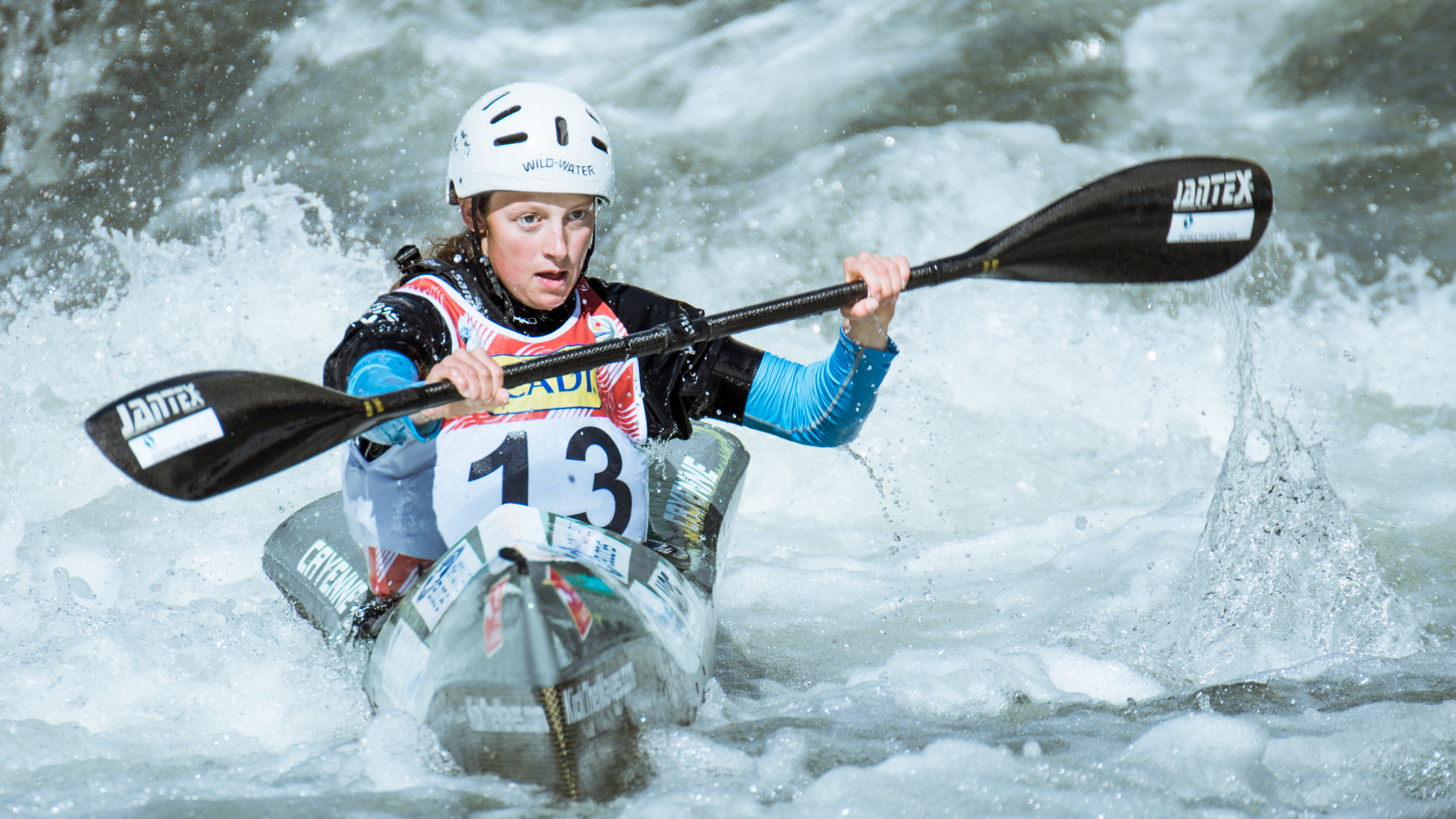

Personal information
- Born: 19 July 2000 (age 25)

Sport
- Sport: canoeing

Hannah Müller (born 19 July 2000) is a Swiss female canoeist who was finalist at senior level at the 2018 and 2019 Wildwater Canoeing World Championships.
