= Heimo Müllneritsch =

Austrian canoeist

Heimo Müllneritsch (born 17 November 1947) is an Austrian retired slalom canoeist who competed from the late 1960s to the late 1970s. He finished eighth in the C-2 event at the 1972 Summer Olympics in Munich.
