= Gilles Zok =

French canoeist

Personal information
- Nationality: French
- Born: 25 May 1954 (age 72) Vienne, Isère, France

Sport
- Sport: Canoeing
- Event: Wildwater canoeing
Medal record
Event	1st	2nd	3rd
World Championships	9	3	0
Total	9	3	0

Gilles Zok (born 25 May 1954) is a French male canoeist who won four world championships in C1 at individual senior level at the Wildwater Canoeing World Championships.
