= Sixtine Malaterre =

French canoeist (born 1987)

Personal information
- Nationality: French
- Born: 11 August 1987 (age 38) France
- Height: 1.67 m (5 ft 6 in)
- Weight: 59 kg (130 lb)

Sport
- Sport: Canoeing
- Event: Wildwater canoeing
- Club: Marseille Mazargues Canoë Kayak
Medal record
Wildwater canoeing
Event	1st	2nd	3rd
World Championships	4	4	3
European Championships	3	4	0
Total	7	8	3

Sixtine Malaterre (born 11 August 1987) is a French canoeist. She won several medals at senior level of the Wildwater Canoeing World Championships.
