= Kamil Mrůzek =

Czech canoeist

Personal information
- Nationality: Czech
- Born: 11 August 1977 (age 48) Czech Republic

Sport
- Sport: Canoeing
- Events: Canoe sprint; Wildwater canoeing; Canoe marathon
- Club: ASC Dukla
- Coached by: Oldřich Blažíček
Medal record
Wildwater canoeing
Event	1st	2nd	3rd
World Championships	7	3	2
European Championships	8	5	3
Total	15	8	5

Kamil Mrůzek (born 11 August 1977) is a Czech male canoeist who won several medals at senior level at the Wildwater Canoeing World Championships.

== Biography ==
Mrůzek won three editions of the Wildwater Canoeing World Cup in K1, and he won 28 medals at World and European championships.

Kamil Mrůzek and the other legend of the Czech canoe Michaela Strnadová-Mrůzková are siblings-in-law, in that she married his brother.

== Achievements ==
Year	World Championships			European Championships			World Cup
Year	1st place, gold medalist(s)	2nd place, silver medalist(s)	3rd place, bronze medalist(s)	1st place, gold medalist(s)	2nd place, silver medalist(s)	3rd place, bronze medalist(s)	
Year	Wildwater canoeing						
2000	1	0	0				
2002	1	0	1				
2003				2	0	0	
2004	1	0	0				
2005				1	1	0	
2006	2	0	0				
2007				2	1	0	
2008	1	0	0				
2009				0	1	0	
2010	1	0	0				
2011	0	0	0	1	1	1	
2012	0	1	0				
2013	0	0	0	1	1	0	
2014	0	2	1				
2015	0	0	0	0	0	1	
2017	0	0	0	0	0	1	
2019	0	0	0	1	0	0	
