= Jean-Luc Verger =

French canoeist

Luc
Personal information
- Nationality: French
- Born: 28 May 1952 (age 74) France

Sport
- Sport: Canoeing
- Event: Wildwater canoeing

Luc Verger (born 28 May 1952) is a French male canoeist who won two world championships in C1 at individual senior level at the Wildwater Canoeing World Championships.
