= Gundula Jander =

German canoeist

Personal information
- Nationality: German
- Born: East Germany

Sport
- Sport: Canoeing
- Event: Wildwater canoeing

Gundula Jander (born ?) is a German former canoeist who won at senior level the Wildwater Canoeing World Championships.
