= Dominique Gardette =

French canoeist

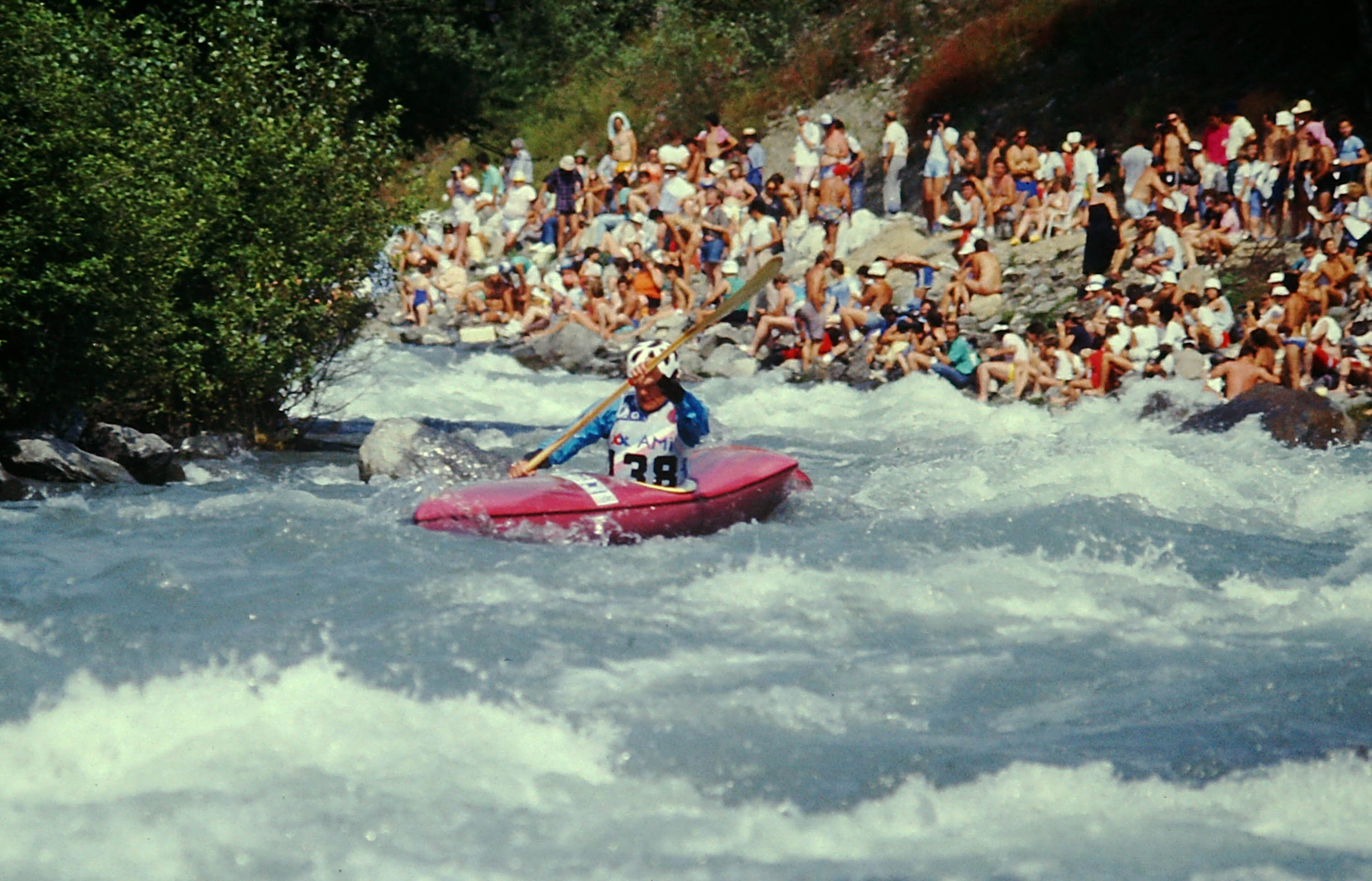
- Gardette in 1987

Personal information
- Nationality: French
- Born: 10 June 1954 (age 72) Privas, France

Sport
- Sport: Canoeing
- Event: Wildwater canoeing

Dominique Gardette (born 10 June 1954) is a former French female canoeist who won at senior level the Wildwater Canoeing World Championships.
