= Heinz Grobat =

Slalom canoeist

Medal record

Men's canoe slalom

Representing Switzerland

World Championships
Bronze medal – third place	1963 Spittal	C-1 team

Heinz Grobat is a Swiss retired slalom canoeist who competed from the early 1960s to the early 1970s. He won a bronze medal in the C-1 team event at the 1963 ICF Canoe Slalom World Championships in Spittal.
