= Emil Milihram =

Croatian canoeist

Personal information
- Nationality: Croatian
- Born: 21 October 1982 (age 43) Varaždin, Croatia

Sport
- Sport: Canoeing
- Event: Wildwater canoeing
Medal record
Event	1st	2nd	3rd
World Championships	5	3	2

Emil Milihram (born 21 October 1982) is a Croatian male canoeist who won a world championship at senior level at the Wildwater Canoeing World Championships and twice the Wildwater Canoeing World Cup.
