= Ursula Profanter =

Austrian canoeist (born 1968)

Personal information
- Nationality: Austrian
- Born: 22 March 1968 (age 58) Graz, Austria

Sport
- Sport: Canoeing
- Events: [èCanoe sprint] Wildwater canoeing
Medal record
Women's Canoe sprint
World Championships
Bronze medal – third place	1997 Dartmouth	K-1 500 m
Bronze medal – third place	1997 Dartmouth	K-1 1000 m
Wildwater canoeing
Event	1st	2nd	3rd
World Championships	3	3	3
European Championships	0	1	0
Total	3	4	3

Ursula "Uschi" Profanter (Graz, March 22, 1968) is an Austrian sprint canoer and marathon canoeist who competed from the early 1990s to the early 2000s (decade). She won two bronze medals at the 1997 ICF Canoe Sprint World Championships in Dartmouth, earning them in the K-1 500 m and K-1 1000 m events.

Profanter also competed in three Summer Olympics, earning her best finish of fifth in the K-1 500 m event at Barcelona in 1992.
