= Thomas Koelmann =

German canoeist

Personal information
- Nationality: German
- Born: 19 July 1968 (age 57) Germany

Sport
- Sport: Canoeing
- Event: Wildwater canoeing

Thomas Koelmann (born 19 July 1968) is a former German male canoeist who won medals at senior level the Wildwater Canoeing World Championships.
