= Willi Landers =

German slalom canoeist

Medal record

Men's canoe slalom

Representing East Germany

World Championships
Gold medal – first place	1967 Lipno	C-2 team
Silver medal – second place	1961 Hainsberg	Mixed C-2

Willi Landers (born *1939) is a slalom canoeist who competed for East Germany in the 1960s. He won two medals at the ICF Canoe Slalom World Championships with a gold (C-2 team: 1967) and a silver (Mixed C-2: 1961). He was born in Bützow.
