= Lukáš Novosad =

Czech canoeist

Personal information
- Nationality: Czech
- Born: 22 November 1976 (age 49) Czech Republic

Sport
- Sport: Canoeing
- Event: Wildwater canoeing
Medal record
Event	1st	2nd	3rd
World Championships	1	2	3
European Championships	1	1	2
Total	2	3	5

Lukáš Novosad (born 22 Novemmer 1976) is a Czech male canoeist who won ten medals at individual senior level at the Wildwater Canoeing World Championships and European Wildwater Championships.
