= Gisela Grothaus =

German canoeist

Personal information
- Nationality: German
- Born: 20 February 1955 (age 71) Berlin, Germany
- Height: 1.64 m (5 ft 5 in)
- Weight: 58 kg (128 lb)

Sport
- Sport: Canoeing
- Events: Canoe slalom; Wildwater canoeing
- Club: TSV Schwaben Augsburg
Medal record
Representing West Germany
Canoe slalom
Event / 1st / 2nd / 3rd; Olympic Games / 0 / 1 / 0
Olympic Games
Silver medal – second place	1972 Munich	K-1
Wildwater canoeing
Event / 1st / 2nd / 3rd; World Championships / 3 / 3 / 0

Gisela Grothaus (married Steigerwald; born 20 February 1955) is a West German retired slalom canoeist who competed in the early and mid-1970s. She won a silver medal in the K-1 event at the 1972 Summer Olympics in Munich.

She won also three world championships in wildwater canoeing at senior level at the Wildwater Canoeing World Championships.

== The question about surname ==
Gisela Grothaus was married during the fall of 1984 and her new name became Steigerwald, therefore she should have assumed her new name "Gisela Steigerwald" in international competitions since 1984, however in the databases of the International Canoe Federation and the European Canoe Association, she is indicated by the name "Gisela Steigerwald" even before this year.
