= Bärbel Körner =

West German slalom canoeist

Medal record

Women's canoe slalom

Representing West Germany

World Championships
Gold medal – first place	1969 Bourg St.-Maurice	K-1 team
Silver medal – second place	1971 Meran	K-1 team
Bronze medal – third place	1965 Spittal	K-1
Bronze medal – third place	1965 Spittal	K-1 team
Bronze medal – third place	1967 Lipno	K-1 team

Bärbel Körner is a West German retired slalom canoeist who competed in the 1960s and the 1970s.

She won five medals at the ICF Canoe Slalom World Championships with a gold (K-1 team: 1969), a silver (K-1 team: 1971) and three bronzes (K-1: 1965; K-1 team: 1965, 1967).
