= Michel Magdinier =

Medal record

Men's canoe slalom

Representing France

World Championships
Bronze medal – third place	1973 Muotathal	K-1 team

Michel Magdinier is a former French slalom canoeist who competed from the late 1960s to the mid-1970s. He won a bronze medal in the K-1 team event at the 1973 ICF Canoe Slalom World Championships in Muotathal.
