= Jiří Vočka =

Medal record

Men's canoe slalom

Representing Czechoslovakia

World Championships
Gold medal – first place	1965 Spittal	C-1 team

Jiří Vočka (born 14 November 1941) is a Czech former slalom canoeist who competed for Czechoslovakia in the 1960s and 1970s. He won a gold medal in the C-1 team event at the 1965 ICF Canoe Slalom World Championships in Spittal.
