= Ernst Libuda =

Medal record

Men's canoe slalom

Representing West Germany

World Championships
Silver medal – second place	1977 Spittal	C-1 team

Ernst Libuda is a former West German slalom canoeist who competed in the 1970s. He won a silver medal in the C-1 team event at the 1977 ICF Canoe Slalom World Championships in Spittal.
