= Zdeněk Fifka =

Medal record

Men's canoe slalom

Representing Czechoslovakia

World Championships
Silver medal – second place	1965 Spittal an der Drau	C-2

Zdeněk Fifka (born 3 November 1942) is a Czech retired slalom canoeist who competed for Czechoslovakia in the mid-to-late 1960s. He won a silver medal in the C-2 event at the 1965 ICF Canoe Slalom World Championships in Spittal an der Drau.
