= Ulrike Deppe =

West German slalom canoeist (born 1953)

Medal record

Women's canoe slalom

Representing West Germany

World Championships
Gold medal – first place	1969 Bourg St.-Maurice	K1 team
Gold medal – first place	1981 Bala	K1
Gold medal – first place	1981 Bala	K1 team
Silver medal – second place	1969 Bourg St.-Maurice	K1
Silver medal – second place	1971 Meran	K1 team
Silver medal – second place	1975 Skopje	K1
Silver medal – second place	1979 Jonquière	K1 team

Ulrike Deppe (9 December 1953 in Lippstadt) is a former West German slalom canoeist who competed at the international level from 1969 to 1983.

She won three medals in the K1 event at the ICF Canoe Slalom World Championships with a gold (1981) and two silvers (1969, 1975). She also won two golds (1969, 1981) and two silvers (1971, 1979) in the K1 team event at the World Championships.

Deppe finished seventh in the K1 event at the 1972 Summer Olympics in Munich.
