= Villa Mosconi Bertani =

Coordinates: 45°30′12.81″N 10°56′47.20″E

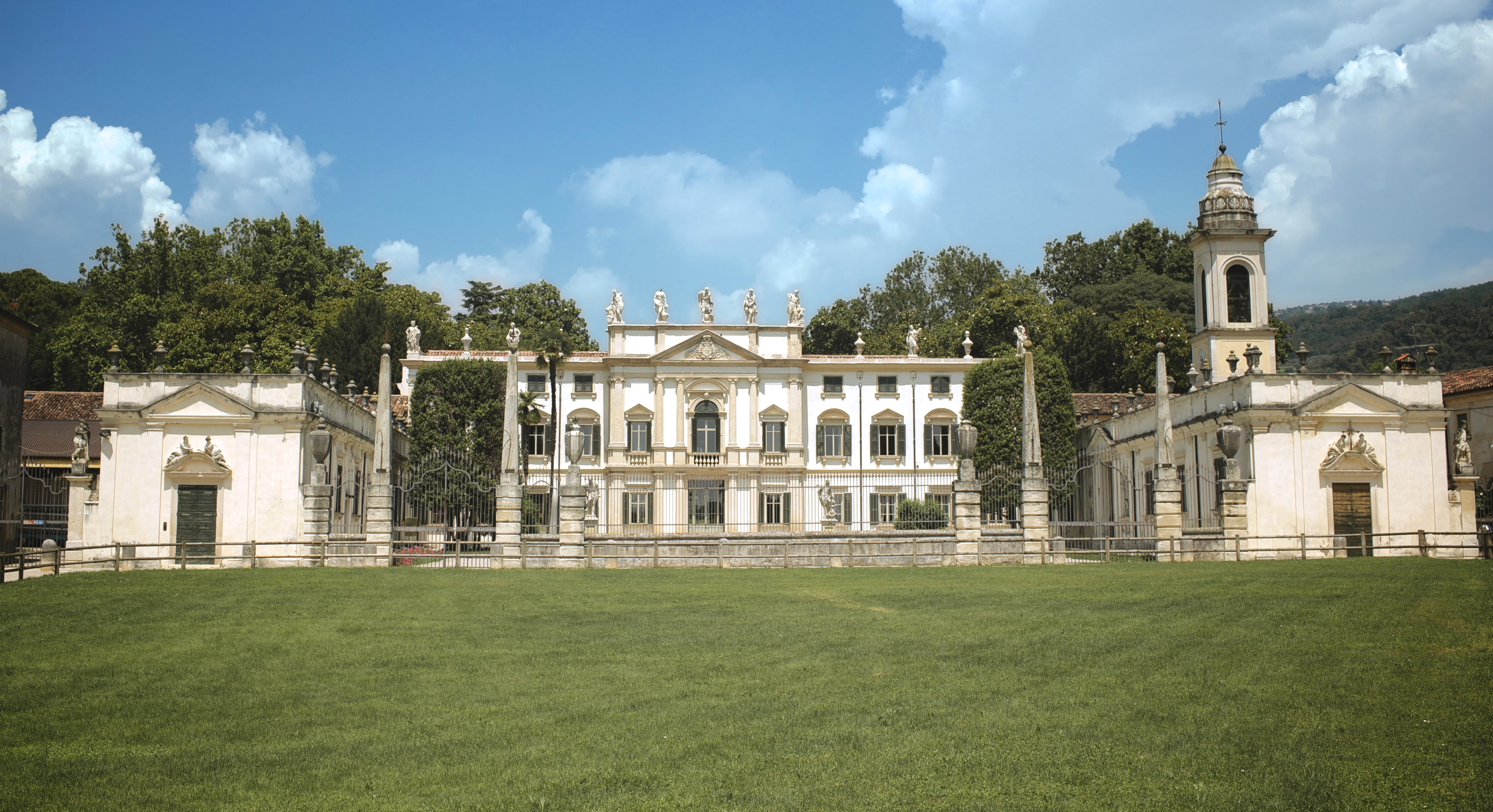

General information
- Type: Manor and Winery
- Architectural style: Neoclassical Palladian
- Location: Località Novare, Arbizzano di Negrar, Verona, Italy
- Construction started: ~1500
- Completed: 1735
- Owner: Tenuta Santa Maria - Bertani Family

Design and construction
- Architect: Adriano Cristofali

The Villa Mosconi Bertani (also known as Villa Novare) is a Neoclassical winery and manor in the Veneto region of Italy famous for its heritage in the production of Amarone della Valpolicella wine. It is located in the municipality of Negrar di Valpolicella, Località Novare, in the province of Verona. Today is owned by Bianca, Giovanni and Guglielmo Bertani and is home Tenuta Santa Maria di Gaetano Bertani winery. It is the only Veronese estate since the beginning of the 18th century specifically constructed for the purpose of wine production. It consists of a residence, large cellar and orchard (22 hectares (54 acres)).

Villa Mosconi Bertani is also known to have been an important centre of Romanticism, through Italian poet and writer Ippolito Pindemonte, and also the cradle of Amarone wine. The complex is listed and protected as a historical landmark by the Ministry of Cultural Heritage and Activities. The villa, park and winery are open to the public for guided tours, cultural events and private parties. The villa now is the main winery for Tenuta Santa Maria, owned by the Bertani family.

== History ==
Construction of the villa began around 1735 under the Fattori family, on the same wing as an existing 16th-century wine cellar and on the original site of an ancient Arusnate settlement which later became a settlement during the Roman Era. It was then sold, unfinished, to Mosconi in 1769, who completed the estate by adding an 8-hectare (20-acre) Romantic English-style garden. He also expanded the wine business. During the Mosconi period, the villa became an important intellectual and literary salon, frequented by cultural figures, including the poet Ippolito Pindemonte.

By the first half of the 20th century, the villa had suffered years of neglect and vandalism. Parts of the garden and some of its rooms fell into complete disrepair. In 1953, it was bought and restored by the Bertani family to house the headquarters of their eponymous winery.

== Architecture ==
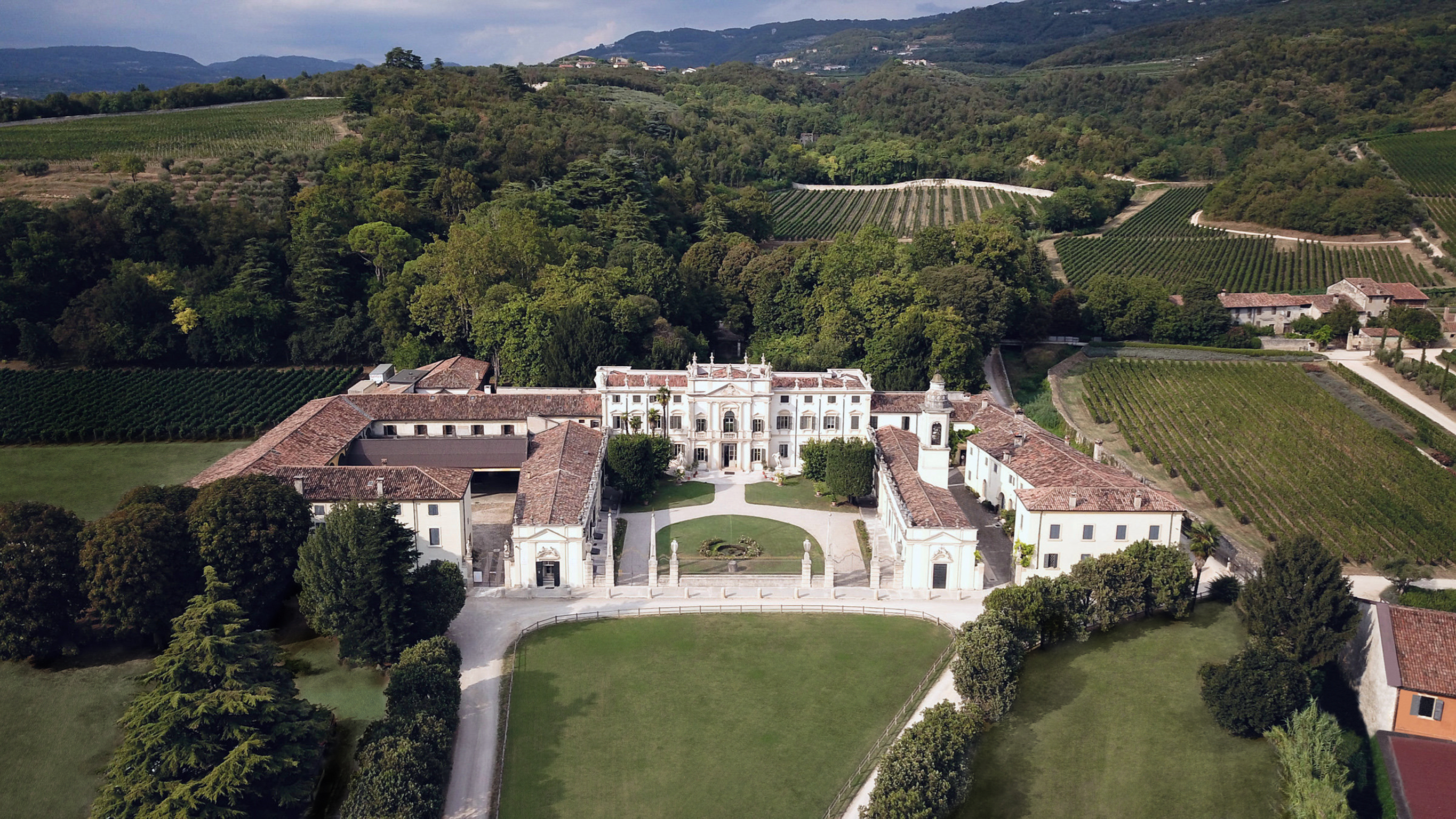
Villa Mosconi Bertani with the Amarone della Valpolicella Classico vineyards

The complex consists of a main building with two lower advancing wings, ending in two symmetrical facades. The bell tower of the chapel, dedicated to St. Gaetano, is built on the east wing. Gates on both wings grant access to the laborers' housing and the cellars.

Commissioned by the first owner of the estate, Giacomo Fattori, the construction of the entire complex —consisting of the central structure of the villa, the chapel and cellars— was originally designed by the architect Lodovico Perini and completed in the first half of the 18th century by the Veronese Adriano Cristofali. Fattori ordered the construction to replace an existing 16th-century residence.

The improvements made by the Fattori family were designed to give the home a self-congratulatory aristocratic air, since Fattori had recently been awarded the title of count. Cristofoli skillfully pursued a neoclassical style, re-envisioning of the two perpendicular wings. With this layout, he created a front garden area and cleverly concealed the view of the workers' quarters – hardly aristocratic – as well as separated the areas dedicated to leisure and folly from those strictly for agricultural use.

The main building is three stories consisting of a central pavilion marked by a double row of columns, Tuscan order on the ground floor and Ionic on the upper level, a pediment containing the coat of arms (later added by Trezza), and topped with five statues of mythical Greek gods. The statues in the garden are attributed to the sculptor Lorenzo Muttoni.

== Frescoes and painting ==
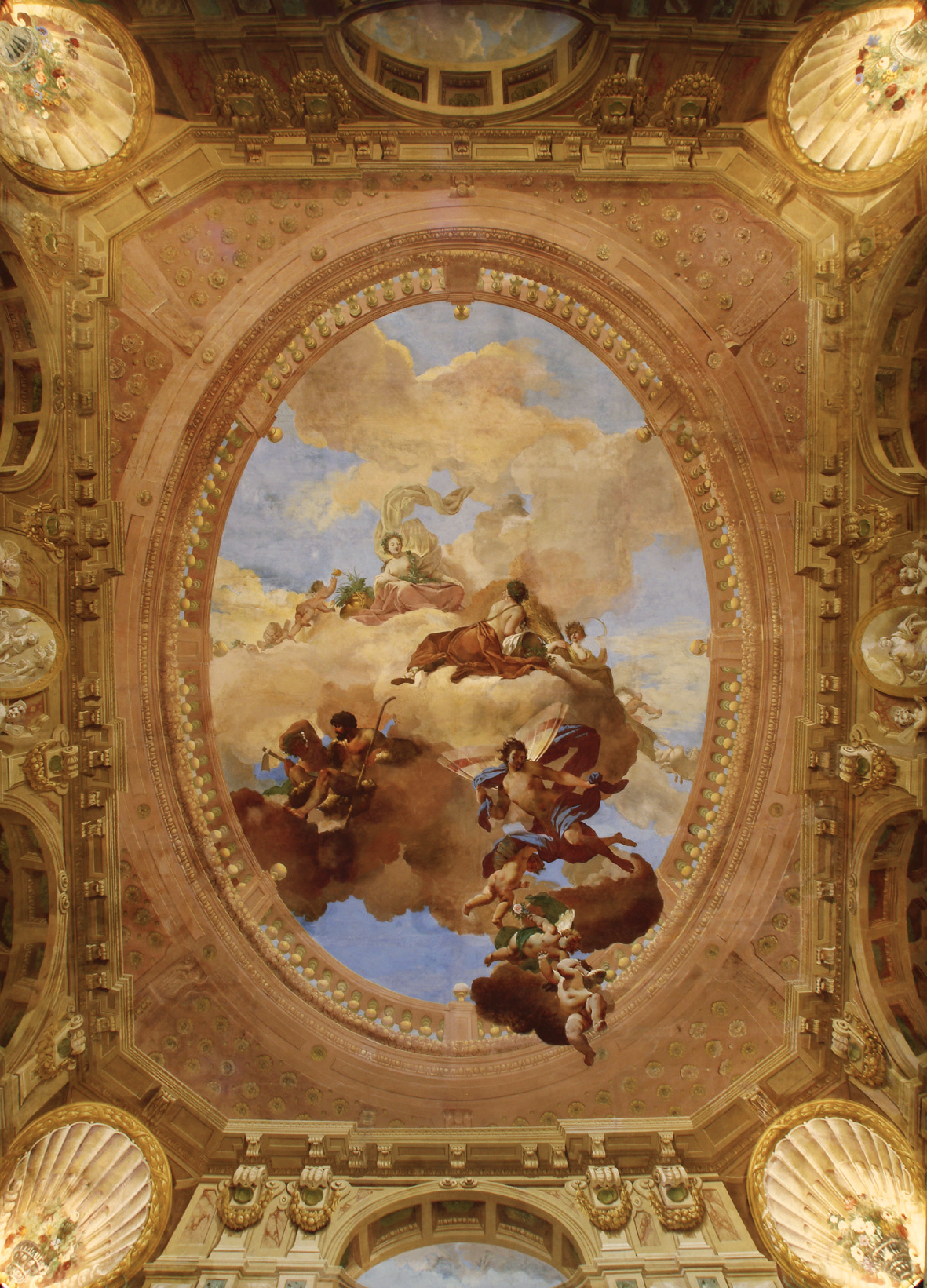
Salone Delle Muse frescos

The Chamber of the Muses, also dedicated to small performances of opera buffa and later opera seria, where the two Mosconi coat-of-arms can be seen, is a three-story central hall, surrounded by a painted wooden balustrade which cuts the room into two stacked horizontal bands:

- The bottom band is dominated by a faux ashlar (square-cut stone block) base, with niches containing paintings of statues representing the Muses of the arts: Architecture, Sculpture, Painting, Geometry, Astronomy and Music;
- The top band contains architectural trompe-l'œil, which gives a sense of perspective to the whole. The lateral monochrome paintings are of statues representing Abundance and Justice. The satyrs above the doors evoke the four seasons.

The four seasons and the passage of time – a clear reference to the agricultural setting and purpose of the estate – are the main themes of the ceiling fresco. In the center, sitting amongst colorful flowers, is the goddess Flora. To her bottom left perch Spring and Summer, painted in warm, bright colors. On the opposite side, in clear contrast, in dark storm clouds, are Fall and Winter. Hovering over all in the foreground is Favonius, god of the favorable west wind, accompanied by playful angels, and in the background, one can just discern Apollo in his chariot. The frescoes were painted by Emilian artists. For example, the decorative cycle of the two horizontal bands is attributed to trompe-l'œil painter Prospero Pesce, from the school of Filippo Maccari. The central ceiling fresco is attributed to Giuseppe Valliani, known as The Pistoian.

== Garden and surrounding parkland ==
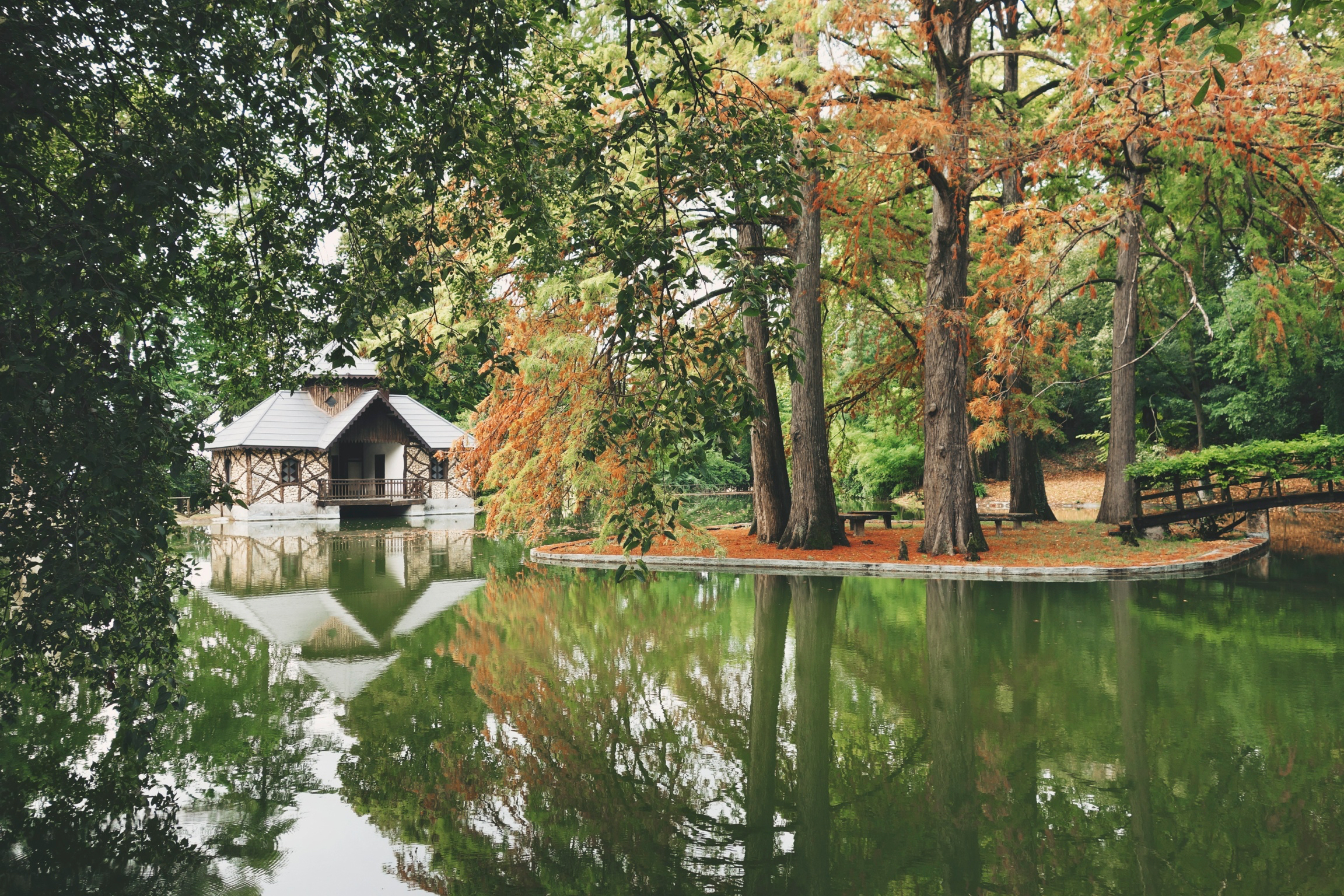
Romantic English-style park at Villa Mosconi Bertani

By the end of the 18th century, Romanticism, the fashion of the time, had spread to Verona. English-style gardens began to appear – rolling landscapes, exotic plants, meandering paths, hidden corners with faux archaeological ruins – instead of the Italian style, which was predominantly green and ordered. Following this trend, the brothers Giacomo and Guglielmo Mosconi reshaped the land behind the house, giving it two prominent features, a garden and a small wooded area. They built the pond, fed by springs located on the property with an island in the center, accessed by a wooden bridge. The island was planted with tall Taxodium trees, conifers in the cypress family. The brothers also constructed a coffeehouse inspired by similar Northern European buildings on the edge of the pond, facing the island.

The design of the park was suggested by poet Ippolito Pindemonte,

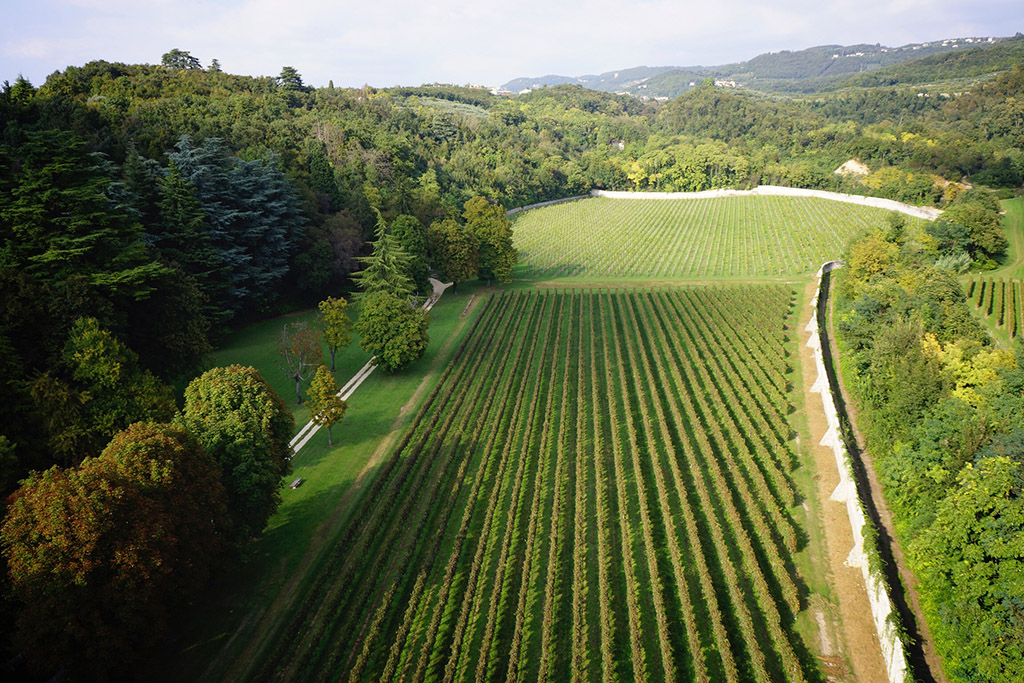
The 1500s twenty-two-hectare Clos – Amarone Classico Vineyards

who had been impressed by springs and fields he had seen while vacationing in France with close friend and host Jean-Jacques Rousseau. In the afternoon it served as a reading area, perhaps for visitors returning from a walk. In the evening, it lent itself to parlor games such as chess, the air filled with the lilting strains of a harp, played by the daughters of the Countess. The villa's icehouse, also located in the garden, was built in the late 18th century and used until the first half of the last century.

The original statues, chairs and a small, murmuring fountain still stand within the garden. The ample walled space, located directly behind the villa, encloses the grounds as well as an extensive Guyot vineyard, giving the entire landscape the feel of a country garden. On the front side of the elegant villa, a gate marked by bossage pillars with gables and decorative vases encloses the courtyard and an anterior garden. Its symmetrical shape is centered on a large, circular flowerbed, used for ornamental purposes and also to indicate the correct direction for incoming and outgoing carriages to the villa. The villa is listed on the Grandi Giardini Italiani registry.

== Villa and Ippolito Pindemonte ==
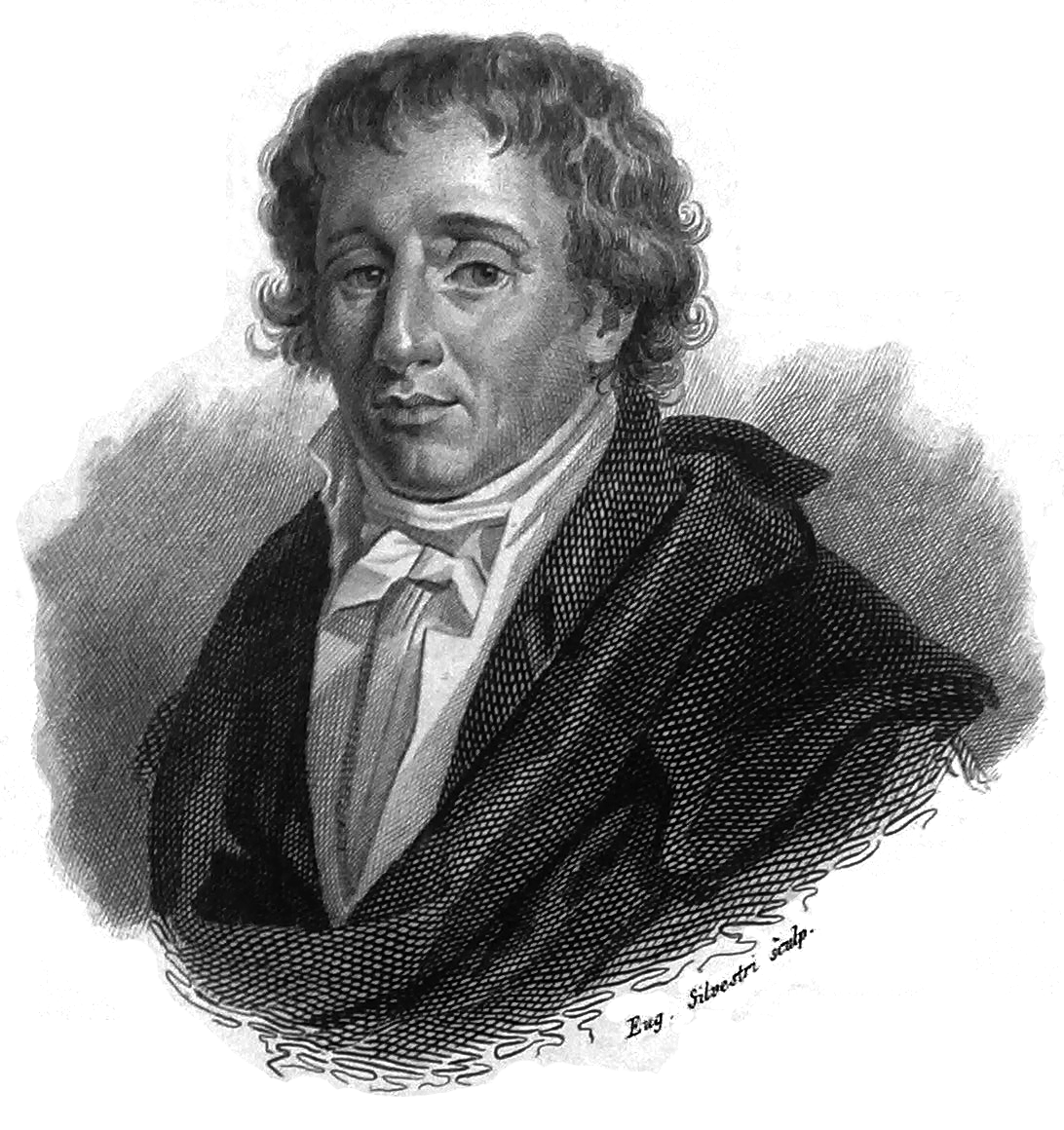
The playwright and prominent intellectual Ippolito Pindemonte

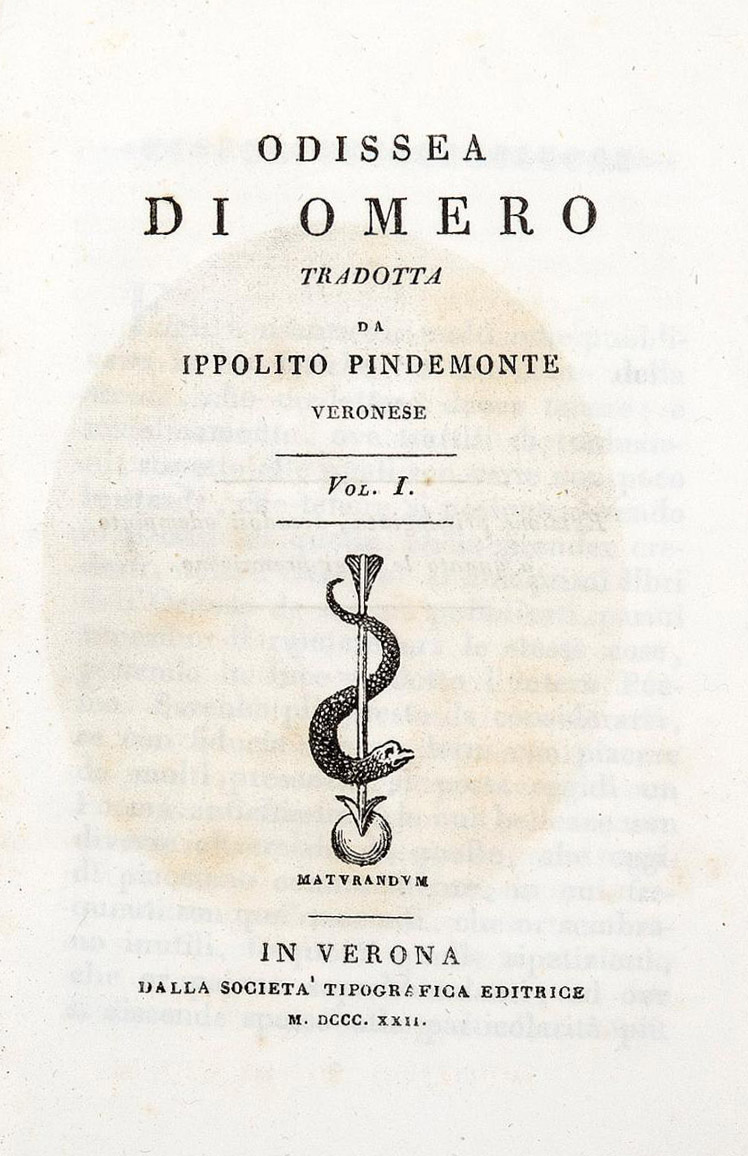
Homer's Odyssey – translation by Ippolito Pindemonte

The playwright and prominent intellectual figure Ippolito Pindemonte lived at the villa for ten years as the guest of Countess Elisabetta Mosconi. In one of his "Epistles in verse," written in 1800, he expressed his high regard for the Countess and villa thusly: "In your pleasant Novare I lived with you, kind Elisa, happy days;" A pleasant place to vacation indeed, by virtue in part of the lovely garden which Pindemonte mentions in this verse: "I saw the shadows of your garden, which seemed to me the most beautiful.” He added with unconcealed admiration for the wine: "But I look with even more yearning to these great noble barrels, whose oak senses and readily awaits the harvest."

Pindemonte was born into an aristocratic family, and travelled a great deal in his youth. He was a good friend of Giuseppe Torelli and the scholar Girolamo Pompei. His brother Giovanni Pindemonte was a prominent dramatist. He witnessed and was deeply affected by the French Revolution, residing in Paris for ten months during 1789. He later spent time in England and Austria. A Romantic poet, he was principally influenced by Ugo Foscolo and Thomas Gray, and was associated with the Della Cruscans. He devoted much of his life to a translation of the Odyssey, which was published in 1822.

== Vine-growing and winery ==
The villa is situated in Valpolicella, a viticultural center of the province of Verona and a zone producing Amarone Classico DOCG and Valpolicella Classico DOC. The large winery at the Villa Mosconi is one of the oldest continuously operating wine businesses in Italy.

The first maps of the winery and Brolo walled vineyard similar to the Burgundy Clos are dated around the 16th century.

Wine production underwent a major expansion during the Mosconi tenure at the end of the 17th century and later in the 19th century, when the Trezza family increased production even further. It was one of the largest Italian wineries of its day, as documented in a book of photography by M. Lotze. It is the only surviving document in Verona containing a record of the advanced Guyot cultivation methods (in the walled "Brolo" area),

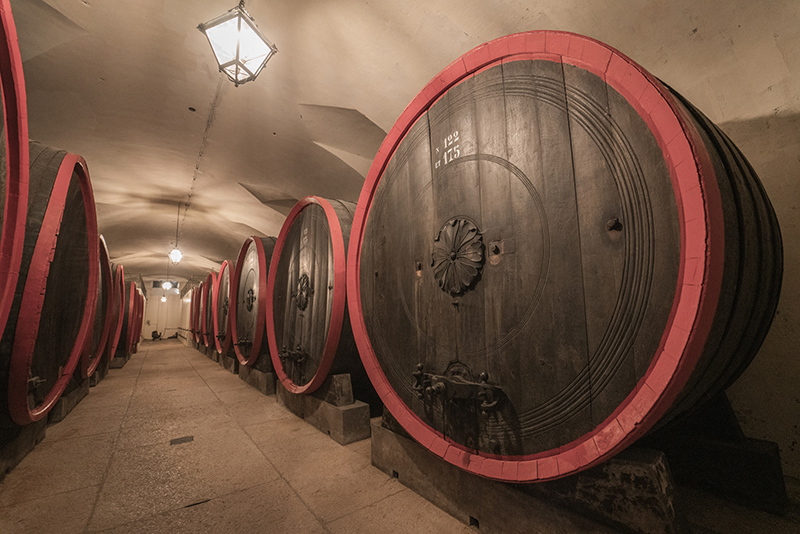
Early 1800s barrels in the estate. Photo by Tenuta Santa Maria di Gaetano Bertani

the wine making equipment and 18th-century wine barrels (for the most part still preserved in the winery museum), and the ample acreage reserved for viticulture today making up a part of the Villa Mosconi Bertani Estate at that time named Cantine Trezza. It was commissioned by the Province of Verona in the 1880s to document what was at the time a model cellar in the area. It is now housed in the Academy of Agriculture, Science and Letters of Verona.

The name Amarone, referring to the typical wine of Valpolicella, was coined at the estate in 1936, during the period it was leased to the Cantina Sociale Valpolicella.

From 1953 to 2012, the winery was further developed as the home and headquarters of the Cav. G. B. Bertani family. Since mid-2012, it is the exclusive property of Gaetano Bertani and his sons – Agricola Gaetano Bertani e Figli – who continue the family tradition of winemaking.
