= Adriano Cristofali =

Italian architect (1717–1788)

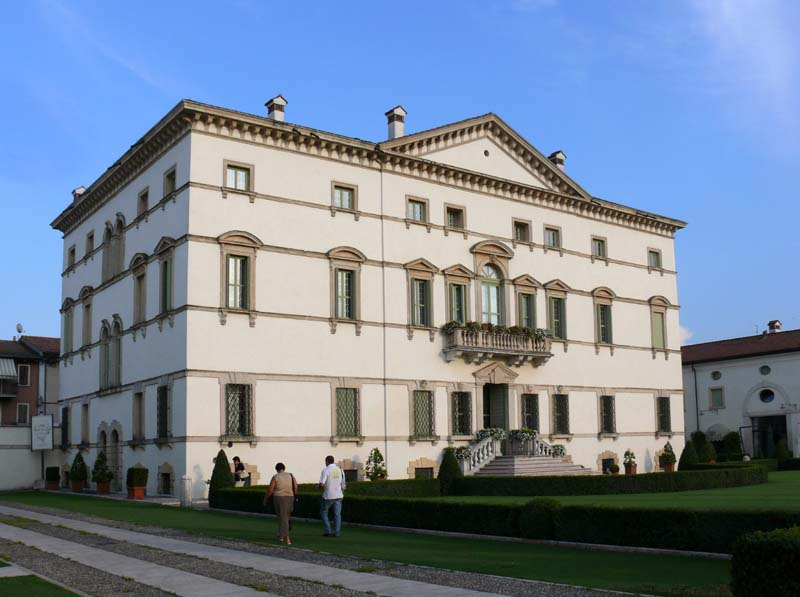
- Villa Vecelli Cavriani, Mozzecane, Verona
- Born: 25 March 1717; Verona, Republic of Venice
- Died: January 28, 1788 (aged 70); Verona, Republic of Venice
- Education: Alessandro Pompei
- Known for: Architecture
- Notable work: Villa Mosconi Bertani; Villa Bettoni
- Movement: Neoclassicism

Adriano Cristofali (25 March 1717 – 28 January 1788) was an architect from the Republic of Venice, whose style bridged between Enlightenment-Baroque architecture and Neoclassicism.

== Life ==
The son of a gardener to Marchese Giambattista Spolverini, Cristofali studied under Count Alessandro Pompei, an architectural theorist and learned his trade in the humanistic atmosphere fostered by Marchese Scipione Maffei. Despite his humble parentage, he worked as an architect, assessor, surveyor and hydraulic engineer, and trained a whole generation of younger architects in his studio, including two of his sons and Luigi Trezza.

His works in Verona include the Palazzo Sambonifacio Tedeschi (built 1750, now the Hotel Accademia), the Palazzo Balladoro (in front of palazzo Canossa) and the Palazzo Salvi (Headquarters of the Accademia di Agricoltura Scienze e Lettere), as well as the portico for the Teatro Filarmonico of Verona, completed by Ettore Fagiuoli in the following century. Also notable are his plans for the Villa Bettoni at Gargnano on the shores of Lake Garda; for the Villa Mosconi Bertani; for the Villa Bertani at Novare di Arbizzano; for the Villa Canossa at Grezzano; and for the Villa Vecelli Cavriani di Mozzecane.

== Gallery ==
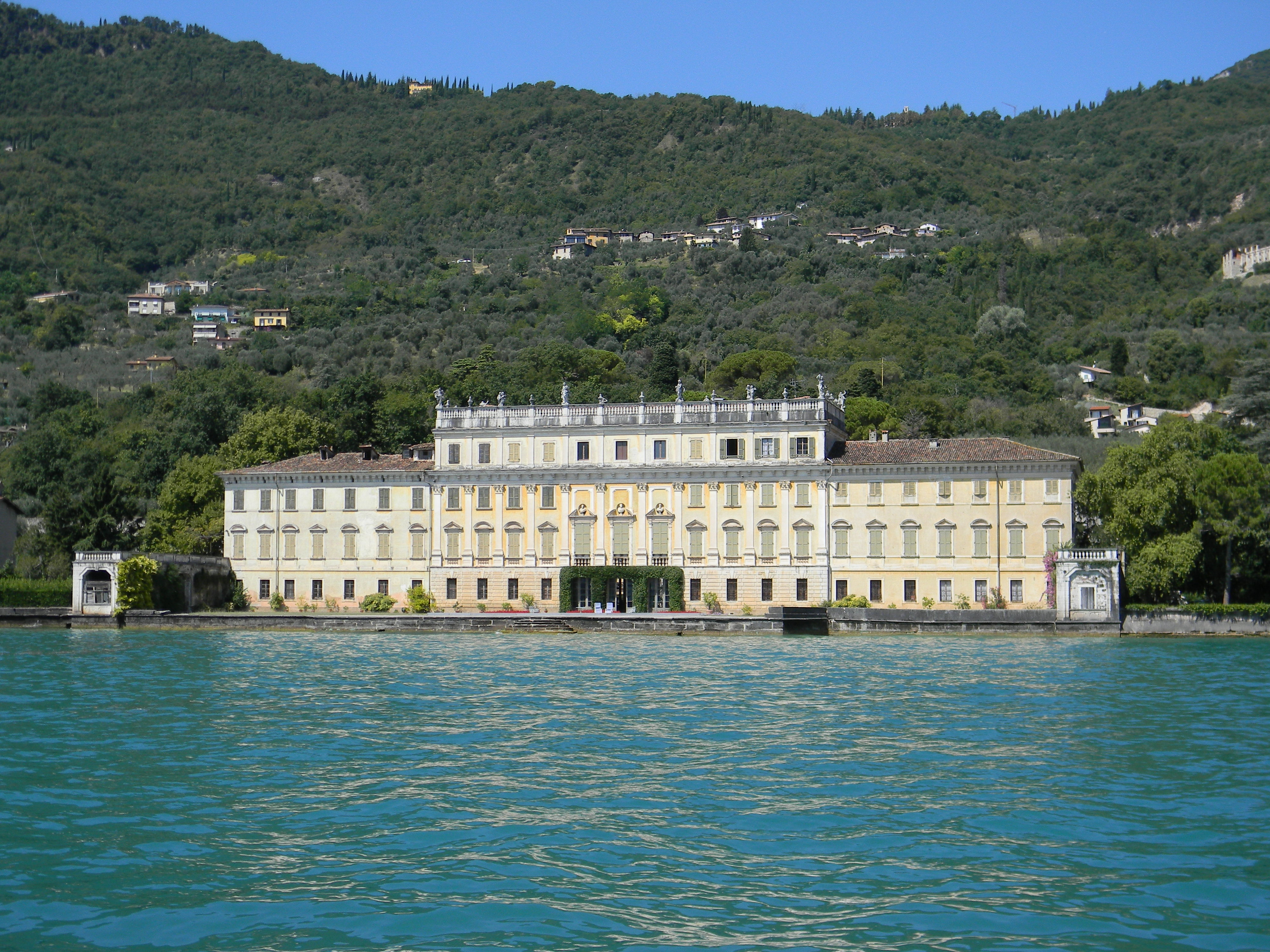
Villa Bettoni

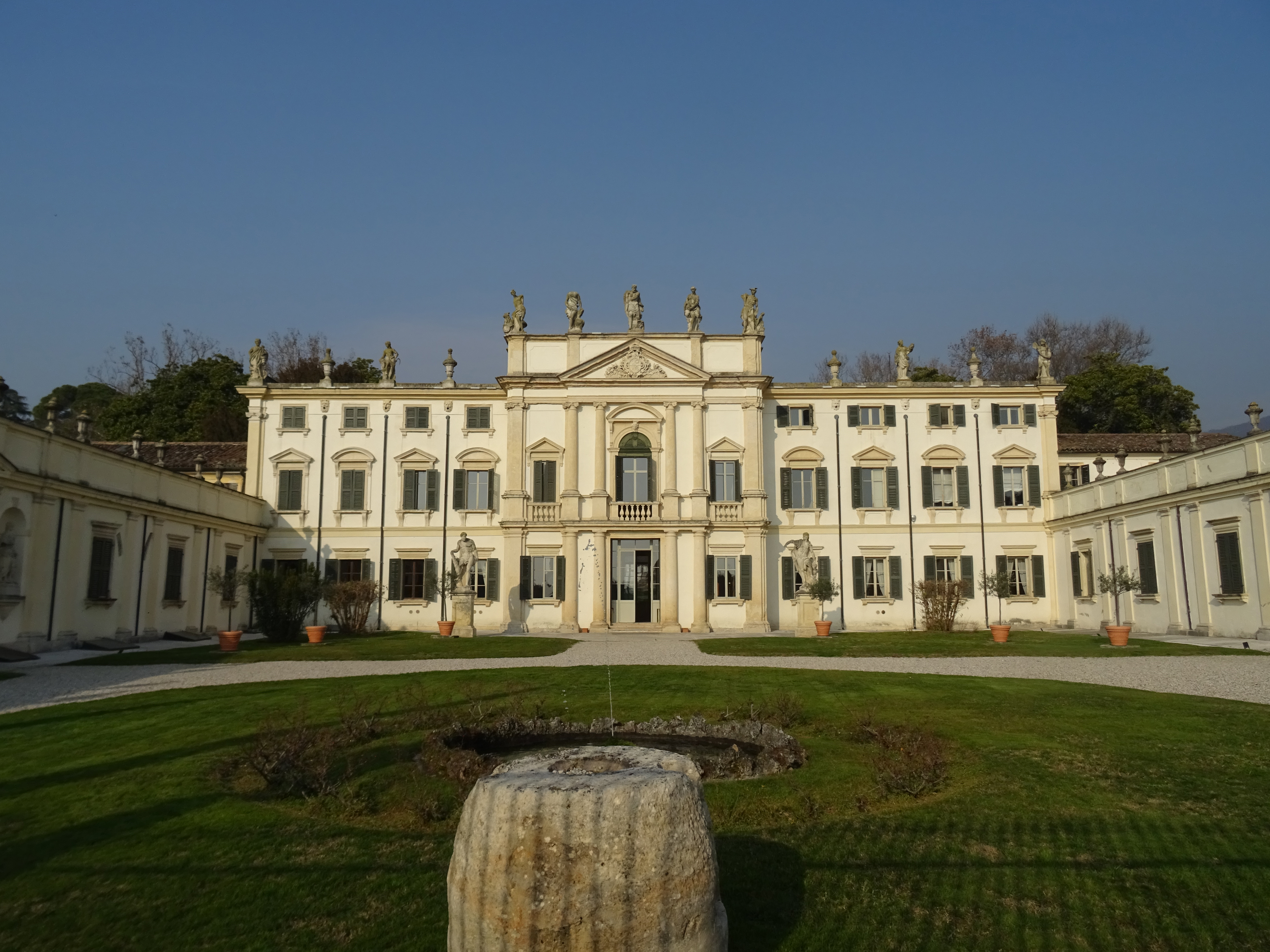
Villa Mosconi Bertani

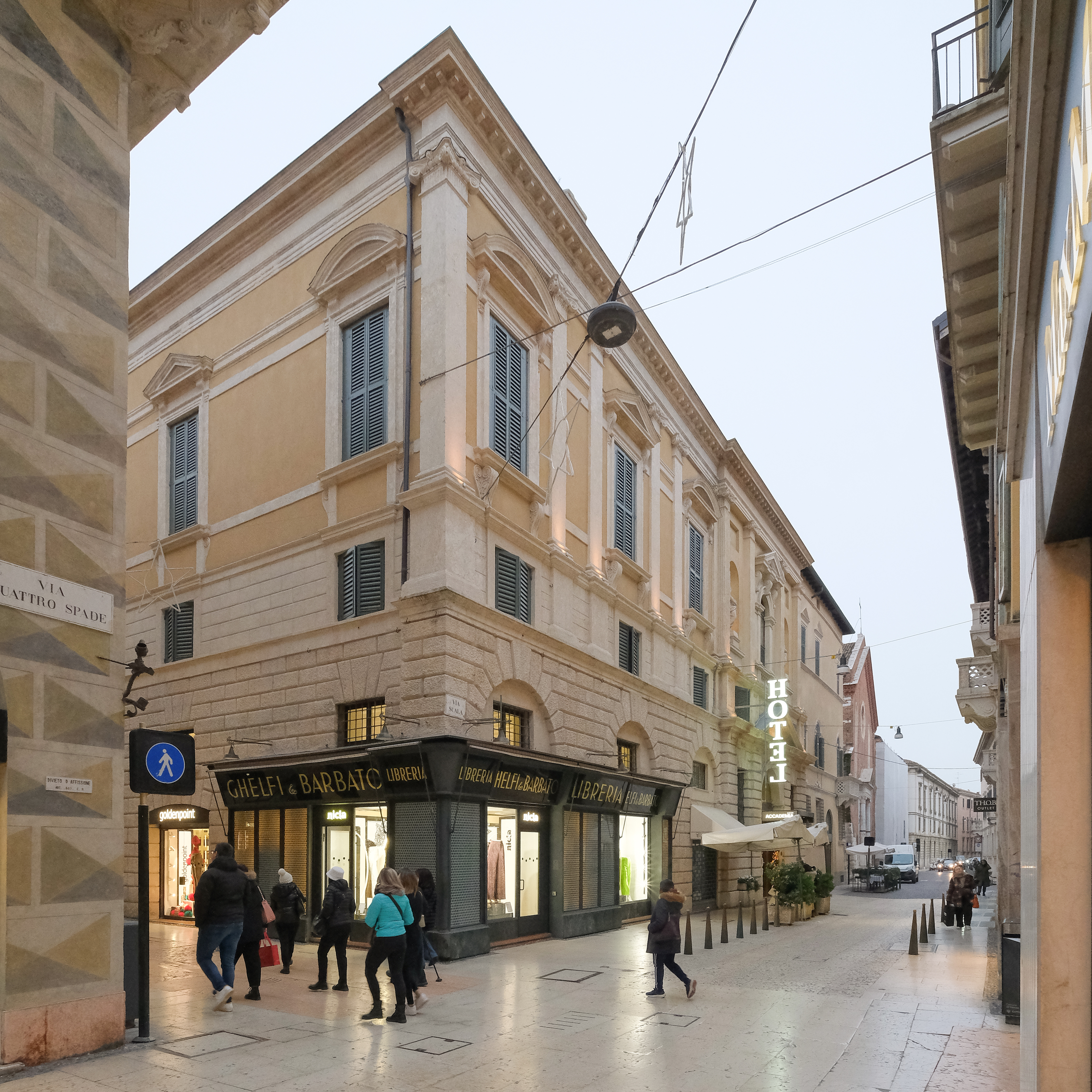
Palazzo Sambonifacio Tedeschi, Verona

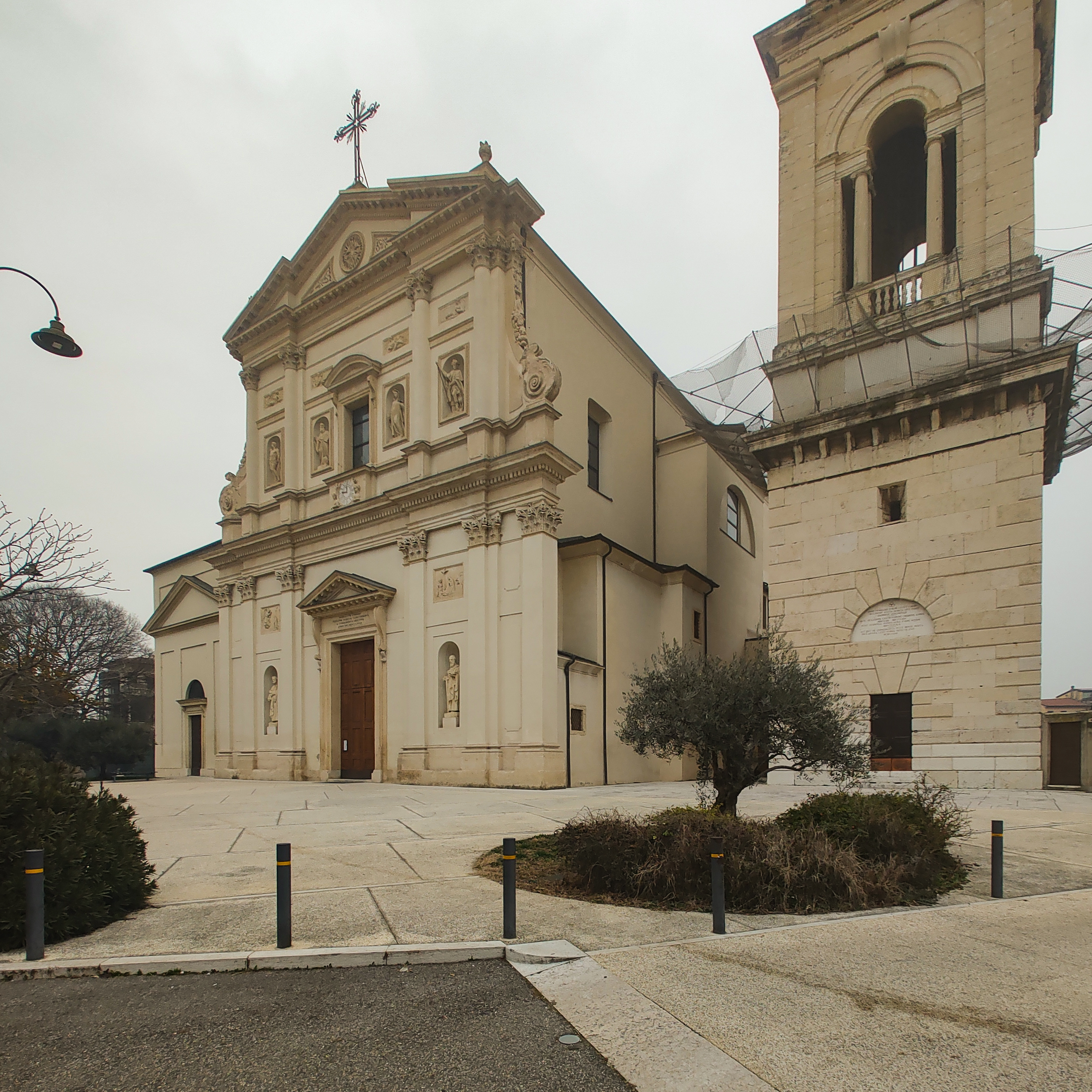
San Michele Arcangelo, Verona

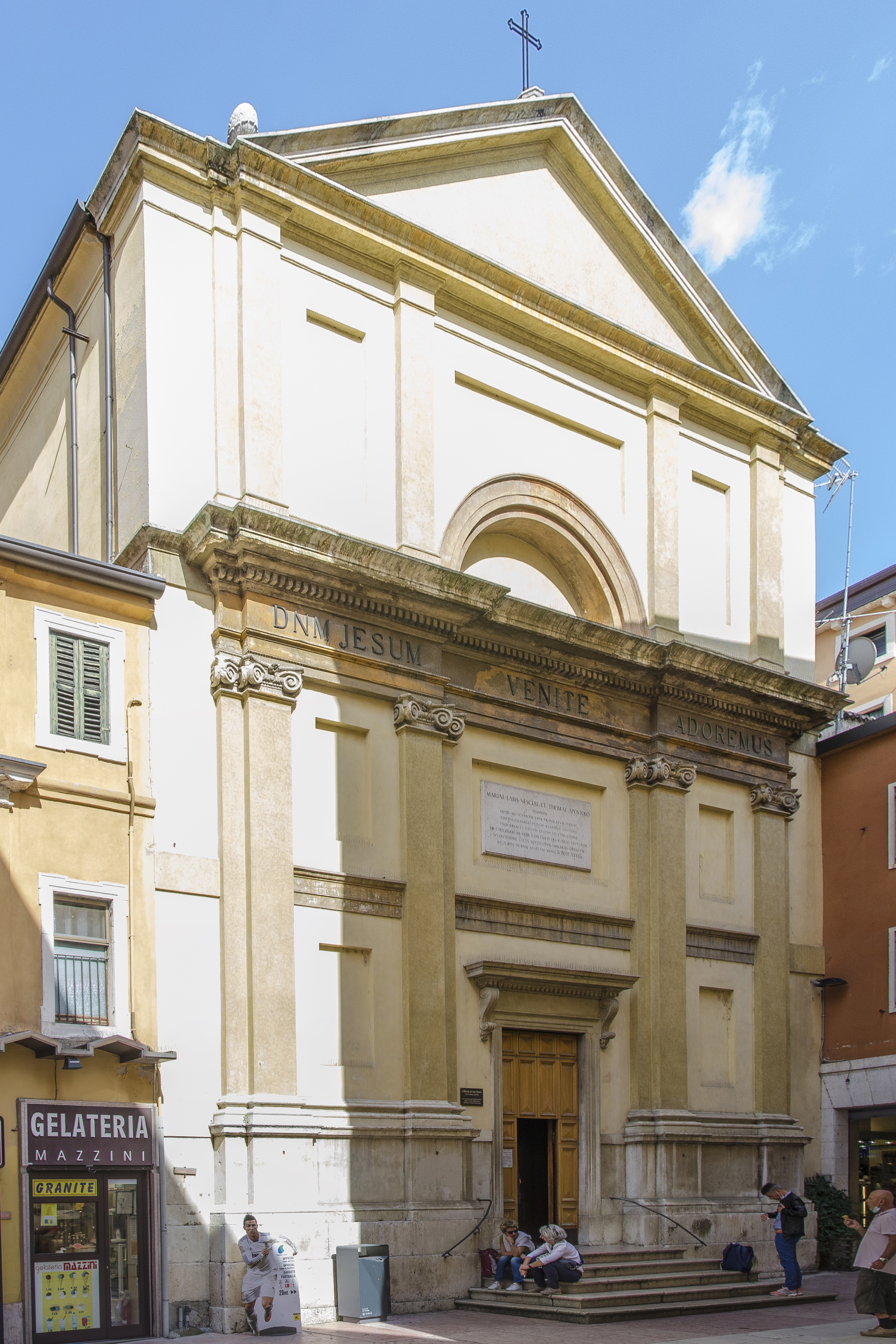
San Tomio, Verona

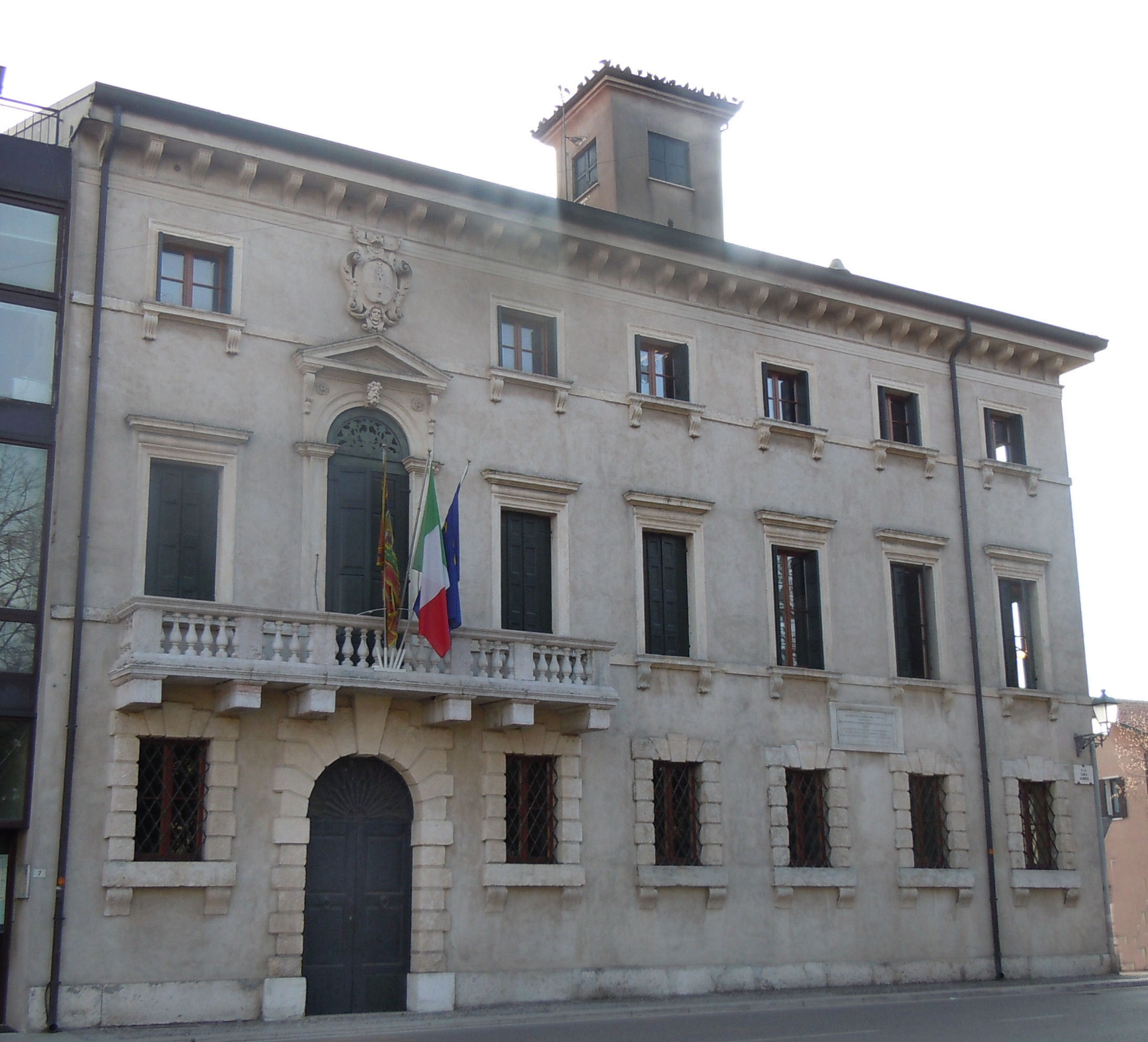
Town hall of Sommacampagna

== Sources ==
- D'Arcais, Francesca (1985). "CRISTOFALI, Adriano". Dizionario Biografico degli Italiani (in Italian). Vol. 31: Cristaldi–Dalla Nave. Rome: Istituto dell'Enciclopedia Italiana. ISBN 978-88-12-00032-6.
- "Convegno di studi su Adriano Cristofali". www.ketchup.it. Archived from the original on 22 July 2011.
