= Giorgio Dell'Agostino =

Italian canoeist

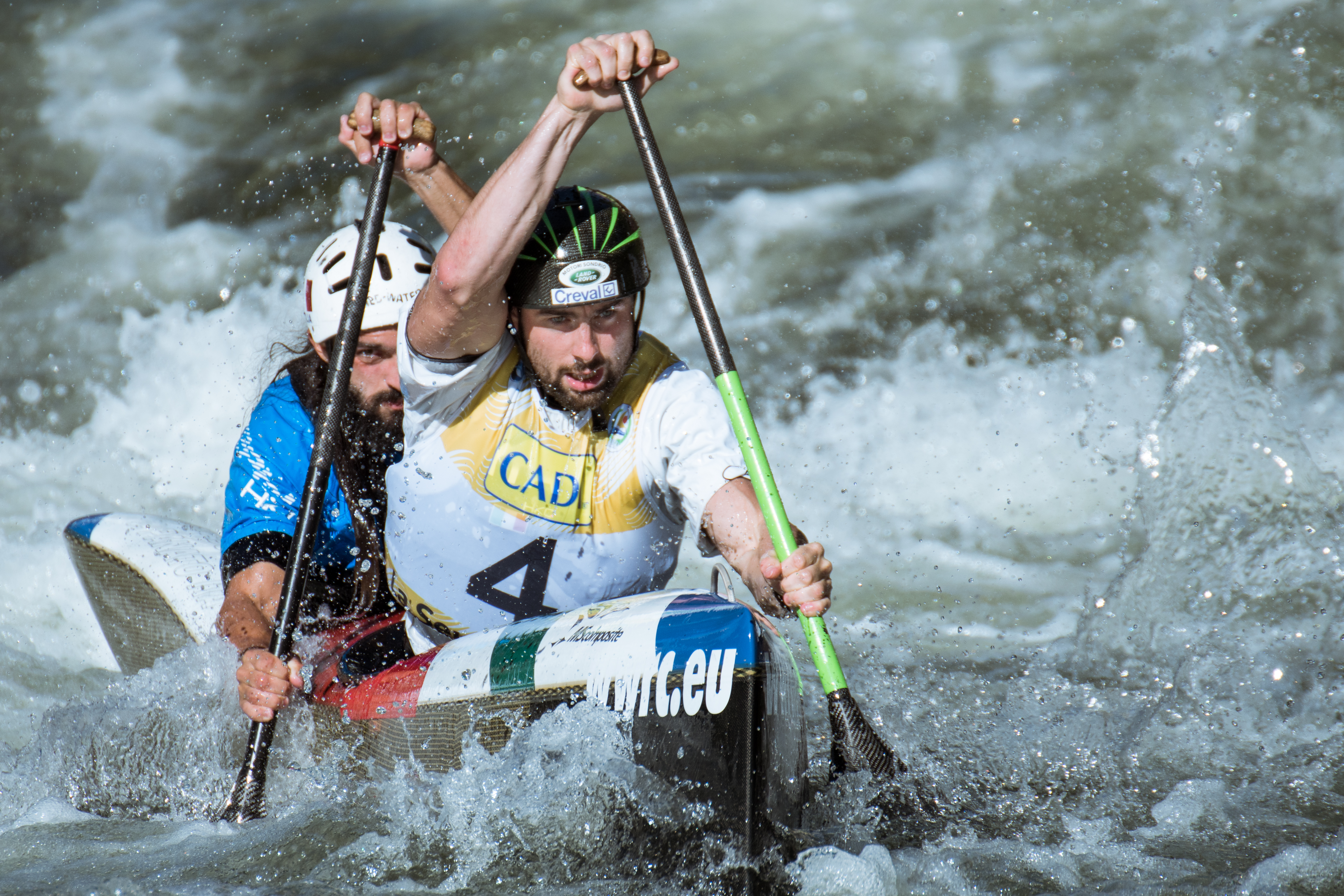
- Dell'Agostino (number 4) with Mattia Quintarelli in 2019

Personal information
- Nationality: Italian
- Born: 4 February 1995 (age 31) Sondrio, Italy

Sport
- Sport: Canoeing
- Event: Wildwater canoeing
- Club: Canoa Club Pescantina
Medal record
Event	1st	2nd	3rd
World Championships	0	0	3
European Championships	0	0	1
Total	0	0	4

Giorgio Dell'Agostino (born 4 February 1995) is an Italian male canoeist who won three medals at senior level at the Wildwater Canoeing World Championships.

== Medals at the World Championships ==
Senior

Year	1st place, gold medalist(s)	2nd place, silver medalist(s)	3rd place, bronze medalist(s)
2015	0	0	1
2017	0	0	1
2018	0	0	1
