= Ippolito Pindemonte =

Italian poet (1753–1828)

- Born: November 13, 1753; Verona, Republic of Venice
- Died: November 18, 1828 (aged 75); Verona, Kingdom of Lombardy–Venetia
- Other name: Polidete Melpomenio
- Occupation: Poet
- Writing career
- Language: Italian; Latin; Greek
- Period: 18th century; Age of Enlightenment
- Genres: Poetry; pamphlet; treatise
- Notable work: Italian translation of the Odyssey
- Movement: Neoclassicism and Pre-romanticism

Ippolito Pindemonte (November 13, 1753 – November 18, 1828) was an Italian poet. He was an exponent of Italian neoclassicism and pre-romanticism, with poems of the pastoral genre and related to graveyard poets style.

== Biography ==
Ippolito Pindemonte was born in Verona on 13 November 1753 into an aristocratic family. His brother Giovanni Pindemonte was a prominent dramatist. He was educated at the Collegio di San Carlo in Modena and became a close friend of the mathematician and translator Giuseppe Torelli and the scholar Girolamo Pompei.

He travelled to Rome in 1780 where he entered the Arcadia as Polidete Melpomenio. He wrote a first tragedy, Ulisse, in 1777, which was followed by others, and by various poems and translations. In 1788–90 he visited Switzerland, France, England, and Germany, drawing on his experiences for a novel, Abaritte (1790).

He was deeply affected by the French Revolution, residing in Paris for ten months during 1789. A brief flirtation with revolutionary ideas led to La Francia (1790), but he rejected the results of the reign of Terror and fled to Italy. He withdrew from politics and spent much of the rest of his life in his villa near Verona.

== Work ==
A Romantic poet, he was principally influenced by his friend Ugo Foscolo and Thomas Gray, and was associated with the Della Cruscans. He devoted much of his life to a translation of the Odyssey, which was published in 1822.

During his career he tried various styles of poetry in his efforts to achieve formal perfection, from the narrative of Gibilterra salvata (1782) to the discursive Epistole in versi (1804) and Sermoni (1819).

He finds his own pre-Romantic voice best in rustic poetry, publishing a first Saggio di poesie campestri in 1788. Though he abandoned his Cimiteri when he learnt of the imminent publication of Dei Sepolcri (which Foscolo dedicated to him), the unfinished poem was published with Foscolo's in a single volume in 1807.

From 1805 to 1819 he worked on his remarkable translation of the Odyssey (1822), which, rather than epic verve, displays the combination of melancholy and classical grace characteristic of pre-Romantic poetry.

Pindemonte is also the author of the short poem La melanconia ("Melancholy"), set to music by Vincenzo Bellini in the arietta Malinconia, Ninfa gentile.

== Pindemonte and Villa Mosconi Bertani ==
Ippolito Pindemonte has been resident for many years in Villa Mosconi Bertani where he was involved in the design of the romantic park, a typical English garden also inspired by the ideas of Jean-Jacques Rousseau and the design of René de Girardin.

== Works ==
- Pindemonte, Ippolito (1819). Sermoni d'Ippolito Pindemonte. Modena: Società Tipografica.

== Bibliography ==
- Stebbing, Henry (1832). "Ippolito Pindemonte". Lives of the Italian poets. Vol. 3. London: E. Bull. pp. 395–410.

== See also ==
- Vicariate of Valpolicella
