= Mattia Quintarelli =

Italian canoeist

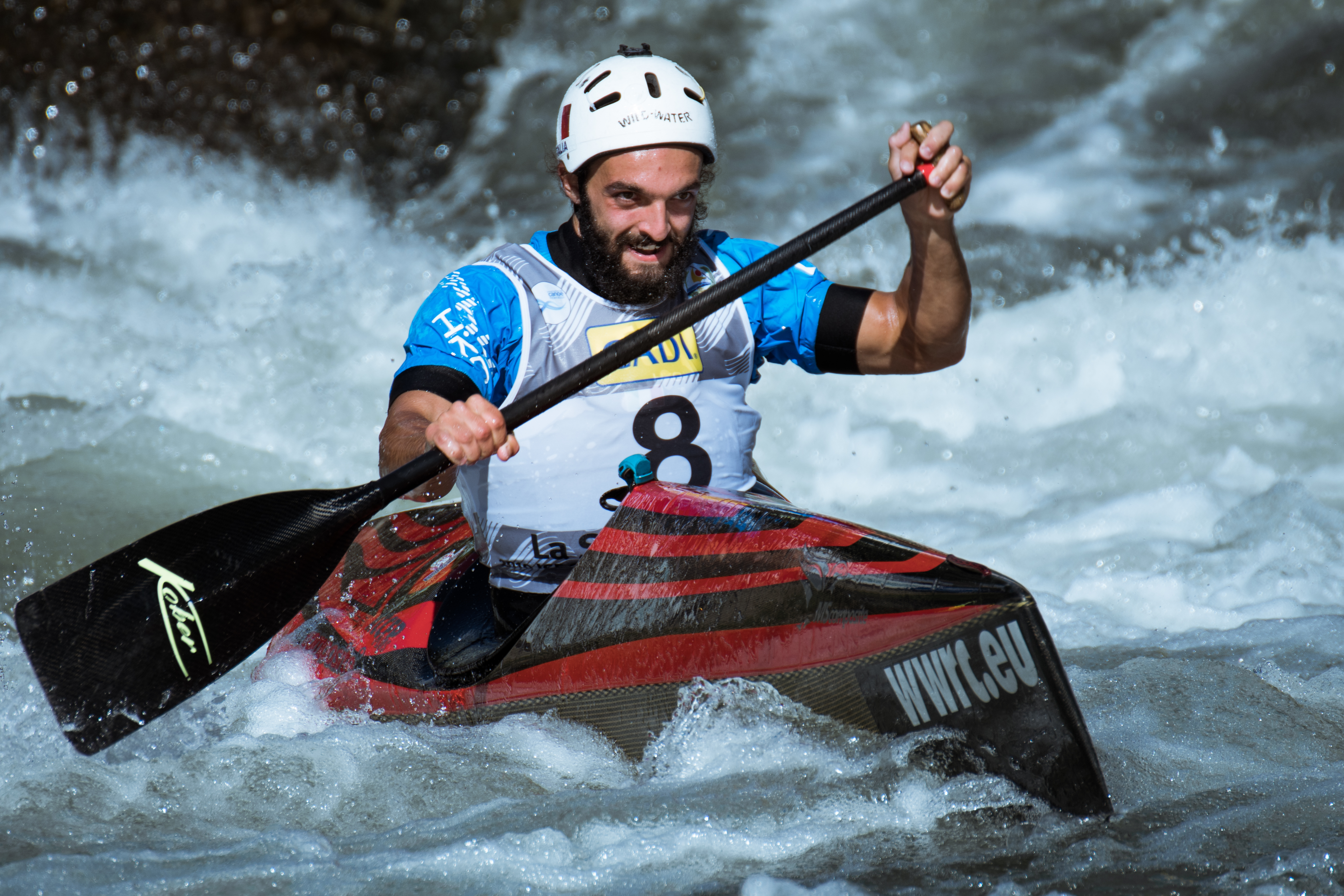
- Quintarelli in 2019

Personal information
- Nationality: Italian
- Born: 2 March 1997 (age 29) Fane, Italy

Sport
- Sport: Canoeing
- Event: Wildwater canoeing
- Club: Canoa Club Pescantina
Medal record
Event	1st	2nd	3rd
World Championships	0	0	4
European Championships	0	0	1
Total	0	0	5

Mattia Quintarelli (born 2 March 1997) is an Italian male canoeist who won four medals at senior level at the Wildwater Canoeing World Championships.

== Medals at the World Championships ==
Senior

Year	1st place, gold medalist(s)	2nd place, silver medalist(s)	3rd place, bronze medalist(s)
2015	0	0	2
2017	0	0	1
2018	0	0	1
