= Alessandro Pompei =

Italian architect, art theorist and painter (1705–1772)

- Born: 6 July 1705; Verona, Republic of Venice
- Died: 1 October 1772 (aged 67); Garda, Veneto, Republic of Venice
- Occupations: Architect, art theorist, painter
- Movement: Neoclassicism

Alessandro Pompei (6 July 1705 – 1 October 1772) was an Italian architect, art theorist, and painter. He was part of the Neoclassical movement.

== Biography ==
=== Early career ===
Pompei was born on 6 July 1705, in Verona. His father was a wealthy Veronese noble, and his mother came from a noble family in Vicenza. Pompei attended the Collegio dei Nobili at Parma, where he studied drawing and painting with Clemente Ruta. Subsequently he trained with the painter Antonio Balestra in Verona.

In 1728, Pompei was admitted to the Accademia dei Filotimi in Verona, and from this time onwards he held several important appointments on the city council. After a trip to Rome in 1729, he began to show a preference for architecture, which he had studied as an amateur, probably under the influence of Francesco Scipione Maffei.

In 1731, Pompei began to make drawings from the buildings of Michele Sanmicheli, which later formed the basis of a treatise (1735) on the latter’s life and his use of the Classical orders in comparison with those of Vitruvius, Alberti, Palladio, Scamozzi, Serlio and Vignola. The treatise’s preface emphasizes the need for a strictly Classical language and vehemently condemns the misuses and degeneration of the ‘modern’ style of architecture after Borromini.

=== Mature work ===
Meanwhile, Pompei was testing his own ideas in a simply styled reconstruction (1731–37) of the family villa at Illasi, near Verona, decorated with his own frescoes and oil paintings. During this period he was also commissioned by Maffei to design the fluted Doric Loggia (1734–46) for the courtyard of the Museo Lapidario, Verona. In 1739, in addition to visiting Rome with Adriano Cristofali, who later became an architect, Pompei became interested in a text that was useful in the continued struggle against the Baroque: the manuscript treatise (1621) of Teofilo Gallaccini, Sopra gli errori degli architetti, the publication of which was later promoted in Venice by Joseph Smith.

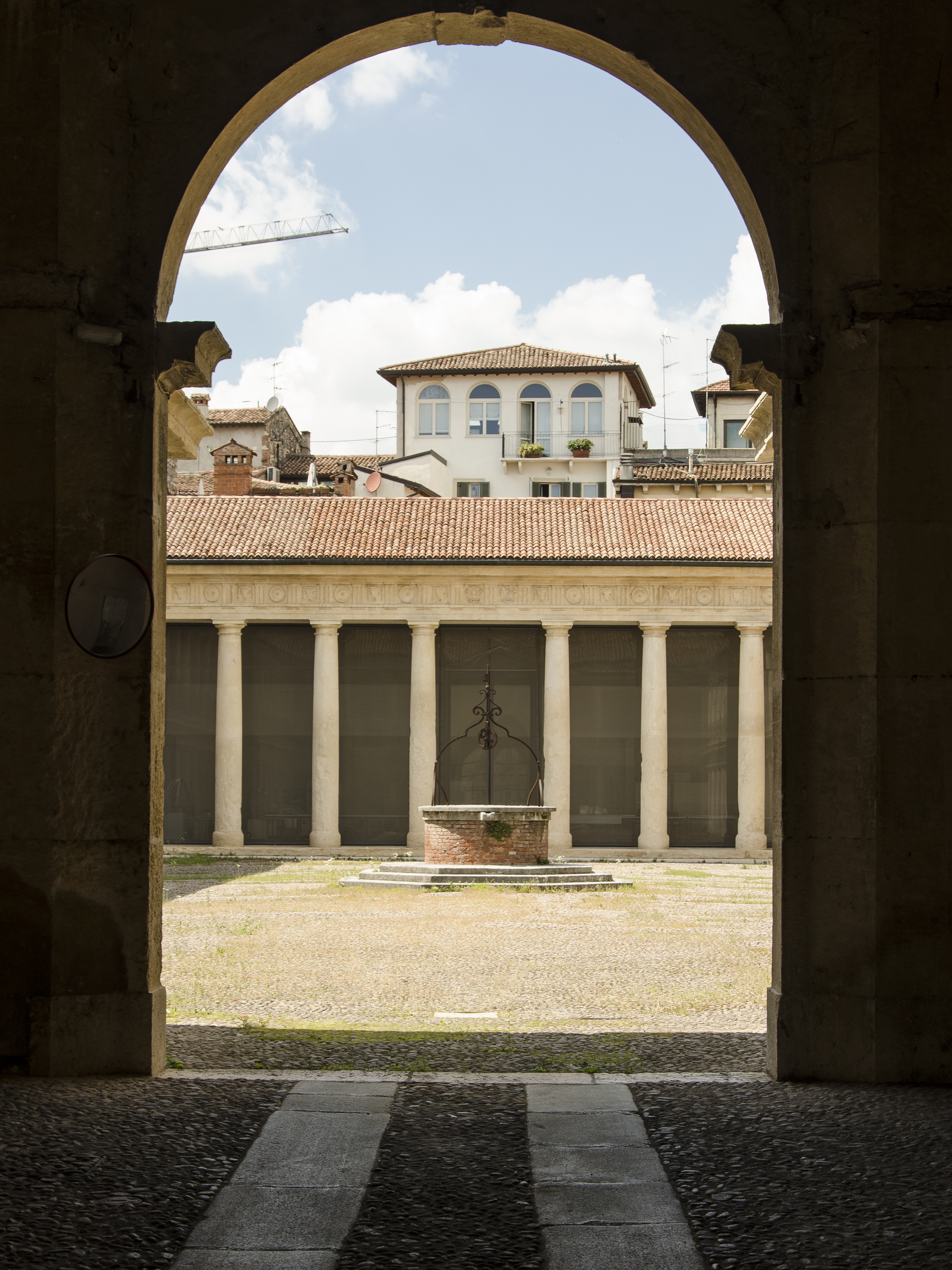
Dogana of San Fermo

This was followed by a number of other projects in and around Verona: designs for the Villa Giuliari (1739–43) at Settimo di Gallese with a Tuscan portico and Tuscan colonnades flanking the main block; for the restructuring and restoration of the garden façade of the Palazzo Spolverini (1740) in Verona; and for the Palazzo Pindemonte (1742) at Vo'. In these, emphasis was again placed on the strict and correct usage of the basic classical vocabulary. In Pompei’s most important work, the Dogana (1744–63) of San Fermo, Verona, he developed the Tuscan Loggia theme. There the Classical vocabulary assumed ideological overtones by re-evoking the importance of Verona in Roman times and by expressing the magnificence, pride and autonomy of the city’s aristocracy.

Pompei was also responsible for several religious buildings: the churches of San Giacomo Maggiore (1756) and San Paolo in Campo Marzo (1763) in Verona and the oratory of the Blessed Virgin at Sanguinetto. In addition to providing plans for a number of smaller works and numerous restoration projects for villas and houses, he was also involved in hydraulic engineering projects, in particular for reclaiming the Valli Grandi Veronesi (1771). He was also a founder-member of the Accademia di Pittura (1764) and of the Accademia di Agricoltura (1768), both in Verona.

== Writings ==
- Li cinque ordini dell’architettura civile di M. Sanmicheli (Verona, 1735).
