= Villa Bettoni =

Coordinates: 45.6770°N 10.6532°E

Villa Bettoni is a large lake-side Neoclassical-style rural palace located in the frazione of Bogliaco, on the shores of Lake Garda, within the town limits of Gargnano, Province of Brescia, region of Lombardy, Italy. The villa includes lakefront and gardens.

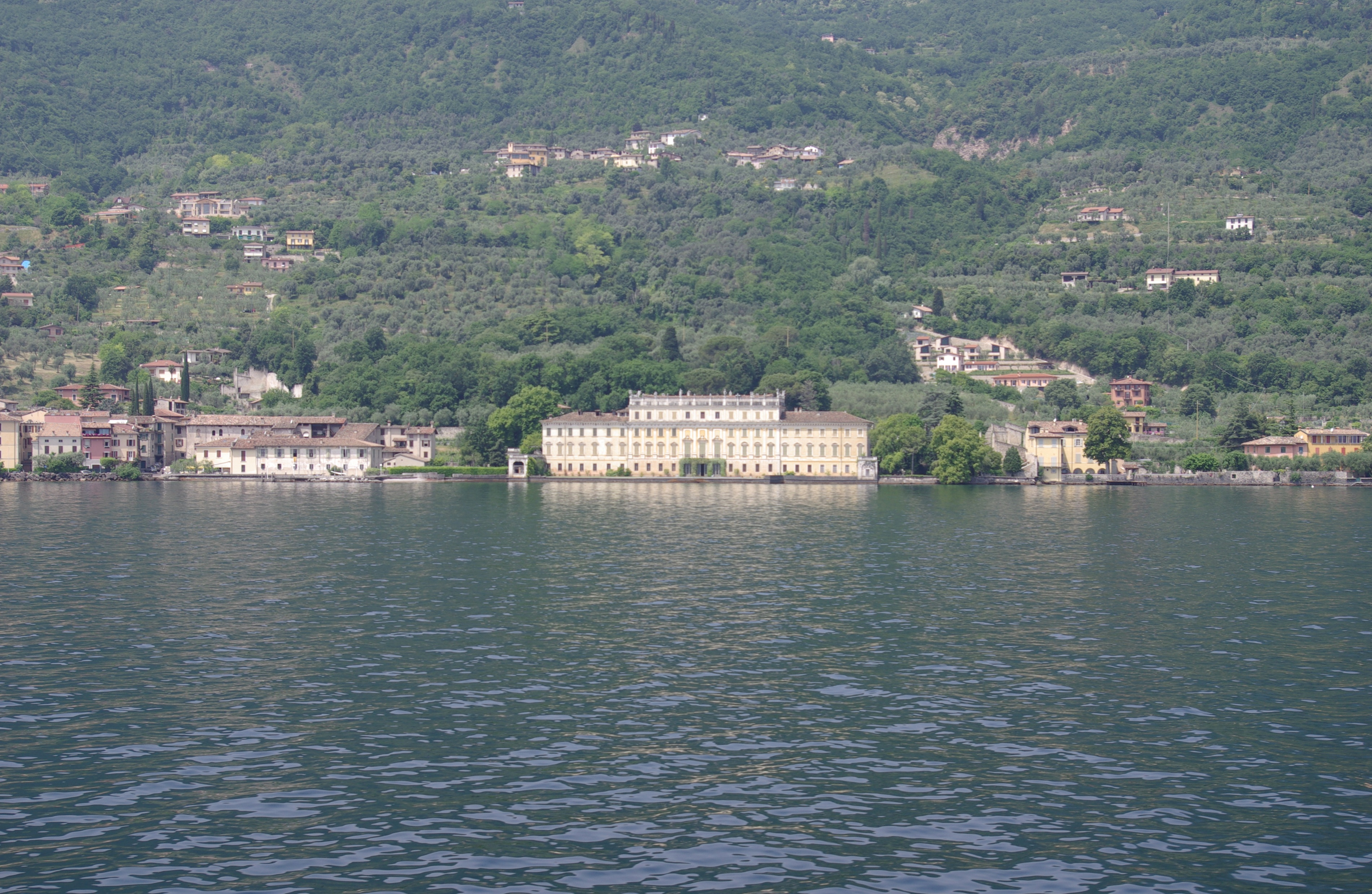
Facade from Lake Garda

== History ==
By 1752, due to their services to the Holy Roman Emperors, the Bettoni family had been granted the title as Counts. The extended family decided to build a villa matching their wealth at this site, which they had owned since the 15th century.

Initially they briefly employed Adriano Cristofali, but he was dismissed in 1753. Work was restarted by Count Carlo Bettoni in 1756 with a design commissioned from Antonio Marchetti. Carlo's brother, Count Giovanni Maria, commissioned the rational garden layout (1764-1768) from Amerigo Vincenzo Pierallini, which includes a Nymphaeum-like exedra structure dedicated to the theme of Apollo. In niches of this hill-side folly are allegorical sculptures of virtues including charity, glory, power, honor, faith, hunting prowess, and prudence.

The multistory villa block presents imposing facades on both the garden and lake-sides. The lake-side central block has colossal order pilasters atop a rusticate stone base. The lakeside roof-top balustrade has a marble pantheon of the pagan gods including Bacchus, Ceres, Jove, Venus, Pluto, Tethys, Juno, and mercury sculpted by Giovanni Battista Locatelli.

The inside has frescoes by Bernardino and Fabrizio Galliari depicting in allegory the marriage of service and wisdom (Mercury and Minerva); and power and beauty (Hercules and Omphale). The main dining room has a cycle of paintings by Alessandro Campo, a member of the studio of Andrea Celesti. One of the rooms has a large equestrian portrait of Field-marshal Bettoni.

During the end of the Second World War, the villa housed one of the ministers of the ill-fated Nazi-protectorate of the Republic of Salò. The villa is still privately owned by the Bettoni family.
