= Giovanni Battista Locatelli (sculptor) =

Italian sculptor

- Born: 17 November 1734; Verona
- Died: 18 May 1805 (aged 70)
- Known for: Sculptor

Giovanni Battista Locatelli (1734–1805), also called John Baptist Locatelli was an Italian sculptor known for a well publicized dispute with George Walpole, 3rd Earl of Orford and the Royal Academy.

== Biography ==
Locatelli was born in Verona on 17 November 1734. After working in Verona and Padua during his early career, he was working in London from at least 1775 until 1796, when he returned to Italy. There is some evidence to suggest he may have worked for a time in the late 1790s in Paris before ending his career in Milan under the patronage of Napoleon Bonaparte. English contemporaries often referred to him as John Baptist Locatelli – an Anglicization of his common Italian forenames.

== Career ==
=== Early career ===
He began his career in his native Italy and was a member of the Venetian Academy. Early examples of his work include several sculptures for the Villa Bettoni near his hometown of Verona. When he first arrived in London he was living at the Haymarket with fellow Italian immigrant Ananso Rossi, father of sculptor Charles Rossi who became a pupil of Locatelli Locatelli was occasionally employed in the workshop of Joseph Nollekens where he was supposedly mistaken for the master himself due to his 'superior manners' and his 'dashing mode of dressing in a fashionable coat and red morocco slippers'.

During his time in England, he received commissions from the famous architect Robert Adam, including a chimneypiece for Harewood House. He also supplied a chimneypiece for the art critic William Locke at Norbury Park. One of his most notable works is the reclining plaster sculpture of Giovanna Baccelli, the Italian dancer and mistress to the Duke of Dorset.

Despite his later conflicts with the Royal Academy, Locatelli was initially on good terms with that institution. He was gifted £50 when in financial trouble in 1780 and was then paid £64 in 1781 for another ornamented fireplace in Somerset House, headquarters of the Academy at the time.

=== Dispute with Lord Orford ===
He came to public notice in his own time due to a high-profile dispute with George Walpole, 3rd Earl of Orford and the artistic establishment of the Royal Academy. As was common for many talented sculptors of the time, Locatelli mainly worked in the studios of a small group of established masters. Works sold under the names of some of these sculptors, such as Nollekens, were in fact often modelled by uncredited and now often forgotten artists. This allowed famous sculptors to produce a significantly larger volume of work under their name than would otherwise be possible. It was no coincidence that these names were also members of the Royal Academy, a body which became responsible for commissioning of many of the new public sculptures springing up in the late 18th century. Matthew Craske describes the revelation to the public of unfair practices as being influenced by the upsurge of public monumental art following the Seven Years' War and the subsequent national pride.

Locatelli became disenchanted with the system, which he viewed as enriching the established sculptors and exploiting those without the capital to set up their own studios. He published pamphlets and articles in newspapers such as The World, shedding light on these practices. Craske describes three factors that fueled growing discontent between those at the top and those at the bottom of the sculpture world: "the foundation of the Royal Academy, shifts in the ways designs were evaluated, and a growing number of very lucrative contracts for public sculpture."

Since the foundation of the Royal Academy in 1768 and the increase in memorialisation of public figures with public money, the power to distribute these commissions became concentrated in very few hands. Locatelli believed that he was not being recognized as befitted an artist of his stature and was very vocal in the British press. The instigating incident for his public complaints was the argument with George Walpole, 3rd Earl of Orford, who refused to pay for a commission in 1788. It is described as a ‘colossal’ group depicting Hercules and Theseus dragging Cerberus from Tartarus. The pedestal depicted several other labours of Hercules in basso rilievo.

Locatelli entered into the commission, which took him two years to complete, without establishing a price. When he presented a bill for £2400, Orford refused to pay it, and the case was referred to a committee of artists from the Royal Academy. This consisted of sculptors John Bacon, Thomas Banks, Agostino Carlini, Nollekens, William Tyler and Joseph Wilton. William Locke, whom Locatelli had worked for previously, was chosen as arbiter.

On Orford's side, the sum was considered exorbitant, and Locatelli was subsequently attacked as having cast the piece from plaster rather than carving it from marble. Locatelli countered this in the press by stating that he had in fact used scagliola, an experimental material of gypsum and glue usually confined to architectural features. Locatelli's use of this material harmed his case as the committee viewed it as inferior to carved marble. Considering the workshop practices of the time, Locatelli considered this hypocritical and continued to demand the full price. His dispute spilt over into personal attacks on the appointed judges, calling Bacon an "emperor of the arts" and a "monopoly trader". In the end, Locatelli was paid £1400 for the work. The final piece was lost in a fire at Houghton Hall in December 1789, which, due to the notoriety of the case, was reported by several newspapers of the day.

William Godwin went with James Barry to see the sculpture on 1 July 1788 at the height of the public furore. John Thomas Smith, in his biography of Nollekens, goes some way to defend Orford. He claims that Orford had been very kind to Locatelli and that Nollekens and the other judges had reviewed the work very poorly. Smith claims that it was the poor quality of the work that Orford objected to. The principal source for Smith's account, however, was Locatelli's student Rossi. Rossi may be coloured by his relationship with Locatelli, giving Smith the impression that Rossi's own skill as a sculptor was nothing to do with his former master's tutelage.

=== Return to Italy ===
The exact date of Locatelli's return to Italy is unknown. He may have travelled by way of Paris, working on some restorations at the Louvre in 1799. He is known to have worked on the Foro Buonaparte in Milan and supposedly gained a pension for life from Napoleon. He died on 18 May 1805.
