= Pietro Boselli =

Italian model and engineer

- Born: 3 December 1988 (age 37); Negrar, Veneto, Italy
- Education: University College London (BEng, PhD)
- Occupations: Model; engineer; teacher
- Years active: 2004–present
- Modeling information
- Height: 6 ft 1 in (185 cm)
- Hair color: Brown
- Eye color: Hazel
- Agency: Models 1
- Website: pietroboselli.com

Pietro Boselli (born 3 December 1988) is an Italian model, engineer, and former mathematics postgraduate teacher at University College London. He completed his PhD in November 2014 in the Department of Engineering, on the topic of "An Inverse Design Methodology for Long Last-Stage Steam Turbine Blades."

== Biography ==
Pietro, the eldest of four brothers, was born in Negrar, Verona, but was raised in Brescia, which he considers his hometown. When he was 6 years old, he was discovered by an agent, and began his modelling career with Armani Junior. He completed his secondary education at Liceo Scientifico Statale Annibale Calini in 2007.

He subsequently relocated to London at the age of 18 to pursue studies in mechanical engineering at University College London (UCL). He graduated with a first-class degree (BEng) in 2010 and obtained a PhD in computational fluid dynamics in 2016. During his doctoral studies, he served as a teaching assistant from September 2010 to June 2013, a lecturer from September 2013 to June 2014, and a visiting lecturer from October 2014 to March 2015 at UCL.

In 2015, a Facebook post from 2014 by one of his students, which mentioned that he was also a successful model, went viral. In response to his rising prominence, Boselli has expressed appreciation but has also publicly opposed the 'dumb model' stereotype and similar prejudices on multiple occasions.

In subsequent years, Boselli expanded his presence across various social media platforms, including Instagram, Facebook, X, TikTok, and YouTube, as well as subscription-based channels. He characterizes his content as advocating for fitness, the symbiotic relationship between body and mind, and philosophical discourse. Furthermore, Boselli remains faithful to his Italian heritage and scientific background in his content, promoting Mediterranean cuisine and employing scientific reasoning. This combination, together with his inherent masculine physique, has enabled him to amass and sustain a cumulative following of over 5 million users. Consequently, he can be considered a mega social media influencer. Boselli’s social media presence and approach appeal to and engage an audience that is not solely attracted by a masculine physique but also appreciates intellectual engagement.

== Modeling ==
Boselli is represented by British modelling agency Models 1. In 2014, he won first place at the World Beauty Fitness & Fashion (WBFF) European ProAm event in the fitness model category. He has appeared in American modeling campaigns for clothing retailer Abercrombie & Fitch and fitness club Equinox, as well as for the fashion house Moschino and Vogue magazine. He has also appeared in spreads for GQ Style and has been featured on the cover of Attitude.

In 2016, he was signed by Armani for their EA7 campaign. In the same year, he founded sportswear brand Petra Design. In August 2020, he was featured on a lenticular cover of GQ Italia, which alternated between his image and an image of Michelangelo's David. The magazine was successfully sued by the Galleria dell'Accademia, which holds the image rights to the statue, for using a photograph of the statue without their permission.
