= Clemente Sibiliato =

Italian cleric, poet, and librarian (1719–1795)

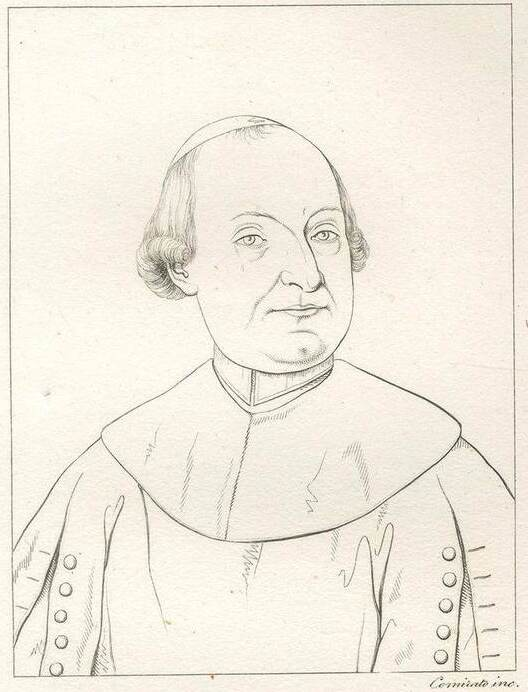
Clemente Sibiliato

Clemente Sibiliato or Sibilato (10 February 1719 – 14 February 1795) was an Italian cleric, poet, and librarian.

== Biography ==
He was born in Bovolenta, near Padua. He entered seminary at Padua, was ordained a priest, and became a professor at the young age of 25 years. By 1759, he was named professor of Latin and Greek at the University of Padua. He often wrote poems dedicated to patrons and occasions. He became a member of the Accademia dei Ricovrati and the Reale Accademia di scienze e belle lettere of Mantua.

== Works ==
In 1792, Sibiliato published the biography of the mathematician Giuseppe Torelli (1721–1781). Among his other works are:

- Oratio in funere Benedicti XIV (in Latin). Patavii: Typis Seminarii. 1738.
- De Eloquentia Marci Foscarini Venetorum ducis (in Latin). Patavii: ex Typographia Seminarii. 1765.
- Dissertazione sopra il quesito: Se la poesia influisca nel bene dello stato, e come possa essere l'oggetto dell politica (in Italian). Mantova: per l'erede di Alberto Pazzoni, Regio-Ducale Stampatore. 1771.
- Memoria sopra lo spirito filosofico delle belle lettere (in Italian).
- Lettere del Conte Algarotti e dell'Abate Sibiliato sopra la spiegazione di due passi di Virgilio nel libro II della Georgica (in Italian).
- Saggio di discorsi per ciascun giorno della quaresima del signor abate di Breteville (in Italian). Padova: tipografia del Seminario. 1750.
- Principi di religione, ossia Preservativo contro l'incredulità (in Italian). Padova: pel Seminario. 1753.

== Bibliography ==
- Galtarossa, Massimo (2018). "SIBILIATO, Clemente". Dizionario Biografico degli Italiani (in Italian). Vol. 92: Semino–Sisto IV. Rome: Istituto dell'Enciclopedia Italiana. ISBN 978-88-12-00032-6.
