= Negrar di Valpolicella =

- Comune
- Comune di Negrar di Valpolicella
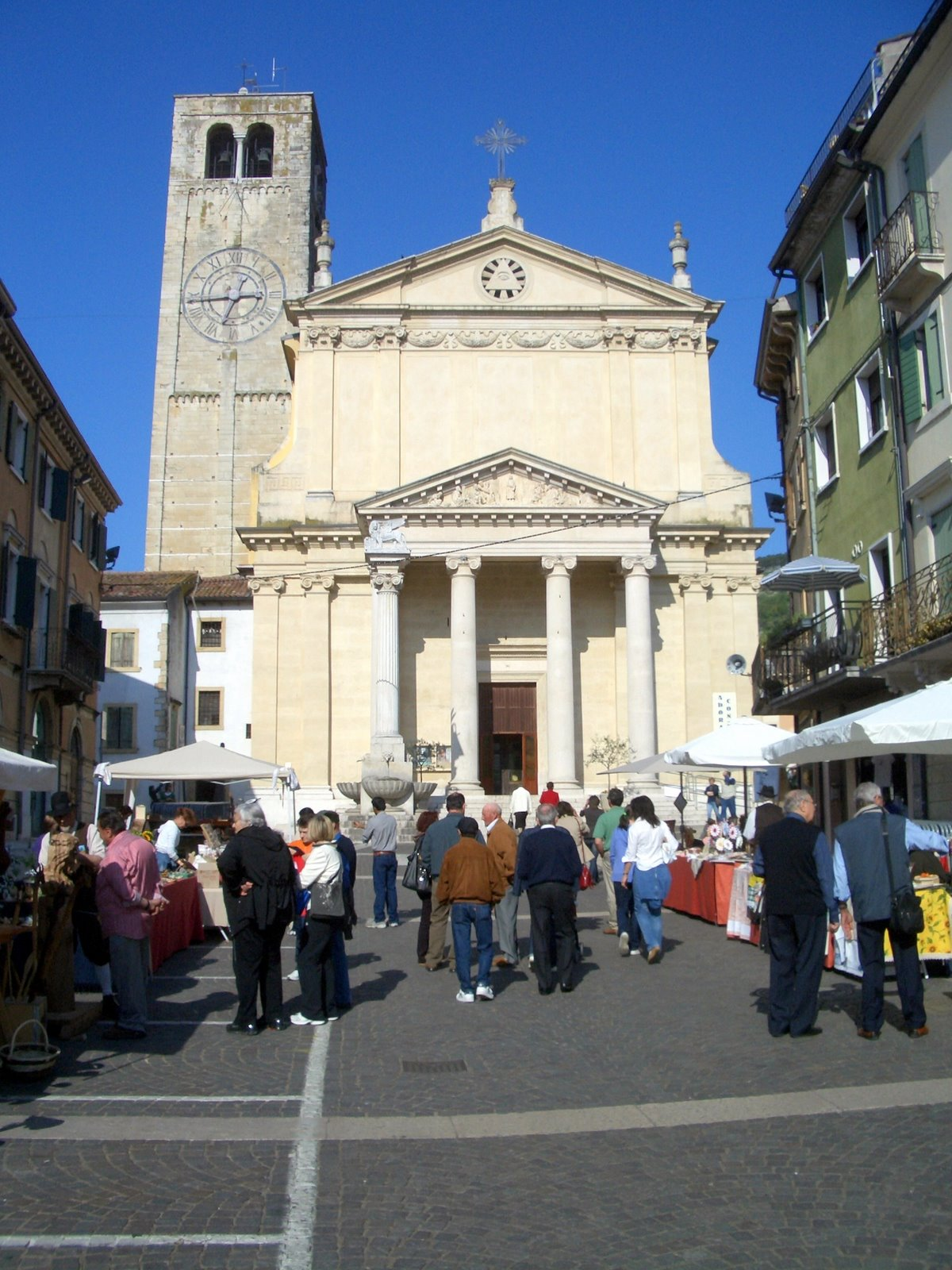

- Flag Coat of arms

- Location within Italy Location within Veneto
- Coordinates: 45°32′N 10°56′E
- Country: Italy
- Region: Veneto
- Province: Verona (VR)
- Frazioni: Arbizzano, Jago, Fane, Mazzano, Montecchio, Prun, Santa Maria, Torbe

Government
  - Mayor: Fausto Rossignioli (Action, elected with: transversal coalition)

Area
  - Total: 40.5 km^{2} (15.6 sq mi)
- Elevation: 190 m (620 ft)

Population (2015)
  - Total: 17,119
  - Density: 423/km^{2} (1,090/sq mi)
- Demonym: Negraresi
- Time zone: UTC+1 (CET)
  - Summer (DST): UTC+2 (CEST)
- Postal code: 37024 capoluogo, 37020 frazioni
- Dialing code: 045
- Patron saint: Saint Martin
- Website: Official website

Negrar di Valpolicella is a comune (municipality) in the Province of Verona in the Italian region Veneto, about 110 kilometres (68 mi) west of Venice and about 12 kilometres (7 mi) northwest of Verona. Since 8 February 2019, the official name has been changed to "Negrar di Valpolicella" (L.R. n. 7, 8 February 2019) after a referendum was held in the town.

== History ==
In prehistoric times, it was a center of the Arusnati, a not-well-known population of perhaps mixed origins. In the Middle Ages it was a free commune until it was acquired by the Scaliger of Verona (14th century). Later it was part of the Republic of Venice, under which, in 1791, it received the right to hold a livestock market. In 2020 the municipality announced that a Roman villa had been discovered beneath a local vineyard.

=== Archaeology ===
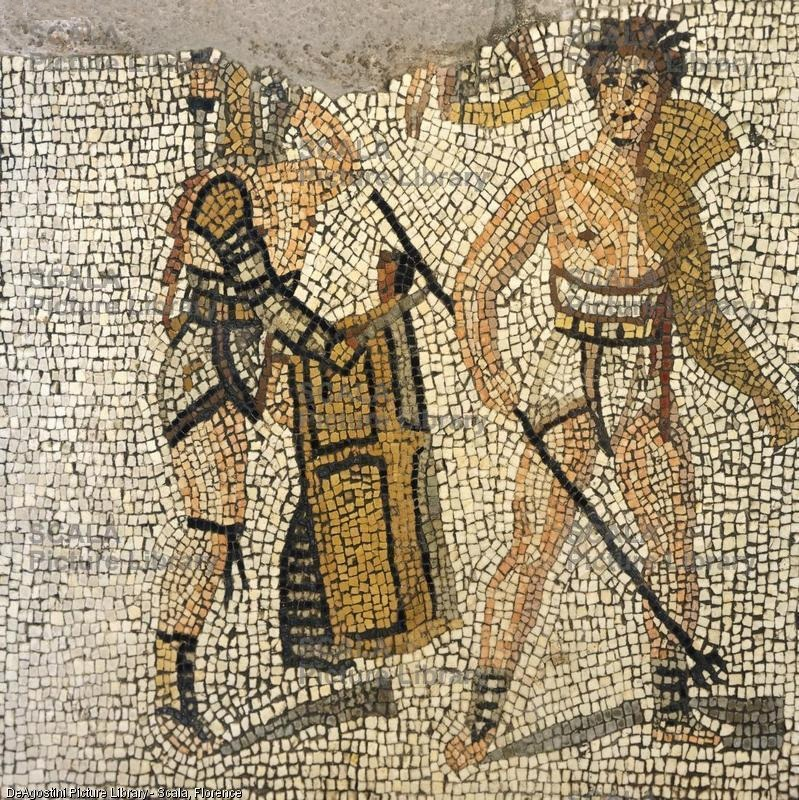
Mosaico Negrar

In May 2020, the discovery of a well-preserved Roman mosaic floor dating to the 3rd century AD buried underneath a vineyard is reported after about a century of searching the site of a long-lost villa.

== Economy ==
Negrar and its villages are mainly devoted to agriculture, with production of cherries, vine and fruit, and of wines such as Valpolicella, Amarone and Recioto.

== Notable people ==
- Andrea Benvenuti, athlete
- Pietro Boselli, engineer, former mathematician and model
- Davide Formolo, cyclist
- Matteo Manassero, professional golfer
- Damiano Tommasi, ex professional footballer, mayor of Verona
- Ronnie Quintarelli, racing driver.

== Gallery ==
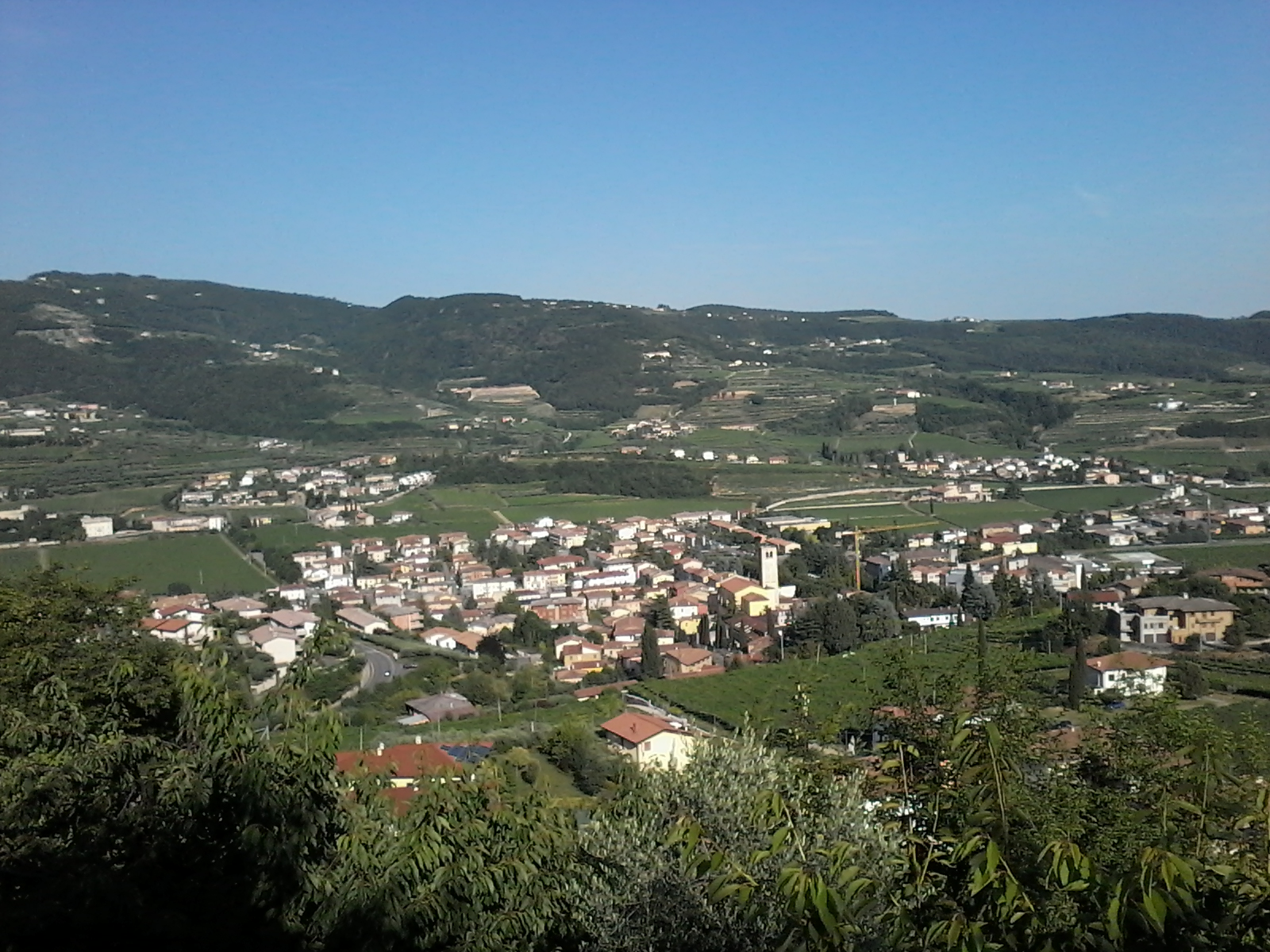
Panorama

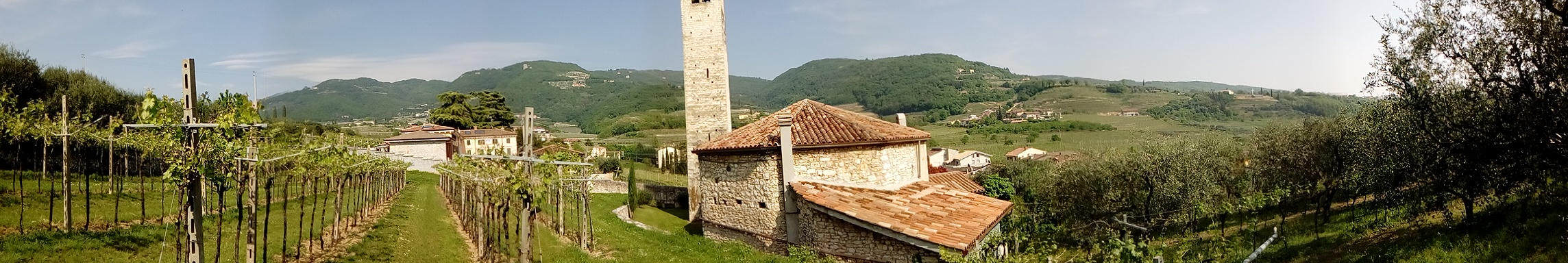
vineyards

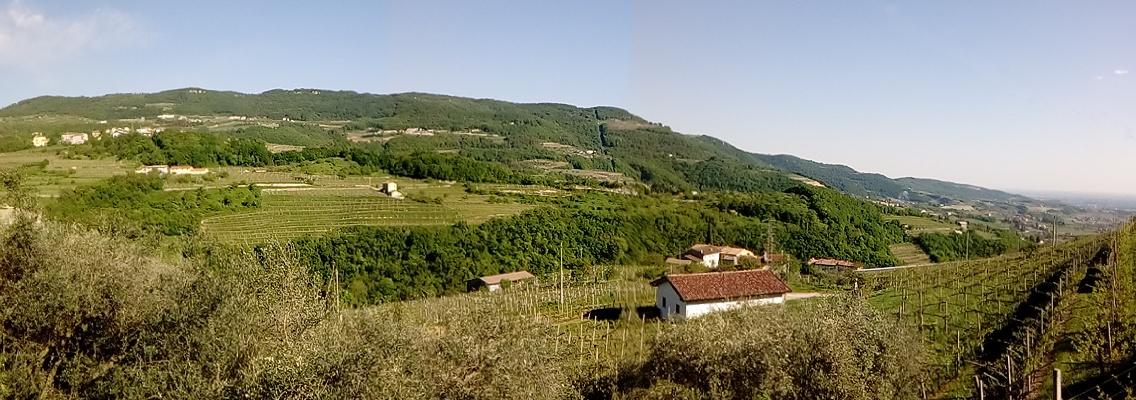
vineyards

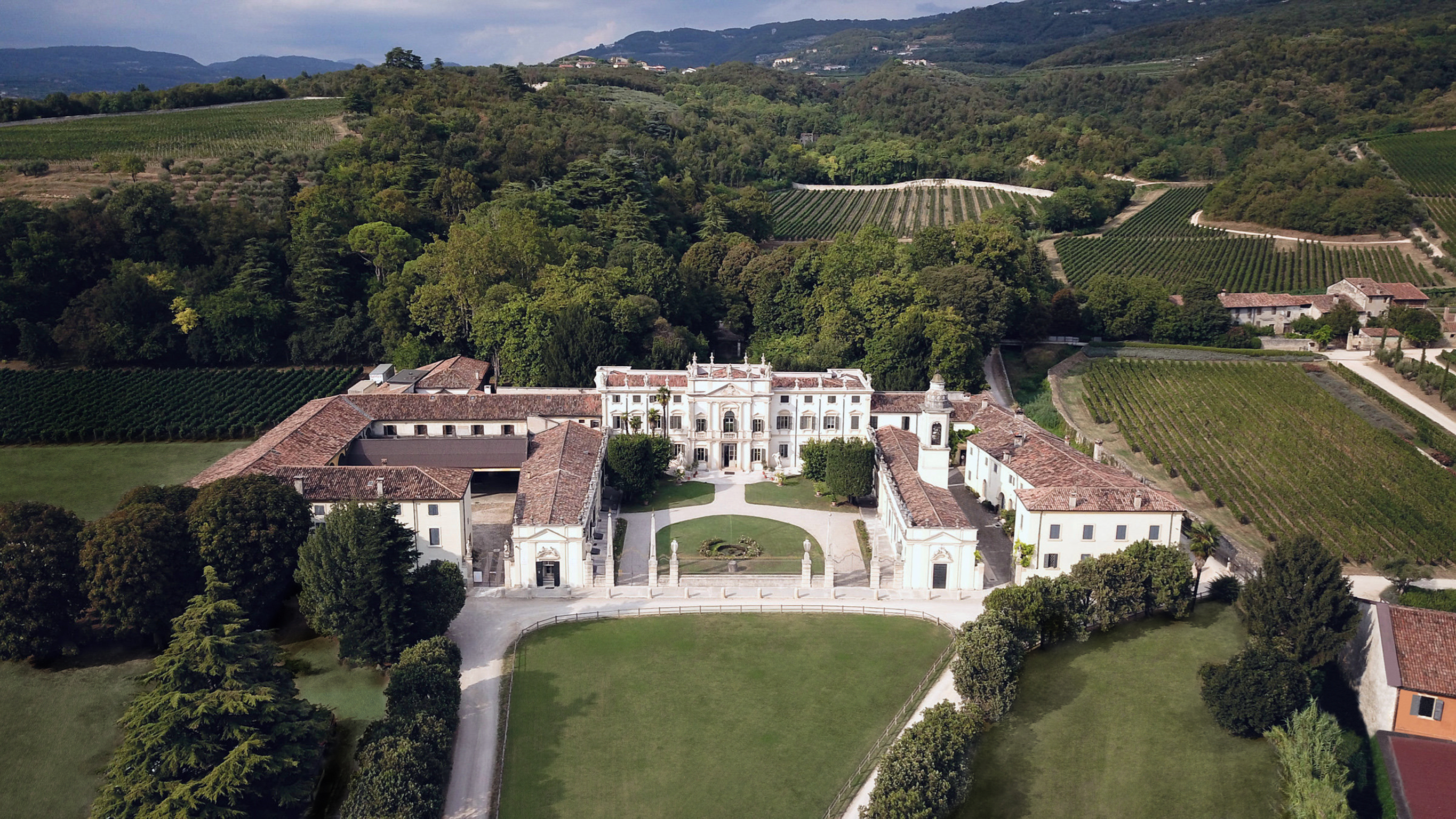
Villa Mosconi Bertani and Amarone vineyards

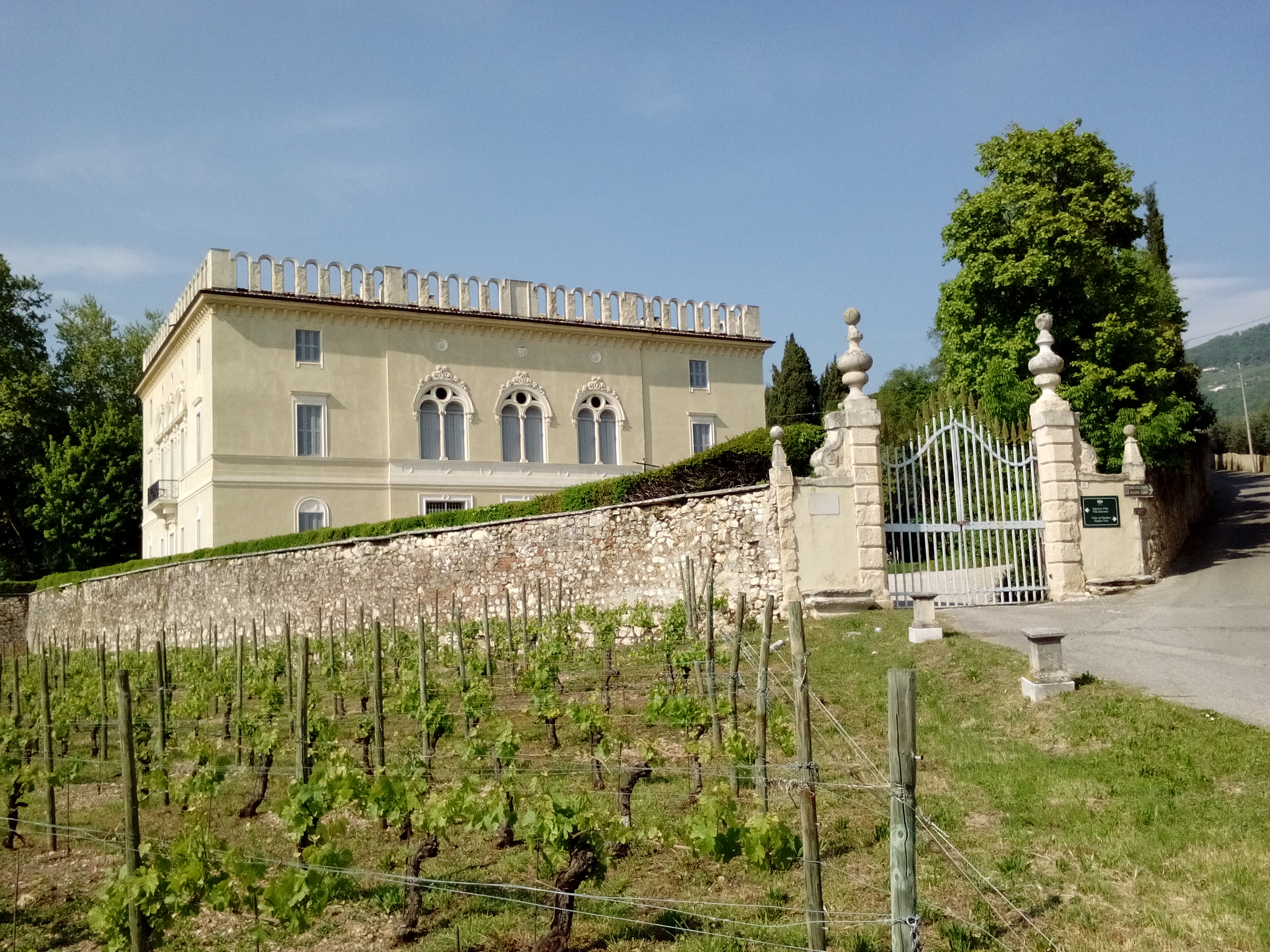
Villa Rizzardi and Amarone vineyards
