= Giambattista Spolverini =

Italian Neoclassical poet

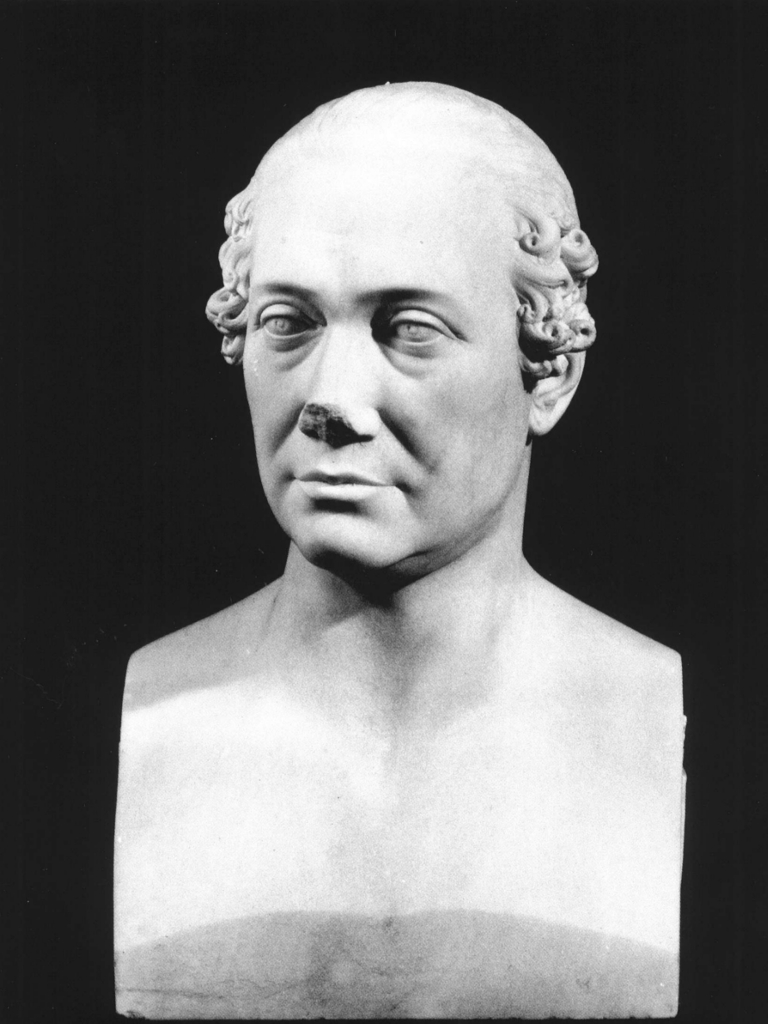
- Bust of Giambattista Spolverini. Panteon Veneto, Istituto Veneto di Scienze, Lettere ed Arti
- Born: 25 June 1695; Verona, Republic of Venice
- Died: 24 November 1762 (aged 67); Verona, Republic of Venice
- Occupation: Poet
- Spouse: Savina Trissino (m. 1733)
- Children: 12
- Writing career
- Literary movement: Neoclassicism

Giambattista Spolverini (25 June 1695 – 24 November 1762) was an Italian neoclassical poet.

== Biography ==
Spolverini was born in Verona into a wealthy, noble family. He studied literature at the Jesuit college of San Saverio in Bologna. Shortly after his return to Verona, he was forced by the death of his elder brother to suspend his studies in order to manage his family's affairs. In 1733 he married Savina Trissino, by whom he had twelve children. In 1761, three years after the publication of his main work, Spolverini became ill with epilepsy. He died in Verona on 24 November 1762.

== Works ==
Spolverini is chiefly remembered for his didactic poem in blank verse on the cultivation of rice. His interest in this subject arose from the fact that his family owned estates at Campeggio, near Lake Garda, part of which consisted of rice fields. The subject had not previously been treated in poetry, and the author made himself complete master of the technicalities of his theme. He devoted himself to the perusal of the great models of didactic poetry, especially Virgil's Georgics, and to writing verses himself in order to acquire the necessary flexibility of style. Spolverini wrote La coltivazione del riso at Malcesine (Garda) during the leisure of a period of public office. He had virtually completed it by 1746; but he continually revised the poem for more than a decade. It was first published in Verona in 1758, with plates engraved by the young Veronese artist Domenico Cunego after drawings by Francesco Lorenzi. Dedicated to Elisabeth Farnese, widow of Philip V of Spain, the poem deals in four books with the husbandry of rice and provides an elegant portrayal of an industrious rural community from the point of view of a cultured nobleman whose main interest lies in the wise management and improvement of his estates. The poem received universal acclaim and was printed in no less than 15 editions. The third edition (1796) includes an "Elogio" by Ippolito Pindemonte The poem was highly praised by Pindemonte, Bettinelli, Frugoni, Parini and Leopardi.

== Bibliography ==
- Pindemonte, Ippolito (1826). "Elogio del marchese Giovanbattista Spolverini". Elogi di letterati italiani. Vol. II. Verona: Tipografia Libanti. pp. 3–86.
- De Angelis, Luigi (1837). "Spolverini (Marchese Giambatista)". Biografia degli Italiani illustri nelle scienze, lettere ed arti del secolo XVIII, e de' contemporanei. Vol. 4. Venice: Alvisopoli. pp. 428–430.
- Cliffe, Francis Henry (1896). A Manual of Italian Literature. London: J. Macqueen. pp. 185–186.
- Barbarani, Emilio (1896). Sopra un manoscritto del marchese Giovanni Battista Spolverini. Verona: Stabilimento Tipografico Zannoni.
- Mistruzzi, Vittorio (1931). "Giambattista Spolverini. L'uomo". Atti e Memorie della Accademia di Agricoltura Scienze e Lettere di Verona. VII: 77–106.
- Natali, Giulio (1936). "SPOLVERINI, Giovan Battista". Enciclopedia Italiana. Rome: Istituto dell'Enciclopedia Italiana.
- Molteni, Monica (2012). "Con ogni tipografica accuratezza : note attorno al ritratto di Giovambattista Spolverini nell'edizione Giuliari della Coltivazione del riso" (PDF). Paratesto: Rivista internazionale. 9: 117–142.
