= Arusnates =

Ancient community of the Verona territory in Roman Italy

The Arusnates were a people of Cisalpine Gaul who inhabited the area of the modern Valpolicella region, around Fumane, northwest of Verona in Roman Italy. They are known almost exclusively through inscriptions.

Under Roman rule their territory formed a rural district, the pagus Arusnatium, which depended on the municipium of Verona while retaining some administrative and religious autonomy. The community is noted above all for its religious life, which combined Roman cults with a number of indigenous deities attested nowhere else. Attempts to assign the Arusnates an ethnic identity (Etruscan, Raetic, Venetic and Celtic) have remained inconclusive.

== Name ==
They are attested only epigraphically, in inscriptions from Fumane and San Giorgio di Valpolicella, in the territory of the pagus: pag(i) Arusnatium, Arusnatibus, and [pa]gi Arusnati[um].

Alexander Falileyev regards the name as probably not Celtic, while noting comparable Celtic toponyms and personal names built on a root aru-. Some scholars have connected it with Etruscan, analysing Arusna- as an ethnonym formed on a stem -rusna (cf. Rasenna, the Etruscans' name for themselves) or as a Latinised form recalling the legendary Arruns of Clusium. On this reading the Arusnates would have ascribed themselves a Chiusine origin. The form Arusnas is reported to occur already, in Raetic script, on inscribed antler trophies from a votive deposit at Serso di Pergine in the Valsugana dated between the 5th and 3rd centuries BC, which would place the name before the Roman period.

== Geography ==
The territory of the Arusnates lay in the hill country of the Valpolicella valley, between the eastern shore of Lake Garda and the Adige, to the northwest of Verona. It corresponds roughly to the modern district of the same name, centred on San Giorgio di Valpolicella, Marano di Valpolicella, San Pietro in Cariano and Fumane, where most of the relevant inscriptions and the principal sanctuary have been found. Fumane is generally taken to have been its administrative centre, and San Giorgio di Valpolicella its principal religious focus.

== History ==
=== Origins and identity ===
The Arusnates were a pre-Roman population whose origin is uncertain. Because they are absent from the literary record, their identity has been reconstructed from archaeology and, above all, from a large and often problematic body of inscriptions. Scholarship has connected them in turn with Raetic, Etruscan, Venetic and Celtic elements, without any one attribution prevailing: the onomastic material is mixed, combining names of Etruscan, Celtic and Latin type, while the indigenous theonyms admit of more than one comparison.

A Raetic background has been argued from the local priesthood of the pontifex sacrorum Raeticorum and from the ancient tradition that located Raeti and Euganei in the Verona area, while other scholars have stressed Etruscan connections in the name of the people and in several cult titles, speaking of a markedly "Etruscanising" character to the district. Lying on a route of passage between several peoples, the community is generally thought to have preserved a layering of these influences rather than belonging neatly to any one of them.

=== Roman period ===
Under Roman rule the territory was attached to Verona and organised as a pagus, a rural district of the city's territory. Most of the inscriptions from the pagus date from the 1st century BC to the 2nd century AD. A dedication to Jupiter Optimus Maximus, Juno and Minerva was set up by a serving soldier, C. Octavius Vitulus, recording the community's integration into the wider structures of the Roman army and administration.

The Valpolicella had been densely settled since prehistory, mostly in its western part. Under Rome, the pattern of occupation changed little, except for the appearance from the first century AD of villas combining residence with farming. San Giorgio stands out for its size and for the more than fifty inscriptions recovered there.

== Administration ==
The pagus Arusnatium enjoyed a degree of self-administration within the territory of Verona, expressed in particular by the closing formula l(ocus) d(atus) d(ecreto) d(ecurionum) on one of the sanctuary's bases. Whether the community had earlier been linked to Verona by adtributio is debated. The mechanism was rejected for the Arusnates by Umberto Laffi and by Lanfranco Franzoni, on the grounds that a pagus was by definition a rural community incorporated within a city's territory, whereas adtributae communities lay outside it and held an inferior legal status, and that the Valpolicella was not separated from the Veronese territory but crossed by the main road towards Tridentum. Hartmut Galsterer and Attilio Mastrocinque, by contrast, have argued for an earlier adtributio: on Galsterer's reconstruction the Arusnates were a populus attributed to Verona while the latter was still a Latin colony, and became a pagus of the Veronese territory only after Verona was promoted to a Roman municipium in 49 BC. The same debate has been linked to the presence within the community of two groups, indigenous inhabitants without citizenship and resident Roman citizens, a division some connect with the survival of local cults beside the Latin ones. Marked by dispersed settlement and assembling mainly for festivals and ceremonies, the district has been described as the relic of a small "theocratic state".

The most widely attested family of the pagus is the gens Octavia, whose members held its most prominent positions. The spread of the name has been explained as the result of a grant of citizenship by a Roman magistrate around the middle of the first century BC. The indigenous background of many local Octavii is shown by their cognomina.

Its officials included aediles, "quasi-magistrates" of the pagus with both administrative and religious duties. One of them appears in a Republican inscription from San Giorgio under the only partly Latinised name Prima Pittino Reidavius, taken as a link between the older indigenous elite and the new Roman authority; the name Reidavius has been connected with the Venetic goddess Reitia. An inscription from the sanctuary records four fanorum curatores, overseers of the sacred buildings, who carried out works ex pecunia fanatica, that is from the temple treasury.

== Religion ==
The religious life of the pagus was its most distinctive feature, combining Roman and imperial cults with a group of local deities attested only here, in what one scholar has called a "composite and original" pantheon.

=== Sanctuary of Minerva ===
The principal sanctuary was a temple of Minerva on the Monte Castelon, near Santa Maria di Minerbe at Marano di Valpolicella, an extra-urban fanum whose dedication survives in the local toponym Minerbe (Minerba). Its ruins were brought to light in 1836 by Giovanni Girolamo Orti Manara, and the inscriptions found there are largely known from early drawings and from the edition of Theodor Mommsen.

Excavations under Brunella Bruno between 2007 and 2010 showed that the imperial temple overlay earlier phases of cult. Beneath it lay a protohistoric votive area (ash, charcoal and finger-rings) datable between the 5th and 2nd centuries BC, comparable to the votive pyres documented in Venetic territory for the goddess Reitia, with whom Minerva, as an oracular and healing deity, shares affinities; a late-Republican temple followed, and the surviving Augustan building remained in use into late antiquity.

Among the texts from the sanctuary are several dedications to Minerva Augusta, some by people bearing Celtic gentilicia; a votive monument in the form of a foot was offered by L. Iariovidius Cato, of servile condition, whose name is a Celtic hapax. The goddess's healing role is shown by a base dedicated for the recovery of a sick son.

=== Votive deposit of San Giorgio ===
A second focus of cult lay at San Giorgio di Valpolicella, generally regarded as the religious centre of the pagus. In 1964, agricultural work in the locality of Cristo (Conca d'Oro), about a kilometre south of the village, uncovered stone-lined pits containing the remains of sacrificial fires; the Roman levels yielded a votive deposit of terracotta statuettes of Julio-Claudian date. The figures represent Latin deities, among them Fortuna, Minerva, Nemesis, Mercury, Attis and Priapus, together with worshippers and minor types; one throned figure has been interpreted as a syncretism of Nemesis and Fortuna, a power presiding over marriage and fertility.

=== Indigenous deities ===
A number of deities are attested under native, Latinised names that occur nowhere else, compared with varying confidence to the Etruscan, Raetic, Venetic and Celtic religious worlds. The god Cuslanus, from an altar at San Giorgio, has most often been derived from the Etruscan Culs, the equivalent of the Roman Janus, though Celtic, Raetic and Venetic origins have also been proposed. A second San Giorgio altar names Ihamnagalle and Sqnnagalle: read by Mommsen as one divine name and by others as two, these have frequently been taken as twin epithets of a goddess Galla, Sqna being compared with the Gaulish Sequana.

The goddess Lualda was first recognised in 1981 on a votive altar from Cavalo; Maria Silvia Bassignano, who published it, connected the new deity with the Roman agrarian goddess Lua, and a later reading Luae dae would identify the two outright. Leituria is taken to be an indigenous deity of Raeto-Etruscan background later associated with Diana. Udisna [Augusta], recorded on a reused slab from Fumane, is variously read as a structure or sacred enclosure, as a water-feature (the name linked to Greek hýdōr and so to the cult of the Nymphae attested at Fumane), or as a goddess identified with Vesta. Iuppiter Felvennis, from an altar at Mazzano, bears a cult title of Etruscan formation that is also attested as a Raetic place-name.

=== Roman and imperial cults ===
Alongside these, the ordinary cults of the Roman pantheon were practised, several probably overlying earlier local figures. The paired Sol and Luna at San Giorgio have been read as ancient local deities given Roman names. The cult of Saturn, a god of sowing thought to have been superimposed on a Raetic agrarian deity, is documented by a dedication of M. Flavius Festus and the flaminica Cusonia Maxima; Vesta is attested at Castelrotto and San Giorgio. Other dedications name the Genius of the pagus (the only such instance in Venetia), the mother-goddesses Iunones, the mining-god Sedatus at Domegliara, and the Persian Mithra (Deus invictus) in a destroyed mithraeum at Sant'Ambrogio.

The cult of Fortuna was particularly popular. Besides the statuettes from the votive deposit of San Giorgio (the largest single group there, at least eighteen pieces), the goddess is named on a small anonymous altar from the same village and on a more elegant one, dedicated by Vitullia Procula and set up on public ground (l(oco) d(ato) p(ublice)) in the territory of San Pietro in Cariano.

=== Priesthoods ===
The pagus had a developed body of priests, taken to reflect its autonomy in religious matters. The senior office was the pontifex sacrorum Raeticorum, held by a member of the gens Octavia and attested only here; it is generally understood as a priesthood created, after Verona became a municipium, to oversee the pre-Roman cults absorbed into the Latin pantheon. A purely local title, the manisnavius, is likewise unique to the Arusnates: a priest who states that he discharged as manisnavius a vow made as flamen has been taken to show the office ranking above the flaminate, and it has been tentatively connected with the cult of lunar deities and read as a pre-Roman, purificatory priesthood. The Roman flamen and flaminica are also well represented, with some nine flamines and five flaminicae named; the unusually high number of priestesses points to the prominence of women in the cultic life of the district, as with Octavia Magna, styled flaminica pagi Arusnatium at Fumane. Other inscriptions record the fanorum curatores who maintained the sanctuaries and the seviri and seviri Augustales of the imperial cult.

== Economy ==
The Valpolicella was known in antiquity for its grapes and wines, the so-called Raetica vina, praised over several centuries by Latin authors for their quality. The territory was integrated into a wider trade in wine: a funerary inscription from Passau in Bavaria records P. Tenatius Essimnus, a wine merchant resident at Tridentum, whose gentilicium Tenatius is otherwise characteristic of Verona and specifically of the Arusnate district, and a lost bronze tablet from the Adige at Verona, naming negotiatores vinorum pagi, has likewise been referred to the community. On this evidence the Valpolicella has been seen as a natural point of contact between the Po Valley and the sub-Alpine and trans-Alpine regions, through which wine could be gathered, blended and exported. The long-lived villa at Ambrosan near San Pietro in Cariano, occupied from the first to the fifth or sixth century AD, included rooms for pressing and drying grapes, and the road up the Adige valley that carried such traffic towards the trans-Alpine provinces, laid out under Drusus and rebuilt by Claudius, crossed the territory of the pagus and remained in repair into the fourth century.

Quarrying and stone-working were a further long-standing activity of the area, which supplied the red ammonitic limestone ("Verona marble") and the local white and pinkish limestone used for most of the monuments, from quarries at Domegliara, Sant'Ambrogio, San Giorgio and Volargne.
