= Giuseppe Torelli (mathematician) =

Italian mathematician and philologist (1721–1781)

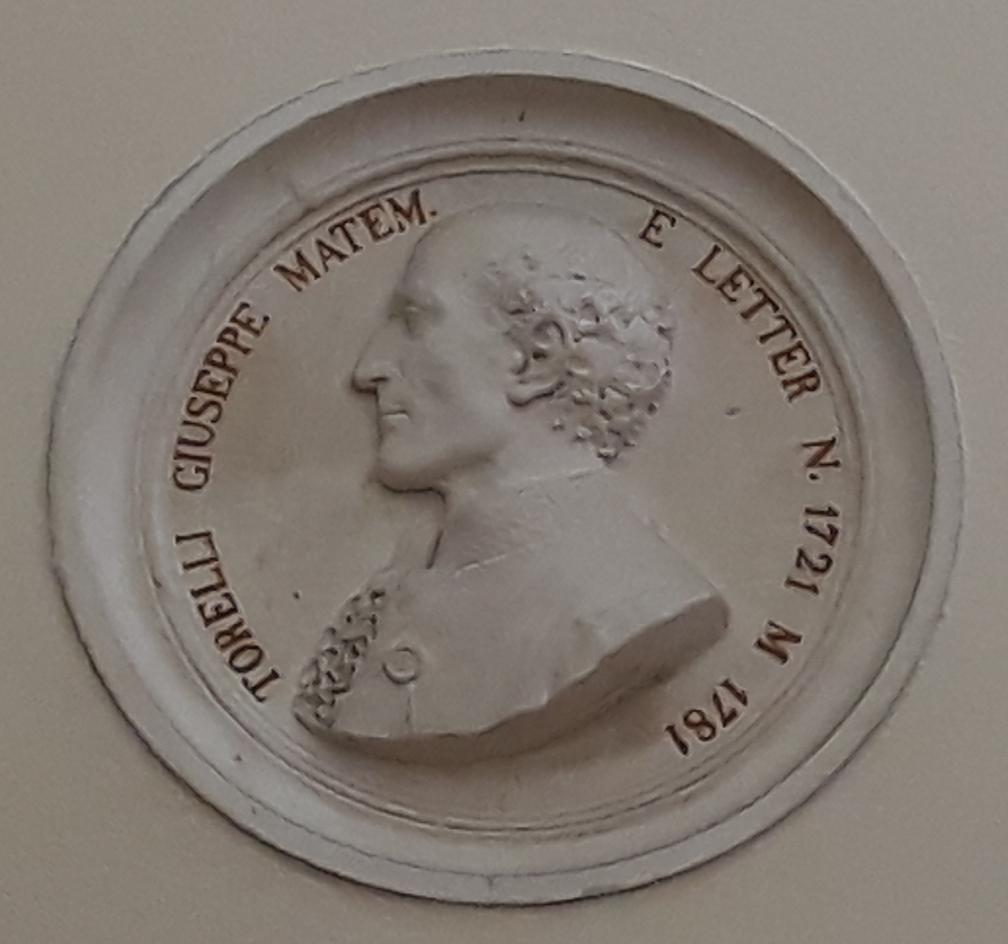
- Born: 3 November 1721; Verona, Republic of Venice
- Died: 18 August 1781 (aged 59); Verona, Republic of Venice
- Resting place: Sant'Anastasia, Verona
- Education: University of Padua
- Occupations: Mathematician and philologist

Giuseppe Torelli (3 November 1721 – 18 August 1781) was an Italian mathematician and philologist. He is best known for his edition of Archimedes' works, published in Oxford in 1792.

== Biography ==
Born in Verona on 3 November 1721, Torelli graduated in law from the University of Padua in 1744. After completing his studies, he dedicated himself to scholarly pursuits in Verona, having inherited a substantial fortune. His interests spanned mathematics, history, philosophy, art, and classics. In addition to Greek and Latin, he also mastered Hebrew, English, French and Spanish.

After decades of preparation, he produced a new edition of Archimedes' works featuring both the original Greek text and a Latin translation. The edition included the classical mathematical commentaries of Eutocius of Ascalon, a late ancient commentator of Archimedes and Apollonius. The volume was published posthumously in 1792 in Oxford by the Clarendon Press under the superintendence of Scottish astronomer Abraham Robertson. It also contains Torelli's commentary on the tract relating to floating bodies and a biography of Torelli written by his friend Clemente Sibiliato. Torelli's edition served as the standard, authoritative text for the study of Archimedes for over a century before being superseded by J.L. Heiberg's critical edition.

Torelli translated Aesop's Fables into Latin and Theocritus' works, Plautus' Pseudolus and Thomas Gray’s Elegy Written in a Country Churchyard into Italian verse.

Torelli never married. As a prominent Italian scholar, he served as a point of contact for foreign visitors and diplomats. He maintained an extensive correspondence network with scholars throughout Europe, particularly in the British academic world. Among his English friends were Charles Stanhope, David Murray and John Strange. Torelli died in Verona on 18 August 1781, aged 59.

== Works ==
Title page of Torelli's edition of Archimedes

- Somnium Jacobi Pindemontii, Padua, 1743.
- Animadversiones in hebraïcum Exodi librum et in græcam LXX interpretationem, Verona, 1774.
- De principe gulæ incommodo, ejusque remedio, Verona, 1744.
- Traduzioni poetiche, o sia tentativi per ben tradurre in verso, Verona, 1746.
- De rota sub aquis circumacta, Verona, 1747.
- Traduzione de’ due primi libri dell'Eneide, Verona, 1749.
- Lettera al marchese Maffei, sopra un’antica iscrizione greca, Verona, 1750.
- Scala de’ meriti a capo d’anno, trattato geometrico, Verona, 1751.
- De nihilo geometrico libri II, Verona, 1758.
- Geometrica, Verona, 1769.
- Lettera sulla denominazione del corrente anno, Verona, 1760.
- Lettera intorno a due passi del Purgatorio di Dante, Verona, 1760.
- Il Pseudolo, commedia di Plauto, con alcuni idilli di Teocrito e di Mosco, Florence, 1765.
- Inno a Maria Vergine, Verona, 1766.
- Lettera a miladi Vaing-Reit, Verona, 1767.
- De probabili vita morumque regula, Verona, 1774.
- Demonstratio antiqui theorematis de motuum commixtione, Verona, 1774.
- Elegia sopra un cimitero campestre, Verona, 1776.
- Poemetto di Catullo intorno alle nozze di Teti e di Peleo, Verona, 1781.
- Lettera sopra Dante contro Voltaire, Verona, 1781.
- Lettera all'autore delle Virgiliane (Bettinelli), di P. Paladinozzo di Montegrilti (Torelli), Verona, 1787.
- Elementorum prospectives libri II, Verona, 1788.
- Archimedis quæ supersunt omnia cum Eutocii Ascalonitæ commentariis, cum nova versione Latina, etc., Oxford, 1792.
- Poesie, con alcune prose latine, Verona, 1795.

== Bibliography ==
- Ciancio, Luca (2019). "TORELLI, Giuseppe". Dizionario Biografico degli Italiani (in Italian). Vol. 96: Toja–Trivelli. Rome: Istituto dell'Enciclopedia Italiana. ISBN 978-88-12-00032-6.
- "Torelli, Joseph". Alexander Chalmers' General Biographical Dictionary. Vol. 29. London: J. Nichols and Son. 1812. p. 465.
