= 2012 U.S. Men's Clay Court Championships – Singles =

Singles
- 2012 U.S. Men's Clay Court Championships

Final
- Champion: (Argentina) Juan Mónaco
- Runner-up: (United States) John Isner
- Score: 6–2, 3–6, 6–3

Details
- Draw: 28
- Seeds: 8

Events
Singles	Doubles
- U.S. Men's Clay Court Championships

Ryan Sweeting was the defending champion but lost to John Isner in the quarterfinals. Isner lost in the final to Juan Mónaco, 2–6, 6–3, 3–6.

== Seeds ==
The top four seeds receive a bye into the second round.

1. (United States) Mardy Fish (second round)
2. (United States) John Isner (final)
3. (Spain) Feliciano López (semifinals)
4. (Argentina) Juan Mónaco (champion)
5. (South Africa) Kevin Anderson (quarterfinals)
6. (Argentina) Carlos Berlocq (quarterfinals, retired)
7. (Russia) Alex Bogomolov Jr. (first round)
8. (Croatia) Ivo Karlović (first round)

== Draw ==
Key

- Q = Qualifier
- WC = Wild card
- LL = Lucky loser
- Alt = Alternate
- ITF = ITF entry
- PR = Protected ranking
- SR = Special ranking
- SE = Special exempt
- JE = Junior exempt
- JR = Junior Accelerator Programme entrant
- CO = College Accelerator Programme entrant
- NG = Next Gen Accelerator Program entrant
- w/o = Walkover
- r = Retired
- d = Defaulted

=== Finals ===
Semifinals
Q	(United States) Michael Russell	7	1	4
4/WC	(Argentina) Juan Mónaco	5	6	6
3/WC	(Spain) Feliciano López	7^{7}	6^{4}	3
2	(United States) John Isner	6^{5}	7^{7}	6

Final
4/WC	(Argentina) Juan Mónaco	6	3	6
2	(United States) John Isner	2	6	3

=== Top half ===
First round
Q	(United States) M Russell	2	7	6
(Spain) D Gimeno Traver	6	5	1
(Belgium) X Malisse	4	2
(Russia) I Kunitsyn	6	6
(United States) R Harrison	4	6	6
7	(Russia) A Bogomolov Jr.	6	3	4
(Japan) T Ito	6	7
Q	(Japan) G Soeda	4	5
(France) É Prodon	1	4
(United States) S Querrey	6	6
(Brazil) J Souza	3	4
5/WC	(South Africa) K Anderson	6	6

Second round
1	(United States) M Fish	3	1
Q	(United States) M Russell	6	6
(Russia) I Kunitsyn	2	4
(United States) R Harrison	6	6
4/WC	(Argentina) J Mónaco	6	6
(Japan) T Ito	3	3
(United States) S Querrey	6^{3}	6	6^{2}
5/WC	(South Africa) K Anderson	7^{7}	3	7^{7}

Quarterfinals
Q	(United States) M Russell	6	5	6
(United States) R Harrison	1	7	3
4/WC	(Argentina) J Mónaco	7^{7}	7
5/WC	(South Africa) K Anderson	6^{4}	5

Semifinals
Q	(United States) M Russell	7	1	4
4/WC	(Argentina) J Mónaco	5	6	6

=== Bottom half ===
First round
6	(Argentina) C Berlocq	6	2	6
(United States) J Blake	4	6	1
(Germany) B Phau	6	3
(Argentina) D Junqueira	1	0^{r}
(Italy) P Lorenzi	6^{3}	6	6
(United States) W Odesnik	7^{7}	2	3
8	(Croatia) I Karlović	6^{5}	6	3
(United States) B Reynolds	7^{7}	2	6
(United States) R Sweeting	6	7^{8}
Q	(Brazil) R Mello	3	6^{6}
Q	(Argentina) H Zeballos	6	6
(Romania) A Ungur	3	3

Second round
6	(Argentina) C Berlocq	6	6
(Germany) B Phau	1	0
(Italy) P Lorenzi	4	6^{4}
3/WC	(Spain) F López	6	7^{7}
(United States) B Reynolds	3	2
(United States) R Sweeting	6	6
Q	(Argentina) H Zeballos	7^{7}	4	2
2	(United States) J Isner	6^{3}	6	6

Quarterfinals
6	(Argentina) C Berlocq	4	2^{r}
3/WC	(Spain) F López	6	2
(United States) R Sweeting	6^{1}	6^{4}
2	(United States) J Isner	7^{7}	7^{7}

Semifinals
3/WC	(Spain) F López	7^{7}	6^{4}	3
2	(United States) J Isner	6^{5}	7^{7}	6

== Qualifying ==
=== Seeds ===
1. (Japan) Go Soeda (qualified)
2. (Argentina) Horacio Zeballos (qualified)
3. (Brazil) Ricardo Mello (qualified)
4. (United States) Michael Russell (qualified)
5. (Germany) Tommy Haas (qualifying competition, withdrew due to a right knee injury)
6. (Russia) Teymuraz Gabashvili (second round)
7. (Japan) Yūichi Sugita (second round)
8. (United States) Michael Yani (second round, retired)

=== Qualifiers ===
1. (Japan) Go Soeda
2. (Argentina) Horacio Zeballos
3. (Brazil) Ricardo Mello
4. (United States) Michael Russell

=== Draw ===
==== First qualifier ====
First round				Second round				Qualifying competition
				1	(Japan) Go Soeda	6	6
(United States) Alex Kuznetsov	7^{7}	6^{1}	4		(United States) Robby Ginepri	4	4
(United States) Robby Ginepri	6^{4}	7^{7}	6					1	(Japan) Go Soeda	w/o
(United States) Chris Wettengel	6	6						5	(Germany) Tommy Haas
(United States) James Cerretani	0	4			(United States) Chris Wettengel	3	3
				5	(Germany) Tommy Haas	6	6

==== Second qualifier ====
First round
(United States) Harry Fowler	6^{9}	3
WC	(United States) Nicholas Naumann	7^{11}	6
(United States) Dennis Lajola	6^{2}	4
(Czech Republic) Jan Hernych	7^{7}	6
(Germany) Frank Moser	4	1
8	(United States) Michael Yani	6	6

Second round
2	(Argentina) Horacio Zeballos	6	6
WC	(United States) Nicholas Naumann	3	1
(Czech Republic) Jan Hernych	7^{7}	1
8	(United States) Michael Yani	6^{5}	0^{r}

Qualifying competition
2	(Argentina) Horacio Zeballos	6^{3}	6	7
(Czech Republic) Jan Hernych	7^{7}	3	5

==== Third qualifier ====
First round			Second round					Qualifying competition
			3	(Brazil) Ricardo Mello	7	6
(United States) Joshua Zavala	1	4		(Canada) Peter Polansky	5	3
(Canada) Peter Polansky	6	6						3	(Brazil) Ricardo Mello	6	6
(Romania) Cătălin Gârd	6	6							(Romania) Cătălin Gârd	3	3
(United States) Scott Lipsky	0	4		(Romania) Cătălin Gârd	7	4	6
			6	(Russia) Teymuraz Gabashvili	5	6	2

==== Fourth qualifier ====
First round				Second round				Qualifying competition
				4	(United States) Michael Russell	6	7
(Hungary) Dénes Lukács	7^{7}	2	0		(Hungary) Dénes Lukács	4	5
(United States) Amrit Narasimhan	6^{4}	6	0^{r}					4	(United States) Michael Russell	6	6
(Germany) Mischa Zverev	6	4	0^{r}						(United States) Daniel Kosakowski	4	1
(United States) Daniel Kosakowski	3	6	3		(United States) Daniel Kosakowski	7^{7}	6
				7	(Japan) Yūichi Sugita	6^{4}	4
