= 2012 U.S. Men's Clay Court Championships =

- Date: April 9–15
- Edition: 44th
- Category: World Tour 250
- Draw: 32S / 16D
- Prize money: $442,500
- Surface: Clay / outdoor
- Location: Houston, TX, United States
- Venue: River Oaks Country Club

Champions

Singles
- (Argentina) Juan Mónaco

Doubles
- (United States) James Blake / (United States) Sam Querrey
- U.S. Men's Clay Court Championships

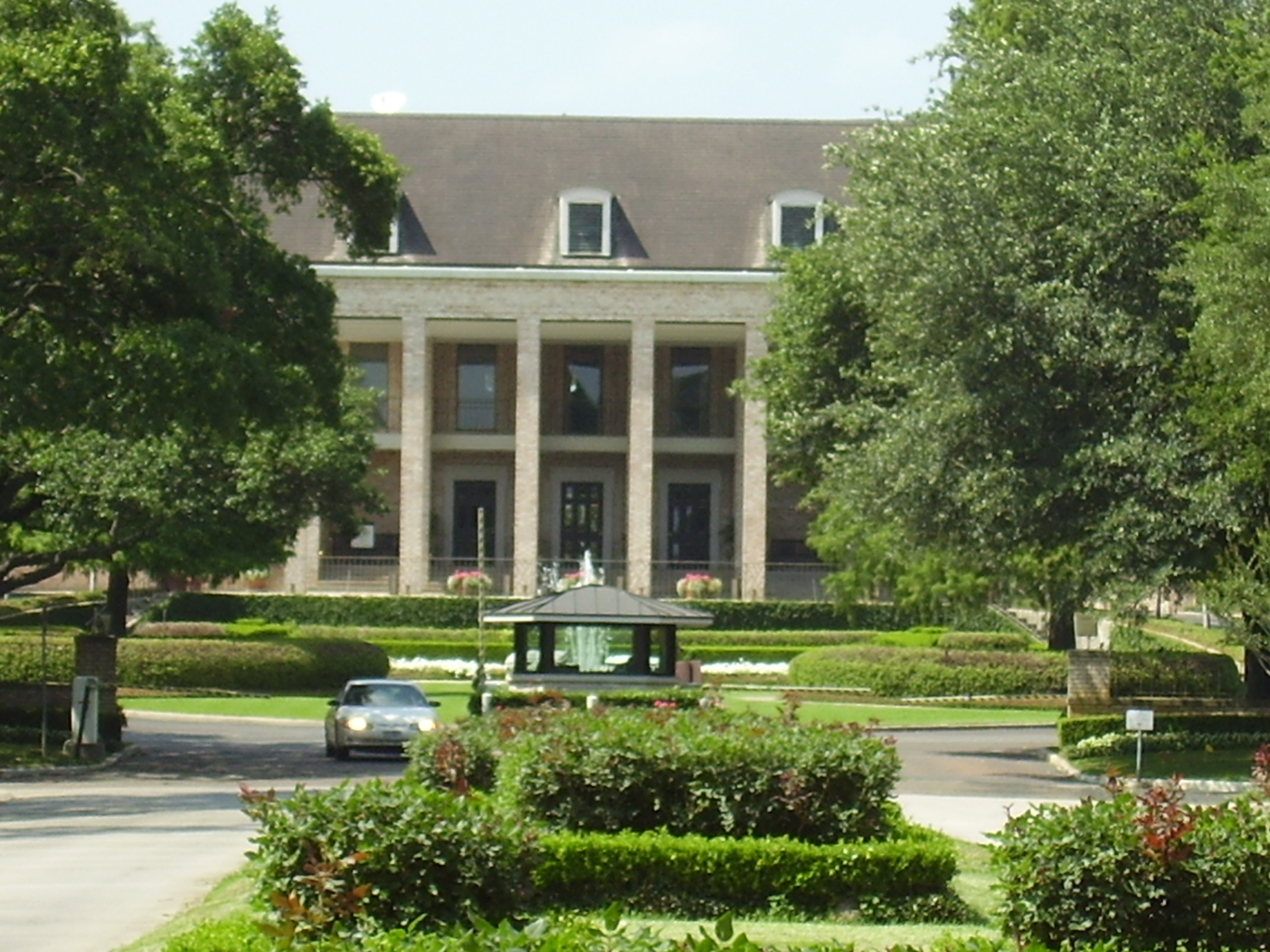
River Oaks Country Club

The 2012 U.S. Men's Clay Court Championships was a tennis tournament played on outdoor clay courts. It was the 44th edition of the U.S. Men's Clay Court Championships, and was an ATP World Tour 250 event. It took place at River Oaks Country Club in Houston, Texas, United States, from April 9 through April 15, 2012.

== Finals ==
=== Singles ===
(Argentina) Juan Mónaco defeated (United States) John Isner 6–2, 3–6, 6–3

- It was Monaco's 2nd singles title of the year and 5th of his career.

=== Doubles ===
(United States) James Blake / (United States) Sam Querrey defeated (Philippines) Treat Conrad Huey / (United Kingdom) Dominic Inglot, 7–6^{(16–14)}, 6–4

== Singles main draw entrants ==
=== Seeds ===
| Country | Player | Rank^{1} | Seed |
|---|---|---|---|
| USA | Mardy Fish | 9 | 1 |
| USA | John Isner | 11 | 2 |
| ESP | Feliciano López | 15 | 3 |
| ARG | Juan Mónaco | 16 | 4 |
| RSA | Kevin Anderson | 33 | 5 |
| ARG | Carlos Berlocq | 37 | 6 |
| RUS | Alex Bogomolov, Jr. | 41 | 7 |
| CRO | Ivo Karlović | 52 | 8 |

- Rankings and seedings are as of April 2, 2012

=== Other entrants ===
The following players received wildcards into the main draw:

- (South Africa) Kevin Anderson
- (Spain) Feliciano López
- (Argentina) Juan Mónaco

The following players received entry via qualifying:

- (Brazil) Ricardo Mello
- (United States) Michael Russell
- (Japan) Go Soeda
- (Argentina) Horacio Zeballos

=== Retirements ===
- (Argentina) Carlos Berlocq (lower leg injury)
- (Argentina) Diego Junqueira (hip injury)

== Doubles main draw entrants ==
=== Seeds ===
| Country | Player | Country | Player | Rank^{1} | Seed |
|---|---|---|---|---|---|
| RUS | Alex Bogomolov, Jr. | USA | Scott Lipsky | 100 | 1 |
| BAH | Mark Knowles | BEL | Xavier Malisse | 115 | 2 |
| GER | Michael Kohlmann | GER | Alexander Waske | 138 | 3 |
| SWE | Johan Brunström | BEL | Dick Norman | 140 | 4 |

- Rankings are as of April 2, 2012

=== Other entrants ===
The following pairs received wildcards into the doubles main draw:

- (United States) Robert Kendrick / (United States) Ryan Sweeting
- (United States) Bobby Reynolds / (United States) Michael Russell
