= 2007 Davis Cup =

2007 edition of the Davis Cup

Details
- Duration: 6 February – 2 December 2007
- Edition: 96th

Champion
- Winning nation: United States

The 2007 Davis Cup was the 96th edition of the Davis Cup, a national teams competition in men's tennis. Sixteen teams participated in the World Group and 123 took part in different regional groups. The final took place 30 November - 2 December at the Memorial Coliseum in Portland, Oregon, United States, with the United States defeating Russia 4-1 for their 32nd title.

Aruba and Montenegro made their first appearances in the tournament.

== World Group ==
Participating Teams
Argentina	Australia	Austria	Belarus
Belgium	Chile	Croatia	Czech Republic
France	Germany	Romania	Russia
Spain	Sweden	Switzerland	United States

=== Draw ===
First round 9-11 February
La Serena, Chile (clay)
1	Russia	3
Chile	2
Clermont-Ferrand, France (indoor hard)
7	France	4
Romania	1
Krefeld, Germany (indoor hard)
3	Croatia	2
Germany	3
Liège, Belgium (indoor clay)
5	Australia	2
Belgium	3
Ostrava, Czech Republic (indoor clay)
Czech Republic	1
6	United States	4
Geneva, Switzerland (indoor carpet)
Switzerland	2
4	Spain	3
Minsk, Belarus (indoor hard)
Sweden	3
8	Belarus	2
Linz, Austria (indoor carpet)
Austria	1
2	Argentina	4

Quarterfinals; 6-8 April
Moscow, Russia (indoor clay)
1	Russia	3
7	France	2
Ostend, Belgium (indoor clay)
Germany	3
Belgium	2
Winston-Salem, United States (indoor hard)
6	United States	4
4	Spain	1
Gothenburg, Sweden (indoor carpet)
Sweden	4
2	Argentina	1

Semifinals; 21-23 September
Moscow, Russia (indoor clay)
1	Russia	3
Germany	2
Gothenburg, Sweden (indoor carpet)
6	United States	4
Sweden	1

Final; 30 November - 2 December
Portland, United States (indoor hard)
1	Russia	1
6	United States	4

First round losers play in World Group play-offs.

=== Final ===
United States
4
Memorial Coliseum, Portland, United States
30 November - 2 December 2007
Hard (i)

Russia
1

			1	2	3	4	5
1	(United States) (Russia)	Andy Roddick; Dmitry Tursunov	6; 4	6; 4	6; 2
2	(United States) (Russia)	James Blake; Mikhail Youzhny	6; 3	7^{7} 6^{4}	6^{3} 7^{7}	7^{7} 6^{3}
3	(United States) (Russia)	Bob Bryan / Mike Bryan; Igor Andreev / Nikolay Davydenko	7^{7} 6^{4}	6; 4	6; 2
4	(United States) (Russia)	Bob Bryan; Igor Andreev	3; 6	6^{4} 7^{7}
5	(United States) (Russia)	James Blake; Dmitry Tursunov	1; 6	6; 3	7; 5

== World Group play-offs ==
- Date: 21–23 September

The 8 losing teams in the World Group first round ties, and 8 winners of the Group I second round ties entered the draw for the World Group Playoffs. 8 seeded teams, based on the latest Davis Cup ranking, were drawn against 8 unseeded teams.

Home team	Score	Visiting team	Location	Venue	Door	Surface
Serbia	4–1	Australia	Belgrade	Beogradska Arena	Indoor	Clay
Austria	4–1	Brazil	Innsbruck	Olympiaworld Innsbruck	Indoor	Carpet
Peru	4–1	Belarus	Lima	Rinconada Country Club	Outdoor	Clay
Israel^{1}	3–2	Chile	Ramat HaSharon	Canada Stadium	Outdoor	Hard
Great Britain	4–1	Croatia	Wimbledon, London	All England Lawn Tennis Club	Outdoor	Grass
Czech Republic	3–2	Switzerland	Prague	Sazka Arena	Indoor	Hard
Japan	2–3	Romania	Osaka	Namihaya Dome	Indoor	Carpet
Slovakia	2–3	South Korea	Bratislava	Sibamac Arena	Indoor	Clay

- Austria, Czech Republic, and Romania will remain in the World Group in 2008.
- Great Britain, Israel, Peru, Serbia and South Korea are promoted to the World Group in 2008.
- Brazil, Japan and Slovakia will remain in Zonal Group I in 2008.
- Australia, Belarus, Chile, Croatia and Switzerland are relegated to Zonal Group I in 2008.

^{1} Took place on September 20, 21 and 23, due to Yom Kippur taking place on the 22nd.

== Americas Zone ==
=== Group I ===
Second Round Play-offs
Valencia, Venezuela (hard)
Venezuela	1
Colombia	4

First Round Play-offs
Metepec, Mexico (hard)
S	Mexico	5
Venezuela	0
Colombia
bye

First Round
S	Mexico
bye
Asia, Peru (clay)
Venezuela	2
Peru	3
Calgary, Canada (indoor carpet)
Colombia	0
Canada	5
bye
S	Brazil

Second Round
Asia, Peru (clay)
S	Mexico	2
Peru	3
Florianópolis, Brazil (clay)
Canada	1
S	Brazil	3

- Venezuela relegated to Group II in 2008.
- Peru and Brazil advance to World Group Play-off.

=== Group II ===
The Americas Zone was one of the three zones of the regional Davis Cup competition in 2007.

In the Americas Zone there were four different tiers, called groups, in which teams compete against each other to advance to the upper tier. Winners in Group II advanced to the Americas Zone Group I. Teams who lost their respective ties competed in the relegation play-offs, with winning teams remaining in Group II, whereas teams who lost their play-offs were relegated to the Americas Zone Group III in 2008.

== Participating nations ==
- Cuba
- Dominican Republic
- Ecuador
- El Salvador
- Jamaica
- Netherlands Antilles
- Paraguay
- Uruguay

=== Draw ===
Play-offs
Kingston, Jamaica (hard)
Netherlands Antilles	5
Jamaica	0
Santa Tecla, El Salvador (clay)
El Salvador	4
Cuba	1

First Round
Guayaquil, Ecuador (clay)
1	Ecuador	5
Netherlands Antilles	0
Punta del Este, Uruguay (clay)
4	Uruguay	5
Jamaica	0
Santo Domingo, Dominican Rep. (hard)
El Salvador	1
3	Dominican Republic	4
Asunción, Paraguay (clay)
Cuba	0
2	Paraguay	5

Second Round
Punta del Este, Uruguay (clay)
1	Ecuador	0
4	Uruguay	5
Lambaré, Paraguay (clay)
3	Dominican Republic	1
2	Paraguay	4

Third Round
Asunción, Paraguay (clay)
4	Uruguay	3
2	Paraguay	0

- Jamaica and Cuba relegated to Group III in 2008.
- Uruguay promoted to Group I in 2008.

== First round ==
=== Ecuador vs. Netherlands Antilles ===
Ecuador
5
Francisco Seguro Cano, Guayaquil Tenis Club, Guayaquil, Ecuador
9–11 February 2007
Clay

Netherlands Antilles
0

			1	2	3	4	5
1	(Ecuador) (Netherlands Antilles)	Carlos Avellán; Rasid Winklaar	6; 2	6; 2	6; 0
2	(Ecuador) (Netherlands Antilles)	Julio César Campozano; Alexander Blom	6; 4	6; 1	6; 2
3	(Ecuador) (Netherlands Antilles)	Carlos Avellán / Julio César Campozano; Raoul Behr / Nick Van Rosberg	6; 1	6; 0	6; 2
4	(Ecuador) (Netherlands Antilles)	Jean-Michel Durango; Nick Van Rosberg	6; 3	6; 0
5	(Ecuador) (Netherlands Antilles)	Julio César Campozano; Rasid Winklaar	6; 4	7; 5

=== Uruguay vs. Jamaica ===
Uruguay
5
Cantegril Country Club, Punta del Este, Uruguay
9–11 February 2007
Clay

Jamaica
0

			1	2	3	4	5
1	(Uruguay) (Jamaica)	Marcel Felder; Damion Johnson	6; 0	6; 0	6; 1
2	(Uruguay) (Jamaica)	Pablo Cuevas; Eldad Campbell	6; 1	6; 1	6; 2
3	(Uruguay) (Jamaica)	Pablo Cuevas / Marcel Felder; Elvis Henry / Jermaine Smith	6; 2	6; 3	6; 3
4	(Uruguay) (Jamaica)	Martín Vilarrubí; Damion Johnson	6; 1	6; 4
5	(Uruguay) (Jamaica)	Federico Sansonetti; Eldad Campbell	6; 0	6; 0

=== Dominican Republic vs. El Salvador ===
Dominican Republic
4
Pabellon de Tenis del Aprque del Este, Santo Domingo, Dominican Republic
9–11 February 2007
Hard

El Salvador
1

			1	2	3	4	5
1	(Dominican Republic) (El Salvador)	Henry Estrella; Rafael Arévalo	6^{4} 7^{7}	1; 6	6^{4} 7^{7}
2	(Dominican Republic) (El Salvador)	Víctor Estrella Burgos; Marcelo Arévalo	6; 4	6; 3	6; 1
3	(Dominican Republic) (El Salvador)	Henry Estrella / Víctor Estrella Burgos; Marcelo Arévalo / Rafael Arévalo	7^{7} 6^{0}	7^{7} 6^{5}	7^{7} 6^{2}
4	(Dominican Republic) (El Salvador)	Víctor Estrella Burgos; Rafael Arévalo	7; 5	4; 1				retired
5	(Dominican Republic) (El Salvador)	José Hernández-Fernández; Benito José Suriano	6; 1	6; 3

=== Paraguay vs. Cuba ===
Paraguay
5
Yacht y Golf Club Paraguayo, Asunción, Paraguay
9–11 February 2007
Clay

Cuba
0

			1	2	3	4	5
1	(Paraguay) (Cuba)	Gustavo Ramírez; Edgar Hernandez-Perez	6; 3	7; 5	1; 6	6; 0
2	(Paraguay) (Cuba)	Ramón Delgado; Favel-Antonio Freyre-Perdomo	6; 1	6; 0	6; 1
3	(Paraguay) (Cuba)	Emilio Báez Brítez / Ramón Delgado; Luis-Javier Cuellar-Contreras / Sandor Martínez	7^{7} 6^{3}	7^{7} 6^{3}	6; 1
4	(Paraguay) (Cuba)	Juan Carlos Ramírez; Edgar Hernandez-Perez	7; 5	7^{7} 6^{5}
5	(Paraguay) (Cuba)	Gustavo Ramírez; Favel-Antonio Freyre-Perdomo	7; 5	6; 4

== Second round ==
=== Uruguay vs. Ecuador ===
Uruguay
5
Cantegril Country Club, Punta del Este, Uruguay
6–8 April 2007
Clay

Ecuador
0

			1	2	3	4	5
1	(Uruguay) (Ecuador)	Marcel Felder; Carlos Avellán	6; 3	6; 1	6; 3
2	(Uruguay) (Ecuador)	Pablo Cuevas; Julio César Campozano	7^{13} 6^{11}	6; 3	6; 3
3	(Uruguay) (Ecuador)	Marcel Felder / Martín Vilarrubí; Carlos Avellán / Jean-Michel Durango	5; 7	6; 3	7^{7} 6^{2}	6; 0
4	(Uruguay) (Ecuador)	Pablo Cuevas; Jean-Michel Durango	6; 1	6; 2
5	(Uruguay) (Ecuador)	Federico Sansonetti; Patricio Alvarado	6; 3	6; 4

=== Paraguay vs. Dominican Republic ===
Paraguay
4
Yacht y Golf Club Paraguayo, Lambaré, Paraguay
6–8 April 2007
Clay

Dominican Republic
1

			1	2	3	4	5
1	(Paraguay) (Dominican Republic)	Ramón Delgado; Henry Estrella	6; 0	6; 0	6; 1
2	(Paraguay) (Dominican Republic)	Gustavo Ramírez; Víctor Estrella Burgos	4; 6	3; 6	6; 1	7; 5	5; 7
3	(Paraguay) (Dominican Republic)	Ramón Delgado / Francisco Rodríguez; Henry Estrella / Víctor Estrella Burgos	6; 4	4; 6	6; 1	3; 2		retired
4	(Paraguay) (Dominican Republic)	Ramón Delgado; Luis Delgado	6; 0	6; 0	6; 0
5	(Paraguay) (Dominican Republic)	Emilio Báez Brítez; Henry Estrella	6; 0	6; 2

== Relegation play-offs ==
=== Jamaica vs. Netherlands Antilles ===
Jamaica
0
The Eric Ball Tennis Centre, Kingston, Jamaica
6–8 April 2007
Hard

Netherlands Antilles
5

			1	2	3	4	5
1	(Jamaica) (Netherlands Antilles)	Damion Johnson; Jean-Julien Rojer	1; 6	2; 6	2; 6
2	(Jamaica) (Netherlands Antilles)	Ryan Russell; Rasid Winklaar	6; 3	6^{3} 7^{7}	2; 6	2; 6
3	(Jamaica) (Netherlands Antilles)	Damion Johnson / Ryan Russell; Raoul Behr / Jean-Julien Rojer	6^{7} 7^{9}	6^{5} 7^{7}	6^{5} 7^{7}
4	(Jamaica) (Netherlands Antilles)	Eldad Campbell; Nick Van Rosberg	6; 4	1; 6	4; 6
5	(Jamaica) (Netherlands Antilles)	Damion Johnson; Rasid Winklaar	4; 6	6; 3	3; 4			retired

=== El Salvador vs. Cuba ===
El Salvador
4
Maya Country Club, Santa Tecla, El Salvador
6–8 April 2007
Clay

Cuba
1

			1	2	3	4	5
1	(El Salvador) (Cuba)	Rafael Arévalo; Luis-Javier Cuellar-Contreras	6; 1	5; 7	6; 4	6; 3
2	(El Salvador) (Cuba)	Marcelo Arévalo; Edgar Hernandez-Perez	4; 6	6; 3	4; 6	0; 2		retired
3	(El Salvador) (Cuba)	Marcelo Arévalo / Rafael Arévalo; Luis-Javier Cuellar-Contreras / Sandor Martínez	6; 4	7; 5	6; 1
4	(El Salvador) (Cuba)	Rafael Arévalo; Edgar Hernandez-Perez	6; 0	6; 3	6; 1
5	(El Salvador) (Cuba)	Benito José Suriano; Sandor Martínez	6; 4	2; 6	7^{7} 6^{2}

== Third round ==
=== Paraguay vs. Uruguay ===
Paraguay
0
Yacht y Golf Club Paraguayo, Asunción, Paraguay
21–23 September 2007
Clay

Uruguay
3

			1	2	3	4	5
1	(Paraguay) (Uruguay)	Gustavo Ramírez; Marcel Felder	1; 6	1; 6	2; 6
2	(Paraguay) (Uruguay)	Emilio Báez Brítez; Pablo Cuevas	0; 6	2; 6	2; 6
3	(Paraguay) (Uruguay)	Emilio Báez Brítez / Juan-Enrique Crosa; Pablo Cuevas / Marcel Felder	2; 6	4; 6	2; 6
4	(Paraguay) (Uruguay)	Gustavo Ramírez; Federico Sansonetti						not played
5	(Paraguay) (Uruguay)	Enzo Pigola; Marcel Felder						not played

=== Group III ===
Venue: Federación Nacional de Tenis de Guatemala, Guatemala City, Guatemala (hard)
Date: 20–24 June

	Pool A	BAH	GUA	BAR	HAI
1	Bahamas (3–0)		3–0	2–1	3–0
2	Guatemala (2–1)	0–3		3–0	3–0
3	Barbados (1–2)	1–2	0–3		3–0
4	Haiti (0–3)	0–3	0–3	0–3	

	Pool B	BOL	PUR	PAN	CRC
1	Bolivia (3–0)		3–0	3–0	3–0
2	Puerto Rico (2–1)	0–3		3–0	2–1
3	Panama (1–2)	0–3	0–3		2–1
4	Costa Rica (0–3)	0–3	1–2	1–2	

Top two teams advance to 1st–4th Play-off, bottom two teams advance to 5th–8th Play-off. Scores in italics carried over from pools.

	1st–4th Play-off	BAH	BOL	PUR	GUA
1	Bahamas (3–0)		2–1	2–1	3–0
2	Bolivia (2–1)	1–2		3–0	2–0
3	Puerto Rico (1–2)	1–2	0–3		2–1
4	Guatemala (0–3)	0–3	0–2	1–2	

	5th–8th Play-off	BAR	PAN	HAI	CRC
1	Barbados (2–1)		3–0	3–0	0–3
2	Panama (2–1)	0–3		2–0	2–1
3	Haiti (1–2)	0–3	0–2		2–1
4	Costa Rica (1–2)	3–0	1–2	1–2	

- Bahamas and Bolivia promoted to Group II in 2008.
- Haiti and Costa Rica relegated to Group IV in 2008.

=== Group IV ===
The Americas Zone was one of the three zones of the regional Davis Cup competition in 2007.

In the Americas Zone there were four different tiers, called groups, in which teams competed against each other to advance to the upper tier. The four teams in Group IV played in a single Round-robin tournament. The top two teams were promoted to the Americas Zone Group III in 2008. All other teams remained in Group IV.

== Draw ==
- Venue: Federación Nacional de Tenis, Guatemala City, Guatemala (hard)
- Date: 20–22 June
- Withdrawn: Bermuda, Eastern Caribbean, Saint Lucia

		ARU	HON	ISV	TRI
1	Aruba (3–0)		2–1	2–1	2–1
2	Honduras (2–1)	1–2		2–1	2–1
3	U.S. Virgin Islands (1–2)	1–2	1–2		2–1
4	Trinidad and Tobago (0–3)	1–2	1–2	1–2	

- Aruba and Honduras promoted to Group III in 2008.

== Results ==
=== Honduras vs. U.S. Virgin Islands ===
Honduras
2
Federación Nacional de Tenis, Guatemala City, Guatemala
20 June 2007
Hard

U.S. Virgin Islands
1

			1	2	3
1	(Honduras) (United States Virgin Islands)	José Moncada; Terrance Eugene Highfield	3; 6	7; 5	7; 5
2	(Honduras) (United States Virgin Islands)	Calton Álvarez; Kristepher Elien	6^{2} 7^{7}	6; 1	6; 4
3	(Honduras) (United States Virgin Islands)	Ricardo Lau Cooper / José Moncada; Kristepher Elien / Terrance Eugene Highfield	6; 2	3; 6	2; 6

=== Trinidad and Tobago vs. Aruba ===
Trinidad and Tobago
1
Federación Nacional de Tenis, Guatemala City, Guatemala
20 June 2007
Hard

Aruba
2

			1	2	3
1	(Trinidad and Tobago) (Aruba)	Brent Ching; Gian Hodgson	6; 4	0; 6	1; 6
2	(Trinidad and Tobago) (Aruba)	Richard Brown; Clifford Giel	1; 6	6; 3	3; 6
3	(Trinidad and Tobago) (Aruba)	Brent Ching / Simeon Sealy; Sjoerd de Vries / Clifford Giel	6; 3	3; 6	6; 3

=== Honduras vs. Aruba ===
Honduras
1
Federación Nacional de Tenis, Guatemala City, Guatemala
21 June 2007
Hard

Aruba
2

			1	2	3
1	(Honduras) (Aruba)	José Moncada; Gian Hodgson	7^{7} 6^{3}	6; 3
2	(Honduras) (Aruba)	Calton Álvarez; Clifford Giel	4; 6	5; 7
3	(Honduras) (Aruba)	Pablo Costa / José Moncada; Sjoerd de Vries / Clifford Giel	0; 6	3; 6

=== Trinidad and Tobago vs. U.S. Virgin Islands ===
Trinidad and Tobago
1
Federación Nacional de Tenis, Guatemala City, Guatemala
21 June 2007
Hard

U.S. Virgin Islands
2

			1	2	3
1	(Trinidad and Tobago) (United States Virgin Islands)	Simeon Sealy; Terrance Eugene Highfield	3; 6	4; 6
2	(Trinidad and Tobago) (United States Virgin Islands)	Brent Ching; Kristepher Elien	4; 6	3; 6
3	(Trinidad and Tobago) (United States Virgin Islands)	Richard Brown / Lendl Smith; Terrance Eugene Highfield / Kevin Motta	6; 2	6; 3

=== Honduras vs. Trinidad and Tobago ===
Honduras
2
Federación Nacional de Tenis, Guatemala City, Guatemala
22 June 2007
Hard

Trinidad and Tobago
1

			1	2	3
1	(Honduras) (Trinidad and Tobago)	José Moncada; Lendl Smith	6; 1	6; 3
2	(Honduras) (Trinidad and Tobago)	Calton Álvarez; Richard Brown	5; 7	6^{5} 7^{7}
3	(Honduras) (Trinidad and Tobago)	Calton Álvarez / José Moncada; Brent Ching / Simeon Sealy	6; 0	6; 0

=== U.S. Virgin Islands vs. Aruba ===
U.S. Virgin Islands
1
Federación Nacional de Tenis, Guatemala City, Guatemala
22 June 2007
Hard

Aruba
2

			1	2	3
1	(United States Virgin Islands) (Aruba)	Terrance Eugene Highfield; Gian Hodgson	2; 6	4; 6
2	(United States Virgin Islands) (Aruba)	Kristepher Elien; Clifford Giel	6; 3	6; 3
3	(United States Virgin Islands) (Aruba)	Kristepher Elien / Terrance Eugene Highfield; Sjoerd de Vries / Clifford Giel	3; 6	7; 5	5; 7

== Asia/Oceania Zone ==
=== Group I ===
Second-round play-offs
Almaty, Kazakhstan (indoor hard)
China	2
Kazakhstan	3

First-round play-offs
Taipei, Taiwan (indoor carpet)
Chinese Taipei	3
China	2
Almaty, Kazakhstan (indoor hard)
S	India	3
Kazakhstan	2

First Round
Taipei, Taiwan (indoor carpet)
S	Thailand	3
Chinese Taipei	2
Beijing, China (indoor hard)
S	Japan	4
China	1
Namangan, Uzbekistan (indoor clay)
Uzbekistan	4
S	India	1
Chuncheon, South Korea (indoor carpet)
Kazakhstan	0
S	South Korea	5

Second Round
Osaka, Japan (indoor carpet)
S	Thailand	0
S	Japan	5
Seoul, South Korea (hard)
Uzbekistan	0
S	South Korea	5

- China relegated to Group II in 2008.
- Japan and South Korea advance to World Group play-off.

=== Group II ===
Play-offs
Apia, Samoa (hard)
1	Pakistan	2
Pacific Oceania	3
Tehran, Iran (clay)
Iran	2
Hong Kong	3

First Round
Manila, Philippines (hard)
1	Pakistan	1
Philippines	4
Dunedin, New Zealand (indoor carpet)
3	New Zealand	5
Pacific Oceania	0
Kuwait City, Kuwait (hard)
Iran	1
4	Kuwait	4
Hong Kong, China (hard)
Hong Kong	2
2	Indonesia	3

Second Round
Auckland, New Zealand (outdoor carpet)
Philippines	4
3	New Zealand	1
Kuwait City, Kuwait (hard)
4	Kuwait	4
2	Indonesia	1

Third Round
Kuwait City, Kuwait (hard)
Philippines	5
4	Kuwait	0

- Iran and Pakistan relegated to Group III in 2008.
- Philippines promoted to Group I in 2008.

=== Group III ===
Venue: Sri Lanka Tennis Association, Colombo, Sri Lanka (hard)
Date: 18–22 July

	Pool A	LIB	UAE	SIN	KSA
1	Lebanon (3–0)		3–0	3–0	2–1
2	United Arab Emirates (2–1)	0–3		2–1	2–1
3	Singapore (1–2)	0–3	1–2		2–1
4	Saudi Arabia (0–3)	1–2	1–2	1–2	

	Pool B	OMA	SRI	VIE	MAS
1	Oman (3–0)		2–1	2–1	2–1
2	Sri Lanka (2–1)	1–2		2–1	2–1
3	Vietnam (1–2)	1–2	1–2		2–1
4	Malaysia (0–3)	1–2	1–2	1–2	

Top two teams advance to 1st–4th Play-off, bottom two teams advance to 5th–8th Play-off. Scores in italics carried over from pools.

	1st–4th Play-off	OMA	LIB	SRI	UAE
1	Oman (2–1, 6r)		1–2	2–1	3–0
2	Lebanon (2–1, 6r)	2–1		1–2	3–0
3	Sri Lanka (2–1, 5r)	1–2	2–1		2–1
4	United Arab Emirates (0–3)	0–3	0–3	1–2	

	5th–8th Play-off	VIE	MAS	SIN	KSA
1	Vietnam (3–0)		2–1	2–1	2–1
2	Malaysia (2–1)	1–2		3–0	2–1
3	Singapore (1–2)	1–2	0–3		2–1
4	Saudi Arabia (0–3)	1–2	1–2	1–2	

Note: Oman/Lebanon/Sri Lanka tie broken on number of rubbers won.

- Oman and Lebanon promoted to Group II in 2008.
- Singapore and Saudi Arabia relegated to Group IV in 2008.

=== Group IV ===
Venue: Theinbyu Tennis Plaza, Yangon, Myanmar (hard)
Date: 9–13 May

	Pool A	TJK	BAN	TKM	JOR	BRN
1	Tajikistan (4–0)		3–0	3–0	2–1	2–1
2	Bangladesh (3–1)	0–3		2–1	3–0	3–0
3	Turkmenistan (2–2)	0–3	1–2		2–1	2–1
4	Jordan (1–3)	1–2	0–3	1–2		2–1
5	Bahrain (0–4)	1–2	0–3	1–2	1–2	

	Pool B	SYR	MYA	QAT	IRQ	BRU
1	Syria (4–0)		3–0	3–0	3–0	3–0
2	Myanmar (3–1)	0–3		3–0	3–0	3–0
3	Qatar (2–2)	0–3	0–3		2–1	3–0
4	Iraq (1–3)	0–3	0–3	1–2		3–0
5	Brunei (0–4)	0–3	0–3	0–3	0–3	

- Tajikistan and Syria promoted to Group III in 2008.

== Europe/Africa Zone ==
=== Group I ===
Second Round Play-offs
Esch-sur-Alzette, Lux. (ind. hard)
Macedonia	3
Luxembourg	2
Rotterdam, Netherlands (indoor hard)
Portugal	0
S	Netherlands	5

First Round Play-offs
bye
Macedonia
Alghero, Italy (hard)
S	Italy	4
Luxembourg	1
Portugal
bye
bye
S	Netherlands

First Round
S	Slovakia
bye
Macedonia
bye
S	Italy
bye
Ramat HaSharon, Israel (hard)
Israel	5
Luxembourg	0
Tbilisi, Georgia (indoor carpet)
Georgia	3
Portugal	2
bye
S	Serbia
bye
Great Britain
bye
S	Netherlands

Second Round
Skopje, Macedonia (clay)
S	Slovakia	5
Macedonia	0
Ramat HaSharon, Israel (hard)
S	Italy	2
Israel	3
Belgrade, Serbia (indoor clay)
Georgia	0
S	Serbia	5
Birmingham, England (indoor hard)
Great Britain	4
S	Netherlands	1

- Luxembourg and Portugal relegated to Group II in 2008.
- Slovakia, Israel, Serbia, and Great Britain advance to World Group Play-off.

=== Group II ===
Relegation Play-offs
Hornbæk, Denmark (hard)
Denmark	3
Estonia	0
Lagos, Nigeria (hard)
S	Ukraine	5
Nigeria	0
Nicosia, Cyprus (clay)
S	Bulgaria	1
Cyprus	4
Svingvoll, Norway (hard)
S	Algeria	4
Norway	1

First Round
Agdal, Morocco (clay)
S	Morocco	4
Denmark	1
Tallinn, Estonia (indoor carpet)
S	Slovenia	3
Estonia	2
Ioannina, Greece (clay)
S	Ukraine	2
Greece	3
Abuja, Nigeria (hard)
S	Poland	5
Nigeria	0
Jūrmala, Latvia (indoor carpet)
Latvia	4
S	Bulgaria	1
Nicosia, Cyprus (clay)
Cyprus	2
S	Finland	3
Algiers, Algeria (clay)
Monaco	5
S	Algeria	0
Oslo, Norway (indoor hard)
Norway	1
S	Hungary	4

Second Round
Portorož, Slovenia (hard)
S	Morocco	3
S	Slovenia	2
Thessaloniki, Greece (clay)
Greece	0
S	Poland	5
Tampere, Finland (clay)
Latvia	3
S	Finland	2
Budapest, Hungary (clay)
Monaco	4
S	Hungary	1

Third Round
Puszczykowo, Poland (indoor carpet)
S	Morocco	1
S	Poland	4
Jūrmala, Latvia (indoor carpet)
Latvia	5
Monaco	0

- Bulgaria, Norway, Latvia, and Poland relegated to Group III in 2008.
- Estonia and Nigeria promoted to Group I in 2008.

=== Group III ===
==== Zone A ====
Venue: Smash Tennis Academy, Cairo, Egypt (clay)
Date: 9–13 May

	Pool A	IRL	LTU	MDA	BIH
1	Ireland (3–0)		2–1	3–0	3–0
2	Lithuania (2–1)	1–2		2–1	2–1
3	Moldova (1–2)	0–3	1–2		2–1
4	Bosnia and Herzegovina (0–3)	0–3	1–2	1–2	

	Pool B	EGY	TUR	SMR	ISL
1	Egypt (3–0)		2–1	3–0	3–0
2	Turkey (2–1)	1–2		3–0	2–1
3	San Marino (1–2)	0–3	0–3		2–1
4	Iceland (0–3)	0–3	1–2	1–2	

Top two teams advance to 1st–4th Play-off, bottom two teams advance to 5th–8th Play-off. Scores in italics carried over from pools.

	1st–4th Play-off	IRL	EGY	LTU	TUR
1	Ireland (3–0)		3–0	2–1	2–1
2	Egypt (2–1)	0–3		2–1	2–1
3	Lithuania (1–2)	1–2	1–2		2–1
4	Turkey (0–3)	1–2	1–2	1–2	

	5th–8th Play-off	MDA	BIH	SMR	ISL
1	Moldova (3–0)		2–1	3–0	2–1
2	Bosnia and Herzegovina (2–1)	1–2		3–0	3–0
3	San Marino (1–2)	0–3	0–3		2–1
4	Iceland (0–3)	1–2	0–3	1–2	

- Ireland and Egypt promoted to Group II in 2008.
- San Marino and Iceland relegated to Group IV in 2008.

==== Zone B ====
Venue: Avenir Sportif de la Marsa, Tunis, Tunisia (clay)
Date: 9–13 May

	Pool A	RSA	CIV	MRI	GHA
1	South Africa (3–0)		3–0	3–0	3–0
2	Ivory Coast (2–1)	0–3		2–1	3–0
3	Mauritius (1–2)	0–3	1–2		3–0
4	Ghana (0–3)	0–3	0–3	0–3	

	Pool B	TUN	MAD	ZIM	NAM
1	Tunisia (3–0)		3–0	3–0	3–0
2	Madagascar (2–1)	0–3		3–0	3–0
3	Zimbabwe (1–2)	0–3	0–3		2–1
4	Namibia (0–3)	0–3	0–3	1–2	

Top two teams advance to 1st–4th Play-off, bottom two teams advance to 5th–8th Play-off. Scores in italics carried over from pools.

	1st–4th Play-off	RSA	TUN	CIV	MAD
1	South Africa (3–0)		3–0	3–0	3–0
2	Tunisia (2–1)	0–3		3–0	3–0
3	Ivory Coast (1–2)	0–3	0–3		2–1
4	Madagascar (0–3)	0–3	0–3	1–2	

	5th–8th Play-off	ZIM	GHA	MRI	NAM
1	Zimbabwe (2–1, 6r)		1–2	3–0	2–1
2	Ghana (2–1, 5r, 14/11 s)	2–1		0–3	3–0
3	Mauritius (2–1, 5r, 11/11 s)	0–3	3–0		2–1
4	Namibia (0–3)	1–2	0–3	1–2	

Note: Ghana/Mauritius tie broken on percentage of sets won.

- South Africa and Tunisia promoted to Group II in 2008.
- Mauritius and Namibia relegated to Group IV in 2008.

The Europe/Africa Zone was one of the three zones of the regional Davis Cup competition in 2007.

In the Europe/Africa Zone there were four different tiers, called groups, in which teams competed against each other to advance to the upper tier. Group III was split into two tournaments. One tournament was held in Smash Tennis Academy, Cairo, Egypt, May 9–13, on outdoor clay courts, while the other was held in Avenir Sportif de la Marsa, Tunis, Tunisia, May 9–13, also on outdoor clay courts.

== Format ==
The eight teams in the Tunis tournament were split into two pools and played in a round-robin format. The top two teams of each pool advanced to the promotion pool, from which the two top teams were promoted to the Europe/Africa Zone Group II in 2008. The bottom two teams of each group were placed in the relegation pool, from which the two bottom teams were demoted to the Europe/Africa Zone Group IV in 2008.

== Pool A ==
	Pool A	RSA	CIV	MRI	GHA
1	South Africa (3–0)		3–0	3–0	3–0
2	Ivory Coast (2–1)	0–3		2–1	3–0
3	Mauritius (1–2)	0–3	1–2		3–0
4	Ghana (0–3)	0–3	0–3	0–3	

=== South Africa vs. Mauritius ===
South Africa
3
Avenir Sportif de la Marsa, Tunis, Tunisia
9 May 2007
Clay

Mauritius
0

			1	2	3
1	(South Africa) (Mauritius)	Fritz Wolmarans; Kamil Patel	6; 4	6; 3
2	(South Africa) (Mauritius)	Rik de Voest; Jean-Marcel Bourgault Du Coudray	6; 2	6; 3
3	(South Africa) (Mauritius)	Jeff Coetzee / Rik de Voest; Bruno Gorayah / Kamil Patel	6; 1	6; 0

=== Ghana vs. Ivory Coast ===
Ghana
0
Avenir Sportif de la Marsa, Tunis, Tunisia
9 May 2007
Clay

Ivory Coast
3

			1	2	3
1	(Ghana) (Ivory Coast)	Menford Owusu; Claude N'Goran	1; 6	3; 6
2	(Ghana) (Ivory Coast)	Mohammed Salifu; Valentin Sanon	0; 6	7; 5	1; 6
3	(Ghana) (Ivory Coast)	Emmanuel Mensah / Michael Nortey; Valentin Sanon / Lavry Sylvain N'Yaba	6; 3	5; 7	2; 6

=== South Africa vs. Ivory Coast ===
South Africa
3
Avenir Sportif de la Marsa, Tunis, Tunisia
10 May 2007
Clay

Ivory Coast
0

			1	2	3
1	(South Africa) (Ivory Coast)	Fritz Wolmarans; Claude N'Goran	6; 1	6; 3
2	(South Africa) (Ivory Coast)	Rik de Voest; Valentin Sanon	6; 3	6; 1
3	(South Africa) (Ivory Coast)	Rik de Voest / Fritz Wolmarans; Claude N'Goran / Lavry Sylvain N'Yaba	6; 1	6; 3

=== Ghana vs. Mauritius ===
Ghana
0
Avenir Sportif de la Marsa, Tunis, Tunisia
10 May 2007
Clay

Mauritius
3

			1	2	3
1	(Ghana) (Mauritius)	Menford Owusu; Kamil Patel	6; 2	1; 6	4; 6
2	(Ghana) (Mauritius)	Mohammed Salifu; Jean-Marcel Bourgault Du Coudray	6^{5} 7^{7}	6; 1	3; 6
3	(Ghana) (Mauritius)	Emmanuel Mensah / Michael Nortey; Bruno Gorayah / Kamil Patel	3; 6	7^{7} 6^{2}	3; 6

=== South Africa vs. Ghana ===
South Africa
3
Avenir Sportif de la Marsa, Tunis, Tunisia
11 May 2007
Clay

Ghana
0

			1	2	3
1	(South Africa) (Ghana)	Fritz Wolmarans; Michael Nortey	6; 1	6; 1
2	(South Africa) (Ghana)	Wesley Moodie; Mohammed Salifu	6; 0	6; 3
3	(South Africa) (Ghana)	Rik de Voest / Fritz Wolmarans; Michael Nortey / Mohammed Salifu	6; 4	6; 2

=== Ivory Coast vs. Mauritius ===
Ivory Coast
2
Avenir Sportif de la Marsa, Tunis, Tunisia
11 May 2007
Clay

Mauritius
1

			1	2	3
1	(Ivory Coast) (Mauritius)	Claude N'Goran; Bruno Gorayah	6; 1	6; 0
2	(Ivory Coast) (Mauritius)	Valentin Sanon; Jean-Marcel Bourgault Du Coudray	6; 2	1; 0		retired
3	(Ivory Coast) (Mauritius)	Claude N'Goran / Lavry Sylvain N'Yaba; Bruno Gorayah / Kamil Patel	1; 6	0; 6

== Pool B ==
	Pool B	TUN	MAD	ZIM	NAM
1	Tunisia (3–0)		3–0	3–0	3–0
2	Madagascar (2–1)	0–3		3–0	3–0
3	Zimbabwe (1–2)	0–3	0–3		2–1
4	Namibia (0–3)	0–3	0–3	1–2	

=== Zimbabwe vs. Madagascar ===
Zimbabwe
0
Avenir Sportif de la Marsa, Tunis, Tunisia
9 May 2007
Clay

Madagascar
3

			1	2	3
1	(Zimbabwe) (Madagascar)	Takanyi Garanganga; Thierry Rajaobelina	2; 6	6; 3	3; 6
2	(Zimbabwe) (Madagascar)	Genius Chidzikwe; Tony Rajaobelina	4; 6	5; 7
3	(Zimbabwe) (Madagascar)	Nigel Badza / Genius Chidzikwe; Germain Rasolondrazana / Jacob Rasolondrazana	6^{7} 7^{9}	1; 6

=== Tunisia vs. Namibia ===
Tunisia
3
Avenir Sportif de la Marsa, Tunis, Tunisia
9 May 2007
Clay

Namibia
0

			1	2	3
1	(Tunisia) (Namibia)	Walid Jallali; Johan Theron	6; 4	6; 2
2	(Tunisia) (Namibia)	Malek Jaziri; Jurgens Strydom	6; 2	6; 2
3	(Tunisia) (Namibia)	Walid Jallali / Wael Kilani; Jean-Pierre Huish / Jurgens Strydom	7^{7} 6^{4}	6; 0

=== Zimbabwe vs. Namibia ===
Zimbabwe
2
Avenir Sportif de la Marsa, Tunis, Tunisia
10 May 2007
Clay

Namibia
1

			1	2	3
1	(Zimbabwe) (Namibia)	Takanyi Garanganga; Johan Theron	2; 6	6; 2	7; 5
2	(Zimbabwe) (Namibia)	Genius Chidzikwe; Jurgens Strydom	3; 6	6; 3	6; 2
3	(Zimbabwe) (Namibia)	Nigel Badza / Tinotenda Chanakira; Jean-Pierre Huish / Jurgens Strydom	2; 6	6^{11} 7^{13}

=== Tunisia vs. Madagascar ===
Tunisia
3
Avenir Sportif de la Marsa, Tunis, Tunisia
10 May 2007
Clay

Madagascar
0

			1	2	3
1	(Tunisia) (Madagascar)	Walid Jallali; Tony Rajaobelina	7^{8} 6^{6}	4; 6	7; 5
2	(Tunisia) (Madagascar)	Malek Jaziri; Jacob Rasolondrazana	6; 1	6; 2
3	(Tunisia) (Madagascar)	Wael Kilani / Slah Mbarek; Thierry Rajaobelina / Germain Rasolondrazana	6; 0	6; 2

=== Zimbabwe vs. Tunisia ===
Zimbabwe
0
Avenir Sportif de la Marsa, Tunis, Tunisia
11 May 2007
Clay

Tunisia
3

			1	2	3
1	(Zimbabwe) (Tunisia)	Takanyi Garanganga; Walid Jallali	2; 6	7^{7} 6^{2}	1; 6
2	(Zimbabwe) (Tunisia)	Genius Chidzikwe; Malek Jaziri	2; 6	4; 6
3	(Zimbabwe) (Tunisia)	Nigel Badza / Tinotenda Chanakira; Wael Kilani / Slah Mbarek	0; 6	1; 6

=== Namibia vs. Madagascar ===
Namibia
0
Avenir Sportif de la Marsa, Tunis, Tunisia
11 May 2007
Clay

Madagascar
3

			1	2	3
1	(Namibia) (Madagascar)	Jean-Pierre Huish; Thierry Rajaobelina	4; 6	3; 6
2	(Namibia) (Madagascar)	Jurgens Strydom; Jacob Rasolondrazana	1; 6	6; 3	6; 8
3	(Namibia) (Madagascar)	Johan De Witt / Jean-Pierre Huish; Tony Rajaobelina / Germain Rasolondrazana	4; 6	4; 6

== Promotion pool ==
The top two teams from each of Pools A and B advanced to the Promotion pool. Results and points from games against the opponent from the preliminary round were carried forward.

(scores in italics carried over from Groups)

	1st–4th Play-off	RSA	TUN	CIV	MAD
1	South Africa (3–0)		3–0	3–0	3–0
2	Tunisia (2–1)	0–3		3–0	3–0
3	Ivory Coast (1–2)	0–3	0–3		2–1
4	Madagascar (0–3)	0–3	0–3	1–2	

South Africa and Tunisia promoted to Group II in 2008.

=== South Africa vs. Tunisia ===
South Africa
3
Avenir Sportif de la Marsa, Tunis, Tunisia
12 May 2007
Clay

Tunisia
0

			1	2	3
1	(South Africa) (Tunisia)	Wesley Moodie; Slah Mbarek	6; 3	6; 2
2	(South Africa) (Tunisia)	Rik de Voest; Wael Kilani	6; 3	6; 3
3	(South Africa) (Tunisia)	Jeff Coetzee / Fritz Wolmarans; Walid Jallali / Slah Mbarek	6; 4	6; 2

=== Madagascar vs. Ivory Coast ===
Madagascar
1
Avenir Sportif de la Marsa, Tunis, Tunisia
12 May 2007
Clay

Ivory Coast
2

			1	2	3
1	(Madagascar) (Ivory Coast)	Thierry Rajaobelina; Claude N'Goran	6; 3	1; 6	6; 3
2	(Madagascar) (Ivory Coast)	Jacob Rasolondrazana; Valentin Sanon	6; 2	3; 6	1; 6
3	(Madagascar) (Ivory Coast)	Thierry Rajaobelina / Jacob Rasolondrazana; Claude N'Goran / Valentin Sanon	2; 6	3; 6

=== South Africa vs. Madagascar ===
South Africa
3
Avenir Sportif de la Marsa, Tunis, Tunisia
13 May 2007
Clay

Madagascar
0

			1	2	3
1	(South Africa) (Madagascar)	Wesley Moodie; Thierry Rajaobelina	6; 3	6; 4
2	(South Africa) (Madagascar)	Rik de Voest; Jacob Rasolondrazana	6; 1	6; 1
3	(South Africa) (Madagascar)	Jeff Coetzee / Fritz Wolmarans; Thierry Rajaobelina / Jacob Rasolondrazana	6; 1	6; 0

=== Tunisia vs. Ivory Coast ===
Tunisia
3
Avenir Sportif de la Marsa, Tunis, Tunisia
13 May 2007
Clay

Ivory Coast
0

			1	2	3
1	(Tunisia) (Ivory Coast)	Walid Jallali; Lavry Sylvain N'Yaba	6; 2	6; 4
2	(Tunisia) (Ivory Coast)	Malek Jaziri; Valentin Sanon	6; 3	6; 3
3	(Tunisia) (Ivory Coast)	Wael Kilani / Slah Mbarek; Claude N'Goran / Lavry Sylvain N'Yaba	3; 0			retired

== Relegation pool ==
The bottom two teams from Pools A and B were placed in the relegation group. Results and points from games against the opponent from the preliminary round were carried forward.

(scores in italics carried over from Groups)

	5th–8th Play-off	ZIM	GHA	MRI	NAM
1	Zimbabwe (2–1, 6r)		1–2	3–0	2–1
2	Ghana (2–1, 5r, 14/11 s)	2–1		0–3	3–0
3	Mauritius (2–1, 5r, 11/11 s)	0–3	3–0		2–1
4	Namibia (0–3)	1–2	0–3	1–2	

Note: Ghana/Mauritius tie broken on percentage of sets won.

Mauritius and Namibia relegated to Group IV in 2008.

=== Zimbabwe vs. Mauritius ===
Zimbabwe
3
Avenir Sportif de la Marsa, Tunis, Tunisia
12 May 2007
Clay

Mauritius
0

			1	2	3
1	(Zimbabwe) (Mauritius)	Takanyi Garanganga; Bruno Gorayah	6; 3	6; 4
2	(Zimbabwe) (Mauritius)	Genius Chidzikwe; Kamil Patel	6; 2	2; 6	6; 1
3	(Zimbabwe) (Mauritius)	Nigel Badza / Genius Chidzikwe; Bruno Gorayah / Kamil Patel	6; 2	7^{7} 6^{5}

=== Ghana vs. Namibia ===
Ghana
3
Avenir Sportif de la Marsa, Tunis, Tunisia
12 May 2007
Clay

Namibia
0

			1	2	3
1	(Ghana) (Namibia)	Menford Owusu; Jean-Pierre Huish	6; 1	6; 4
2	(Ghana) (Namibia)	Mohammed Salifu; Jurgens Strydom	6^{3} 7^{7}	6; 3	6; 4
3	(Ghana) (Namibia)	Emmanuel Mensah / Michael Nortey; Johan De Witt / Jean-Pierre Huish	6; 2	3; 6	6; 3

=== Zimbabwe vs. Ghana ===
Zimbabwe
1
Avenir Sportif de la Marsa, Tunis, Tunisia
13 May 2007
Clay

Ghana
2

			1	2	3
1	(Zimbabwe) (Ghana)	Takanyi Garanganga; Menford Owusu	6; 4	3; 6	10; 8
2	(Zimbabwe) (Ghana)	Genius Chidzikwe; Mohammed Salifu	3; 6	2; 6
3	(Zimbabwe) (Ghana)	Genius Chidzikwe / Takanyi Garanganga; Emmanuel Mensah / Mohammed Salifu	6; 1	5; 7	1; 6

=== Mauritius vs. Namibia ===
Mauritius
2
Avenir Sportif de la Marsa, Tunis, Tunisia
13 May 2007
Clay

Namibia
1

			1	2	3
1	(Mauritius) (Namibia)	Kamil Patel; Jean-Pierre Huish	6; 0	6; 1
2	(Mauritius) (Namibia)	Jean-Marcel Bourgault Du Coudray; Jurgens Strydom	4; 6	3; 6
3	(Mauritius) (Namibia)	Jean-Marcel Bourgault Du Coudray / Kamil Patel; Jean-Pierre Huish / Jurgens Strydom	6; 4	6; 3

== Final standings ==
Rank	Team
1	South Africa
2	Tunisia
3	Ivory Coast
4	Madagascar
5	Zimbabwe
6	Ghana
7	Mauritius
8	Namibia

- South Africa and Tunisia promoted to Group II in 2008.
- Mauritius and Namibia relegated to Group IV in 2008.

=== Group IV ===
- Venue: Master Class Tennis and Fitness Club, Yerevan, Armenia (clay)
- Date: 8–12 August
- Withdrawn: Azerbaijan, Benin, Gabon, Libya, Malta, Senegal, and Uganda

	Group IV	MNE	ARM	BOT	AND	RWA
1	Montenegro (4–0)		3–0	3–0	3–0	3–0
2	Armenia (3–1)	0–3		2–1	2–1	2–1
3	Botswana (2–2)	0–3	1–2		2–1	2–1
4	Andorra (1–3)	0–3	1–2	1–2		3–0
5	Rwanda (0–4)	0–3	1–2	1–2	0–3	

- Montenegro, Armenia, Botswana, and Andorra promoted to Group III in 2008.
