= 2012 U.S. Men's Clay Court Championships – Doubles =

Doubles
- 2012 U.S. Men's Clay Court Championships

Final
- Champions: (United States) James Blake (United States) Sam Querrey
- Runners-up: (Philippines) Treat Conrad Huey (United Kingdom) Dominic Inglot
- Score: 7–6^{(16–14)}, 6–4

Details
- Draw: 16
- Seeds: 4

Events
Singles	Doubles
- U.S. Men's Clay Court Championships

Bob Bryan and Mike Bryan were the defending champions, but this year they decided not to participate.
Americans James Blake and Sam Querrey won the tournament defeating Treat Conrad Huey and Dominic Inglot in the final by a score of 7–6^{(16–14)}, 6–4.

== Seeds ==
1. (Russia) Alex Bogomolov Jr. / (United States) Scott Lipsky (quarterfinals)
2. (The Bahamas) Mark Knowles / (Belgium) Xavier Malisse (quarterfinals)
3. (Germany) Michael Kohlmann / (Germany) Alexander Waske (quarterfinals)
4. (Sweden) Johan Brunström / (Belgium) Dick Norman (quarterfinals)

== Draw ==
Key

- Q = Qualifier
- WC = Wild card
- LL = Lucky loser
- Alt = Alternate
- ITF = ITF entry
- PR = Protected ranking
- SR = Special ranking
- SE = Special exempt
- JE = Junior exempt
- JR = Junior Accelerator Programme entrant
- CO = College Accelerator Programme entrant
- NG = Next Gen Accelerator Program entrant
- w/o = Walkover
- r = Retired
- d = Defaulted

=== Draw ===
First round
1	(Russia) A Bogomolov Jr. (United States) S Lipsky	7^{8}	6
(Germany) P Marx (Croatia) L Zovko	6^{6}	0
(United States) J Blake (United States) S Querrey	2	7^{12}	[10]
(Brazil) J Souza (Argentina) H Zeballos	6	6^{10}	[8]
3	(Germany) M Kohlmann (Germany) A Waske	1	6	[10]
WC	(United States) R Kendrick (United States) R Sweeting	6	2	[7]
(Argentina) C Berlocq (Argentina) D Junqueira	3	3
(Croatia) I Karlović (Germany) F Moser	6	6
(United States) J Cerretani (United States) JP Fruttero	3	3
WC	(United States) B Reynolds (United States) M Russell	6	6
(United Kingdom) J Delgado (United Kingdom) K Skupski	4	7^{8}	[5]
4	(Sweden) J Brunström (Belgium) D Norman	6	6^{6}	[10]
(Japan) T Ito (Japan) G Soeda	4	6^{6}
(Philippines) TC Huey (United Kingdom) D Inglot	6	7^{8}
(Germany) M Emmrich (Sweden) A Siljeström	7	2	[6]
2	(The Bahamas) M Knowles (Belgium) X Malisse	5	6	[10]

Quarterfinals
1	(Russia) A Bogomolov Jr. (United States) S Lipsky	3	3
(United States) J Blake (United States) S Querrey	6	6
3	(Germany) M Kohlmann (Germany) A Waske	5	5
(Croatia) I Karlović (Germany) F Moser	7	7
WC	(United States) B Reynolds (United States) M Russell	6	6
4	(Sweden) J Brunström (Belgium) D Norman	3	2
(Philippines) TC Huey (United Kingdom) D Inglot	3	6	[10]
2	(The Bahamas) M Knowles (Belgium) X Malisse	6	4	[8]

Semifinals
(United States) J Blake (United States) S Querrey	3	6	[10]
(Croatia) I Karlović (Germany) F Moser	6	3	[8]
WC	(United States) B Reynolds (United States) M Russell	3	6	[6]
(Philippines) TC Huey (United Kingdom) D Inglot	6	3	[10]

Final
(United States) J Blake (United States) S Querrey	7^{16}	6
(Philippines) TC Huey (United Kingdom) D Inglot	6^{14}	4
