= 2003 Hopman Cup =

- Date: 28 December 2002 – 4 January 2003
- Edition: XV
- Surface: Hard indoor
- Location: Perth, Western Australia
- Venue: Burswood Entertainment Complex

Champions
- United States
← 2002 ·	Hopman Cup	· 2004 →

The 2003 Hopman Cup (also known as the Hyundai Hopman Cup for sponsorship reasons) was the 15th edition of the Hopman Cup tennis sporting event, held on 28 December 2002 through 4 January 2003 at the Burswood Entertainment Complex in Perth, Western Australia. The champions are Serena Williams and James Blake of the United States, who defeated Alicia Molik and Lleyton Hewitt of Australia in the final.

== Play-off ==
=== Uzbekistan vs. Paraguay ===
Uzbekistan
2
Burswood Entertainment Complex
28 December 2002
Hard (i)

Paraguay
1

			1	2	3
1	(Uzbekistan) (Paraguay)	Iroda Tulyaganova; Rossana de los Ríos	4; 6	2; 6
2	(Uzbekistan) (Paraguay)	Oleg Ogorodov; Ramón Delgado	7; 5	6; 3
3	(Uzbekistan) (Paraguay)	Iroda Tulyaganova / Oleg Ogorodov; Rossana de los Ríos / Ramón Delgado	6; 4	7; 6

== Champion's Group ==
=== Teams and standings ===
- Belgium – Kim Clijsters and Xavier Malisse (Round robin win–loss: 2–1; match win–loss: 6–3)
- Spain – Virginia Ruano Pascual and Tommy Robredo (Round robin win–loss 1–2; match win–loss: 3–6)
- Paraguay – Rossana de los Ríos and Ramón Delgado (Round robin win–loss: 0–1; match win–loss: 1–2)
- United States – Serena Williams and James Blake (Round robin win–loss: 3–0; match win–loss: 8–1)
- Uzbekistan – Iroda Tulyaganova and Oleg Ogorodov (Round robin win–loss: 1–3; match win–loss: 3–9)

=== Belgium vs. Spain ===
Belgium
2
Burswood Entertainment Complex
30 December 2002
Hard (i)

Spain
1

			1	2	3
1	(Belgium) (Spain)	Kim Clijsters; Virginia Ruano Pascual	6; 1	6; 0
2	(Belgium) (Spain)	Xavier Malisse; Tommy Robredo	6; 7	6; 3	3; 6
3	(Belgium) (Spain)	Kim Clijsters / Xavier Malisse; Virginia Ruano Pascual / Tommy Robredo	2; 6	7; 5	[10] [7]

=== United States vs. Uzbekistan ===
United States
3
Burswood Entertainment Complex
30 December 2002
Hard (i)

Uzbekistan
0

			1	2	3
1	(United States) (Uzbekistan)	Serena Williams; Iroda Tulyaganova	6; 3	6; 2
2	(United States) (Uzbekistan)	James Blake; Oleg Ogorodov	2; 6	7; 5	6; 1
3	(United States) (Uzbekistan)	Serena Williams / James Blake; Iroda Tulyaganova / Oleg Ogorodov	6; 3	6; 1

=== United States vs. Spain ===
United States
3
Burswood Entertainment Complex
31 December 2002
Hard (i)

Spain
0

			1	2	3
1	(United States) (Spain)	Serena Williams; Virginia Ruano Pascual	6; 3	6; 3
2	(United States) (Spain)	James Blake; Tommy Robredo	6; 3	6; 0
3	(United States) (Spain)	Serena Williams / James Blake; Virginia Ruano Pascual / Tommy Robredo	6; 1	6; 4

=== Belgium vs. Uzbekistan ===
Belgium
3
Burswood Entertainment Complex
1 January 2003
Hard (i)

Uzbekistan
0

			1	2	3
1	(Belgium) (Uzbekistan)	Kim Clijsters; Iroda Tulyaganova	6; 3	6; 2
2	(Belgium) (Uzbekistan)	Xavier Malisse; Oleg Ogorodov	6; 3	6; 7	6; 2
3	(Belgium) (Uzbekistan)	Kim Clijsters / Xavier Malisse; Iroda Tulyaganova / Oleg Ogorodov	6; 1	6; 1

=== Spain vs. Uzbekistan ===
Spain
2
Burswood Entertainment Complex
3 January 2003
Hard (i)

Uzbekistan
1

			1	2	3
1	(Spain) (Uzbekistan)	Virginia Ruano Pascual; Iroda Tulyaganova	6; 7	0; 6
2	(Spain) (Uzbekistan)	Tommy Robredo; Oleg Ogorodov	6; 0	6; 4
3	(Spain) (Uzbekistan)	Virginia Ruano Pascual / Tommy Robredo; Iroda Tulyaganova / Oleg Ogorodov	6; 2	6; 4

=== United States vs. Belgium ===
United States
2
Burswood Entertainment Complex
3 January 2003
Hard (i)

Belgium
1

			1	2	3
1	(United States) (Belgium)	Serena Williams; Kim Clijsters	7; 5	6; 3
2	(United States) (Belgium)	James Blake; Xavier Malisse	6; 7	2; 6
3	(United States) (Belgium)	Serena Williams / James Blake; Kim Clijsters / Xavier Malisse	7; 6	3; 6	[10] [5]

== Finalist's Group ==
=== Teams and seedings ===
- Australia – Alicia Molik and Lleyton Hewitt (Round robin record: 3–0; win–loss record: 8–1)
- Czech Republic – Dája Bedáňová and Jiří Novák (Round robin record: 2–1; 5–4)
- Italy – Silvia Farina Elia and Davide Sanguinetti (Round robin record: 0–3; match win–loss record: 1–8)
- Slovakia – Daniela Hantuchová and Dominik Hrbatý (Round robin record: 1–2; match win–loss record: 4–5)

=== Australia vs. Italy ===
Australia
3
Burswood Entertainment Complex
29 December 2002
Hard (i)

Italy
0

			1	2	3
1	(Australia) (Italy)	Alicia Molik; Silvia Farina Elia	6; 3	6; 4
2	(Australia) (Italy)	Lleyton Hewitt; Davide Sanguinetti	6; 3	6; 1
3	(Australia) (Italy)	Alicia Molik / Lleyton Hewitt; Silvia Farina Elia / Davide Sanguinetti				w/o

=== Czech Republic vs. Slovakia ===
Czech Republic
2
Burswood Entertainment Complex
29 December 2002
Hard (i)

Slovakia
1

			1	2	3
1	(Czech Republic) (Slovakia)	Dája Bedáňová; Daniela Hantuchová	3; 6	6; 4	6; 1
2	(Czech Republic) (Slovakia)	Jiří Novák; Dominik Hrbatý	7; 6	5; 7	6; 3
3	(Czech Republic) (Slovakia)	Dája Bedáňová / Jiří Novák; Daniela Hantuchová / Dominik Hrbatý	7; 5	6; 7	[9] [11]

=== Australia vs. Slovakia ===
Australia
3
Burswood Entertainment Complex
31 December 2002
Hard (i)

Slovakia
0

			1	2	3
1	(Australia) (Slovakia)	Alicia Molik; Daniela Hantuchová	6; 4	6; 2
2	(Australia) (Slovakia)	Lleyton Hewitt; Dominik Hrbatý	6; 2	6; 0
3	(Australia) (Slovakia)	Alicia Molik / Lleyton Hewitt; Daniela Hantuchová / Dominik Hrbatý	7; 6	7; 6

=== Czech Republic vs. Italy ===
Czech Republic
2
Burswood Entertainment Complex
1 January 2003
Hard (i)

Italy
1

			1	2	3
1	(Czech Republic) (Italy)	Dája Bedáňová; Silvia Farina Elia	4; 6	6; 2	2; 6
2	(Czech Republic) (Italy)	Jiří Novák; Davide Sanguinetti	6; 7	7; 5	7; 5
3	(Czech Republic) (Italy)	Dája Bedáňová / Jiří Novák; Silvia Farina Elia / Davide Sanguinetti	6; 3	6; 3

=== Australia vs. Czech Republic ===
Australia
2
Burswood Entertainment Complex
2 January 2003
Hard (i)

Czech Republic
1

			1	2	3
1	(Australia) (Czech Republic)	Alicia Molik; Dája Bedáňová	7; 6	7; 5
2	(Australia) (Czech Republic)	Lleyton Hewitt; Jiří Novák	2; 6	6; 3	3; 6
3	(Australia) (Czech Republic)	Alicia Molik / Lleyton Hewitt; Dája Bedáňová / Jiří Novák	4; 6	7; 5	[10] [4]

=== Slovakia vs. Italy ===
Slovakia
3
Burswood Entertainment Complex
2 January 2003
Hard (i)

Italy
0

			1	2	3
1	(Slovakia) (Italy)	Daniela Hantuchová; Silvia Farina Elia	6; 4	6; 3
2	(Slovakia) (Italy)	Dominik Hrbatý; Davide Sanguinetti	6; 3	7; 6
3	(Slovakia) (Italy)	Daniela Hantuchová / Dominik Hrbatý; Silvia Farina Elia / Davide Sanguinetti	8; 3

== Final ==
=== United States vs. Australia ===
United States
3
Burswood Entertainment Complex
4 January 2003
Hard (i)

Australia
0

			1	2	3
1	(United States) (Australia)	Serena Williams; Alicia Molik	6; 2	6; 3
2	(United States) (Australia)	James Blake; Lleyton Hewitt	6; 3	6; 4
3	(United States) (Australia)	Serena Williams / James Blake; Alicia Molik / Lleyton Hewitt	6; 3	6; 2

2003 Hopman Cup Champions
(United States)
United States
Second title
