= Paraguay at the Hopman Cup =

Sporting event delegation

Paraguay
- First year: 2003
- Years played: 1
- Best finish: Lost in qualification play-off (2003)
- Most total wins: Rossana de los Ríos (1–1)
- Most singles wins: Rossana de los Ríos (1–0)
- Most doubles wins: Rossana de los Ríos (0–1); Ramón Delgado (0–1)
- Best doubles team: Rossana de los Ríos & Ramón Delgado (0–1)
- Most years played: Rossana de los Ríos (1); Ramón Delgado (1)

Paraguay is a nation that has competed at the Hopman Cup tennis tournament on one occasion, at the 15th annual staging of the tournament in 2003, when they lost to Uzbekistan in the qualification play-off.

== Players ==
This is a list of players who have played for China in the Hopman Cup.

Name	Total W–L	Singles W–L	Doubles W–L	First year played	No. of years played
Rossana de los Ríos	1–1	1–0	0–1	2003	1
Ramón Delgado	0–2	0–1	0–1	2003	1

== Results ==
Year	Competition	Location	Opponent	Score	Result
2003	Qualification Play-off	Burswood Dome, Perth	Uzbekistan	1–2	Lost
