= James Blake (tennis) =

American tennis player (born 1979)

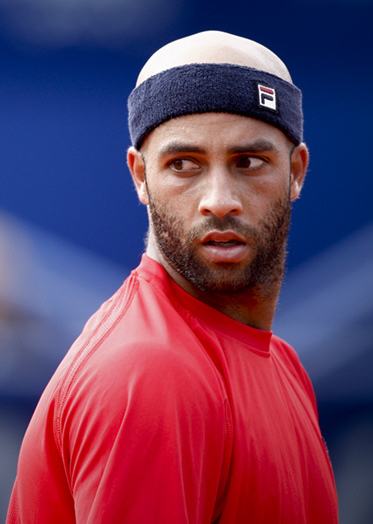
- Country (sports): United States
- Residence: Westport, Connecticut, US
- Born: December 28, 1979 (age 46) Yonkers, New York, US
- Height: 6 ft 1 in (1.85 m)
- Turned pro: 1999
- Retired: August 29, 2013
- Plays: Right-handed (one-handed backhand)
- Coach: Brian Barker (1995–2009); Kelly Jones (2009–2011)
- Prize money: US$ 7,981,882

Singles
- Career record: 366–256 (58.8%) (at ATP Tour-level, Grand Slam-level, and in Davis Cup)
- Career titles: 10
- Highest ranking: No. 4 (November 20, 2006)

Grand Slam singles results
- Australian Open: QF (2008)
- French Open: 3R (2006)
- Wimbledon: 3R (2006, 2007)
- US Open: QF (2005, 2006)

Other tournaments
- Tour Finals: F (2006)
- Olympic Games: SF – 4th (2008)

Doubles
- Career record: 132–121 (at ATP Tour-level, Grand Slam-level, and in Davis Cup)
- Career titles: 7
- Highest ranking: No. 31 (March 31, 2003)
- Current ranking: No. 2081 (June 26, 2023)

Grand Slam doubles results
- Australian Open: QF (2005)
- French Open: 2R (2002)
- Wimbledon: SF (2009)
- US Open: 2R (2000, 2001)

Team competitions
- Davis Cup: W (2007)
- Hopman Cup: W (2003, 2004)
- Last updated on: 26 June 2023.

James Riley Blake (born December 28, 1979) is an American former professional tennis player. He won 10 titles on the ATP Tour (out of 24 finals contested), reaching a career-high singles ranking of world No. 4. His career highlights included reaching the final of the 2006 Tennis Masters Cup, the semifinals of the 2008 Beijing Olympics (beating world No. 1 Roger Federer en route), the quarterfinals of the 2008 Australian Open and 2005 and 2006 US Opens, two titles at the Hopman Cup (in 2003 and 2004) and being the American No. 1 in men's singles. Blake was also a key performer for the victorious United States 2007 Davis Cup team, winning both his matches in the championship tie against Russia.

In 2004, Blake fractured a vertebra in an accident while training. He made a full recovery, and in 2005 he was presented with the Comeback Player of the Year award for his return to the tour. Later, in 2008, Blake was named the Arthur Ashe Humanitarian of the Year. Blake's autobiography, Breaking Back: How I Lost Everything and Won Back My Life, co-written with Andrew Friedman, discussed his comeback after his 2004 season. It was released on July 3. 2007, and debuted at No. 22 on the New York Times Best Seller list.

Blake retired from professional tennis at the 2013 US Open, being defeated in five sets against Ivo Karlovic and in three sets in men's doubles.

He's been the tour director of the Miami Open since 2018. He is also a commentator for ESPN.

== Early life and education ==
Blake was born in Yonkers, New York, to an African American father, Thomas Reynolds Blake, and a British mother, Betty. He has a brother Thomas, who has also been a professional tennis player, and three older half-brothers: Jason, Christopher, and Howard, and a half-sister Michelle.

Blake started playing tennis at the age of five alongside his older brother Thomas. When he was 13, he was diagnosed with severe scoliosis, and for five years as a teenager he was forced to wear a full-length back brace for 18 hours a day, though not while playing tennis.

The Blake family moved to Fairfield, Connecticut when Blake's father's job selling surgical supplies took him from New York to Hartford, Connecticut. Blake attended Fairfield High School, where a schoolmate and childhood friend was future musician John Mayer. Blake was inspired to pursue tennis after hearing his role model Arthur Ashe speak to the Harlem Junior Tennis Program. Brian Barker was his first (and longtime) coach. Blake attended Harvard University, where he was a member of the A.D. Club. He left after his sophomore year to pursue a career in professional tennis. In 2018, he was elected into the ITA Collegiate Hall of Fame.

== Career ==
=== Early career ===
==== 2001 ====
At the age of 21, Blake saw his first Davis Cup action in 2001 against India and became the third person of African-American heritage to play for the Davis Cup for the United States (after Arthur Ashe and MaliVai Washington). Ranked no. 120 in the world, Blake accepted a wild card into Cincinnati Masters. He beat a qualifier and Arnaud Clément to reach the round of 16, where he met Patrick Rafter. Blake came close to winning the first set (falling in a tiebreak), and after dropping the second set, Rafter, according to Blake's autobiography, complimented him at the net and boosted his confidence immeasurably by saying, "Now do you believe you can beat someone like me, or even me?" Blake's name became more recognizable worldwide after he pushed the eventual champion Lleyton Hewitt to five sets at the US Open.

==== 2002 ====
In January 2002, Blake won the 2002 USTA Waikoloa Challenger in Hawaii. A month later in Memphis he posted his first win over a top-10 ranked opponent, Tommy Haas, who was then ranked no. 5, and reached the final, losing to Andy Roddick. He reached the quarterfinals at the ATP Masters Series (AMS) event in Rome in May and the final at Newport in July. In August, in Cincinnati, he won his first career ATP Tour title and his first ATP Masters Series title: it came in doubles with Todd Martin, making Blake the first African-American male to win a title of any kind in Cincinnati's 101-year history. He was also the first African-American to reach a final in Cincinnati since 1969, when Arthur Ashe reached the doubles finals with Charlie Pasarell. The next week in Washington, he won his first ATP Tour singles title, beating Andre Agassi in the semifinals and Paradorn Srichaphan in the final. At the US Open, he reached the third round, where he again faced the top-ranked and world number one Lleyton Hewitt for the rematch of the previous year. In an entertaining match Blake was again defeated in five sets.

==== 2003 ====
In 2003, his best results were a quarterfinals appearance at Indian Wells; a round of 16 finish at the Australian Open, Cincinnati, and Miami; a semifinal appearance at San Jose, and a finals appearance at Long Island, where he lost to Srichaphan. Blake was eliminated from the US Open in the 3rd round by Roger Federer.

==== 2004 ====
2004 was a difficult year for Blake. In May, while practicing with Robby Ginepri for the Masters event in Rome, he broke his neck when he slipped on the clay and collided with the net post. Blake fractured his seventh vertebra, but did not sustain any nerve damage and was ultimately able to make a full recovery from the injury. In July, his father died of stomach cancer. At the same time, Blake developed shingles, which temporarily paralyzed half his face and blurred his vision.

=== 2005–2008 ===
==== 2005 ====
Blake's injuries and personal issues caused him to post relatively poor results for the first half of 2005. By April his ranking was 210. He decided to play the Challenger circuit, the "minor leagues" of tennis, in order to regain confidence and get more matches. In May he entered events in Tunica, Mississippi and Forest Hills, New York, and won both. He rejoined the ATP circuit and by August reached the final at the International Series event in Washington, D.C., where he fell to Roddick. He was given a wild card into AMS Cincinnati, drawing Federer in the first round. He then won the Pilot Pen Tennis tournament in New Haven, Connecticut, defeating Feliciano López in the final. After New Haven he was ranked 49.

Blake accepted a wildcard into the US Open. After defeating No. 2 Rafael Nadal in the round of 32, Blake beat Tommy Robredo in four sets to reach the quarterfinals where he faced Andre Agassi. The late-evening match is considered one of the greatest classics in the tournament's history. Blake was up two sets and a break in the third when Agassi made a comeback to eventually win in a fifth-set tiebreak. After the match Agassi said, "I wasn't the winner, tennis was". Later in October at the Stockholm Open, Blake won his third ATP tour title, defeating Srichaphan in the final. Blake finished 2005 ranked 22 in the world.

==== 2006 ====
At the beginning of 2006, Blake won the title at Sydney, taking his fourth ATP tour title defeating Russian Igor Andreev in the final. At the Australian Open he was seeded 20th, and despite losing in the third round to Spaniard Tommy Robredo he broke into the top 20 for the first time in his career. In March he beat Hewitt in the final at Las Vegas for his fifth ATP tour title. At the first AMS event of the year Indian Wells, Blake defeated Robredo in the third round and world No. 2 Nadal in the semifinals, reaching his first career ATP Masters Series singles final, losing in the final to Federer. By reaching the final, Blake became the first African-American man since Arthur Ashe to reach the world's top 10.

At the French Open he defeated Spaniard Nicolás Almagro in four sets in the second round, to become the last remaining American, and then was beaten by Frenchman Gaël Monfils in five sets. Beginning the grass court season at the Stella Artois Championships, he defeated Andy Roddick in the semifinals, losing to Lleyton Hewitt in the final. Ranked No. 5, Blake took part in the International Series at Indianapolis. He won the singles title, defeating Roddick (for the second time in 2006). At the US Open he reached the quarterfinals, losing to top seed and defending champion Roger Federer. In that match Blake won his first ever set against Federer, winning the third set in a tiebreaker 11–9.

In his debut appearance at the Thailand Open in Bangkok, Blake won his seventh singles title, defeating Jarkko Nieminen in the quarterfinals, Marat Safin in the semifinals, and Ivan Ljubičić (for the first time) in the final. Two weeks later Blake won his fifth title of 2006, defending his 2005 title in Stockholm, defeating Jarkko Nieminen. For the first time, Blake qualified for the Tennis Masters Cup in Shanghai. He went 2–1 in the Gold Group, defeating No. 2 Nadal and No. 3 Nikolay Davydenko, while losing to No. 6 Tommy Robredo. He qualified for the semifinals, beating defending champion David Nalbandian, losing the final to Federer. Blake finished 2006 at a career-high World Number 4 and as the highest-ranked American tennis player.

==== 2007 ====
In 2007 Blake won at the Sydney International for the second consecutive year. However, he then suffered a disappointing loss in the Round of 16 at the Australian Open, losing to tenth seed and eventual finalist Fernando González. In February, Blake made it to the final of the Delray Beach tournament, but lost it to the Belgian Xavier Malisse in three tight sets.

At the 2007 Tennis Channel Open in Las Vegas, as the defending champion, he was involved with a deep controversy. It was one of the several tournaments experimenting with the new round robin format, and Blake had lost his first match to Evgeny Korolev. Korolev lost his other match to Juan Martín del Potro. In order to advance to the quarterfinals, Blake had to defeat Del Potro in straight sets while losing five games or less. This would result in a three-way tie, with Blake losing the fewest games. With Blake leading 6–1, 3–1, Del Potro retired. This eliminated Del Potro from the three-way tie as he failed to complete one of his matches. Korolev then moved on to the next round, breaking the tie as he had defeated Blake in their direct match. Soon after, the organizers overruled the tournament guidelines, giving Blake a place in the quarterfinals. The following morning however, they changed the decision once again and as a result, Korolev re-advanced to the quarterfinals, while Blake was sent away from the tournament. Shortly after this incident, the ATP decided to cancel the round robin format, reverting any tournaments planning a round robin draw to the standard single-elimination draw.

During the summer hardcourt season, he advanced to his second career ATP Masters Series final. At AMS Cincinnati, he beat Alejandro Falla, Nicolas Kiefer, Juan Carlos Ferrero, Sam Querrey and Nikolay Davydenko en route to the final before falling to Roger Federer. He won the singles title at Penn Pilot in New Haven, Connecticut, and reached the final at Los Angeles, losing to Radek Štěpánek in three sets after having three set points in the first set. In the second round of the 2007 US Open, he won his first career five-set match against Fabrice Santoro. Blake made it to the fourth round, where he lost to No. 10 Tommy Haas in five sets, despite having match points in the fifth set. In September Blake and the rest of the US Davis Cup team defeated Sweden to reach the finals against Russia.

Blake lost in the third round of Paris to Richard Gasquet and thus finished outside the top eight players, losing his chance to defend the points he gained as finalist in the 2006 Tennis Masters Cup. In the 2007 Davis Cup finals Blake won his match against Mikhail Youzhny after Andy Roddick had beaten Dmitry Tursunov in the first rubber. The next day Bob and Mike Bryan won the doubles rubber over Igor Andreev and Nikolay Davydenko, sealing the Davis Cup win for the United States. Blake also defeated Tursunov in the last match of the finals to give Team USA 4–1 win.

==== 2008 ====
At the Australian Open, Blake defeated his first round opponent, Chilean Nicolás Massú. He then defeated compatriot Michael Russell. In the third round, he fought back from two sets down to beat French veteran Sébastien Grosjean who had beaten him in each of their three previous meetings. In the fourth round, Blake beat Marin Čilić in three sets to advance to the quarterfinals, his best showing yet down under. In the quarterfinal, Blake faced world No. 1 Roger Federer, and fell in straight sets. Although out of the Australian Open, Blake's ranking jumped back into the top 10 to No. 9 following his best performance in the tournament yet.

In Delray Beach, Blake made it to the final for the second consecutive year, but fell to No. 244 Kei Nishikori of Japan in three sets in the final. At the 2008 Pacific Life Open, Blake reached the quarter-finals before losing to Rafael Nadal in three sets. They met again in the next tournament at the 2008 Miami Masters also in the quarter-finals, and again Blake lost to Nadal in three sets. Blake then started the clay court season at the River Oaks International tournament in Houston, Texas. In his second ATP final of the year and his first career clay-court final, Blake fell to Spaniard Marcel Granollers.

In August 2008, Blake represented the United States as one of its three men's singles tennis players in the Beijing Olympics. In the quarterfinals, he gained one of the biggest wins of his career with his first ever win over Roger Federer 6–4, 7–6. At the time, Federer was ranked as the world's No. 1 men's player. His semifinal match was against Fernando González, the Men's Singles bronze medalist at the 2004 Olympics in Athens. Blake had a triple match point in the final set, but would go on to lose 11–9. He then lost the bronze medal match to Serbian Novak Djokovic.

In the US Open, Blake was stretched to a 5 set thriller against American teenager Donald Young in the first round. Blake easily won his second round match after Steve Darcis retired and then lost to friend and fellow American Mardy Fish in the third round in straight sets.

=== Later career ===
==== 2009 ====
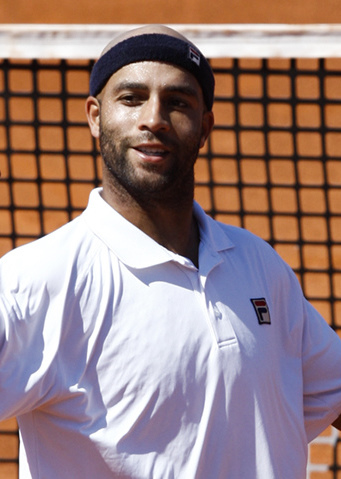
Blake in 2009

Blake defeated Frank Dancevic in the first round of the Australian Open. His success continued in the second round after deposing of Frenchman Sébastien de Chaunac in a match laden with spectator noise and bad line calls. Blake went on to face the 18th seed, Igor Andreev, in the third round and beat him. He lost in the fourth round in straight sets to the 2008 runner-up Jo-Wilfried Tsonga.

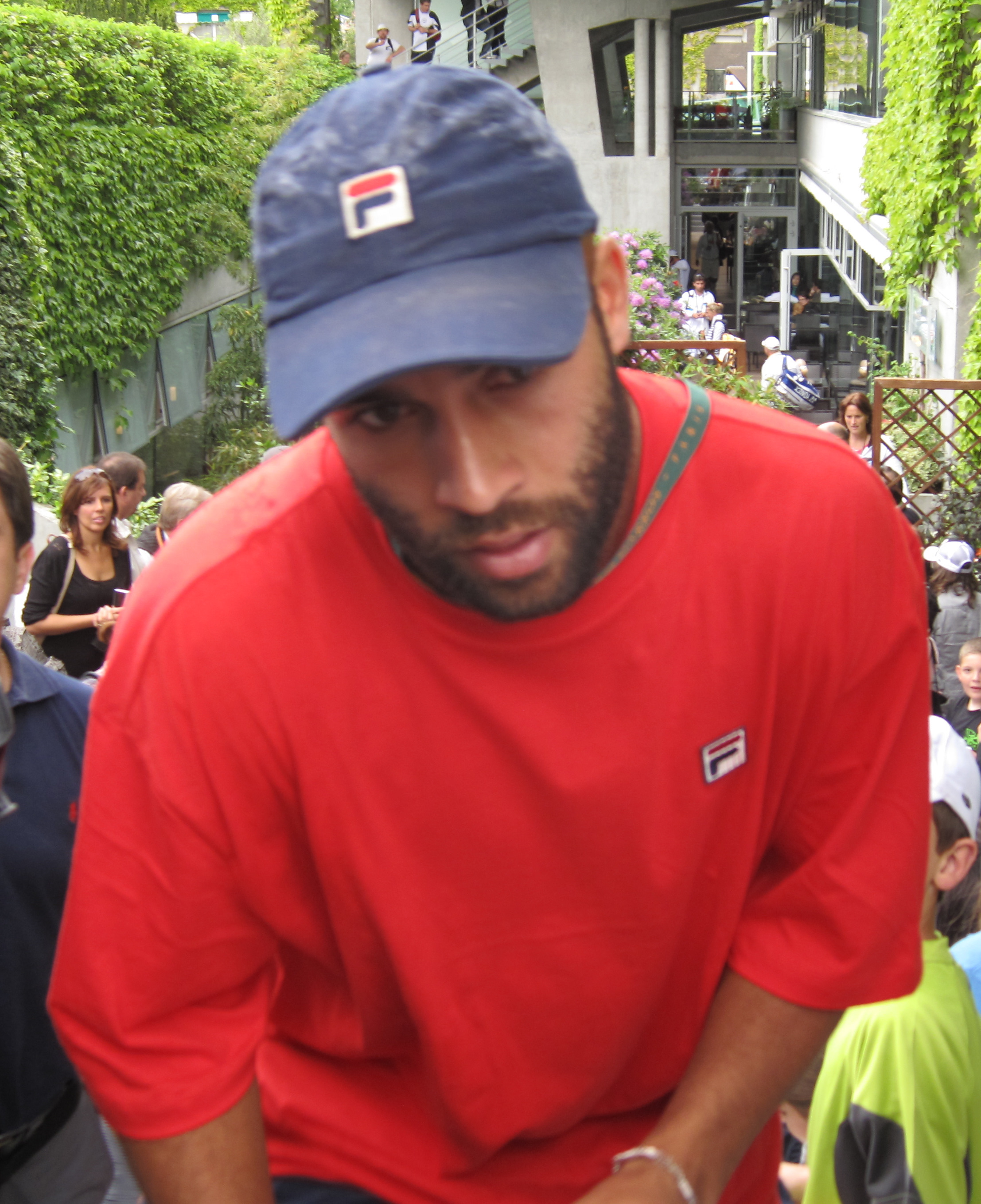
Blake at the 2009 French Open.

At the 2009 Estoril Open Blake advanced to his first clay-court final on European soil, after beating second seed and former Estoril Open champion Nikolay Davydenko in a rain-interrupted semi-final that was carried over due to bad light. Blake was defeated by Spain's Albert Montañés later that day in the finals. The 28-year-old Montanes saved two match points at 4–5 in the second set and fought back to beat fourth-seeded Blake in two hours and 14 minutes.

At the Aegon Championships at Queen's Club, Blake defeated Ivan Ljubičić, Sam Querrey, and Mikhail Youzhny to reach the semi-finals. He then reached the final after Andy Roddick retired with an ankle injury in the first set when the score was tied at 4 games all. He then went on to lose in the final to Andy Murray. After being eliminated in the first round of the singles, Blake partnered with compatriot Mardy Fish at the Wimbledon Men's Doubles. The Americans advanced to the semi-finals where they lost to defending champions Daniel Nestor and Nenad Zimonjić despite winning the first two sets.

Following a 3rd round loss at the 2009 US Open to Spain's Tommy Robredo, Blake split with longtime coach Brian Barker. He was replaced by Kelly Jones.

==== 2010 ====
At the 2010 Australian Open, Blake lost to fourth seed and US Open champion Juan Martín del Potro in the second round in five sets (8–10 final set). He then missed the clay court season due to a knee injury. Blake returned to action at Wimbledon, where he lost in the first round to Robin Haase, during which Blake accused ESPN commentator and former WTA player Pam Shriver of disrupting play due to her overly loud commentary from the box situated above the court behind him. This led to a verbal exchange between the two during the match. After the match, Blake declared that if his knee problems did not subside he would consider retirement. Blake, who refused to take any anti-inflammatories for his knee, called his performance "embarrassing" and said "I can't beat these guys at 80 percent." Despite these comments, Blake played the US Summer hard court season, and reached the third round of the 2010 US Open, where he lost to eventual finalist Novak Djokovic. Blake finished the year ranked outside the Top 100 for the first time since 2000.

==== 2011–2013 ====
Between the beginning of 2011–2013, Blake remained ranked outside the world's top 50, due to recurring injuries and loss of form. During the three seasons, he reached a single ATP-tour semifinal, at the 2011 Stockholm Open. At the US Open in August 2013, Blake announced his retirement. In 2019, he was elected to the Collegiate Hall of Fame.

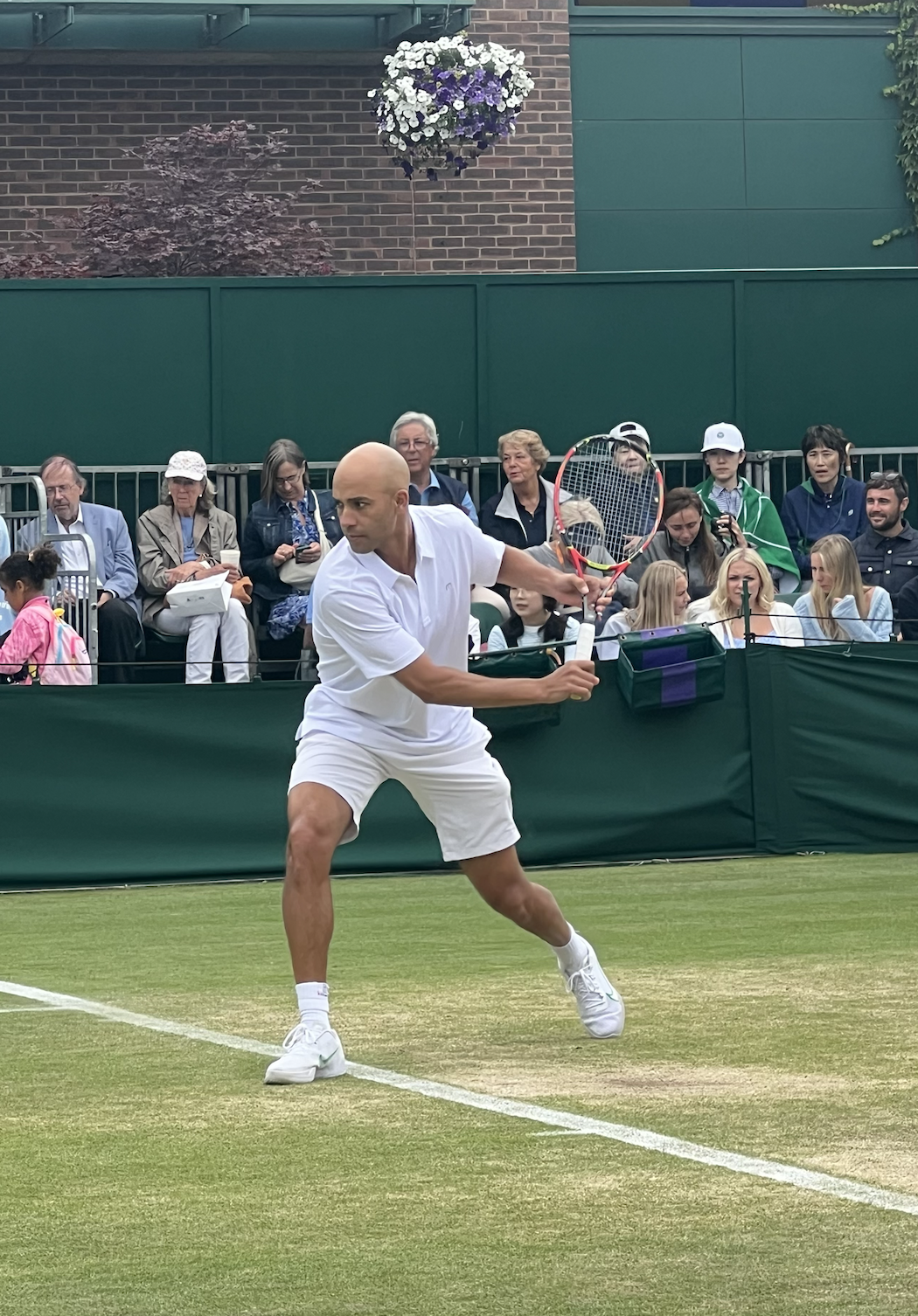
Blake playing in Wimbledon's Invitational Doubles tournament in 2023.

==== 2023 ====
James Blake returned to the tour in May 2023, after 10 years off the tour. Blake entered an M15 Rancho Santa Fe event in the doubles using a wildcard.

== Playing style ==
Blake was primarily an offensive baseliner. Blake was known for possessing one of the most powerful forehands in the game, with a solid transition game, and an effective serve and volley. Blake also possessed extremely quick footwork, although many claimed that he needed to work on changing direction. Blake's reputation as a "shotmaker," combined with potentially high-error flat groundstrokes made his style of play notably flashy, characterized by both a high number of winners and unforced errors. In turn, this made Blake's game somewhat streaky, as evidenced by his playing history.

== Equipment and endorsements ==
Blake worked with Prince to create a new racquet with Prince's O3 technology. However, he did not feel comfortable with this racquet. So, he switched back to the Dunlop Sport Aerogel 200, then the 4D 200, for the 2009 season. He changed to Wilson at the start of the 2010 season, using the new Six.One Tour strung with Luxilon Big Banger Alu Power 16L strings at high tension (60+ pounds). He did not feel comfortable with this racquet either. Therefore, he switched back to Dunlop again. After the US Open of 2010, he began to test out rackets for Head. As August 26, 2011, he announced he will use Donnay rackets as his choice and using a customized Donnay X-Dual Pro. His clothing sponsor is Fila, with whom he started working in 2009 after using Nike for most his career. He has his own clothing line named Thomas Reynolds Collection after his father.

Blake signed an endorsement deal with Evian in 2005 and his contract was extended in 2008.

== Personal life ==
Blake married publicist Emily Snider in Del Mar, California, in 2012. The couple have two daughters and live in Solana Beach.

Blake enjoys golf and basketball and is a fan of the New York Mets. He was featured on Bravo's second edition of Celebrity Poker Showdown but placed 2nd after losing to Maura Tierney.

Blake was also a red pro on Full Tilt Poker, though he has not been active there since shortly before Black Friday. He appeared in People magazine's Sexiest Man Alive issue. He is good friends with singer/songwriter John Mayer, who also attended Fairfield High School. When Blake was invited by Virginia's Anthem to do a cancer charity game honoring his late father, he invited Mayer, Andy Roddick, and Gavin DeGraw to perform.

=== 2015 NYPD incident ===
On September 9, 2015, Blake was thrown down to the sidewalk, handcuffed, and arrested by a plainclothes New York City Police Department officer in front of the Grand Hyatt New York after being mistaken for a suspect of interest. The officers were relying on a witness and photo of a suspect that looked similar to Blake: they mistook him for a credit-card fraud suspect staying in the same hotel. Commissioner William Bratton apologized for the mistake and stated the "arrest raised serious questions about [the officer's] actions" but denied allegations of racism. Blake sued, but withdrew his claim, saying he was not looking for financial compensation, "on the condition that the city establish a legal fellowship to investigate police misconduct and advocate for victims of brutality."

The violence of the arrest has prompted Blake to take a more active stand on police brutality against minorities. He met with Bratton and New York Mayor Bill de Blasio. He has also written a book, Ways of Grace: Stories of Activism, Adversity, and How Sports Can Bring Us Together, published in June 2017 that details the incident and his shift to activism as a result. Blake was subsequently sued for defamation by the officer who had mistakenly arrested Blake as the book portrayed the officer "as a racist and a goon". The lawsuit was dismissed by a judge in September 2018. In 2022, Blake recorded public service announcements for the US Open for MTANew York City Transit.

== Philanthropy ==
In 2008 Blake established The James Blake Foundation, which "invests vital seed money at the leading-edge of science: speed up the most promising work, and shortening the time it takes to turn lab discoveries into better treatments for patients." Since 2005, he has hosted Anthem Live!, a charity tennis exhibition and musical event in Virginia and New York City to raise money for cancer research. In July 2008, Blake established the Thomas Blake Sr. Memorial Research Fund to support cancer research at Memorial Sloan Kettering Cancer Center. The fund was named in memory of his father, who died from gastric cancer in 2004. Nike and Fila, which sponsored Blake, created T-shirts for Blake's charity, the J-Block program, and proceeds went to the Cancer Research Fund.

== Significant finals ==
=== Year-end championships finals ===
==== Singles: 1 (1 runner-up) ====
Outcome	Year	Tournament	Surface	Opponent	Score
Loss	2006	Shanghai	Hard (i)	(Switzerland) Roger Federer	0–6, 3–6, 4–6

=== Masters 1000 finals ===
==== Singles: 2 (2 runners-up) ====
Outcome	Year	Tournament	Surface	Opponent	Score
Loss	2006	Indian Wells	Hard	(Switzerland) Roger Federer	5–7, 3–6, 0–6
Loss	2007	Cincinnati	Hard	(Switzerland) Roger Federer	1–6, 4–6

==== Doubles: 1 (1 title) ====
Outcome	Year	Tournament	Surface	Partner	Opponents	Score
Win	2002	Cincinnati	Hard	(United States) Todd Martin	(India) Mahesh Bhupathi (Belarus) Max Mirnyi	7–5, 6–3

== ATP career finals ==
=== Singles: 24 (10 titles, 14 runners-up) ===
Legend Grand Slam tournaments (0–0) ATP World Tour Finals (0–1) ATP World Tour Masters 1000 (0–2) ATP World Tour 500 Series (1–1) ATP World Tour 250 Series (9–10)	Titles by surface Hard (10–9) Clay (0–2) Grass (0–3) Carpet (0–0)

Result	W/L	Date	Tournament	Surface	Opponent	Score
Loss	1.	Feb 2002	Memphis Open, Memphis, United States	Hard (i)	(United States) Andy Roddick	4–6, 6–3, 5–7
Loss	2.	Jul 2002	Hall of Fame Championships, Newport, United States	Grass	(United States) Taylor Dent	1–6, 6–4, 4–6
Win	1.	Aug 2002	Washington Open, Washington, United States	Hard	(Thailand) Paradorn Srichaphan	1–6, 7–6^{(7–5)}, 6–4
Loss	3.	Aug 2003	Long Island Open, Long Island, United States	Hard	(Thailand) Paradorn Srichaphan	2–6, 4–6
Loss	4.	Aug 2005	Washington Open, Washington, United States	Hard	(United States) Andy Roddick	5–7, 3–6
Win	2.	Aug 2005	Connecticut Open, New Haven, United States	Hard	(Spain) Feliciano López	3–6, 7–5, 6–1
Win	3.	Oct 2005	Stockholm Open, Stockholm, Sweden	Hard (i)	(Thailand) Paradorn Srichaphan	6–1, 7–6^{(8–6)}
Win	4.	Jan 2006	Sydney International, Sydney, Australia	Hard	(Russia) Igor Andreev	6–2, 3–6, 7–6^{(7–3)}
Win	5.	Feb 2006	Tennis Channel Open, Las Vegas, United States	Hard	(Australia) Lleyton Hewitt	7–5, 2–6, 6–3
Loss	5.	Mar 2006	Indian Wells Masters, Indian Wells, United States	Hard	(Switzerland) Roger Federer	5–7, 3–6, 0–6
Loss	6.	Jun 2006	Queen's Club Championships, London, United Kingdom	Grass	(Australia) Lleyton Hewitt	4–6, 4–6
Win	6.	Jul 2006	Indianapolis Tennis Championships, Indianapolis, USA	Hard	(United States) Andy Roddick	4–6, 6–4, 7–6^{(7–5)}
Win	7.	Sep 2006	Thailand Open, Bangkok, Thailand	Hard (i)	(Croatia) Ivan Ljubičić	6–3, 6–1
Win	8.	Oct 2006	Stockholm Open, Stockholm, Sweden (2)	Hard (i)	(Finland) Jarkko Nieminen	6–4, 6–2
Loss	7.	Nov 2006	Tennis Masters Cup, Shanghai, China	Hard (i)	(Switzerland) Roger Federer	0–6, 3–6, 4–6
Win	9.	Jan 2007	Sydney International, Sydney, Australia (2)	Hard	(Spain) Carlos Moyá	6–3, 5–7, 6–1
Loss	8.	Feb 2007	Delray Beach Open, Delray Beach, United States	Hard	(Belgium) Xavier Malisse	7–5, 4–6, 4–6
Loss	9.	Jul 2007	Los Angeles Open, Los Angeles, United States	Hard	(Czech Republic) Radek Štěpánek	6–7^{(7–9)}, 7–5, 2–6
Loss	10.	Aug 2007	Cincinnati Masters, Cincinnati, United States	Hard	(Switzerland) Roger Federer	1–6, 4–6
Win	10.	Aug 2007	Connecticut Open, New Haven, United States (2)	Hard	(United States) Mardy Fish	7–5, 6–4
Loss	11.	Feb 2008	Delray Beach Open, Delray Beach, United States	Hard	(Japan) Kei Nishikori	6–3, 1–6, 4–6
Loss	12.	Apr 2008	U.S. Men's Clay Court Championships, Houston, USA	Clay	(Spain) Marcel Granollers	4–6, 6–1, 5–7
Loss	13.	May 2009	Portugal Open, Estoril, Portugal	Clay	(Spain) Albert Montañés	7–5, 6–7^{(6–8)}, 0–6
Loss	14.	Jun 2009	Queen's Club Championships, London, United Kingdom (2)	Grass	(United Kingdom) Andy Murray	5–7, 4–6

=== Doubles: 10 (7 titles, 3 runners-up) ===
Legend Grand Slam tournaments (0–0) ATP World Tour Finals (0–0) ATP World Tour Masters 1000 (1–0) ATP World Tour 500 Series (0–2) ATP World Tour 250 Series (6–1)	Titles by surface Hard (4–2) Clay (3–0) Grass (0–0) Carpet (0–1)

Result	No.	Date	Tournament	Surface	Partner	Opponents	Score
Win	1.	Aug 2002	Cincinnati Masters, Cincinnati, United States	Hard	(United States) Todd Martin	(India) Mahesh Bhupathi (Belarus) Max Mirnyi	7–5, 6–3
Win	2.	Mar 2003	Tennis Channel Open, Scottsdale, United States	Hard	(The Bahamas) Mark Merklein	(Australia) Mark Philippoussis (Australia) Lleyton Hewitt	6–4, 6–7^{(2–7)}, 7–6^{(7–5)}
Win	3.	Feb 2004	SAP Open, San Jose, United States	Hard (i)	(United States) Mardy Fish	(United States) Rick Leach (United States) Brian MacPhie	6–2, 7–5
Win	4.	Apr 2004	U.S. Men's Clay Court Championships, Houston, United States	Clay	(United States) Mardy Fish	(United States) Rick Leach (United States) Brian MacPhie	6–3, 6–4
Win	5.	Apr 2004	BMW Open, Munich, Germany	Clay	(The Bahamas) Mark Merklein	(Austria) Julian Knowle (Serbia) Nenad Zimonjić	6–2, 6–4
Loss	1.	Feb 2006	U.S. National Indoor Championships, Memphis, United States	Hard (i)	(United States) Mardy Fish	(South Africa) Chris Haggard (Croatia) Ivo Karlović	6–0, 5–7, [5–10]
Loss	2.	Oct 2007	Swiss Indoors, Basel, Switzerland	Carpet	(The Bahamas) Mark Knowles	(United States) Bob Bryan (United States) Mike Bryan	1–6, 1–6
Win	6.	Apr 2012	U.S. Men's Clay Court Championships, Houston, United States (2)	Clay	(United States) Sam Querrey	(Philippines) Treat Conrad Huey (United Kingdom) Dominic Inglot	7–6^{(16–14)}, 6–4
Loss	3.	Feb 2013	U.S. National Indoor Championships, Memphis, United States	Hard (i)	(United States) Jack Sock	(United States) Bob Bryan (United States) Mike Bryan	1–6, 2–6
Win	7.	Mar 2013	Delray Beach Open, Delray Beach, United States	Hard	(United States) Jack Sock	(Belarus) Max Mirnyi (Romania) Horia Tecău	6–4, 6–4

=== Team tournaments: 3 (3–0) ===
Outcome	No.	Date	Tournament	Surface	Partner	Opponents	Score
Win	1.	Jan 2003	Hopman Cup, Perth, Western Australia	Hard	(United States) Serena Williams	(Australia) Alicia Molik (Australia) Lleyton Hewitt	3–0
Win	2.	Jan 2004	Hopman Cup, Perth, Western Australia	Hard	(United States) Lindsay Davenport	(Slovakia) Daniela Hantuchová (Slovakia) Karol Kučera	2–1
Win	3.	Nov – Dec 2007	Davis Cup, Portland, United States	Hard (i)	(United States) Bob Bryan (United States) Mike Bryan (United States) Andy Roddick	(Russia) Nikolay Davydenko (Russia) Mikhail Youzhny (Russia) Igor Andreev (Russia) Dmitry Tursunov	4–1

== Performance timelines ==
Key
W	F	SF	QF	#R	RR	Q#	P#	DNQ	A	Z#	PO	G	S	B	NMS	NTI	P	NH

(W) winner; (F) finalist; (SF) semifinalist; (QF) quarterfinalist; (#R) rounds 4, 3, 2, 1; (RR) round-robin stage; (Q#) qualification round; (P#) preliminary round; (DNQ) did not qualify; (A) absent; (Z#) Davis/Fed Cup Zonal Group (with number indication) or (PO) play-off; (G) gold, (S) silver or (B) bronze Olympic/Paralympic medal; (NMS) not a Masters tournament; (NTI) not a Tier I tournament; (P) postponed; (NH) not held; (SR) strike rate (events won / competed); (W–L) win–loss record.

=== Singles ===
Tournament	1999	2000	2001	2002	2003	2004	2005	2006	2007	2008	2009	2010	2011	2012	2013	W–L
Grand Slam tournaments
Australian Open	A	Q2	Q3	2R	4R	4R	2R	3R	4R	QF	4R	2R	A	A	Q2	21–9
French Open	A	A	Q2	2R	2R	A	2R	3R	1R	2R	1R	A	A	1R	1R	6–9
Wimbledon	A	Q1	Q1	2R	2R	A	1R	3R	3R	2R	1R	1R	1R	1R	2R	8–11
US Open	1R	Q2	2R	3R	3R	A	QF	QF	4R	3R	3R	3R	2R	3R	1R	25–13
Win–loss	0–1	0–0	1–1	5–4	7–4	3–1	6–4	10–4	8–4	8–4	5–4	3–3	1–2	2–3	2–3	61–42
ATP World Tour Finals
Tour Finals	Did not qualify							F	Did not qualify							3–2
Olympic Games
Summer Olympics	NH	A	Not Held			A	Not Held			4th	Not Held			A	NH	4–2
ATP Masters Series
Indian Wells Masters	A	1R	Q1	1R	QF	QF	3R	F	3R	QF	3R	3R	2R	A	2R	23–12
Miami Masters	A	Q1	Q2	4R	3R	1R	2R	QF	2R	QF	3R	2R	3R	1R	3R	17–12
Monte Carlo Masters	A	A	A	1R	2R	A	A	A	A	A	A	A	A	A	A	1–2
Rome Masters	A	A	A	QF	1R	1R	A	1R	2R	QF	1R	A	A	A	A	6–7
Hamburg Masters (Note: Held as Hamburg Masters (outdoor clay) until 2008, Madrid Masters (outdoor clay) 2009 onward.)	A	A	A	1R	1R	A	A	3R	3R	2R	3R	A	A	A	A	5–6
Canada Masters	A	A	A	2R	2R	A	A	2R	2R	QF	A	A	A	A	A	6–4
Cincinnati Masters	A	A	3R	2R	3R	A	1R	2R	F	3R	1R	1R	3R	2R	2R	16–12
Madrid Masters (Note: Held as Madrid Masters (indoor hard) from 2002 to 2008, and Shanghai Masters (outdoor hard) 2009 onward.)	A	A	A	1R	1R	A	A	2R	2R	2R	2R	A	A	A	A	3–7
Paris Masters	A	A	A	2R	2R	A	2R	3R	3R	SF	2R	A	A	A	A	8–7
Win–loss	0–0	0–1	2–1	9–9	9–9	4–3	4–4	13–8	10–7	12–8	6–7	3–3	5–3	1–2	3–2	82–67
Career statistics
Titles–Finals	0–0	0–0	0–0	1–3	0–1	0–0	2–3	5–8	2–5	0–2	0–2	0–0	0–0	0–0	0–0	10–24
Year-end ranking	220	212	73	28	37	97	23	4	13	10	44	135	59	127	153	

=== Doubles ===
Tournament	1999	2000	2001	2002	2003	2005	2009	2012	2013	W–L
Grand Slam tournaments
Australian Open	A	A	A	1R	3R	QF	A	A	A	5–3
French Open	A	A	A	2R	A	A	A	A	A	1–1
Wimbledon	A	1R	1R	3R	A	A	SF	1R	QF	9–6
US Open	1R	2R	2R	1R	A	A	A	1R	1R	2–6
Win–loss	0–1	1–2	1–2	3–4	2–1	3–1	4–1	0–2	3–2	17–16

== Top 10 wins ==
Season	1998	1999	2000	2001	2002	2003	2004	2005	2006	2007	2008	2009	2010	2011	2012	2013	Total
Wins	0	0	0	0	2	1	0	1	8	2	3	1	0	1	0	0	19

#	Player	Rank	Event	Surface	Rd	Score	Blake Rank
2002
1.	(Germany) Tommy Haas	5	Memphis, United States	Hard (i)	QF	6–3, 6–1	64
2.	(United States) Andre Agassi	6	Washington, D.C., United States	Hard	SF	6–3, 6–4	32
2003
3.	(Spain) Carlos Moyá	5	Indian Wells, United States	Hard	3R	5–7, 6–3, 6–2	25
2005
4.	(Spain) Rafael Nadal	2	US Open, New York, United States	Hard	3R	6–4, 4–6, 6–3, 6–1	49
2006
5.	(Russia) Nikolay Davydenko	6	Sydney, Australia	Hard	SF	6–4, 6–2	23
6.	(Australia) Lleyton Hewitt	10	Las Vegas, United States	Hard	F	7–5, 2–6, 6–3	21
7.	(Spain) Rafael Nadal	2	Indian Wells, United States	Hard	SF	7–5, 6–3	14
8.	(United States) Andy Roddick	5	Queen's Club, London, United Kingdom	Grass	SF	7–5, 6–4	7
9.	(Croatia) Ivan Ljubičić	3	Bangkok, Thailand	Hard (i)	F	6–3, 6–1	9
10.	(Spain) Rafael Nadal	2	Tennis Masters Cup, Shanghai, China	Hard (i)	RR	6–4, 7–6^{(7–0)}	8
11.	(Russia) Nikolay Davydenko	3	Tennis Masters Cup, Shanghai, China	Hard (i)	RR	2–6, 6–4, 7–5	8
12.	(Argentina) David Nalbandian	7	Tennis Masters Cup, Shanghai, China	Hard (i)	SF	6–4, 6–1	8
2007
13.	(Spain) Tommy Robredo	6	Davis Cup, Winston-Salem, United States	Hard (i)	RR	6–4, 6–3, 6–4	9
14.	(Russia) Nikolay Davydenko	5	Cincinnati, United States	Hard	SF	6–4, 6–2	8
2008
15.	(France) Richard Gasquet	8	Indian Wells, United States	Hard	4R	6–4, 6–2	9
16.	(France) Richard Gasquet	10	Davis Cup, Winston-Salem, United States	Hard (i)	RR	6–7^{(4–7)}, 6–4, 6–4	8
17.	(Switzerland) Roger Federer	1	Summer Olympics, Beijing, China	Hard	QF	6–4, 7–6^{(7–2)}	7
2009
18.	(United States) Andy Roddick	6	Queen's Club, London, United Kingdom	Grass	SF	4–4, ret.	16
2011
19.	(United States) Mardy Fish	9	Basel, Switzerland	Hard (i)	1R	0–1, ret.	60
