= Kamil Patel =

Former Mauritian tennis player

- Country (sports): Mauritius
- Born: 3 April 1979 (age 45)
- Prize money: $17,831

Singles
- Highest ranking: No. 570 (6 Dec 1999)

Doubles
- Highest ranking: No. 328 (28 Jan 2002)
Medal record
Indian Ocean Island Games
Gold medal – first place	1998 Réunion	Men's singles
Gold medal – first place	1998 Réunion	Men's doubles
Gold medal – first place	2003 Mauritius	Men's singles
Silver medal – second place	2003 Mauritius	Men's doubles
Silver medal – second place	2007 Madagascar	Mixed doubles
Bronze medal – third place	2007 Madagascar	Men's singles

Kamil Patel (born 3 April 1979) is a Mauritian former professional tennis player.

Patel, a three-time gold medalist at the Indian Ocean Island Games, played Davis Cup for Mauritius between 2000 and 2007, for a team record 18 career wins. In 2010 he represented Mauritius at the Commonwealth Games in both singles and mixed doubles, reaching the quarter-finals of the latter. While competing on the professional tour he had best rankings of 570 in singles and 328 in doubles. He won two ITF Futures titles in doubles.

Since 2013 he has served as president of the Mauritius Tennis Federation. He retired from competition after the 2015 Indian Ocean Island Games, where he served as the Mauritian flag bearer.

== ITF Futures titles ==
=== Doubles: (2) ===
No.	Date	Tournament	Surface	Partner	Opponents	Score
1.	Aug 1999	Morocco F3, Casablanca	Clay	(Morocco) Mounir El Aarej	(Croatia) Mirko Pehar (Germany) Andreas Weber	6–3, 7–5
2.	Oct 2001	France F22, Rodez	Hard	(France) Jean-Christophe Faurel	(France) Cyril Baudin (France) Arnaud Le Cloerec	6–3, 4–6, 6–3
