= Michael Russell (tennis) =

American tennis player (born 1978)

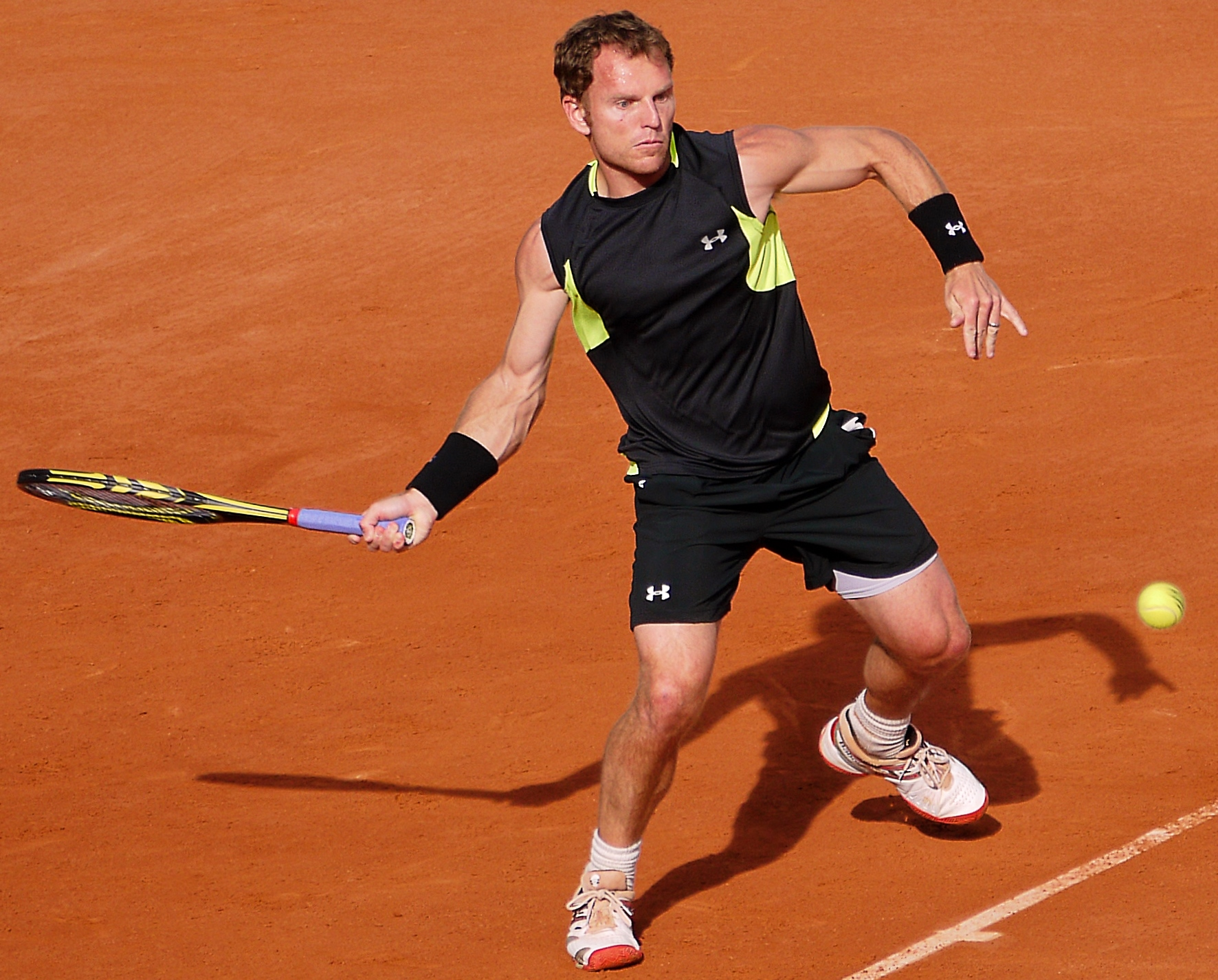
- Michael Russell (May 2011)
- Full name: Michael Craig Russell
- Country (sports): United States
- Residence: Houston, Texas, US
- Born: May 1, 1978 (age 48) Detroit, Michigan, US
- Height: 5 ft 8 in (1.73 m)
- Turned pro: 1998
- Retired: 2015
- Plays: Right-handed (two-handed backhand)
- College: Miami (FL)
- Prize money: $2,352,870

Singles
- Career record: 77–150
- Career titles: 0
- Highest ranking: No. 60 (August 13, 2007)

Grand Slam singles results
- Australian Open: 2R (2008, 2011)
- French Open: 4R (2001)
- Wimbledon: 2R (2010, 2012)
- US Open: 1R (1998, 2000, 2001, 2006, 2007, 2010, 2011, 2012, 2013)

Doubles
- Career record: 23–51
- Career titles: 0
- Highest ranking: No. 164 (June 11, 2012)

Grand Slam doubles results
- Australian Open: 1R (2010)
- French Open: 1R (2007, 2010, 2011, 2012)
- Wimbledon: 2R (2011)
- US Open: 3R (2015)

Coaching awards and records
- Awards 2024 ATP Coach of the Year

Michael Craig Russell (born May 1, 1978) is an American former professional tennis player, and tennis coach. He reached a career-high singles ranking of World No. 60 in August 2007. His 23 United States Tennis Association (USTA) Pro Circuit singles titles were the all-time record, as of November 2013. That month he became the American No. 3.

In 1994 Russell was ranked No. 1 in both singles and doubles in the USTA Boys' 16 rankings, and in 1996 he was ranked No. 1 in singles in the U.S. Boys' 18-Under. Playing for the University of Miami in 1996–97, he was named National Collegiate Athletic Association (NCAA) Rookie of the Year, before he turned pro in 1997. A high school valedictorian, Russell was one of few Association of Tennis Professionals (ATP) players in his time who had a college degree, having earned a B.S. from the University of Phoenix with a 3.94 grade point average.

Russell struggled with knee injuries for much of his professional career. He is perhaps best known for, on two occasions, holding surprise two-set leads in major tournaments against former major champions, before eventually being defeated both times. In the fourth round of the 2001 French Open (his best run at a major) against defending and eventual champion Gustavo Kuerten (as well as the contemporary world No. 1), Russell led two-sets-to love and 5–3 in the third set, and held a match point, but was defeated in five sets. In the 2007 Australian Open, he held a two-sets-to-love lead over former US Open and Wimbledon champion Lleyton Hewitt, before succumbing in five sets. Other career highlights include a fourth-round showing at the 2007 Indian Wells Masters event, a semifinal appearance at the 2012 U.S. Men's Clay Court Championships, and wins against top-10 players Mardy Fish and Tomáš Berdych. On the Challenger Tour, he finished his career at No. 8 in match wins (276) and tied for fifth in titles (15).

Russell started Michael Russell Tennis, a private tennis coaching business in 2015. He has coached Frances Tiafoe, Ryan Harrison, Sam Querrey, Taylor Fritz and Mackenzie McDonald through USTA Player Development.

== Personal life ==
Russell, who is Jewish, was born in Detroit, Michigan. He started playing tennis at age five with his father, George, who was formerly a member of the University of Michigan's Big Ten Conference 1965 championship team. His mother, Carole, also attended the University of Michigan, and is an English teacher. His older brother David played tennis at Princeton University, and attended Harvard Business School.

Russell grew up in Bloomfield Hills, Michigan, a Detroit suburb. He attended Birmingham Detroit Country Day School. He played soccer until his freshman year of high school.

In 1995, Russell was the valedictorian at Saddlebrook High School in Florida. He then attended the University of Miami in 1996–97.

Russell married his wife Lilly, a fitness competitor whom he had met in 2004, on November 10, 2007. His nicknames include "Mighty Mouse", "Spanky", "Wheels", and "Iron Mike".

He was one of the few Association of Tennis Professionals players while he played who had a college degree, having earned a Bachelor of Science in business administration from the University of Phoenix in January 2012. Russell graduated with Honors and a 3.94 grade point average. He reflected, "I was raised, as are most Jewish people, not to forego a university education."

== Tennis career ==
=== Junior career ===
In 1991, Russell lost in the finals of the 1991 USTA National Boys' 14 Indoor Championships. In 1993, he won the USTA National Boys' 16 Indoor Doubles Championship with Kevin Kim.

Russell finished 1994 ranked # 1 in both singles and doubles in the USTA Boys' 16 rankings. He won the 1994 USTA National Boys' 16 Championships, beating top-seeded Kevin Kim in the finals, and won the doubles title with Geoff Abrams. He lost in the finals of the 1994 USTA National Boys' 16 Clay Court Championships to Kevin Kim, and beat Bob Bryan in the semi-finals and Kim in the finals of the 1994 Easter Bowl Boys' 16s Championships.

In 1995, he won the singles title at the USTA National Boys' 18 Clay Court Championships, beating Kevin Kim in the finals, while losing in the doubles finals with Geoff Abrams. Russell reached the second round in singles and the quarterfinals in doubles with Kim at the 1995 Australian Open Junior Championships.

In 1996, he was ranked #1 in U.S. Boys' 18-Under. That year, Russell won the 1996 Easter Bowl boys' 18 championships, beating Bob Bryan in the finals, and won the doubles title with Kim at the 1996 Asunción Bowl in Asunción, Paraguay. He lost in the singles finals at the 1996 USTA National Boys' 18 Clay Court Championships to Bob Bryan. At the 1996 USTA National Boys' 18 Championships, he lost in the singles semifinals to Kevin Kim, and in the doubles final with Kim to Bob and Mike Bryan. He was a doubles quarterfinalist with Kim at the 1996 Wimbledon junior championships. He won the USTA Midwest Section 1996 Wallace R. Holzman Sr. Award.

=== College career ===
Russell played number one singles for the University of Miami in 1996–97. He was named 1997 NCAA Rookie of the Year and an All-American, and finished # 7 in collegiate rankings (and # 1 among freshmen), before he turned pro in 1997. His 39 singles match wins were a school record, and he was the first freshman since 1986 to win the Rolex National Intercollegiate Indoor Championships, defeating Fred Niemeyer in the finals. He was also named to the 1997 Rolex Collegiate All-Star Team, selected by the Intercollegiate Tennis Association and Tennis Magazine, and the Big East Championship Most Outstanding Player.

=== 1997–2002 ===
A week before he was to go pro in 1997, while serving to Andre Agassi during a 1997 practice session in North Carolina he suffered a spiral fracture of the humerus bone in his right arm. He spent the next five months rehabbing his arm. In 1997 Russell won USTA Satellite Circuit tournaments in Waco, Texas, Springfield, Missouri, and St. Joseph, Missouri.

In 1998, he won the singles title at the USTA Satellite in Mobile, Alabama. In 1999, Russell won USTA Futures events in Vero Beach, Florida, and Weston, Florida.

In 2000, Russell won the USTA Challenger in Amarillo, Texas, defeating Stefano Pescosolido in the finals, and won the doubles title with Tommy Robredo at the Edinburgh, Scotland, Challenger. He also won his first ATP match, defeating Hugo Armando in the first round of the U.S. Men's Clay Court Championships in Orlando, Florida. He was named a practice partner for the United States Davis Cup team for the U.S. vs. Spain Davis Cup semifinal in Santander, Spain.

In 2001, he finished ranked in the top 100 in the world. Russell won the singles and doubles, with Robert Kendrick, championships at the USTA Futures event in Mobile, Alabama. He became the first player to play his way into four consecutive Grand Slam events in succession through qualifiers (2000 Wimbledon, US Open; 2001 Australian Open, Roland Garros).

In his French Open debut, as a qualifier he advanced to the fourth round. There, he faced world # 1 Gustavo Kuerten, the defending champion, whom he beat in the first two sets. He had match point at 5–3 in the third set, and was serving. But Kuerten saved the match point at the end of a 26-stroke rally with a forehand winner that landed on the baseline. "It's unfortunate we have umpires", Russell joked, "because I would have called it out." Kuerten then came back to defeat Russell in the 205-minute match 3–6, 4–6, 7–6^{(7)}, 6–3, 6–1.

=== 2003–present ===
In 2003, Russell was hampered by a right knee injury for much of the year. He had arthroscopic surgery in May. Between 2003 and the following year he had three knee surgeries to address a condition that had been hampering him known as osteochondritis dissecans. It is a genetic disorder usually found in 16-year-olds, in which his bone and cartilage separated and broke off from the rest of his knee and femur. He ultimately required surgery on both his knees. His father said:

He reminds me of Don Quixote … [tilting] at those windmills. For every success, I can tell you, there's been hours on the couch with ice bags on his knees. After the third knee operation, most people would have thrown up their hands and said, 'I'm star-crossed, I can't do it.' But Michael has persevered. That's why he's our hero.

In 2004, he won singles titles at the USTA Futures event in Buffalo, New York, defeating Jorge Aguilar in the finals, at the USTA Futures event in Pittsburgh, and at the ITF Futures event in Quebec, Canada. In June 2005, Russell tore his right hamstring in a tournament in Ecuador. He spent four and a half months in rehab, and began taking courses at University of California, Berkeley by the internet. Flying home on a 20-hour flight from the qualifying for the 2006 Australian Open, he developed blood clots in both of his lungs. He had his problem treated with ten days of injections of the blood thinners Coumadin and Lovenox.

In 2007 he won a Challenger tournament in Nouméa, New Caledonia. Two weeks later, in the first round of the 2007 Australian Open, Russell led former # 1 player Lleyton Hewitt two sets to love on center court before succumbing. In the 2007 Indian Wells Masters event, he made it to the final 16 players in a 96-player field, after upsetting 11th seed – and 12th-ranked – Tomáš Berdych in round 2 in straight sets. In his first ten years as a pro tennis player he won approximately $750,000 in official prize money. But as sportswriter Greg Garber wrote in an ESPN article, after expenses, "In terms of net income, a minimum-wage worker at McDonald's did better financially than Russell did during the nine years before 2007."

On May 25, 2008, he was named USTA Circuit Player of the Week after winning three consecutive singles titles. In April 2010, he was at the age of 31 the third-oldest player in the men's top 75.

Russell made his first ATP semi-final at the 2012 U.S. Men's Clay Court Championships in Houston, Texas. He came through qualifying and beat top seed, world # 9 and compatriot Mardy Fish in straight sets on his way to a three-set loss to Juan Mónaco. The win against Fish was his first over a top-10 player. He ended the 2012 season as the third-oldest man in the ATP Top 100.

Russell, as a lucky loser, made it to the quarterfinals of the 2013 U.S. National Indoor Tennis Championships, losing to Denis Istomin in straight sets. In November 2013, he won an ATP Challenger in Charlottesville by coming back from 0–5 in the final set against Canadian Peter Polansky for the win.

The victory pushed him into the top 80 in the world rankings, and he became the third-highest-ranked American in the world. His 23 USTA Pro Circuit singles titles as of November 2013 was the all-time record. At the 2014 Rogers Cup in Toronto, he pushed David Ferrer to come up with his best tennis.

In 2015 at 36 years of age, Russell earned a spot representing premier American men's professional tennis at the Australian Open. He was later defeated in the first round of the Tournament in Melbourne. Annually, the Australian Open serves as the initial Grand Slam event in the (ITF) professional series.

Russell retired from professional tennis at the 2015 US Open, at 37 years of age. On the Challenger Tour, he finished his career at No. 8 in match wins (276) and tied for fifth in titles (15).

== Playing style ==
Russell has "startling acceleration, precise footwork and, most important, a voracious work ethic." He is a defensive counter-puncher, known for his foot speed, consistency, forehand, and fitness. John McEnroe described him as a particularly dogged competitor, saying that "no one's going to try harder on a tennis court than Michael Russell".

People questioned his potential when he was a junior because they thought he was too little for pro tennis. An ESPN article in 2007, noting that he was 5-foot-8 and weighed 160 pounds, called him: "one of the smallest players in the professional game."

== Coaching ==
In 2015, Russell started Michael Russell Tennis, a private tennis coaching business in Houston, Texas.

Russell has coached Frances Tiafoe, Ryan Harrison, Sam Querrey, Taylor Fritz, Mackenzie McDonald and Tennys Sandgren on the ATP WorldTour through USTA Player Development.

He is the current private coach of Taylor Fritz. In 2024, Russell was named Coach of the Year in the 2024 ATP Awards.

== ATP career finals ==
=== Doubles: 1 (0–1) ===
Legend Grand Slam Tournaments (0–0) ATP World Tour Finals (0–0) ATP World Tour Masters 1000 (0–0) ATP World Tour 500 Series (0–0) ATP World Tour 250 Series (0–1)	Titles by surface Hard (0–1) Clay (0–0) Grass (0–0) Carpet (0–0)

Outcome	W–L	Date	Tournament	Surface	Partner	Opponents	Score
Runner-up	0–1	Jul 2012	BB&T Atlanta Open, Atlanta, United States	Hard	(Belgium) Xavier Malisse	(Australia) Matthew Ebden (United States) Ryan Harrison	3–6, 6–3, [6–10]

== ATP Challenger finals ==
=== Singles: 21 (15 titles, 6 runners-up) ===
Legend Challenger (15–6)	Titles by surface Hard (13–5) Clay (2–1) Grass (0–0) Carpet (0–0)

Outcome	No.	Date	Tournament	Surface	Opponent	Score
Winner	1.	January 31, 2000	Amarillo, Texas, United States	Hard (i)	(Italy) Stefano Pescosolido	7–5, 6–2
Runner-up	1.	October 2, 2000	Austin, Texas, United States	Hard	(United States) Andy Roddick	4–6, 4–6
Runner-up	2.	April 2, 2001	Calabasas, California, United States	Hard	(Brazil) André Sá	2–6, 4–6
Winner	2.	July 12, 2004	Granby, Quebec, Canada	Hard	(Italy) Davide Sanguinetti	6–3, 6–2
Winner	3.	November 28, 2005	Orlando, Florida, United States	Hard	(United States) Todd Widom	6–4, 6–2
Winner	4.	August 14, 2006	Bronx, New York, United States	Hard	(Chile) Paul Capdeville	6–0, 6–2
Runner-up	3.	September 25, 2006	Tulsa, Oklahoma, USA	Hard	(United States) Bobby Reynolds	6–7^{(3–7)}, 3–6
Winner	5.	November 27, 2006	Maui, Hawaii, United States	Hard	(United States) Sam Warburg	6–1, 6–0
Winner	6.	January 1, 2007	Nouméa, New Caledonia, France	Hard	(France) David Guez	6–0, 6–1
Winner	7.	January 22, 2007	Waikoloa, Hawaii, United States	Hard	(United Kingdom) Jamie Baker	6–1, 7–5
Winner	8.	February 12, 2007	Joplin, Missouri, United States	Hard (i)	(Canada) Frédéric Niemeyer	6–4, 6–1
Runner-up	4.	January 12, 2009	São Paulo, Brazil	Hard	(Colombia) Santiago Giraldo	3–6, 2–6
Winner	9.	May 4, 2009	Savannah, Georgia, United States	Clay	(United States) Alex Kuznetsov	6–4, 7–6^{(8–6)}
Winner	10.	May 25, 2009	Carson, California, United States	Clay	(United States) Michael Yani	6–1, 6–1
Runner-up	5.	September 7, 2009	Alphen aan den Rijn, Netherlands	Clay	(France) Stéphane Robert	6–7^{(2–7)}, 7–5, 6–7^{(5–7)}
Runner-up	6.	October 19, 2009	Calabasas, California, United States	Hard	(United States) Donald Young	6–7^{(4–7)}, 1–6
Winner	11.	November 21, 2009	Champaign, Illinois, United States	Hard (i)	(United States) Taylor Dent	7–5, 6–4
Winner	12.	January 31, 2010	Honolulu, Hawaii, United States	Hard (i)	(Slovenia) Grega Žemlja	6–0, 6–3
Winner	13.	November 11, 2012	Knoxville, Tennessee, United States	Hard	(United States) Bobby Reynolds	6–3, 6–2
Winner	14.	July 6, 2013	Manta, Ecuador	Hard	(Australia) Greg Jones	4–6, 6–0, 7–5
Winner	15.	November 4, 2013	Charlottesville, Virginia, United States	Hard	(Canada) Peter Polansky	7–5, 2–6, 7–6^{(7–5)}

== Performance timelines ==
Key
W	F	SF	QF	#R	RR	Q#	DNQ	A	NH

(W) winner; (F) finalist; (SF) semifinalist; (QF) quarterfinalist; (#R) rounds 4, 3, 2, 1; (RR) round-robin stage; (Q#) qualification round; (DNQ) did not qualify; (A) absent; (NH) not held; (SR) strike rate (events won / competed); (W–L) win–loss record.

=== Singles ===
Tournament	1998	1999	2000	2001	2002	2003	2004	2005	2006	2007	2008	2009	2010	2011	2012	2013	2014	2015	SR	W–L	Win %
Grand Slam tournaments
Australian Open	A	A	A	1R	1R	A	A	A	A	1R	2R	A	1R	2R	1R	1R	1R	1R	0 / 10	2–10	16.67
French Open	A	A	A	4R	1R	A	A	A	A	1R	A	Q1	1R	1R	Q2	1R	1R	A	0 / 7	3–7	30.00
Wimbledon	A	A	1R	A	1R	A	A	A	A	1R	A	A	2R	1R	2R	1R	1R	A	0 / 8	2–8	20.00
US Open	1R	A	1R	1R	A	A	A	A	1R	1R	A	Q2	1R	1R	1R	1R	Q2	A	0 / 9	0–9	0.00
Win–loss	0–1	0–0	0–2	3–3	0–3	0–0	0–0	0–0	0–1	0–4	1–1	0–0	1–4	1–4	1–3	0–4	0–3	0–1	0 / 34	7–34	17.07
ATP World Tour Masters 1000
Indian Wells Masters	A	A	A	A	A	A	A	A	A	4R	A	2R	3R	2R	Q2	Q2	2R	Q2	0 / 5	8–5	61.54
Miami Masters	A	A	A	A	A	A	A	A	A	A	A	2R	2R	1R	Q2	Q1	Q1	A	0 / 3	2–3	40.00
Monte Carlo Masters	A	A	A	A	A	A	A	A	A	A	A	A	A	A	A	A	A	A	0 / 0	0–0	0.00
Rome Masters	A	A	A	A	A	A	A	A	A	Q1	A	A	Q1	A	A	A	A	A	0 / 0	0–0	0.00
Madrid Masters^{1}	A	A	A	A	A	A	A	A	A	Q2	A	A	1R	A	A	A	A	A	0 / 1	0–1	0.00
Canada Masters	1R	A	A	1R	A	A	A	A	A	2R	A	A	1R	2R	Q2	Q2	2R	A	0 / 6	3–6	33.33
Cincinnati Masters	A	A	A	1R	A	A	A	A	A	A	A	Q1	Q2	A	Q1	Q2	Q1	A	0 / 1	0–1	0.00
Shanghai Masters^{2}	A	A	A	A	A	A	A	A	A	A	A	A	Q1	A	A	1R	A	A	0 / 1	0–1	0.00
Paris Masters	A	A	A	A	A	A	A	A	A	A	A	A	1R	A	A	A	A	A	0 / 1	0–1	0.00
Win–loss	0–1	0–0	0–0	0–2	0–0	0–0	0–0	0–0	0–0	4–2	0–0	2–2	3–5	2–3	0–0	0–1	2–2	0–0	0 / 18	13–18	41.94
Career statistics
Titles–Finals	0–0	0–0	0–0	0–0	0–0	0–0	0–0	0–0	0–0	0–0	0–0	0–0	0–0	0–0	0–0	0–0	0–0	0–0	0 / 0	0–0	0.00
Year-end ranking	288	232	155	87	157	502	250	256	144	82	242	83	99	99	87	92	158	557	$2,452,569		

^{1} Held as Hamburg Masters (outdoor clay) until 2008, Madrid Masters (outdoor clay) 2009–present.
^{2} Held as Stuttgart Masters (indoor hard) until 2001, Madrid Masters (indoor hard) from 2002 to 2008, and Shanghai Masters (outdoor hard) 2009–present.

=== Doubles ===
Tournament	1998	1999	2000	2001	2002	2003	2004	2005	2006	2007	2008	2009	2010	2011	2012	2013	2014	2015	W–L
Grand Slam tournaments
Australian Open	A	A	A	A	A	A	A	A	A	A	A	A	1R	A	A	A	A	A	0–1
French Open	A	A	A	A	A	A	A	A	A	1R	A	A	1R	1R	1R	A	A	A	0–4
Wimbledon	A	A	A	A	A	A	A	A	A	1R	A	A	A	2R	1R	1R	A	A	1–4
US Open	1R	A	A	1R	A	A	A	A	A	A	A	A	1R	1R	1R	1R	2R	3R	3–8
Win–loss	0–1	0–0	0–0	0–1	0–0	0–0	0–0	0–0	0–0	0–2	0–0	0–0	0–3	1–3	0–3	0–2	1–1	2–1	4–17

== Top 10 wins ==
#	Player	Rank	Event	Surface	Rd	Score	MR Rank
2012
1.	(United States) Mardy Fish	9	Houston, United States	Clay	2R	6–3, 6–1	136

== Awards ==
- 2024 ATP Awards: Coach of the Year

== See also ==
- List of select Jewish tennis players

Awards and achievements
Preceded by (Australia) Darren Cahill (with (Italy) Simone Vagnozzi)	ATP Coach of the Year; 2024	Succeeded by (Spain) Juan Carlos Ferrero (with (Spain) Samuel López)
