= July 2012 in sports =

<<	July 2012					>>
Su	Mo	Tu	We	Th	Fr	Sa
1	2	3	4	5	6	7
8	9	10	11	12	13	14
15	16	17	18	19	20	21
22	23	24	25	26	27	28
29	30	31
Sports

This list shows notable sports-related deaths, events, and notable outcomes that occurred in July of 2012.

== Days of the month ==
=== 28 July 2012 (Saturday) ===
==== Rugby union ====
- Super Rugby Semifinals in Cape Town, Western Cape, South Africa: Stormers 19–26 **Sharks**

=== 27 July 2012 (Friday) ===
==== Rugby union ====
- Super Rugby Semifinals in Hamilton, Waikato, New Zealand: **Chiefs** 20–17 Crusaders

=== 23 July 2012 (Monday) ===
==== Baseball ====
- Nippon Professional Baseball All-Star Series:
  - Game 3 in Morioka, Iwate: Pacific League 6, Central League 2. **Central League win series 2–1**.
    - Hokkaido Nippon-Ham Fighters outfielder DaiKan Yoh is named game MVP with three hits and four RBIs, including a game-winning three-run home run in the 3rd inning.

=== 22 July 2012 (Sunday) ===
==== Equestrianism ====
- Show jumping: Royal International Horse Show in Hickstead, United Kingdom (CSIO 5*):
  - King Georges V Gold Cup: (gold) Hendrik-Jan Schuttert (NED) on Cerona (silver) Ludger Beerbaum (GER) on Chiara (bronze) Marie Hecart (FRA) on Myself de Breve

==== Sumo ====
- Nagoya basho (July grand tournament) in Nagoya, Aichi, Japan:
  - Harumafuji Kōhei defeats Hakuhō Shō to finish the tournament with a perfect 15–0 record, and wins his 3rd makuuchi (top division) championship.

=== 21 July 2012 (Saturday) ===
==== Baseball ====
- Nippon Professional Baseball All-Star Series:
  - Game 2 in Matsuyama, Ehime: Central League 4, Pacific League 0. Central League lead series 2–0.
    - Hiroshima Toyo Carp pitcher Kenta Maeda wins game MVP after pitching three scoreless innings with only one hit.

==== Equestrianism ====
- Show jumping: Global Champions Tour:
  - 8th competition in Chantilly (CSI 5*): (gold) Hans-Dieter Dreher (GER) on Magnus Romeo (silver) Beezie Madden (USA) on Simon (bronze) Karim El Zoghby (EGY) on Splendor

==== Mixed martial arts ====
- UFC 149 in Calgary, Alberta, Canada (USA unless stated):
  - Welterweight bout: **Matt Riddle** def. Chris Clements (CAN) via submission (arm-triangle choke)
  - Welterweight bout: **James Head** def. Brian Ebersole via split decision (29–28, 28–29, 29–28)
  - Heavyweight bout: **Cheick Kongo** (FRA) def. Shawn Jordan via unanimous decision (30–28, 30–27, 30–27)
  - Middleweight bout: **Tim Boetsch** def. Hector Lombard (CUB) via split decision (29–28, 28–29, 29–28)
  - Interim Bantamweight Championship bout: **Renan Barão** (BRA) def. Urijah Faber via unanimous decision (49–46, 50–45, 49–46)

==== Rugby union ====
- Super Rugby Qualifying finals:
  - In Christchurch, Canterbury, New Zealand: **Crusaders** 28–13 (South Africa) Bulls
  - In Brisbane, Queensland, Australia: Reds 17–30 (South Africa) **Sharks**

=== 20 July 2012 (Friday) ===
==== Baseball ====
- Nippon Professional Baseball All-Star Series:
  - Game 1 in Osaka: Central League 4, Pacific League 1. Central League lead series 1–0.
    - Yokohama DeNA BayStars third baseman Norihiro Nakamura is named game MVP after hitting a game-winning two-run home run in the 2nd inning.

==== Equestrianism ====
- Show jumping: FEI Nations Cup:
  - 7th competition: Nations Cup of the United Kingdom in Hickstead (CSIO 5*): (gold) Ireland (Shane Breen, Richie Moloney, Darragh Kerins, Clement McMahon) (silver) France (Eugénie Angot, Kevin Staut, Aymeric de Ponnat, Pénélope Leprevost) (bronze) Germany (Philipp Weishaupt, Holger Wulschner, Ludger Beerbaum, Marco Kutscher)

=== 15 July 2012 (Sunday) ===
==== Equestrianism ====
- Falsterbo Horse Show in Skanör med Falsterbo, Sweden:
  - Dressage (CDI 5*): Grand Prix Freestyle: (gold) Patrik Kittel (SWE) on Scandic (silver) Isabell Werth (GER) on El Santo NRW (bronze) Tinne Vilhelmson-Silfven (SWE) on Favourit
  - Show jumping (CSIO 5*): Grand Prix: (gold) Nicola Philippaerts (BEL) on Carlos (silver) Brianne Goutal (USA) on Nice de Prissey (bronze) Peder Fredricson (SWE) on Cash In

=== 14 July 2012 (Saturday) ===
==== Equestrianism ====
- Show jumping: Global Champions Tour:
  - 7th competition in Cascais (CSI 5*): (gold) Philipp Weishaupt (GER) on Leoville (silver) Michael Whitaker (GBR) on Viking (bronze) Ludger Beerbaum (GER) on Chaman

==== Mixed martial arts ====
- Strikeforce: Rockhold vs. Kennedy in Portland, Oregon, United States (USA unless stated):
  - Middleweight bout: **Lorenz Larkin** def. Robbie Lawler via unanimous decision (30–27, 30–27, 30–27)
  - Middleweight bout: **Roger Gracie** (BRA) def. Keith Jardine via unanimous decision (29–27, 30–27, 30–26)
  - Welterweight Championship bout: **Nate Marquardt** def. Tyron Woodley (c) via KO (elbows and punches)
  - Middleweight Championship bout: **Luke Rockhold** (c) def. Tim Kennedy via unanimous decision (49–46, 49–46, 49–46)

=== 13 July 2012 (Friday) ===
==== Equestrianism ====
- Show jumping: FEI Nations Cup:
  - 6th competition: FEI Nations Cup of Sweden in Skanör med Falsterbo (CSIO 5*): (gold) Sweden (Jens Fredricson, Malin Baryard-Johnsson, Henrik von Eckermann, Rolf-Göran Bengtsson) (silver) Great Britain (William Funnell, Alexandra Thornton, Tina Fletcher, Robert Smith) (bronze) France (Jerome Hurel, Aymeric de Ponnat, Marc Dilasser, Pénélope Leprevost)

=== 11 July 2012 (Wednesday) ===
==== Mixed martial arts ====
- UFC on Fuel TV: Munoz vs. Weidman in San Jose, California, United States:
  - Lightweight bout: **Rafael dos Anjos** (BRA) def. Anthony Njokuani (NGA) via unanimous decision (30–27, 30–27, 29–28)
  - Bantamweight bout: **T.J. Dillashaw** (USA) def. Vaughan Lee (ENG) via submission (rear-naked crank)
  - Middleweight bout: **Francis Carmont** (FRA) def. Karlos Vemola (CZE) via submission (rear-naked choke)
  - Welterweight bout: **Aaron Simpson** (USA) def. Kenny Robertson (USA) via unanimous decision (30–27, 29–28, 29–28)
  - Light Heavyweight bout: **James Te-Huna** (NZL) def. Joey Beltran (USA) via unanimous decision (30–26, 30–27, 30–27)
  - Middleweight bout: **Chris Weidman** (USA) def. Mark Muñoz (USA) via KO (elbow and punches)

=== 10 July 2012 (Tuesday) ===
==== Baseball ====
- Major League Baseball All-Star Game in Kansas City, Missouri: National League 8, American League 0.
  - The National League win the game for the third successive year, first time since 1994 to 1996. San Francisco Giants outfielder Melky Cabrera is named as Most Valuable Player, with two hits including a two-run homer in the fourth inning.

==== Basketball ====
- Stanković Continental Champions' Cup in Guangzhou, China:
  - Third place play-off: (bronze) **Tunisia** 80–51 Russia
  - Gold medal match: (gold) **China** 70–51 (silver) Australia

==== Chess ====
- World Rapid and Blitz Championships in Astana, Kazakhstan:
  - Rapid Chess: (gold) Sergey Karjakin (RUS) (silver) Magnus Carlsen (NOR) (bronze) Veselin Topalov (BUL)
  - Blitz Chess: (gold) Alexander Grischuk (RUS) (silver) Magnus Carlsen (NOR) (bronze) Sergey Karjakin (RUS)

==== Modern pentathlon ====
- Senior European Championships in Sofia, Bulgaria:
  - Men:
    - Individual: (gold) Riccardo de Luca (ITA) (silver) Róbert Kasza (HUN) (bronze) Bence Demeter (HUN)
    - Team: (gold) Bence Demeter / Róbert Kasza / Ádám Marosi (HUN) (silver) Ilia Frolov / Aleksander Lesun / Andrei Moiseev (RUS) (bronze) Delf Borrmann / Patrick Dogue / Alexander Nobis (GER)
    - Team relay: (gold) Ilia Frolov / Serguei Karyakin / Alexander Savkin (RUS) (silver) Pavlo Kirpulyanskyy / Ruslan Nakonechnyi / Oleksandr Mordasov (UKR) (bronze) Mikhail Mitsyk / Aliaksandr Vasilionak / Raman Pinchuk (BLR)
  - Women:
    - Individual: (gold) Laura Asadauskaitė (LTU) (silver) Iryna Khokhlova (UKR) (bronze) Ganna Buriak (UKR)
    - Team: (gold) Evdokia Gretchichnikova / Ekaterina Khuraskina / Donata Rimšaitė (RUS) (silver) Katy Burke / Heather Fell / Freyja Prentice (GBR) (bronze) Leila Gyenesei / Sarolta Kovács / Adrienn Tóth (HUN)
    - Team relay: (gold) Donata Rimšaitė / Anna Savchenko / Svetlana Lebedeva (RUS) (silver) Sylvia Gawlikowska / Katarzyna Wojcik / Aleksandra Skarzynska (POL) (bronze) Freyja Prentice / Heather Fell / Katy Burke (GBR)
  - Mixed:
    - Team relay: (gold) Anastasiya Prokopenko / Mihail Prokopenko (BLR) (silver) Laura Asadauskaitė / Justinas Kinderis (LTU) (bronze) Natalie Dianova / David Svoboda (CZE)

=== 9 July 2012 (Monday) ===
==== Baseball ====
- Major League Baseball Home Run Derby in Kansas City, Missouri: Detroit Tigers first baseman Prince Fielder defeats Toronto Blue Jays outfielder José Bautista in the finals, 12–7, to win the event.

==== Cycling ====
- Tour de France:

==== Motorsports ====
- 2012 Porsche Supercup season at the Silverstone Circuit, Great Britain:
  - (gold) René Rast (GER) (silver) Norbert Siedler (AUT) (bronze) Sean Edwards (GBR)

=== 8 July 2012 (Sunday) ===
==== Baseball ====
- All-Star Futures Game in Kansas City, Missouri: U.S. Futures 17, World Futures 5.
  - U.S. win the game for the third successive year and the eighth time overall. Detroit Tigers third baseman Nick Castellanos is named game MVP.

==== Basketball ====
- FIBA World Olympic Qualifying Tournament for Men in Caracas, Venezuela:
  - Third-place match: **Nigeria** 88–73 Dominican Republic
    - Nigeria qualify for 2012 Summer Olympics.
- Stanković Continental Champions' Cup in Guangzhou, China:
  - Group stage:
    - Tunisia 62–60 Australia
    - China 73–67 Russia

==== Cycling ====
- Tour de France:

==== Equestrianism ====
- CHIO in Aachen, Germany:
  - Dressage: Grand Prix Freestyle (CDIO 5*): (gold) Helen Langehanenberg (GER) with Damon Hill NRW (silver) Kristina Sprehe (GER) with Desperados (bronze) Dorothee Schneider (GER) with Diva Royal
  - Show jumping: Grand Prix of Aachen (CSIO 5*): (gold) Michael Whitaker (GBR) with Amai (silver) Thomas Voß (GER) with Carinjo (bronze) Meredith Michaels-Beerbaum (GER) with Bella Donna

==== Football (soccer) ====
- CAF Champions League Group stage Matchday 1:

==== Motorsports ====
- 2012 Formula Renault 2.0 NEC season at the Motorsport Arena Oschersleben, Germany:
  - (gold) Jake Dennis (GBR) (silver) Josh Hill (GBR) (bronze) Steijn Schothorst (NED)
- 2012 Australian Carrera Cup Championship at the Townsville Street Circuit, Australia:
  - (gold) Jonny Reid (AUS) (silver) Alex Davison (AUS) (bronze) Craig Baird (AUS)
- 2012 Australian Formula Ford Championship at the Townsville Street Circuit, Australia:
  - (gold) Jack Le Brocq (AUS) (silver) Matthew Hart (AUS) (bronze) Simon Hodge (AUS)
- 2012 Dunlop V8 Supercar Series at the Townsville Street Circuit, Australia:
  - (gold) Nick Percat (AUS) (silver) Scott McLaughlin (AUS) (bronze) Chaz Mostert (AUS)
- 2012 International V8 Supercars Championship at the Townsville Street Circuit, Australia:
  - (gold) Jamie Whincup (AUS) (silver) Craig Lowndes (AUS) (bronze) Will Davison (AUS)
- 2012 British Superbike Championship season at Oulton Park, England:
  - Race 1: (gold) Tommy Hill (ENG) (silver) Josh Brookes (AUS) (bronze) Shane Byrne (ENG)
- 2012 British Superbike Championship season at Oulton Park, England:
  - Race 2: (gold) Tommy Hill (ENG) (silver) Shane Byrne (ENG) (bronze) Josh Brookes (AUS)
- 2012 Formula Abarth season at the Misano World Circuit, Italy:
  - Race 1: (gold) Nicolas Costa (BRA) (silver) Emanuele Zonzini (SMR) (bronze) Santiago Urrutia (URU)
- 2012 Formula Abarth season at the Misano World Circuit, Italy:
  - Race 2: (gold) Nicolas Costa (BRA) (silver) Bruno Bonifacio (BRA) (bronze) Kevin Jörg (SUI)
- 2012 German Formula Three season at the Motorsport Arena Oschersleben, Germany:
  - (gold) Jimmy Eriksson (SWE) (silver) Lucas Auer (AUT) (bronze) Artem Markelov (RUS)
- 2012 GP2 Series season at the Silverstone Circuit, Great Britain:
  - (gold) Luiz Razia (BRA) (silver) Davide Valsecchi (ITA) (bronze) Felipe Nasr (BRA)
- 2012 GP3 Series season at the Silverstone Circuit, Great Britain:
  - (gold) William Buller (GBR) (silver) Conor Daly (USA) (bronze) Patric Niederhauser (SUI)
- 2012 Copa Fiat Brasil season at the Autódromo Internacional Ayrton Senna, Brazil:
  - Race 1: (gold) Christian Fittipaldi (BRA) (silver) Cacá Bueno (BRA) (bronze) Edson do Valle (BRA)
  - Race 2: (gold) Christian Fittipaldi (BRA) (silver) Popó Beuno (BRA) (bronze) Giuliano Losacco (BRA)
- 2012 FIA GT1 World Championship season at the Autódromo Internacional do Algarve, Portugal:
  - Race 1: (gold) Marc Basseng / Markus Winkelhock (GER) (silver) Michael Bartels (GER) / Yelmer Buurman (NED) (bronze) Oliver Jarvis (GBR) / Frank Stippler (GER)
  - Race 2: (gold) Thomas Jäger (GER) / Nicky Pastorelli (NED) (silver) Mark Basseng / Markus Winkelhock (GER) (bronze) Stef Dusseldorp (NED) / Frédéric Makowiecki (FRA)
- 2012 FIA GT3 European Championship season at the Autódromo Internacional do Algarve, Portugal:
  - Race 1: (gold) Dominik Baumann (AUT) / Maximilian Buhk (GER) (silver) Mika Vähämäki (FIN) / Max Nilsson (SWE) (bronze) David Mengesdorf (GER) / Hari Proczyk (AUT)
  - Race 2: (gold) David Mengesdorf (GER) / Hari Proczyk (AUT) (silver) Ni Amorim / César Campaniço (POR) (bronze) Gaetano Ardagna Pérez (VEN) / Giuseppe Cirò (ITA)
- 2012 Formula One season at the Silverstone Circuit, Great Britain:
  - (gold) Mark Webber (AUS) (silver) Fernando Alonso (ESP) (bronze) Sebastian Vettel (GER)
- 2012 Fórmula Truck season at the Autódromo José Carlos Pace, Brazil:
  - (gold) Leandro Totti (BRA) (silver) Roberval Andrade (BRA) (bronze) Adalberto Jardim (BRA)
- 2012 Grand Prix motorcycle racing season – Moto GP at the Sachsenring, Germany:
  - (gold) Dani Pedrosa (ESP) (silver) Jorge Lorenzo (ESP) (bronze) Andrea Dovizioso (ITA)
- 2012 Grand Prix motorcycle racing season – Moto 2 at the Sachsenring, Germany:
  - (gold) Marc Márquez (ESP) (silver) Mika Kallio (FIN) (bronze) Alex de Angelis (SMR)
- 2012 Grand Prix motorcycle racing season – Moto 3 at the Sachsenring, Germany:
  - (gold) Sandro Cortese (GER) (silver) Alexis Masbou (FRA) (bronze) Luis Salom (ESP)
- 2012 IndyCar Series season at the Streets of Toronto, Canada:
  - (gold) Ryan Hunter-Reay (USA) (silver) Charlie Kimball (USA) (bronze) Mike Conway (GBR)
- 2012 NASCAR Stock V6 Series at the Autódromo Hermanos Rodríguez, Mexico:
  - (gold) Oscar Torres Jr. (MEX) (silver) Javier Campos (MEX) (bronze) Erik Mondragón (MEX)

==== Tennis ====
- Wimbledon Championships in London, Great Britain, day 13:
  - Men's singles final: **Roger Federer (SUI)** [3] def. Andy Murray (GBR) [4] 4−6, 7−5, 6–3, 6–4
    - Federer wins his seventh Wimbledon title and 17th Grand Slam title overall.
  - Mixed doubles final: **Mike Bryan (USA) / Lisa Raymond (USA)** [2] def. Leander Paes (IND) / Elena Vesnina (RUS) [4] 6–3, 5–7, 6–4

==== Volleyball ====
- FIVB World League Final round in Sofia, Bulgaria:
  - Third place match: Bulgaria 2–3 (bronze) **Cuba**
  - Final: (gold) **Poland** 3–0 (silver) United States

=== 7 July 2012 (Saturday) ===
==== Basketball ====
- FIBA World Olympic Qualifying Tournament for Men in Caracas, Venezuela:
  - Semifinals: (winners qualify for 2012 Summer Olympics)
    - **Russia** 85–77 Nigeria
    - **Lithuania** 109–83 Dominican Republic
- Stanković Continental Champions' Cup in Guangzhou, China:
  - Group stage:
    - Russia 63–53 Tunisia
    - China 67–44 Australia

==== Cricket ====
- Australia in England:
  - 4th ODI in Chester-le-Street: Australia 200/9 (50 overs), England 201/2 (47.5 overs). England win by 8 wickets and lead the 5-match series 3–0.
- New Zealand in the West Indies:
  - 2nd ODI in Kingston: West Indies 315/5 (50 overs), New Zealand 260 (47 overs). West Indies win by 55 runs and lead the 5-match series 2–0.

==== Cycling ====
- Tour de France:
  - Stage 7: (gold) Chris Froome (GBR) (Team Sky) (silver) Cadel Evans (AUS) (BMC Racing Team) (bronze) Bradley Wiggins (GBR) (Team Sky)
  - General classification: Wiggins (silver) Evans (bronze) Vincenzo Nibali (ITA) (Liquigas–Cannondale)
  - Points: Peter Sagan (SVK) (Liquigas–Cannondale), Mountains: Froome, Young: Rein Taaramäe (EST) (Cofidis), Team: Team Sky (GBR), Combat: Luis León Sánchez (ESP) (Rabobank)

==== Equestrianism ====
- Eventing: FEI Nations Cup:
  - 4th competition:
    - Team result: FEI Nations Cup of Germany in Aachen (CICO 3*): (gold) Germany (Sandra Auffarth, Dirk Schrade, Michael Jung, Ingrid Klimke) (silver) Great Britain (Laura Collett, William Fox-Pitt, Francis Whittington, Emily Baldwin) (bronze) Sweden (Ludwig Svennerstål, Niklas Jonsson, Hannes Melin)
    - Individual result: (gold) Christopher Burton (AUS) with Underdiscussion (silver) Michael Jung (GER) with Sam FBW (bronze) Laura Collett (GBR) with Rayef

==== Football (soccer) ====
- CAF Champions League Group stage Matchday 1:
  - Group A: ASO Chlef (Algeria) – (Tunisia) Étoile du Sahel
  - Group B: Berekum Chelsea (Ghana) – (Egypt) Zamalek

==== Mixed martial arts ====
- UFC 148 in Las Vegas, Nevada, United States (USA unless stated):
  - Bantamweight bout: **Mike Easton** def. Ivan Menjivar (SLV) via unanimous decision (30–27, 29–28, 30–27)
  - Featherweight bout: **Chad Mendes** def. Cody McKenzie via TKO (punches)
  - Welterweight bout: **Demian Maia** (BRA) def. Dong Hyun Kim (KOR) via TKO (rib injury)
  - Middleweight bout: **Cung Le** def. Patrick Côté (CAN) via unanimous decision (30–27, 30–27, 30–27)
  - Light Heavyweight bout: **Forrest Griffin** def. Tito Ortiz via unanimous decision (29–28, 29–28, 29–28)
  - Middleweight Championship bout: **Anderson Silva** (BRA) (c) def. Chael Sonnen via TKO (punches)

==== Motorsports ====
- 2012 Formula Renault 2.0 NEC season at the Motorsport Arena Oschersleben, Germany:
  - Race 1: (gold) Josh Hill (GBR) (silver) Jordan King (GBR) (bronze) Jake Dennis (GBR)
- 2012 Formula Renault 2.0 NEC season at the Motorsport Arena Oschersleben, Germany:
  - Race 2: (gold) Josh Hill (GBR) (silver) Jordan King (GBR) (bronze) Alessio Picariello (BEL)
- 2012 Intercontinental Rally Challenge season in San Marino:
  - (gold) Giandomenico Basso (ITA) (silver) Andreas Mikkelsen (NOR) (bronze) Umberto Scandola (ITA)
- 2012 Australian Carrera Cup Championship at the Townsville Street Circuit, Australia:
  - (gold) Jonny Reid (AUS) (silver) Craig Baird (AUS) (bronze) Alex Davison (AUS)
- 2012 Dunlop V8 Supercar Series at the Townsville Street Circuit, Australia:
  - (gold) Scott McLaughlin (AUS) (silver) George Miedecke (AUS) (bronze) Nick Percat (AUS)
- 2012 International V8 Supercars Championship at the Townsville Street Circuit, Australia:
  - (gold) Jamie Whincup (AUS) (silver) Mark Winterbottom (AUS) (bronze) Garth Tander (AUS)
- 2012 Indy Lights season at the Streets of Toronto, Canada:
  - (gold) Gustavo Yacamán (COL) (silver) Sebastián Saavedra (COL) (bronze) Victor Carbone (BRA)
- 2012 NASCAR Sprint Cup Series at the Daytona International Speedway, United States:
  - (gold) Tony Stewart (USA) (silver) Jeff Burton (USA) (bronze) Matt Kenseth (USA)
- 2012 NASCAR Toyota Series season at the Autódromo Hermanos Rodríguez, Mexico:
  - (gold) Hugo Oliveiras (MEX) (silver) Rogelio López (MEX) (bronze) Abraham Calderón (MEX)
- 2012 British Superbike Championship season at Oulton Park, England:
  - (gold) Tommy Hill (ENG) (silver) Josh Brookes (AUS) (bronze) Shane Byrne (ENG)
- 2012 Formula Abarth season at the Misano World Circuit, Italy:
  - (gold) Luca Ghiotto (ITA) (silver) Bruno Bonifacio (BRA) (bronze) Nicolas Costa (BRA)
- 2012 German Formula Three season at the Motorsport Arena Oschersleben, Germany:
  - Race 1: (gold) Jimmy Eriksson (SWE) (silver) Mitchell Gilbert (AUS) (bronze) Tom Blomqvist (GBR)
- 2012 German Formula Three season at the Motorsport Arena Oschersleben, Germany:
  - Race 2: (gold) Kimiya Sato (JPN) (silver) Yannick Mettler (SUI) (bronze) Jimmy Eriksson (SWE)
- 2012 GP2 Series season at the Silverstone Circuit, Great Britain:
  - (gold) Esteban Gutiérrez (MEX) (silver) Johnny Cecotto Jr. (VEN) (bronze) Jolyon Palmer (GBR)
- 2012 GP3 Series season at the Silverstone Circuit, Great Britain:
  - (gold) António Félix da Costa (POR) (silver) Mitch Evans (NZL) (bronze) Aaro Vainio (FIN)

==== Tennis ====
- Wimbledon Championships in London, Great Britain, day 12:
  - Women's singles final: **Serena Williams (USA)** [6] def. Agnieszka Radwańska (POL) [3] 6–1, 5–7, 6–2
    - Williams wins her fifth Wimbledon singles title, and her 14th Grand Slam singles title overall.
  - Men's doubles final: **Jonathan Marray (GBR) / Frederik Nielsen (DEN)** [WC] def. Robert Lindstedt (SWE) / Horia Tecău (ROU) [5] 4–6, 6–4, 7–6(7–5), 6–7(5–7), 6–3
    - Marray and Nielsen win their first title. Marray becomes the first British man to win a Wimbledon seniors title since 1936.
  - Women's doubles final: **Serena Williams (USA) / Venus Williams (USA)** def. Andrea Hlaváčková (CZE) / Lucie Hradecká (CZE) [6] 7–5, 6–4
    - The Williams sisters win their fifth Wimbledon doubles title, and their 13th Grand Slam doubles title overall.

==== Volleyball ====
- FIVB World League Final round in Sofia, Bulgaria:
  - Semifinals:
    - **United States** 3–0 Cuba
    - **Poland** 3–0 Bulgaria

=== 6 July 2012 (Friday) ===
==== Athletics ====
- IAAF Diamond League:
  - Meeting Areva in Saint-Denis, France:

==== Basketball ====
- FIBA World Olympic Qualifying Tournament for Men in Caracas, Venezuela:
  - Quarterfinals:
    - **Russia** 80–65 Angola
    - Greece 79–80 **Nigeria**
    - Puerto Rico 72–76 **Lithuania**
    - **Dominican Republic** 86–76 North Macedonia
- Stanković Continental Champions' Cup in Guangzhou, China:
  - Group Stage:
    - China 85–54 Tunisia
    - Russia 61–76 Australia

==== Cycling ====
- Tour de France:
  - Stage 6: (gold) Peter Sagan (SVK) (silver) André Greipel (GER) (bronze) Matthew Goss (AUS)
  - General classification: Fabian Cancellara (SUI) (silver) Bradley Wiggins (GBR) (bronze) Sylvain Chavanel (FRA)
  - Points: Peter Sagan (SVK), Mountains: Michael Mørkøv (DEN), Young: Tejay van Garderen (USA), Team: Team Sky (GBR), Combat: David Zabriskie (USA)
- Tour of Austria:
  - Stage 6: (gold) Sacha Modolo (ITA) (silver) Daniele Colli (ITA) (bronze) Danilo Napolitano (ITA)
  - General classification: Jakob Fuglsang (DEN)
- Course de Solidarność et des Champions Olympiques:
  - Stage 4: (gold) Adrian Honkisz (POL) (silver) Matej Mugerli (SLO) (bronze) Luc Hagenaars (NED)
  - General classification: Marko Kump (SLO)

==== Football (soccer) ====
- Arab Nations Cup in Saudi Arabia:
  - Final: (silver) Libya 1–1 (1–3 Pen.) (gold) **Morocco**
- UEFA European Under-19 Football Championship in Tallinn, Estonia:
  - Group A:
    - Estonia 1–4 Greece
    - Portugal 3–3 Spain
  - Group B:
    - France 1–0 Croatia
    - Serbia 1–2 England

==== Motorsports ====
- 2012 NASCAR Nationwide Series at the Daytona International Speedway, United States:
  - (gold) Kurt Busch (USA) (silver) Ricky Stenhouse Jr. (USA) (bronze) Michael Annett (USA)
- 2012 Australian Carrera Cup Championship at the Townsville Street Circuit, Australia:
  - (gold) Alex Davison (AUS) (silver) Jonny Reid (AUS) (bronze) Craig Baird (AUS)
- 2012 Dunlop V8 Supercar Series at the Townsville Street Circuit, Australia:
  - (gold) Scott McLaughlin (AUS) (silver) Nick Percat (AUS) (bronze) Chaz Mostert (AUS)

==== Tennis ====
- Wimbledon Championships in London, Great Britain, day 11:
  - Men's Singles semifinals:
    - **Roger Federer (SUI) [3]** def. Novak Djokovic (SRB) [1] 6–3, 3–6, 6–4, 6–3
    - **Andy Murray (GBR) [4]** def. Jo-Wilfried Tsonga (FRA) [5] 6–3, 6–4, 3–6, 7–5

==== Volleyball ====
- FIVB World League Final round in Sofia, Bulgaria:
  - Pool E: United States 3–0 Bulgaria
  - Pool F: Poland 3–0 Cuba

=== 5 July 2012 (Thursday) ===
==== Cycling ====
- Tour de France:
  - Stage 5: (gold) André Greipel (GER) (silver) Matthew Goss (AUS) (bronze) Juan José Haedo (ARG)
  - General classification: Fabian Cancellara (SUI) (silver) Bradley Wiggins (GBR) (bronze) Sylvain Chavanel (FRA)
  - Points: Peter Sagan (SVK), Mountains: Michael Mørkøv (DEN), Young: Tejay van Garderen (USA), Team: Team Sky (GBR), Combat: Mathieu Ladagnous (FRA)
- Tour of Qinghai Lake:
  - Stage 7: (gold) Aldo Ino Ilesic (SLO) (silver) Jake Keough (USA) (bronze) Cristian Benenati (ITA)
  - General classification: Hossein Alizadeh (IRI)
- Tour of Austria:
  - Stage 5: (gold) Fabio Taborre (ITA) (silver) Marco Bandiera (ITA) (bronze) Matthias Brändle (AUT)
  - General classification: Jakob Fuglsang (DEN)
- Course de Solidarność et des Champions Olympiques:
  - Stage 3: (gold) André Schulze (GER) (silver) Andrea Palini (ITA) (bronze) Marko Kump (SLO)
  - General classification: André Schulze (GER)
- Giro d'Italia Femminile:
  - Stage 7: (gold) Marianne Vos (NED) (silver) Emma Johansson (SWE) (bronze) Fabiana Luperini (ITA)
  - General classification: Marianne Vos (NED)
- Tour de Feminin:
  - Stage 1: (gold) Larisa Pankova (RUS) (silver) Rozanne Slik (NED) (bronze) Kirsten Wild (NED)
  - General classification: Larisa Pankova (RUS)

==== Cricket ====
- ICC World Cricket League Championship in Dublin, Ireland:
  - Ireland 163 (47 overs); Afghanistan 104 (33.1 overs). Ireland win by 59 runs.

==== Equestrianism ====
- Show jumping: FEI Nations Cup:
  - 5th competition: FEI Nations Cup of Germany in Aachen (CSIO 5*): (gold) France (Eugénie Angot, Roger-Yves Bost, Pénélope Leprevost, Olivier Guillon) (silver) Germany (Marcus Ehning, Christian Ahlmann, Janne Friederike Meyer, Marco Kutscher) (bronze) Ireland (Denis Lynch, Dermott Lennon, Billy Twomey, Cian O'Connor)

==== Football (soccer) ====
- UEFA Europa League First qualifying round, first leg:
  - Khazar Lankaran (AZE) 2–2 Nõmme Kalju (EST)
  - Narva Trans (EST) 0–5 Inter Baku (AZE)
  - Renova (MKD) 4–0 Libertas (SMR)
  - Jagodina (SRB) 0–1 Ordabasy (KAZ)
  - KuPS (FIN) 2–1 Llanelli (WAL)
  - Levadia Tallinn (EST) 1–0 Šiauliai (LTU)
  - Baku (AZE) 0–0 Mura 05 (SLO)
  - Elfsborg (SWE) 8–0 Floriana (MLT)
  - Rudar Pljevlja (MNE) 0–1 Shirak (ARM)
  - Pyunik (ARM) 0–3 Zeta (MNE)
  - JJK (FIN) 2–0 Stabæk (NOR)
  - Differdange 03 (LUX) 3–0 NSÍ Runavík (FRO)
  - Dacia Chişinău (MDA) 1–0 Celje (SLO)
  - Sūduva Marijampolė (LTU) 0–1 Daugava (LAT)
  - Tirana (ALB) 2–0 Grevenmacher (LUX)
  - Torpedo Kutaisi (GEO) 1–1 Aktobe (KAZ)
  - Birkirkara (MLT) 2–2 Metalurg Skopje (MKD)
  - FC Santa Coloma (AND) 0–1 Osijek (CRO)
  - Sarajevo (BIH) 5–2 Hibernians (MLT)
  - Twente (NED) 6–0 UE Santa Coloma (AND)
  - Lech Poznań (POL) 2–0 Zhetysu (KAZ)
  - Olimpija Ljubljana (SLO) 3–0 Jeunesse Esch (LUX)
  - EB/Streymur (FRO) 3–1 Gandzasar (ARM)
  - MTK Budapest (HUN) 1–1 Senica (SVK)
  - Cefn Druids (WAL) 0–0 MYPA (FIN)
  - Flamurtari Vlorë (ALB) 0–1 Honvéd (HUN)
  - Teuta Durrës (ALB) 0–3 Metalurgi Rustavi (GEO)
  - La Fiorita (SMR) 0–2 Liepājas Metalurgs (LAT)
  - Bohemians (IRL) 0–0 Þór Akureyri (ISL)
  - Cliftonville (NIR) 1–0 Kalmar FF (SWE)
  - St. Patrick's Athletic (IRL) 1–0 ÍBV (ISL)
  - Bangor City (WAL) 0–0 Zimbru Chişinău (MDA)
  - Crusaders (NIR) 0–3 Rosenborg (NOR)
  - Borac Banja Luka (BIH) 2–2 Čelik Nikšić (MNE)
  - FH (ISL) 2–1 Eschen/Mauren (LIE)
- UEFA Women's U-19 Championship in Turkey:
  - Group A:
    - Turkey 0–1 Denmark
    - Portugal 1–0 Romania
  - Group B:
    - Spain 4–0 England
    - Serbia 1–5 Sweden
- Arab Nations Cup in Saudi Arabia:
  - Third place play-off:
    - Saudi Arabia 0–1 (bronze) **Iraq**
- Arab U-20 Championship in Amman, Jordan:
  - Group B:
    - Qatar 1–4 Mauritania
    - Algeria 0–0 Libya
- Arab U-17 Championship in Tunisia:
  - Group A:
    - Libya 0–2 Mauritania
    - Oman 4–0 Tunisia

==== Tennis ====
- Wimbledon Championships in London, Great Britain, day 10:
  - Women's singles semifinals:
    - **Agnieszka Radwańska (POL)** [3] def. Angelique Kerber (GER) [8] 6–3, 6–4
    - **Serena Williams (USA)** [6] def. Victoria Azarenka (BLR) [2] 6–3, 7–6^{(8–6)}

==== Volleyball ====
- FIVB World League Final round in Sofia, Bulgaria:
  - Pool E: Germany 3–2 United States
  - Pool F: Brazil 2–3 Poland

=== 4 July 2012 (Wednesday) ===
==== Basketball ====
- FIBA World Olympic Qualifying Tournament for Men in Caracas, Venezuela:
  - Group A: Greece 98–84 Puerto Rico
  - Group B: Nigeria 86–80 Lithuania
  - Group C: Russia 84–69 Dominican Republic
  - Group D: Angola 64–68 New Zealand

==== Cricket ====
- Australia in England:
  - 3rd ODI in Birmingham: Match abandoned without a ball bowled, England lead the 5-match series 2–0.
- Pakistan in Sri Lanka:
  - 2nd Test in Colombo, day 5: Pakistan 551/6d (147 overs) & 100/2d (18 overs); Sri Lanka 391 (124.4 overs) & 86/2 (22 overs). Match drawn, Sri Lanka lead the 3-match series 1–0.
- ICC World Cricket League Championship:
  - 1st ODI in Dublin: Ireland v Afghanistan, Match abandoned without a ball bowled.

==== Cycling ====
- Tour de France:
  - Stage 4: (gold) André Greipel (GER) (silver) Alessandro Petacchi (ITA) (bronze) Tom Veelers (NED)
  - General classification: Fabian Cancellara (SUI) (silver) Bradley Wiggins (GBR) (bronze) Sylvain Chavanel (FRA)
  - Points: Peter Sagan (SVK), Mountains: Michael Mørkøv (DEN), Young: Tejay van Garderen (USA), Team: Team Sky (GBR), Combat: Yukiya Arashiro (JPN)
- Tour of Qinghai Lake:
  - Stage 6: (gold) Luka Mezgec (SLO) (silver) Kiel Reijnen (USA) (bronze) Maksym Averin (UKR)
  - General classification: Hossein Alizadeh (IRI)
- Tour of Austria:
  - Stage 4: (gold) Jakob Fuglsang (DEN) (silver) Leopold König (CZE) (bronze) Robert Vrečer (SLO)
  - General classification: Jakob Fuglsang (DEN)
- Course de Solidarność et des Champions Olympiques:
  - Stage 1: (gold) Jeff Vermeulen (NED) (silver) Ralf Matzka (GER) (bronze) André Schulze (GER)
  - General classification: Jeff Vermeulen (NED)
  - Stage 2: (gold) André Schulze (GER) (silver) Marko Kump (SLO) (bronze) Michael Schweizer (GER)
  - General classification: André Schulze (GER)
- Sibiu Cycling Tour:
  - Prologue: (gold) Jon Einar Bergsland (NOR) (silver) Ioannis Tamouridis (GRE) (bronze) Joeri Adams (BEL)
  - General classification: Jon Einar Bergsland (NOR)
- Giro d'Italia Femminile:
  - Stage 6: (gold) Shelley Olds (USA) (silver) Marianne Vos (NED) (bronze) Giorgia Bronzini (ITA)
  - General classification: Marianne Vos (NED)

==== Football (soccer) ====
- Copa Libertadores Finals second leg (first leg score in parentheses): **Corinthians** (Brazil) 2–0 (1–1) (Argentina) Boca Juniors. Corinthians win 3–1 on aggregate.
- Arab U–17 Cup in Tunisia:
  - Group C: Algeria 0–3 Yemen
- Arab U-20 Championship in Amman, Jordan
  - Group A:
    - Kuwait 2–3 Sudan
    - Jordan 1–1 Saudi Arabia

==== Inline hockey ====
- Men's Junior World Inline Hockey Championship in Bucaramanga, Colombia:
  - Group stage:
    - Ecuador 2–10 Brazil
    - Mexico 5–3 Australia
    - Switzerland 0–4 Czech Republic
    - Colombia – Ecuador
    - United States – France
- Women's World Inline Hockey Championship in Bucaramanga, Colombia:
  - Group stage:
    - Argentina 9–0 Brazil
    - Mexico 0–1 Australia
    - Canada – France
    - Colombia – Australia
    - United States – (Spain)

==== Poker ====
- World Series of Poker in Las Vegas, United States:
  - Event #54: $1,000 No Limit Hold'em
    - (gold) Will Jaffe (USA) (silver) Luis Campelo (BRA) (bronze) Joseph Kuether (USA)
  - Event #56: $1,500 No Limit Hold'em
    - (gold) Tomas Junek (CZE) (silver) David Borg (AUS) (bronze) Donald Vogel (USA)

==== Tennis ====
- Wimbledon Championships in London, Great Britain, day 9:
  - Men's Singles Quarterfinals:
    - **Novak Djokovic (SRB)** [1] def. Florian Mayer (GER) [31] 6–4, 6–1, 6–4
    - **Roger Federer (SUI)** [3] def. Mikhail Youzhny (RUS) [26] 6–1, 6–2, 6–2
    - **Andy Murray (GBR)** [4] def. David Ferrer (ESP) [7] 6–7^{(7–5)}, 7–6^{(8–6)}, 6–4, 7–6^{(7–4)}
    - **Jo-Wilfried Tsonga (FRA)** [5] def. Philipp Kohlschreiber (GER) [27] 7–6^{(7–5)}, 4–6, 7–6^{(7–3)}, 6–2

==== Volleyball ====
- FIVB World League Final round in Sofia, Bulgaria:
  - Pool E: Bulgaria 3–1 Germany
  - Pool F: Cuba 3–0 Brazil

=== 3 July 2012 (Tuesday) ===
==== Basketball ====
- FIBA World Olympic Qualifying Tournament for Men in Caracas, Venezuela:
  - Group A: Jordan 52–93 Puerto Rico
  - Group B: Venezuela 82–100 Lithuania
  - Group C: South Korea 85–95 Dominican Republic
  - Group D: North Macedonia 84–62 New Zealand
- FIBA Under-17 World Championship in Kaunas, Lithuania:
  - Group A:
    - China 71–68 Czech Republic
    - Australia 88–73 Egypt
    - United States 86–50 France
  - Group B:
    - Spain 83–62 Canada
    - Argentina 106–59 South Korea
    - Croatia 82–78 Lithuania

==== Bridge ====
- European Youth Pairs Championships in Vejle, Denmark:
  - Mixed pairs: (gold) Justyna Zmuda / Bartlomiej Igla (POL) (silver) Joanna Taczewska / Piotr Zatorski (POL) (bronze) Signe Buus Thomsen / Dennis Bilde (DEN)

==== Bowling ====
- World Youth Bowling Championships in Bangkok, Thailand:
  - Boys masters: (gold) Daniel Fransson (SWE) (silver) Chris Via (USA) (bronze) Sam Cooley (AUS) and Marshall Kent (USA)
  - Girls masters: (gold) Hwang Yeon-ju (KOR) (silver) Jacqueline J Sijore (MAS) (bronze) Bernice Lim (SIN) and Dayang Khairuniza (MAS)

==== Cycling ====
- Tour de France:
  - Stage 3: (gold) Peter Sagan (SVK) (silver) Edvald Boasson Hagen (NOR) (bronze) Peter Velits (SVK)
  - General classification: Fabian Cancellara (SUI) (silver) Bradley Wiggins (GBR) (bronze) Sylvain Chavanel (FRA)
  - Points: Peter Sagan (SVK), Mountains: Michael Mørkøv (DEN), Young: Tejay van Garderen (USA), Team: Team Sky (GBR), Combat: Michael Mørkøv (DEN)
- Tour of Austria:
  - Stage 3: (gold) Sacha Modolo (ITA) (silver) Daniel Schorn (AUT) (bronze) Francesco Gavazzi (ITA)
  - General classification: Danilo Di Luca (ITA)
- Tour of Qinghai Lake:
  - Stage 5: (gold) Juan José Lobato (ESP) (silver) Kiel Reijnen (USA) (bronze) Artur Ershov (RUS)
  - General classification: Hossein Alizadeh (IRI)
- Giro d'Italia Femminile:
  - Stage 5: (gold) Tiffany Cromwell (AUS) (silver) Giorgia Bronzini (ITA) (bronze) Valentina Scandolara (ITA)
  - General classification: Marianne Vos (NED)

==== Football (soccer) ====
- UEFA Champions League First qualifying round, first leg:
  - F91 Dudelange (LUX) 7–0 Tre Penne (SMR)
  - Valletta (MLT) 8–0 Lusitanos (AND)
  - Linfield (NIR) 0–0 B36 Tórshavn (FRO)
- UEFA Europa League First qualifying round, first leg:
  - Víkingur (FRO) 0–6 Gomel (BLR)
  - Shkëndija (MKD) 0–0 Portadown (NIR)
- Arab Nations Cup in Saudi Arabia:
  - Semi finals:
    - Saudi Arabia 0–2 **Libya**
    - **Morocco** 2–1 Iraq
- Arab U–17 Cup in Tunisia:
  - Group B: Sudan 1–7 Iraq
- UEFA European Under-19 Championship in Estonia:
  - Group A:
    - Greece 1–2 Spain
    - Estonia 0–3 Portugal
  - Group B:
    - England 1–1 Croatia
    - Serbia 0–3 France

==== Inline hockey ====
- Men's Junior World Inline Hockey Championship in Bucaramanga, Colombia:
  - Group stage:
    - Mexico 2–5 France
    - Ecuador 0–16 Switzerland
    - Brazil 0–16 Czech Republic
    - Australia 2–11 United States
    - Czech Republic 5–2 Colombia
- Women's World Inline Hockey Championship in Bucaramanga, Colombia:
  - Group stage:
    - Argentina 1–12 Canada
    - Australia 0–3 United States
    - Brazil 0–9 France
    - Spain 8–0 Colombia
    - Mexico 0–7 (Spain)

==== Poker ====
- World Series of Poker in Las Vegas, United States:
  - Event #53: $1,500 No Limit Hold'em
    - (gold) Jim Willerson (USA) (silver) Vladimir Mefodichev (RUS) (bronze) Hugh Henderson (USA)
  - Event #55: $1,000,000 The Big One for One Drop
    - (gold) Antonio Esfandiari (USA) (silver) Sam Trickett (GBR) (bronze) David Einhorn (USA)

==== Pool billiards ====
- World Pool Team Championship in Beijing, China
  - Group A:
    - Indonesia 5–1 Estonia
    - Philippines 6–0 Croatia
  - Group B:
    - Canada 5–1 Malaysia
    - China 1 6–0 Finland
  - Group C:
    - Australia 3–3 Singapore
    - China 2 5–1 Hong Kong
  - Group D:
    - Poland 5–1 Vietnam
    - Japan 2–4 Sweden
  - Group E:
    - India 5–1 South Africa
    - Great Britain (United Kingdom) 3–3 South Korea
  - Group F:
    - Norway 4–2 Mongolia
    - Chinese Taipei 4–2 (Germany)

==== Tennis ====
- Wimbledon Championships in London, Great Britain, day 8:
  - Men's singles fourth round:
    - **Florian Mayer (GER)** [31] def. Richard Gasquet (FRA) [18] 6–3 6–1 3–6 6–2
    - **David Ferrer (ESP)** [7] def. Juan Martín del Potro (ARG) [9] 6–3 6–2 6–3
    - **Andy Murray (GBR)** [4] def. Marin Čilić (CRO) [16] 7–5 6–2 6–3
    - **Jo-Wilfried Tsonga (FRA)** [5] def. Mardy Fish (USA) [10] 4–6 7–6 6–4 6–4
    - **Philipp Kohlschreiber (GER)** [27] def. Brian Baker (USA) [Q] 6–1 7–6 6–3
  - Women's singles quarter finals:
    - **Angelique Kerber (GER)** [8] def. Sabine Lisicki (GER) [15] 6–3 6–7 7–5
    - **Serena Williams (USA)** [6] def. Petra Kvitová (CZE) [4] 6–3 7–5
    - **Victoria Azarenka (BLR)** [2] def. Tamira Paszek (AUT) [Q] 6–3 7–6
    - **Agnieszka Radwańska (POL)** [3] def. Maria Kirilenko (RUS) [17] 7–5, 4–6, 7–5

=== 2 July 2012 (Monday) ===
==== Basketball ====
- FIBA World Olympic Qualifying Tournament for Men in Caracas, Venezuela:
  - Group A: Greece 107–63 Jordan
  - Group B: Nigeria 69–71 Venezuela
  - Group C: Russia 91–56 South Korea
  - Group D: Angola 88–84 North Macedonia

==== Bowling ====
- World Youth Bowling Championships in Bangkok, Thailand:
  - Boys all events: (gold) Sam Cooley (AUS) (silver) Marshall Kent (USA) (bronze) Daniel Fransson (SWE)
  - Girls all events: (gold) Hwang Yeon-ju (KOR) (silver) New Hui Fen (SIN) (bronze) Kim Seon-jeong (KOR)

==== Cycling ====
- Tour de France:
  - Stage 2: (gold) Mark Cavendish (GBR) (silver) André Greipel (GER) (bronze) Matthew Goss (AUS)
  - General classification: Fabian Cancellara (SUI) (silver) Bradley Wiggins (GBR) (bronze) Sylvain Chavanel (FRA)
  - Points: Peter Sagan (SVK), Mountains: Michael Mørkøv (DEN), Young: Tejay van Garderen (USA), Team: Team Sky (GBR), Combat: Anthony Roux (FRA)
- Tour of Qinghai Lake:
  - Stage 4: (gold) Luka Mezgec (SLO) (silver) Kiel Reijnen (USA) (bronze) Kevin Claeys (BEL)
  - General classification: Hossein Alizadeh (IRI)
- Tour of Austria:
  - Stage 2: (gold) Danilo Di Luca (ITA) (silver) Steve Morabito (SUI) (bronze) Thomas Rohregger (AUT)
  - General classification: Danilo Di Luca (ITA)
- Giro d'Italia Femminile:
  - Stage 4: (gold) Marianne Vos (NED) (silver) Emma Johansson (SWE) (bronze) Tatiana Guderzo (ITA)
  - General classification: Marianne Vos (NED)

==== Football (soccer) ====
- UEFA Women's U-19 Championship in Turkey:
  - Group A:
    - Denmark 1–0 Romania
    - Turkey 0–0 Portugal
  - Group B:
    - England 0–1 Sweden
    - Spain 3–0 Serbia
- Arab U–17 Cup in Tunisia:
  - Group A:
    - Oman 2–1 Libya
    - Tunisia 4–2 Mauritania

==== Handball ====
- Women's Junior World Handball Championship in Czech Republic:
  - Group A:
    - China 22–37 Serbia
    - Uruguay 12–24 Denmark
    - Spain 25–26 Hungary
  - Group B:
    - Congo 20–29 Sweden
    - Kazakhstan 25–48 South Korea
    - Argentina 15–22 Czech Republic
  - Group C:
    - Poland 27–34 Russia
    - Angola 20–30 Austria
    - Japan 25–38 France
  - Group D:
    - Brazil 24–22 Romania
    - Norway 22–22 Netherlands
    - Tunisia 20–33 Croatia

==== Inline hockey ====
- Men's Junior World Inline Hockey Championship in Bucaramanga, Colombia:
  - Group stage:
    - France 11–2 Australia
    - Czech Republic 20–0 Ecuador
    - Brazil 1–8 Switzerland
    - United States 9–1 Mexico
    - Colombia 4–0 Brazil
- Women's World Inline Hockey Championship in Bucaramanga, Colombia:
  - Group stage:
    - France 6–3 Argentina
    - United States 3–1 Mexico
    - Canada 12–0 Brazil
    - Colombia 0–6 United States
    - Spain 7–1 Australia

==== Pool billiards ====
- World Pool Team Championship in Beijing, China
  - Group A:
    - Indonesia 6–0 Croatia
    - Philippines 5–1 Estonia
  - Group B:
    - Canada 4–2 Finland
    - China 1 4–2 Malaysia
  - Group C:
    - Australia 3–3 Hong Kong
    - China 2 6–0 Singapore
  - Group D:
    - Poland 3–3 Sweden
    - Japan 4–2 Vietnam
  - Group E:
    - South Korea 5–1 South Africa
    - Great Britain (United Kingdom) 6–0 India
  - Group F:
    - Germany 6–0 Mongolia
    - Chinese Taipei 6–0 Norway

==== Softball ====
- Women's World Cup of Softball in Oklahoma City, United States
  - Gold medal match: (gold) **United States** 3–0 (silver) Australia
  - Bronze medal match: (bronze) **Canada** 11–8 Netherlands
  - 5th place play-off: **Puerto Rico** 4–1 Brazil

==== Tennis ====
- Wimbledon Championships in London, Great Britain, day 7:
  - Men's singles fourth round:
    - **Novak Djokovic (SRB)** [1] def. Viktor Troicki (SRB) 6–3 6–1 6–3
    - **Roger Federer (SUI)** [3] def. Xavier Malisse (BEL) 7–6 6–1 4–6 6–3
    - **Mikhail Youzhny (RUS)** def. Denis Istomin (UZB) 6–3 5–7 6–4 6–7 7–5
  - Women's singles fourth round:
    - **Sabine Lisicki (GER)** [15] def. Maria Sharapova [1] (RUS) 6–4 6–3
    - **Angelique Kerber (GER)** [8] def. Kim Clijsters (BEL) 6–1 6–1
    - **Agnieszka Radwańska** (POL) [3] def. Camila Giorgi (ITA) [Q] 6–2 6–3
    - **Maria Kirilenko** (RUS) [17] def. Peng Shuai (CHN) [30] 6–1 6–7 6–3
    - **Serena Williams** (USA) [6] def. Yaroslava Shvedova (KAZ) [WC] 6–1 2–6 7–5
    - **Petra Kvitová** (CZE) [4] def. Francesca Schiavone (ITA) [24] 4–6 7–5 6–1
    - **Tamira Paszek** (AUT) def. Roberta Vinci (ITA) [21] 6–2 6–2
    - **Victoria Azarenka** (BLR) [2] def. Ana Ivanovic (SRB) [14] 6–1 6–0

=== 1 July 2012 (Sunday) ===
==== Athletics ====
- European Athletics Championships in Helsinki, Finland:
  - Men:
    - 1500m: (gold) Henrik Ingebrigtsen (NOR) (silver) Florian Carvalho (FRA) (bronze) David Bustos (ESP)
    - 110m hurdles: (gold) Sergey Shubenkov (RUS) (silver) Garfield Darien (FRA) (bronze) Artur Noga (POL)
    - Long jump: (gold) Sebastian Bayer (GER) (silver) Luis Méliz (ESP) (bronze) Michel Tornéus (SWE)
    - Pole vault: (gold) Renaud Lavillenie (FRA) (silver) Björn Otto (GER) (bronze) Raphael Holzdeppe (GER)
    - 4 × 100 m relay: (gold) Brian Mariano / Churandy Martina / Giovanni Codrington / Patrick van Luijk (NED) (silver) Julian Reus / Tobias Unger / Alexander Kosenkow / Lucas Jakubczyk (GER) (bronze) Ronald Pognon / Christophe Lemaitre / Pierre-Alexis Pessonneaux / Emmanuel Biron (FRA)
    - 4 × 400 m relay: (gold) Antoine Gillet / Jonathan Borlée / Jente Bouckaert / Kevin Borlée (BEL) (silver) Nigel Levine / Conrad Williams / Robert Tobin / Richard Buck (GBR) (bronze) Jonas Plass / Kamghe Gaba / Eric Krüger / Thomas Schneider (GER)
  - Women:
    - 1500m: (gold) Aslı Çakır Alptekin (TUR) (silver) Gamze Bulut (TUR) (bronze) Anna Mishchenko (UKR)
    - 10,000m: (gold) Ana Dulce Félix (POR) (silver) Joanne Pavey (GBR) (bronze) Olha Skrypak (UKR)
    - Discus throw: (gold) Sandra Perković (CRO) (silver) Nadine Müller (GER) (bronze) Natalya Semenova (UKR)
    - Hammer throw: (gold) Anita Włodarczyk (POL) (silver) Martina Hrašnová (SVK) (bronze) Anna Bulgakova (RUS)
    - 4 × 100 m relay: (gold) Leena Günther / Anne Cibis / Tatjana Lofamakanda Pinto / Verena Sailer (GER) (silver) Kadene Vassell / Dafne Schippers / Eva Lubbers / Jamile Samuel (NED) (bronze) Marika Popowicz / Daria Korczyńska / Marta Jeschke / Ewelina Ptak (POL)
    - 4 × 400 m relay: (gold) Yuilya Olishevska / Olha Zemlyak / Nataliya Pyhyda / Alina Lohvynenko (UKR) (silver) Phara Anacharsis / Lenora Guion Firmin / Marie Gayot / Floria Gueï (FRA) (bronze) Zuzana Hejnová / Zuzana Bergrová / Jitka Bartoničková / Denisa Rosolová (CZE)
- Gold Coast Marathon in Gold Coast, Queensland, Australia:
  - Men:
    - Marathon: (gold) Alemayehu Shumye (ETH) (silver) Robert Mwangi (KEN) (bronze) Ernest Kebenei (KEN)
    - Half marathon: (gold) Liam Adams (AUS) (silver) Harry Summers (AUS) (bronze) Shinichi Yamashita (JPN)
    - 10 km run: (gold) Patrick Tiernan (AUS) (silver) Hugh Williams (AUS) (bronze) Daryl Crook (AUS)
  - Women:
    - Marathon: (gold) Kaori Yoshida (JPN) (silver) Madoka Ogi (JPN) (bronze) Hellen Jemaiyo Kimutai (KEN)
    - Half marathon: (gold) Alex Watson (AUS) (silver) Narumi Shirataki (ETH) (bronze) Lisa Robertson (AUS)
    - 10 km run: (gold) Lisa Jane Weightman (AUS) (silver) Emma Moffatt (AUS) (bronze) Melanie Daniels (AUS)
- White Nights International Marathon in Saint Petersburg, Russia:
  - Men:
    - Marathon: (gold) Hassane Ahouchar (MAR) (silver) Geoffren Kiplagat Toroitich (KEN) (bronze) Andrey Minakov (RUS)
    - 10 km run: (gold) Dmitry Lukin (AUS) (silver) Artem Agapov (RUS) (bronze) Mikhail Kulkov (RUS)
  - Women:
    - Marathon: (gold) Vera Trubnikova (RUS) (silver) Tatiana Vilisova (RUS) (bronze) Alevtina Ivanova (RUS)
    - 10 km run: (gold) Maria Babich (RUS) (silver) Nyuganya Burtseva (RUS) (bronze) Veronika Mihaylova (RUS)

==== Basketball ====
- FIBA World Olympic Qualifying Tournament for Women in Ankara, Turkey:
  - Final: **Canada** 71–63 Japan
  - Qualified teams: Turkey, Croatia, Czech Republic, France, Canada
- FIBA Under-17 World Championship in Kaunas, Lithuania:
  - Group A:
    - France 53–59 China
    - Czech Republic 58–63 Australia
    - Egypt 73–111 United States
  - Group B:
    - South Korea 68–124 Croatia
    - Lithuania 83–91 Spain
    - Canada 80–76 Argentina

==== Beach volleyball ====
- FIVB World Cup Tournament in Moscow, Russia:
  - Men's semi final:
    - Austria 2–0 Mexico
      - Alexander Huber / Robin Seidl 2–1 Lombardo Ontiveros / Ulises Ontiveros
      - Clemens Doppler / Alexander Horst 2–0 Juan Virgen / Aldo Miramontes
    - Russia 2–0 Poland
      - Yury Bogatov / Dmitri Barsouk 2–0 Bartosz Losiak / Piotr Kantor
      - Konstantin Semenov / Serguei Prokopiev 2–0 Michal Kadziola / Jakub Szalankiewicz
  - Women's semi final:
    - Italy 0–2 Netherlands
      - Daniela Gioria / Giulia Momoli 1–2 Madelein Meppelink / Sophie van Gestel
      - Laura Giombini / Viktoria Orsi Toth 0–2 Michelle Stiekema / Rimke Braakman
    - Russia 2–0 (China)
      - Anastasia Vasina / Anna Vozakova 2–1 Changning Zhang / Yuanyuan Ma
      - Maria Bratkova / Svetlana Popova 2–1 Fan Wang / Yuan Yue
  - All nations winning in the semi-final qualify one team to the 2012 Olympics.
- CEV Men's Satellite Tournament in Lausanne, Switzerland:
  - (gold) Jefferson Bellaguarda / Patrick Heuscher(SUI) (silver) Finn Dittelbach / Steffen Drossler (GER) (bronze) Phil Gabathuler / Mirco Gerson (SUI)

==== BMX ====
- UCI Tour – Great Salt Lake Nationals in South Jordan, Utah, United States
  - Men: (gold) Sam Willoughby (AUS) (silver) Mike Day (USA) (bronze) Barry Nobles (USA)
  - Women: (gold) Caroline Buchanan (AUS) (silver) Dominique Daniels (PUR) (bronze) Dani George (USA)

==== Bowling ====
- World Youth Bowling Championships in Bangkok, Thailand:
  - Boys teams: (gold) Andrew Koff / Zack Hattori / Chris Via / Marshall Kent (USA) (silver) Basil Low / Keith Saw / Ng Chiew Pang / Mark Wong (SIN) (bronze) Kim Bolleby / Magnus Johnson / Daniel Fransson / Johan Hellden (SWE)
  - Girls teams: (gold) Jessica Earnest / Kelsey Muther / Amanda Greene / Danielle McEwan (USA) (silver) New Hui Fen / Ilma Nur Jannah / Krishna Darshini / Bernice Lim (SIN) (bronze) Kim Seon-jeong / Oh Nuri / Kim Ga-ram / Hwang Yeon-ju (KOR)

==== Canoeing ====
- ICF Wildwater Canoeing World Championships in La Plagne, France
  - Men:
    - C1 Sprint: (gold) Guillaume Alzingre (FRA) (silver) Igor Gojic (CRO) (bronze) Emil Milihram (CRO)
    - C2 Sprint: (gold) Guillaume Alzingre / Yann Claudepierre (FRA) (silver) Damien Guyonnet / Gaetan Guyonnet (FRA) (bronze) Michal Sramek / Lukas Tomek (CZE)
    - K1 Sprint: (gold) Nejc Znidarcic (SLO) (silver) Tobias Bong (GER) (bronze) Ben Oakley (GBR)
    - C1 Sprint team: (gold) Yann Claudepierre / Guillaume Alzingre / Louison Tanet (FRA) (silver) Igor Gojic / Tomislav Lepan / Emil Milihram (CRO) (bronze) Ondrej Rolenc / Lukas Novosad / Tomas Kejklicek (CZE)
    - C2 Sprint team: (gold) Yann Claudepierre / Guillaume Alzingre / Tom Bar / Mickaël Cordier / Damien Guyonnet / Gaetan Guyonnet (FRA) (silver) Michal Cuc / Jan Zdrahal / Michal Sramek / Lukas Tomek / Jan Šťastný / Ondrej Rolenc (CZE) (bronze) Johannes Baumann / Lars Walter / Stephan Stiefenhoffer / Guido Wahl / Maik Schmitz / Matthias Nies (GER)
    - K1 Sprint team: (gold) Nejc Znidarcic / Tim Kolar / Maks Franceskin (SLO) (silver) Tomas Slovak / Karel Slepica / Richard Hala (CZE) (bronze) Paolo Bifano / Mariano Bifano / Jaka Jazbec (ITA)
  - Women:
    - C1 Sprint: (gold) Marjolaine Hecquet (FRA) (silver) Julie Paoletti (FRA) (bronze) Hana Peterkova (CZE)
    - K1 Sprint: (gold) Claire Bren (FRA) (silver) Laetitia Parage (FRA) (FRA) Sixtine Malaterre (bronze)
    - K1 Sprint team: (gold) Alke Overbeck / Manuela Stoberl / Sabine Füsser (GER) (silver) Sixtine Malaterre / Laetitia Parage / Claire Bren (FRA) (bronze) Sabine Eichenberger / Chantal Abgottspon / Melanie Mathys (SUI)

==== Cricket ====
- Australia in England:
  - 2nd ODI at The Oval, London: Australia 251/7 (50 overs); England 252/4 (45.4 overs). England win by 6 wickets and lead 5-match series 2–0.
- New Zealand in West Indies:
  - 2nd T20I in Lauderhill, Florida: West Indies 177/5 (20 overs); New Zealand 116 (18.4 overs). West Indies win by 61 runs and win the 2-match series 2–0.
- India women in England:
  - 1st ODI at Lord's, London: England 229 (49.1 overs); India 230/5 (49.3 overs). India win by 5 wickets and lead the 5-match series 1–0.
- U-19 Asian Cup in Kuala Lumpur, Malaysia:
  - Final: Pakistan 282/9 (50 overs); India 282/8 (50 overs). Match tied.

==== Cycling ====
- Tour de France:
  - Stage 1: (gold) Peter Sagan (SVK) (silver) Fabian Cancellara (SUI) (bronze) Edvald Boasson Hagen (NOR)
  - General classification: Fabian Cancellara (SUI) (silver) Bradley Wiggins (GBR) (bronze) Sylvain Chavanel (FRA)
  - Points: Fabian Cancellara (SUI), Mountains: Michael Mørkøv (DEN), Young: Tejay van Garderen (USA), Team: Team Sky (GBR), Combat: Nicolas Edet (FRA)
- Czech Cycling Tour:
  - Stage 4: (gold) Matej Jurčo (SVK) (silver) Jaka Bostner (SLO) (bronze) Josef Černý (CZE)
  - General classification: Frantisek Padour (CZE) (silver) Pavel Kochetkov (RUS) (bronze) Sven van Luijk (NED)
- Tour of Qinghai Lake in China:
  - Stage 3: (gold) Hossein Alizadeh (IRI) (silver) Walter Pedraza (COL) (bronze) Sergey Firsanov (RUS)
  - General classification: Hossein Alizadeh (IRI)
- Tour of Austria:
  - Stage 1: (gold) Alessandro Bazzana (ITA) (silver) Francesco Gavazzi (ITA) (bronze) Marco Canola (ITA)
  - General classification: Alessandro Bazzana (ITA)
- Giro d'Italia Femminile:
  - Stage 3: (gold) Evelyn Stevens (USA) (silver) Fabiana Luperini (ITA) (bronze) Emma Pooley (GBR)
  - General classification: Evelyn Stevens (USA)
- Elorrio Classic in Elorrio, Spain:
  - (gold) Inmaculada Pereiro (ESP) (silver) Ana Santesteban (ESP) (bronze) Irene San Sebastian (ESP)
- Classic Féminine Vienna Poitou-Charentes in France:
  - (gold) Audrey Cordon (FRA) (silver) Aude Biannic (FRA) (bronze) Fiona Dutriaux (FRA)

==== Darts ====
- PDC Players Championship #10 in Crawley, Great Britain:
  - Final: **Colin Lloyd (ENG)** 6–5 (ENG) Andy Hamilton

==== Fencing ====
- FIE Fencing World Cup in Leipzig, Germany:

Women's epée team: (gold) Poland (POL) (silver) Estonia (EST) (bronze) Italy (ITA)

- FIE Fencing World Cup in Buenos Aires, Argentina:

Men's epée team: (gold) Hungary (HUN) (silver) Canada (CAN) (bronze) Switzerland (SUI)

- FIE Fencing World Cup in Havana, Cuba:

Men's foil team: (gold) Italy (ITA) (silver) China (CHN) (bronze) Egypt (EGY)

==== Football (soccer) ====
- UEFA Euro 2012 Final in Kyiv, Ukraine: **Spain** 4–0 Italy
  - Spain wins the title for the second successive time and becomes the first team to do so.
- Malaysia FAM League ends
  - (gold) Kuala Lumpur SPA [38p] (silver) Shahzan Muda [34p] (bronze) UiTM FC [34p]
    - Kuala Lumpur SPA wins promotion to the Malaysian Premier League

==== Golf ====
- PGA Tour:
  - AT&T National in Bethesda, Maryland:
    - (gold) Tiger Woods (USA) (silver) Bo Van Pelt (USA) (bronze) Adam Scott (AUS)
- Senior majors:
  - Senior Players Championship in Pittsburgh, Pennsylvania:
    - (gold) Joe Daley (USA) (silver) Tom Lehman (USA) (bronze) Olin Browne (USA)
- European Tour:
  - Irish Open in Portrush, Northern Ireland:
    - (gold) Jamie Donaldson (WAL) (silver) Rafael Cabrera-Bello (ESP) (bronze) Anthony Wall (ENG)
- LPGA Tour:
  - Walmart NW Arkansas Championship in Rogers, Arkansas:
    - (gold) Ai Miyazato (JPN) (silver) Mika Miyazato (JPN) / Azahara Muñoz (ESP) (tied)

==== Handball ====
- Women's Junior World Handball Championship in Czech Republic
  - Group A:
    - **Denmark** 29–19 China
    - **Serbia** 25–22 Spain
    - **Hungary** 37–22 Uruguay
  - Group B:
    - **South Korea** 42–13 Congo
    - **Czech Republic** 32–22 Kazakhstan
    - **Sweden** 19–18 Argentina
  - Group C:
    - **Austria** 37–29 Poland
    - **Russia** 28–16 Japan
    - **France** 33–15 Angola
  - Group D:
    - Netherlands 29–32 **Brazil**
    - **Romania** 37–28 Tunisia
    - Croatia 21–22 **Norway**

==== Inline hockey ====
- Women's World Inline Hockey Championship in Bucaramanga, Colombia:
  - Group stage:
    - Mexico 3–0 Colombia

==== Kiteboarding ====
- Slalom World Championships in Westerland, Germany:
  - Men: (gold) Julien Kerneur (FRA) (silver) Maxime Nocher (FRA) (bronze) Rolf van der Vlugt (NED)
  - Women: (gold) Katja Roose (NED) (silver) Caroline Adrien (FRA) (bronze) Kristin Boese (GER)

==== Motorsports ====
- 2012 British Formula Three season at the Norisring, Germany:
  - (gold) Felix Serralles (CUB) (silver) Hannes van Asseldonk (NED) (bronze) Pietro Fantin (BRA)
- 2012 Eurocup Formula Renault 2.0 season at the Nürburgring, Germany:
  - (gold) Stoffel Vandoorne (BEL) (silver) Melville McKee (GBR) (bronze) Pierre Gasly (FRA)
- 2012 FIA European Formula 3 Championship season at the Norisring in Germany:
  - (gold) Raffaele Marciello (ITA) (silver) Daniel Juncadella (ESP) (bronze) Emil Bernstorff (GBR)
- 2012 Formula Renault 3.5 Series season at the Nürburgring, Germany:
  - (gold) Nick Yelloly (GBR) (silver) Marco Sørensen (DEN) (bronze) André Negrão (BRA)
- 2012 Deutsche Tourenwagen Masters season at the Norisring, Germany:
  - (gold) Jamie Green (GBR) (silver) Martin Tomczyk (GER) (bronze) Bruno Spengler (CAN)
- 2012 FIM Motocross World Championship season in Uddevalla, Sweden:
  - MX1:
    - Race 1: (gold) Clement Desalle (BEL) (silver) Christophe Pourcel (FRA) (bronze) Sébastien Pource (FRA)
    - Race 2: (gold) Clement Desalle (BEL) (silver) Christophe Pourcel (FRA) (bronze) Kevin Strijbos (BEL)
  - MX2:
    - Race 1: (gold) Jeffrey Herlings (NED) (silver) Tommy Searle (GBR) (bronze) Joël Roelants (BEL)
    - Race 2: (gold) Tommy Searle (GBR) (silver) Jeremy Van Horebeek (BEL) (bronze) Dylan Ferrandis (FRA)
  - MX3:
    - Race 1: (gold) Martin Michek (CZE) (silver) Klemen Gercar (SLO) (bronze) Michael Staufer (AUT)
    - Race 2: (gold) Martin Michek (CZE) (silver) Matthias Walkner (AUT) (bronze) Klemen Gercar (SLO)
- 2012 Superbike World Championship season at Motorland Aragón, Spain
  - Race 1: (gold) Max Biaggi (ITA) (silver) Marco Melandri (ITA) (bronze) Carlos Checa (ESP)
  - Race 2: (gold) Marco Melandri (ITA) (silver) Eugene Laverty (IRL) (bronze) Chaz Davies (GBR)
- 2012 Supersport World Championship season at Motorland Aragón, Spain
  - (gold) Sam Lowes (GBR) (silver) Fabien Foret (FRA) (bronze) Sheridan Morais (RSA)

==== Mountain biking ====
- UCI World Cup in Windham, New York, United States:
  - Men downhill: (gold) Aaron Gwin (USA) (silver) Steve Smith (CAN) (bronze) Gee Atherton (GBR)
  - Women downhill: (gold) Rachel Atherton (GBR) (silver) Tracey Hannah (AUS) (bronze) Emmeline Ragot (FRA)

==== Poker ====
- World Series of Poker in Las Vegas, United States:
  - Event #50: $5,000 No Limit Hold'em
    - (gold) Pete Vilandros (USA) (silver) Kyle Julius (USA) (bronze) Dan Smith (USA)
  - Event #51: $1,000 Ladies No Limit Hold'em Championship
    - (gold) Yen Dang (USA) (silver) Debbie Pechac (USA) (bronze) Janet Howard (USA)
  - Event #52: $2,500 10-Game Mix Six Handed
    - (gold) Vanessa Selbst (USA) (silver) Michael Saltzburg (USA) (bronze) Tam Hang (USA)

==== Pool billiards ====
- World Pool Team Championship in Beijing, China
  - Group A:
    - Philippines 4–2 Indonesia
    - Croatia 5–1 Estonia
  - Group B:
    - China 1 5–1 Canada
    - Finland 4–2 Malaysia
  - Group C:
    - China 2 4–2 Australia
    - Hong Kong 3–3 Singapore
  - Group D:
    - Japan 4–2 Poland
    - Sweden 3–3 Vietnam
  - Group E:
    - Great Britain (United Kingdom) 6–0 South Africa
    - South Korea 6–0 India
  - Group F:
    - Chinese Taipei 6–0 Mongolia
    - Germany 3–3 Norway

==== Sepaktakraw ====
- ISTAF Super Series in Bangkok, Thailand
  - Men:
    - Gold medal match: (gold) **Thailand** def. Malaysia (silver) 15–8 15–11 15–10
    - Bronze medal match: (bronze) **South Korea** def. Singapore 15–10 15–8 9–15 15–11
  - Women:
    - Gold medal match: (gold) **Thailand** def. Vietnam (silver) 15–11 15–5 15–9
    - Bronze medal match: (bronze) **South Korea** def. Malaysia 14–16 15–9 15–13 15–13

==== Ski jumping ====
- Continental Cup in Stams, Austria:
  - Men's HS115: (gold) Lukas Müller (AUT) (silver) Anders Jacobsen (NOR) (bronze) Dawid Kubacki (POL)

==== Snooker ====
- Wuxi Classic in Wuxi, China
  - Final: (England) Stuart Bingham 4–10 **Ricky Walden** (England)

==== Softball ====
- Women's World Cup of Softball in Oklahoma City, United States
  - Group stage:
    - United States 9–0 Brazil
    - Australia 4–0 Netherlands
    - Canada 7–0 Puerto Rico
    - Canada 13–0 Brazil

==== X Games ====
- X Games XVIII in Los Angeles, United States:
  - Open:
    - BMX Freestyle Big Air: (gold) Steve McCann (AUS) (silver) Zack Warden (USA) (bronze) Kevin Robinson (USA)
  - Men:
    - Skateboard: (gold) Paul Rodriguez (USA) (silver) Ryan Sheckler (USA) (bronze) Nyjah Huston (USA)
    - RallyCross: (gold) Sébastien Loeb (FRA) (silver) Ken Block (USA) (bronze) Brian Deegan (USA)
    - Moto X Eduro X: (gold) Mike Brown (USA) (silver) Cody Webb (USA) (bronze) Cory Graffunder (CAN)
  - Women:
    - Moto X Eduro X: (gold) Maria Forsberg (USA) (silver) Louise Forsley (USA) (bronze) Chantelle Bykerk (CAN)

==== Volleyball ====
- FIVB World Grand Prix:
  - Final Round in Ningbo, China:
    - (bronze) Turkey 1–3 (silver) Brazil
    - Thailand 3–0 Cuba
    - China 0–3 (gold) United States
      - Final standings: United States 14 points, Brazil 13, Turkey 9, Thailand 5, China 4, Cuba 0.
      - The United States win the title for the fifth time.
- FIVB World League, Week 4: (teams in **bold** advance to final round)
  - Pool C:
    - France 3–0 South Korea
    - **United States** 3–2 Italy
  - Pool D:
    - Portugal 2–3 Argentina
    - **Germany** 3–2 **Bulgaria**
