= Zdráhal =

Zdráhal (Czech feminine: Zdráhalová) is a surname. Notable people with the surname include:

- Jan Zdráhal (born 1991), Czech ice hockey player
- Luděk Zdráhal (born 1969), Czech footballer
- Nikola Zdráhalová (born 1996), Czech speed skater
- Patrik Zdráhal (born 1995), Czech ice hockey player
- Pavel Zdráhal (born 1971), Czech ice hockey player
