= 2012 English cricket season =

County Championship
- Champions: Warwickshire
- Runners-up: Somerset
- Most runs: Nick Compton (1,191)
- Most wickets: Graham Onions (64)

Clydesdale Bank 40
- Champions: Hampshire Royals
- Runners-up: Warwickshire Bears
- Most runs: Michael Carberry (598)
- Most wickets: Ajmal Shahzad (21)

Friends Life t20
- Champions: Hampshire Royals
- Runners-up: Yorkshire Carnegie
- Most runs: Phillip Hughes (402)
- Most wickets: Mitchell Starc (21)

PCA Player of the Year
- Nick Compton

Wisden Cricketers of the Year
- Tim Bresnan; Alastair Cook; Glen Chapple; Alan Richardson; Kumar Sangakkara

The 2012 English cricket season was the 113th in which the County Championship had been an official competition. It began on 31 March with a round of university matches, and continued until the final of the Clydesdale Bank 40 on 15 September. Three major domestic competitions were contested: the 2012 County Championship won by Warwickshire, the 2012 Clydesdale Bank 40 and the 2012 Friends Life t20 both won by Hampshire Royals.

During this season, three Test teams toured England: West Indies lost both the Test series (2–0) and the One Day International (ODI) series (2–0), and the solitary Twenty20 International (T20I). Australia also toured, in a series of five match One Day International (ODI) series which they lost 4–0. South Africa also toured, beating England in a three Test series 2–0 and drew the five match ODI series and the three match Twenty20 International (T20I) series.

== Roll of honour ==
Test series

- England v West Indies: 3 Tests - England won 2–0.
- England v South Africa: 3 Tests - South Africa won 2–0.

ODI series

- England v West Indies: 3 ODIs - England won 2–0.
- England v Australia: 5 ODIs - England won 4–0.
- England v South Africa: 5 ODIs - Series drawn 2-2.

Twenty20 International series

- England v West Indies: Only T20I - England won by 7 wickets.
- England v South Africa: 3 T20Is - Series drawn 1-1.

County Championship

- Division One winners: Warwickshire
- Division One Runners-up: Somerset
- Division Two winners: Derbyshire (on most wins)
- Relegated from Division One: Lancashire and Worcestershire
- Promoted from Division Two: Derbyshire and Yorkshire

Clydesdale Bank 40 (CB40)

- Winners: Hampshire Royals - Runners-up: Warwickshire Bears

Friends Life t20

- Winners: Hampshire Royals - Runners-up: Yorkshire Carnegie

Minor Counties Championship

- Winners: Cornwall

MCCA Knockout Trophy

- Winners: Cumberland

Second XI Championship

- Winners: Kent II

Second XI Trophy

- Winners: Lancashire II - Runners-up: Durham II

Second XI Twenty20 - Winners
England Under-19s

Wisden Cricketers of the Year

- Tim Bresnan, Alastair Cook, Glen Chapple, Alan Richardson, Kumar Sangakkara

PCA Player of the Year

- Nick Compton

PCA Most Valuable Player of the Year

- Peter Trego

== County Championship ==
=== Divisions ===
Division One	Division Two
Durham	Derbyshire
Lancashire	Essex
Middlesex	Glamorgan
Nottinghamshire	Gloucestershire
Somerset	Hampshire
Surrey	Kent
Sussex	Leicestershire
Warwickshire	Northamptonshire
Worcestershire	Yorkshire

Icon
Team promoted from Division Two
Team relegated from Division One

=== Division One Standings ===
- Pld = Played, W = Wins, L = Losses, D = Draws, T = Ties, A = Abandonments, Bat = Batting points, Bowl = Bowling points, Ded = Deducted points, Pts = Points.

Team	Pld	W	L	T	D	A	Bat	Bowl	Ded	Pts
Warwickshire (C)	16	6	1	0	9	0	43	45	0.0	211
Somerset	16	5	1	0	10	0	32	45	0.0	187
Middlesex	16	5	4	0	7	0	33	38	0.0	172
Sussex	16	5	5	0	6	0	28	41	0.0	167
Nottinghamshire	16	4	2	0	10	0	26	43	0.0	163
Durham	16	5	5	0	6	0	18	45	4.0	157
Surrey	16	3	4	0	9	0	26	40	2.0	139
Lancashire (R)	16	1	5	0	10	0	25	35	0.0	106
Worcestershire (R)	16	1	8	0	7	0	17	42	0.0	96

=== Division Two Standings ===
- Pld = Played, W = Wins, L = Losses, D = Draws, T = Ties, A = Abandonments, Bat = Batting points, Bowl = Bowling points, Ded = Deducted points, Pts = Points.

Team	Pld	W	L	T	D	A	Bat	Bowl	Ded	Pts
Derbyshire (C)	16	6	2	0	8	0	31	43	0.0	194
Yorkshire (P)	16	5	0	0	11	0	41	40	0.0	194
Kent	16	4	3	0	9	0	39	40	0.0	170
Hampshire	16	4	5	0	7	0	28	40	0.0	153
Essex	16	3	3	0	10	0	27	40	0.0	145
Glamorgan	16	3	6	0	7	0	28	35	1.0	131
Leicestershire	16	3	3	0	10	0	24	33	5.0	130
Northamptonshire	16	2	5	0	9	0	37	34	0.0	130
Gloucestershire	16	3	6	0	7	0	22	35	0.0	126

== Clydesdale Bank 40 ==
=== Group stage ===
Group A
Pos	Team	Pld	W	L	T	NR	Pts	NRR
1	Lancashire Lightning	12	9	2	0	1	19	0.050
2	Middlesex Panthers	12	6	3	1	2	15	0.778
3	Gloucestershire Gladiators	12	5	5	0	2	12	0.995
4	Netherlands	12	5	6	0	1	11	−0.910
5	Essex Eagles	12	4	6	0	2	10	−0.185
6	Leicestershire Foxes	12	3	6	0	3	9	−0.732
7	Worcestershire Royals	12	3	7	1	1	8	−0.011

Group B
Pos	Team	Pld	W	L	T	NR	Pts	NRR
1	Hampshire Royals	12	7	3	0	2	16	0.754
2	Surrey Lions	12	6	3	0	3	15	0.466
3	Somerset	12	6	4	0	2	14	0.385
4	Nottinghamshire Outlaws	12	6	5	0	1	13	0.101
5	Durham Dynamos	12	5	5	0	2	12	0.262
6	Welsh Dragons	12	3	6	0	3	9	−0.971
7	Scottish Saltires	12	1	8	0	3	5	−1.359

Group C
Pos	Team	Pld	W	L	T	NR	Pts	NRR
1	Sussex Sharks	12	7	1	0	4	18	1.012
2	Warwickshire Bears	12	8	3	0	1	17	0.660
3	Kent Spitfires	12	7	2	0	3	17	0.870
4	Derbyshire Falcons	12	4	5	0	3	11	−0.438
5	Yorkshire Carnegie	12	4	7	0	1	9	0.006
6	Northamptonshire Steelbacks	12	1	6	0	5	7	−0.568
7	Unicorns	12	1	8	0	3	5	−1.545

=== Knockout stage ===
Semi-finals
1	Sussex Sharks	219/8
4	Hampshire Royals	222/2
3	Warwickshire Bears	250/6
2	Lancashire Lightning	227

Final
Hampshire Royals	244/5
Warwickshire Bears	244/7

== Friends Life t20 ==
=== Group stage ===
Midlands/Wales/West Division
Pos	Team	Pld	W	L	T	NR	Pts	NRR
1	Somerset	10	5	2	0	3	13	0.275
2	Gloucestershire Gladiators	10	4	2	0	4	12	0.248
3	Worcestershire Royals	10	4	3	0	3	11	0.578
4	Warwickshire Bears	10	4	3	0	3	11	−0.033
5	Welsh Dragons	10	2	3	0	5	9	−0.708
6	Northamptonshire Steelbacks	10	1	7	0	2	4	−0.611

North Group
Pos	Team	Pld	W	L	T	NR	Pts	NRR
1	Yorkshire Carnegie	10	7	1	0	2	16	0.863
2	Nottinghamshire Outlaws	10	5	1	0	4	14	1.877
3	Durham Dynamos	10	4	4	1	1	10	−0.251
4	Lancashire Lightning	10	3	4	1	2	9	0.106
5	Derbyshire Falcons	10	2	6	0	2	6	−0.561
6	Leicestershire Foxes	10	2	7	0	1	5	−1.352

South Group
Pos	Team	Pld	W	L	T	NR	Pts	NRR
1	Sussex Sharks	10	6	1	0	3	15	1.389
2	Hampshire Royals	10	5	2	0	3	13	0.693
3	Essex Eagles	10	5	4	0	1	11	−0.032
4	Kent Spitfires	10	4	5	0	1	9	−0.465
5	Middlesex Panthers	10	3	7	0	0	6	−0.210
6	Surrey Lions	10	3	7	0	0	6	−0.700

=== Knockout stage ===
Quarter-finals
N2	Nottinghamshire Outlaws	178/7
S2	Hampshire Royals	182/6
M1	Somerset	175/6
S3	Essex Eagles	148
S1	Sussex Sharks	230/4
M2	Gloucestershire Gladiators	191/8
N1	Yorkshire Carnegie	212/5
M3	Worcestershire Royals	183/6

Semi-finals
S2	Hampshire Royals	126/4
M1	Somerset	125/6
S1	Sussex Sharks	136/8
N1	Yorkshire Carnegie	172/6

Final
S2	Hampshire Royals	150/6
N1	Yorkshire Carnegie	140/8

== See also ==
- Australian cricket team in England and Ireland in 2012
