= Tanet =

- Pronunciation: pronounced [ˈtãːnet] or pronounced [ˈtane(t)]

Origin
- Origin: Breton
- Meaning: alight, afire, lit, on, on fire, heated
- Region of origin: Brittany

Other names
- Variant form: Tannet

Tanet or Tannet is a surname. The French surname Tanet could be toponymic or a sobriquet in origin. Spelling variations of this family name include: Tanat, Tannat, Tanet, Tanett, Tanatt, Tannatt, or even Danet due to apophony, and many more. In the case of 'Tanet' several interpretations are possible. The surname can be traced back to the Old Breton "tanet" meaning "aflame", that could be a nickname for a nervous or irritated trait or as a corruption of the Common Celtic 'tan-arth' "high fire", derived from the place where the original bearer once resided, suggesting in this case "one who dwelt on the beacon or lighthouse".

Tanet could also be a corruption of the toponymic tanouët meaning oak grove (tannoed, which underwent a consonant mutation to tann-eto in Common Brittonic), and has the same root as Gaulish tanno- (oak tree), Latin tannum (oak bark) used in the tanning of leather, Old High German tanna (oak, fir, akin) from proto-Germanic tan, (needle, what sticks out) and Breton tann (oak tree). In Old French speaking regions it also meant brown cloth or the color of the tan and designated the manufacturer.

This surname is now spread all over France with concentrations in Brittany and Aquitaine, though the Aquitanian origin may differ. A toponymic term tannet is also found in Savoie, Switzerland, Alpes-Maritimes: tanne, tune, tannaz, taverno or tuna (cave, hole, den or vault). Tanné is also commonly found in Finistère.

A similar surname is also found in Irish sept of Ó Tanaidhe (Tanny, Tannay, Tanney, Tanie, Taney), part of the Clan Drugain (Tanaide, Tanaidhe, Tanaí (TAWN-ee/TAHN ee) meaning slender, subtle.

People with the name include:

- Chantal Tanet, French writer and translator from Périgord
- Claire Tannett, ice dancer - see 2009 Canadian Figure Skating Championships
- Louison Tanet, French wildwater canoeist - see July 2012 in sports
- Steve Tannet, English musician and producer

== See also ==
- Tannet of Pagan, a king of the Pagan dynasty of Burma (Myanmar) from c. 876 to c. 904
- Abbé Taneth of Locminé, Breton monk who was forced to flee after the Saint-Sauveur abbay in Moréac was destroyed by Normans around 919, in 927 he settled in Berry.
- Thanet District: the Historia Brittonum, written in Wales in the 9th century, states that "Tanet" was the name used for the island by the legendary Anglo-Saxons Hengist and Horsa
- River Tanat, Wales
- Tanette, a precolonial Indonesian state abolished in 1960
- 772 Tanete, an asteroid
- "Tanet", a Yemeni Arabic name for Halothamnus bottae.
- Tannat, a red wine grape
