= June 2012 in sports =

<<	June 2012					>>
Su	Mo	Tu	We	Th	Fr	Sa
					1	2
3	4	5	6	7	8	9
10	11	12	13	14	15	16
17	18	19	20	21	22	23
24	25	26	27	28	29	30
Sports

This list shows notable sports-related deaths, events, and notable outcomes that occurred in June of 2012.

== Days of the month ==
=== June 11, 2012 (Monday) ===
Ice hockey

- The Los Angeles Kings defeat the New Jersey Devils in the 2012 Stanley Cup Final of the National Hockey League in six games, winning their first championship title.

=== June 8, 2012 (Friday) ===
Football (soccer)

- The UEFA Euro 2012 starts.

Triple Crown of Thoroughbred Racing

- I'll Have Another is pronounced scratched form the 2012 Belmont Stakes due to a leg injury, thus extending the already record setting Triple Crown drought to 34 years since Affirmed last won sports' most elusive championship.

Football (soccer)

- West Bromwich Albion manager Roy Hodgson is named as the new manager of the England national football team, replacing Fabio Capello, who resigned in February. He will take charge of the team, upon the conclusion of the 2011–12 Premier League season. (BBC Sport)
- Matchday 5 of the AFC Champions League group stage takes place in Asia. In Group C, Sepahan and Al-Ahli defeated their respective opponents Al-Nasr and Lekhwiya 3–0. Group D saw Al-Hilal defeat Persepolis 1–0 and Al-Gharafa beat Al-Shabab 2–1. Central Coast Mariners defeated Tianjin Teda 5–1 in Group G, while Seongnam Ilhwa Chunma and Nagoya Grampus played out a 1–1 draw in the other group game. Kashiwa Reysol won 1–0 against Buriram United and Jeonbuk Hyundai Motors defeated Guangzhou Evergrande 3–1 in Group H.
- The Copa Libertadores Round of 16 continued in South America; Cruz Azul and Libertad played out a 1–1 draw, and a goal from Iván Bella gave Vélez Sársfield a 1–0 victory at Atlético Nacional.

Snooker

- Following a 13–2 World Championship quarter-final defeat to fellow Scottish player Stephen Maguire, seven-time world champion Stephen Hendry announces his immediate retirement from the sport, aged 43. (The Daily Telegraph)

Swimming

- Men's 100m breaststroke world champion Alexander Dale Oen dies aged 26, after suffering a cardiac arrest at a training camp in Flagstaff, Arizona. (Associated Press via The Guardian)
