= Cristian Benenati =

Italian cyclist

Personal information
- Born: 15 July 1982 (age 44) Vittoria, Sicily, Italy

Cycling career
- Sport: Cycling
- Discipline: Road
- Role: Rider

Professional teams
- 2009: ISD
- 2010–2011: De Rosa–Stac Plastic
- 2012: Farnese Vini–Selle Italia

Cristian Benenati (born 15 July 1982 in Vittoria, Sicily) is an Italian former professional road cyclist.
