= Rolf van der Vlugt =

Dutch kitesurfer

- Born: 27 October 1981 (age 44)
- Occupation: Professional kite surfer

Rolf van der Vlugt (born 27 October 1981) is a Dutch professional kite surfer.

In July 2012 he won the bronze medal in the Slalom World Championships, finishing behind Julien Kerneur and Maxime Nocher.

== Achievements ==
2008
(silver) PKRA World Tour Port Saint Louis (kite cross)
Outright Netherlands speed sailing record (47.36 knots)

2010
(bronze) PKRA World Tour Sankt Peter-Ording (kite cross)
(gold) PKRA World Tour Fuerteventura (kite cross)
2011
4th PKRA World Tour Thailand (kite cross)
6th PKRA World Tour Sankt Peter-Ording (kite cross)
2012
(bronze) World Championships (slalom)
