= 2012 Global Champions Tour =

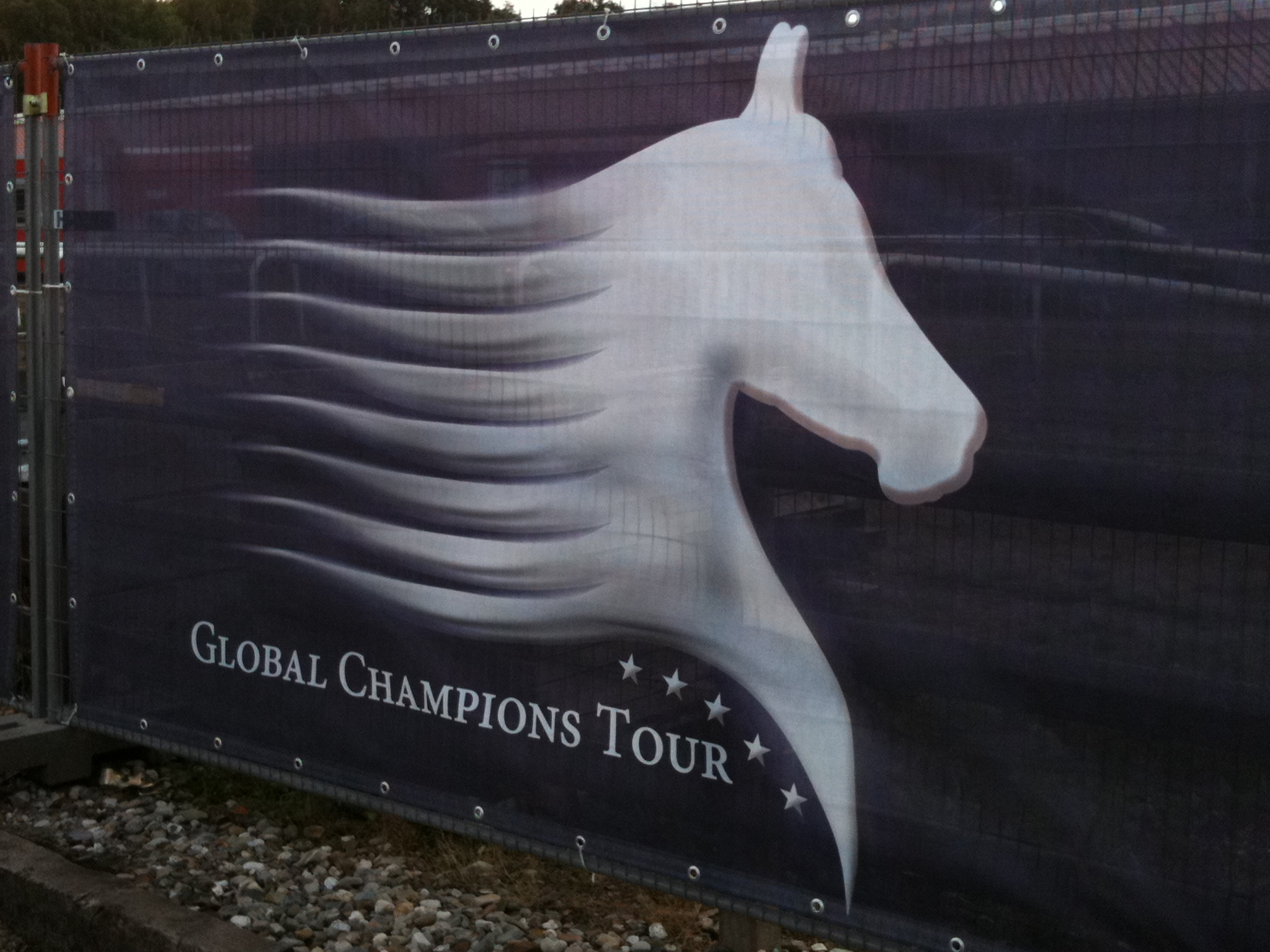
Logo of the Global Champions Tour

The 2012 Global Champions Tour was the seventh edition of the Global Champions Tour (GCT), an important international show jumping competition series.

== The series ==
The series is held mainly in Europe. The first and the last station is held in Arabia. In France and Germany two competitions of the GCT will be held.

All competitions will be endowed at least €285,000. All GCT events will be held as CSI 5*.

The competitions were held between April 5, 2012 and November 24, 2012. There was no final. At the end of the season the best 18 riders in the final overall standings had got a bonus prize money.

=== Rule change ===
With 13 stations, the 2012 Global Champions Tour is the season with the highest number of competitions in the GCT history. Because of this high number of competitions and the early date of the 2012 Olympic Games, the Equestrian Federations from Europe see a threat to the FEI Nations Cup competitions. The Nations Cup are crucial to remain show jumping at the future Olympic Games.

Because of this, the European Equestrian Federation called for an FEI rule change: important Nations Cups should not be held in future at the same weekend as GCT events or other CSI 5* horse shows. The International Jumping Rider Clubs decided at a poll that only the ranking point of six or seven GCT events will into account for the final ranking of GCT. The FEI took on this decision, so only the ranking point of seven per rider GCT events count for the final ranking.

== Competitions ==
All competitions were held as competition over two rounds against the clock with one jump-off against the clock.

=== First competition: Doha ===
April 5, 2012 to April 7, 2012 – Qatar Racing & Equestrian Club, Doha, Qatar
Competition: Saturday, April 7, 2012 – Start: 6:30 pm, prize money: €450,000

The jumping course in the round arena in Doha was built by Uliano Vezzani from Italy. In the first round of the competition, 15 riders had no faults, one rider had one time fault and two riders had four faults with the fastest time qualified for the second round. In the second round, most of the riders had fewer problems with the obstacles, but the allowed time was difficult: three riders had one time fault with their horses, three more riders had also time faults. Seven riders had no faults with their horses in both rounds.

In the jump-off, last year's GCT ranking winner, Edwina Tops-Alexander, rode a fast faultless round with her 16-year-old gelding, Itot du Château. Next Christian Ahlmann started in the jump-off: with a high speed he missed the right distance to the second obstacle. At the end he had a result of eight points with Codex One. Also, all other riders who started in this jump-off could not reach the result of Tops-Alexander, so she won the GCT Grand Prix of Qatar.

	Rider	Horse	Round 1		Round 2		Jump-off		Scoring points
	Rider	Horse	Penalties	Time (s)	Penalties	Time (s)	Penalties	Time (s)	Scoring points
1	(Australia) Edwina Tops-Alexander	Itot du Château	0	-	0	-	0	40.99	40
2	(Germany) Marco Kutscher	Cornet Obolensky	0	-	0	-	0	41.24	37
3	(Switzerland) Pius Schwizer	Verdi III	0	-	0	-	0	41.32	35

(Top 3 of 42 competitors)

=== Second competition: Oliva ===
May 4, 2012 to May 6, 2012 – Oliva Nova Beach and Golf Resort, Oliva near Valencia, Spain

The Spanish Global Champions Tour event was held first time not in Valencia. The new location is a newly built equestrian facility at the Oliva Nova Beach and Golf Resort in Oliva, 80 miles from Valencia on the Mediterranean coast. The facility was opened in February and March of this year, with several CSI 2* tournaments called Mediterranean Equestrian Tour.

The CGI 5* GCT Grand Prix was held on May 5, 2012 at 4:45 pm local time. The course was created by Frank Rothenberger from Germany. In the first round the allowed time was the major problem for many riders. Only five of 40 riders had more the eight fault points in round one, three riders did not finish the round.

Qualified for round two were all riders without faults, riders with less than four fault points and Marcus Ehning as riders with the fastest four fault round. In the second round riders had again time faults beside obstacle faults. French rider, Kevin Staut could almost prevent his fall after a refusal, but his stirrup broke, so he retired.

Five riders were qualified for the jump-off. Here, first Michael Whitaker, then Ben Maher got in the lead. After Maher, no other rider had a faultless round in the jump-off.

	Rider	Horse	Round 1		Round 2		Jump-off		Scoring points
	Rider	Horse	Penalties	Time (s)	Penalties	Time (s)	Penalties	Time (s)	Scoring points
1	(United Kingdom) Ben Maher	Tripple X III	0	-	0	-	0	41.35	40
2	(United Kingdom) Michael Whitaker	Viking	0	-	0	-	0	42.17	37
3	(Republic of Ireland) Denis Lynch	Abbervail van het Dingeshof	0	-	0	-	4	40.91	35

(Top 3 of 40 competitors)

=== Third competition: Hamburg ===
May 16, 2012 to May 20, 2012 – Hamburg (German show jumping and dressage derby), Germany
Competition: Saturday, May 19, 2012 – Start: 1:20 pm

The first GCT event in Germany in 2012 was held in Hamburg at the tradition-rich German show-jumping and dressage derby. The show jumping course was built by Frank Rothenberger, who built the courses also at this event in the last years.

Round one of the competition was equitable challenging, all faultless riders and the three fastest four-fault riders were qualified for the second round. Also in the second round the allowed time was not the problem for the riders, but the course was more challenging in round two. Five of 18 riders qualified for the jump-off.

The jump-off had, besides long ways to gallop, also some shortcuts. All riders had ridden these short cuts, so it was a fast jump-off. In this jump-off, only two riders had no faults: last year's winner Rolf-Göran Bengtsson and Nick Skelton, Skelton was with Big Star more than one second faster, so he won the Grand Prix of Hamburg.

	Rider	Horse	Round 1		Round 2		Jump-off		Scoring points
	Rider	Horse	Penalties	Time (s)	Penalties	Time (s)	Penalties	Time (s)	Scoring points
1	(United Kingdom) Nick Skelton	Big Star	0	-	0	-	0	47.97	40
2	(Sweden) Rolf-Göran Bengtsson	Casall	0	-	0	-	0	49.32	37
3	(Germany) Katrin Eckermann	Carlson	0	-	0	-	4	48.87	35

(Top 3 of 49 competitors)

=== 4th Competition: Wiesbaden ===
May 25, 2012 to May 28, 2012 – Wiesbaden (Pfingstturnier), Germany
Competition: Saturday, May 26, 2012 – Start: 4:30 pm

First time ever a GCT competition was held in 2012 at the "Pfingstturnier Wiesbaden" (Wiesbaden Pentecost horse show). The GCT competition at the 76th Pfingstturnier was held at Saturday, May 26, 2012. As at the last two GCT competitions, two courses were designed by Frank Rothenberger.

Besides all faultless competitors from the first round, one rider with two time faults and four riders with four faults from the first round were qualified for the second round. In the second round, many of the remaining 18 starters had four faults and only two riders had no faults with their horses in the second round. As the first one of these two-time faultless riders, Meredith Michaels-Beerbaum started in the jump-off, where it was the first time her horse Bella Donna was competing at this high of a competition level. The French rider Olivier Guillon, with his much more experienced horse Lord de Theize, was the second rider in the jump-off. With a fast faultless round, Guillon won the competition.

	Rider	Horse	Round 1		Round 2		Jump-off		Scoring points
	Rider	Horse	Penalties	Time (s)	Penalties	Time (s)	Penalties	Time (s)	Scoring points
1	(France) Olivier Guillon	Lord de Theize	0	-	0	-	0	55.59	40
2	(Germany) Meredith Michaels-Beerbaum	Bella Donna	0	-	0	-	0	57.72	37
3	(Spain) Manuel Añon	Baldo DS	0	-	4	72.82			35

(Top 3 of 42 competitors)

=== 5th Competition: Cannes ===
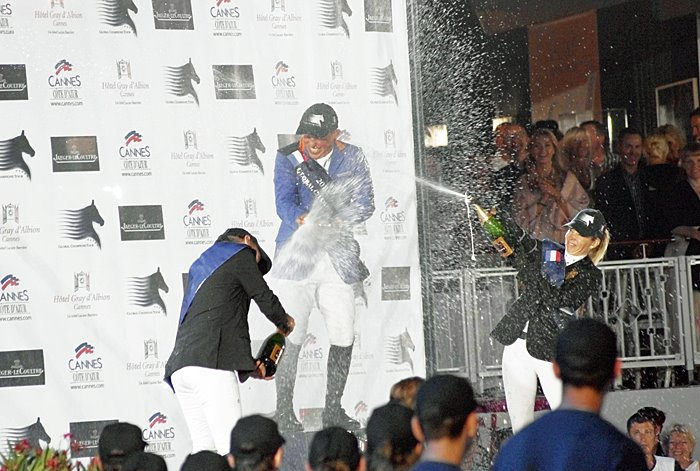
Podium of the GCT of Cannes.

June 14, 2012 to June 16, 2012 – Cannes, France

The first GCT event in France this season was held from June 14 to June 16, 2012 at the Jumping Cannes horse show. This event was held at the Stade des Hespérides in Cannes.

The Grand Prix de la Ville de Cannes, the Cannes GCT competition, was held at Saturday evening under floodlight. The show jumping course was designed by Uliano Vezzani. The first round was challenging, 13 of 46 riders had 12 or more penalty points.

In the second competition, which includes three double combinations, seven riders had no faults. In the addition of both rounds three riders with their horses had no penalty points, they were qualified for the jump-off. As first rider, Rolf-Göran Bengtsson got in the lead. Gerco Schröder was the next, he was 16 hundredths of a second faster than Bengtsson. As last competitor the winner of the last two years in this competition, Edwina Tops-Alexander, started in the jump-off. She also had a fast time with her horse Itot du Château, but Bengtsson and Schröder was faster than Tops-Alexander.

	Rider	Horse	Round 1		Round 2		Jump-off		Scoring points
	Rider	Horse	Penalties	Time (s)	Penalties	Time (s)	Penalties	Time (s)	Scoring points
1	(Netherlands) Gerco Schröder	London	0	-	0	-	0	34.22	40
2	(Sweden) Rolf-Göran Bengtsson	Casall	0	-	0	-	0	34.38	37
3	(Australia) Edwina Tops-Alexander	Itot du Château	0	-	0	-	0	34.89	35

(Top 3 of 46 competitors)

=== 6th Competition: Monaco ===
June 28, 2012 to June 30, 2012 – shore at the marina Port Hercule, Monte Carlo, Monaco

The GCT horse show of Monaco was held at the shore of the Boulevard Albert 1er at the Port Hercule. The events were held on a provisionally show jumping arena. As two weeks previously, also the GCT competition of Monaco was held under floodlight.

The course was built on a small showground (approximately 30 meters wide and 70 meters long) again by Uliano Vezzani from Italy. The competition (Grand Prix du Prince de Monaco) is named after Prince Albert II, which also undertook the award ceremony together with his niece Charlotte Casiraghi.

From the first round all (nine) riders with four penalty points, two riders with one time fault and seven faultless riders were qualified for the second round. In this second round, seven riders had no faults, four riders had no faults in both rounds.

As first rider Christina Liebherr from Switzerland start in the jump-off. She had one obstacle fault and was fourth in the final result. The surprise of the competition was Abdelkebir Ouaddar from Morocco, who started for the first time in a GCT competition. Ouaddar was with the nine-year-old gelding Porche du Fruitier (owned by Mohammed VI of Morocco) in the second competition in the jump-off. He was placed third in the final result. After him, Hans-Dieter Dreher and Kevin Staut started in the jump-off, both had no faults but not a better time than Ouaddar. Staut won the competition with Reveur de Hurtebise, a gelding from Belgium.

	Rider	Horse	Round 1		Round 2		Jump-off		Scoring points
	Rider	Horse	Penalties	Time (s)	Penalties	Time (s)	Penalties	Time (s)	Scoring points
1	(France) Kevin Staut	Reveur de Hurtebise	0	-	0	-	0	37.51	40
2	(Germany) Hans-Dieter Dreher	Embassy II	0	-	0	-	0	38.16	37
3	(Morocco) Abdelkebir Ouaddar	Porche du Fruitier	0	-	0	-	4	37.13	35

(Top 3 of 40 competitors)

=== 7th Competition: Estoril ===
July 13, 2012 to July 14, 2012 – Hipódromo Manuel Possolo, Cascais near Estoril, Portugal

The Grande Prémio Turismo de Portugal, GCT competition of Portugal, was held on July 14, 2012 at 7:00 pm. The show jumping course was built by Frank Rothenberger. Many riders, which are nominated for the 2012 Olympic Games, had started not with their best horse; other riders start with their number one horses in this competition.

The first round was no problem for many riders, 20 riders had no faults - they were qualified for the second round. The second round had a much higher level of difficulty. Six of 20 competitions had again a faultless round.

As one of the first of the six riders in the jump-off, Philipp Weishaupt ride with the stallion Leoville. Weishaupt and Leoville had a faultless and very fast round, they got in the lead. The following riders had all slower times than Weishaupt, so he won the competition.

	Rider	Horse	Round 1		Round 2		Jump-off		Scoring points
	Rider	Horse	Penalties	Time (s)	Penalties	Time (s)	Penalties	Time (s)	Scoring points
1	(Germany) Philipp Weishaupt	Leoville	0	-	0	-	0	44.96	40
2	(United Kingdom) Michael Whitaker	Viking	0	-	0	-	0	45.65	37
3	(Germany) Ludger Beerbaum	Chaman	0	-	0	-	0	47.46	35

(Top 3 of 36 competitors)

=== 8th Competition: Chantilly ===
July 20, 2012 to July 22, 2012 – Chantilly Racecourse, Chantilly, France

The GCT competition of Chantilly was held on July 21 at 3:30 pm. Course designer was Uliano Vezzani. Just one week ago, 20 riders were faultless in a GCT competition, in Chantilly the first round of the competition was much more difficult. Only five riders had no faults in round one, so all riders with four and five penalty points were qualified for the second round.

In the second round, much more riders had no faults, 13 of 18 riders had no faults with their horses in the second round. Three riders had no faults in both rounds. Beezie Madden was the first one to start in the jump off. She was fast with her horse Simon and had a time of 39.15 seconds. Karim El Zoghby, who was underdog in this jump-off, had a jumping fault early in the jump-off. As last rider Hans-Dieter Dreher with the stallion Magnus Romeo going into the jump-off. He was also very fast, so he won the competition with a lead of three tenths of a second.

	Rider	Horse	Round 1		Round 2		Jump-off		Scoring points
	Rider	Horse	Penalties	Time (s)	Penalties	Time (s)	Penalties	Time (s)	Scoring points
1	(Germany) Hans-Dieter Dreher	Magnus Romeo	0	-	0	-	0	38.82	40
2	(United States) Beezie Madden	Simon	0	-	0	-	0	39.15	37
3	(Egypt) Karim El Zoghby	Splendor	0	-	0	-	4	44.92	35

(Top 3 of 42 competitors)

=== 9th Competition: Valkenswaard ===
August 17, 2012 to August 19, 2012 – Valkenswaard, Netherlands

The first GCT competition after the Olympic Games was held in Valkenswaard, home of GCT founder Jan Tops. The competition was held on August 18,2012 at 2:30 pm. The jumping courses was created by Uliano Vezzani. Twelve of 48 riders had no faults in the first round of the competition. These riders, three riders with one faults and the fastest three riders with four faults were qualified for the second round. For a long time, no rider in the second competition had a faultless round. As first one German Philipp Weishaupt and Catoki had no faults at the fences, but they had (as in the first round) one time fault.

50 percent of the riders, which were faultless in the first round, were also faultless in round two. These six riders were qualified for the jump-off. The first three riders in the jump-off had no faults, Ludger Beerbaum was the fastest of the three riders. The next three riders in the jump-off had faults at the fences, so Beerbaum won the competition.

	Rider	Horse	Round 1		Round 2		Jump-off		Scoring points
	Rider	Horse	Penalties	Time (s)	Penalties	Time (s)	Penalties	Time (s)	Scoring points
1	(Germany) Ludger Beerbaum	Chaman	0	-	0	-	0	41.32	40
2	(United States) Richard Spooner	Cristallo	0	-	0	-	0	42.05	37
3	(Sweden) Rolf-Göran Bengtsson	Carusso	0	-	0	-	4	43.43	35

(Top 3 of 48 competitors)

=== 10th Competition: Lausanne ===
September 14, 2012 to September 16, 2012 – Place de Bellerive, Lausanne, Switzerland

For the first time, a GCT competition was held in 2012 in Switzerland, in Lausanne. The GCT competition was held at 6:00 pm on September 15. The course of the Grand Prix of Switzerland was designed by Swiss Rolf Lüdi. 18 competitions (the number of riders, who qualified for the second round) had no faults at the fences in the first round, one of them had one time fault. No competitor from Switzerland was qualified for the second round, the best rider from Switzerland was Janika Sprunger with Palloubet d'Halong on the 25th place.

In the second round, one third of the 18 competitions again had no faults. These six riders were qualified for the jump-off. In the jump-off, only two riders were faultless for a third time, the fastest one was Laura Kraut with her grey gelding Cedric.

	Rider	Horse	Round 1		Round 2		Jump-off		Scoring points
	Rider	Horse	Penalties	Time (s)	Penalties	Time (s)	Penalties	Time (s)	Scoring points
1	(United States) Laura Kraut	Cedric	0	-	0	-	0	42,53	40
2	(Sweden) Rolf-Göran Bengtsson	Casall	0	-	0	-	0	45,37	37
3	(Australia) Edwina Tops-Alexander	Itot du Château	0	-	0	-	4	44,21	35

(Top 3 of 47 competitors)

=== 11th Competition: Vienna ===
September 20, 2012 to September 23, 2012 – Rathausplatz, Vienna, Austria

=== 12th Competition: Abu Dhabi ===
November 22, 2012 to November 24, 2012 – Al-Forsan International Sports Resort, Abu Dhabi, United Arab Emirates

== Standings ==
	Rider	(Qatar) Doha	(Spain) Oliva	(Germany) Hamburg	(Germany) Wies- baden	(France) Cannes	Monaco	(Portugal) Estoril	(France) Chantilly	(Netherlands) Valkens- waard	(Switzerland) Lausanne	(Austria) Wien	(United Arab Emirates) Abu Dhabi	Total scoring points	Prize money (bonus)
1	(Australia) Edwina Tops-Alexander	40	(28)	28	—	35	30	28	(0)	(0)	35			196	
2	(Sweden) Rolf-Göran Bengtsson	(0)	—	37	21	37	—	—	24	35	37			191	
3	(Germany) Christian Ahlmann	30	(0)	(23)	—	29	(0)	31	31	25	28			174	
2	(Republic of Ireland) Denis Lynch	26	35	—	—	(0)	31	29	30	(0)	0			151	
3	(United Kingdom) Michael Whitaker	(0)	37	19	(0)	(0)	27	37	29	(0)	0			149	

Six results count for the final standing.
