= Igor Gojić =

Croatian canoeist

Personal information
- Nationality: Croatian
- Born: 30 July 1984 (age 41) Croatia

Sport
- Sport: Canoeing
- Event: Wildwater canoeing
Medal record
Event	1st	2nd	3rd
World Championships	0	0	2

Igor Gojić (born 30 July 1984) is a Croatian male canoeist who won two medals at senior level at the Wildwater Canoeing World Championships.

== Medals at the World Championships ==
Senior

Year	1st place, gold medalist(s)	2nd place, silver medalist(s)	3rd place, bronze medalist(s)
2016	0	0	1
2019	0	0	1
