= 2012 Royal International Horse Show =

The 2012 Longines Royal International Horse Show was the 2012 edition of the Royal International Horse Show, the British official show jumping horse show at the All England Jumping Course at Hickstead. It was held as CSIO 5*.

The 2012 edition of the Royal International Horse Show was held between 19 and 22 July 2012. Different from other years, this year Royal International Horse Show only consist of Show jumping competitions. Dressage competitions was not held because of the Equestrian competitions at the 2012 Summer Olympics just one week ahead.

== FEI Nations Cup of the United Kingdom ==
The 2012 FEI Nations Cup of the United Kingdom was part of the 2012 Royal International Horse Show. It was the seventh competition of the 2012 FEI Nations Cup.

The 2012 FEI Nations Cup of the United Kingdom was held on Friday 20 July 2012. The competing teams were: Great Britain, the Netherlands, Germany, Ireland, Sweden, France, Belgium and the Switzerland.

The competition was a show jumping competition with two rounds and optionally one jump-off. The height of the fences were up to 1.60 meters. The competition was endowed with 200,000 €.

	Team	Rider	Horse	Round A	Round B	Total penalties	Jump-off		Prize money	Scoring points
	Team	Rider	Horse	Penalties	Penalties	Total penalties	Penalties	Time (s)	Prize money	Scoring points
1	Ireland	Shane Breen	Cos I Can	0	8					
1	Ireland	Richie Moloney	Ahorn van de Zuuthoeve	0	0					
1	Ireland	Darragh Kerins	Lisona	0	4					
1	Ireland	Clement McMahon	Pacino	retired	0					
1	Ireland			0	4	4			64,000 €	10
2	France	Eugénie Angot	Old Chap Tame	0	0					
2	France	Kevin Staut	Reveur de Hurtebise	0	4					
2	France	Aymeric de Ponnat	Armitages Boy	0	4					
2	France	Pénélope Leprevost	Topinambour	did not start	retired					
2	France			0	8	8			40,000 €	7
3	Germany	Philipp Weishaupt	Catoki	0	4					
3	Germany	Holger Wulschner	Cefalo	4	12					
3	Germany	Ludger Beerbaum	Chiara	0	4					
3	Germany	Marco Kutscher	Cornet Obolensky	0	4					
3	Germany			0	12	12			32,000 €	6
4	Great Britain	William Funnell	Billy Angelo	4	4					
4	Great Britain	Peter Charles	Nevada	4	4					
4	Great Britain	Tina Fletcher	Hello Sailor	0	4					
4	Great Britain	John Whitaker	Argento	8	4					
4	Great Britain			8	12	20			24,000 €	5
5	Sweden	Douglas Lindelow	Udermus	4	0					
5	Sweden	Angelie von Essen	Carrento Ztar	4	8					
5	Sweden	Daniel Zetterman	Glory Days	8	0					
5	Sweden	Helena Persson	Chamonix H	8	8					
5	Sweden			16	8	24			13,500 €	3,5
5	Belgium	Niels Bruynseels	Conisha van de Helle	8	0					
5	Belgium	Maurice van Roosbroeck	Dylano	16	4					
5	Belgium	Rik Hemeryck	Quarco de Kerambars	0	8					
5	Belgium	Dominique Hendrickx	Cor van de Wateringhoeve	8	4					
5	Belgium			16	8	24			13,500 €	3,5
7	Netherlands	Leon Thijssen	Tyson	8	4					
7	Netherlands	Albert Zoer	Sam	12	4					
7	Netherlands	Hendrik-Jan Schuttert	Cerona	16	0					
7	Netherlands	Albert Voorn	Tobalio	0	8					
7	Netherlands			20	8	28			8,000 €	2
8	Switzerland	Claudia Gisler	Touchable	12	8					
8	Switzerland	Simone Wettstein	Cash and Go	0	13					
8	Switzerland	Marc Oertly	Tamira IV	4	4					
8	Switzerland	Andreas Ott	Loxy de la Reselle CH	24	12					
8	Switzerland			16	24	40			5,000 €	1

(grey penalties points do not count for the team result)

== The Longines King Georges V Gold Cup ==
The King Georges V Gold Cup, the Show jumping Grand Prix of the 2012 Royal International Horse Show, was the major show jumping competition at this event. The sponsor of this competition was Longines. It was held on Sunday 22 July 2012. The competition was a show jumping competition with one round and one jump-off, the height of the fences were up to 1.60 meters.

It was endowed with 200,000 €.

	Rider	Horse	Round 1	jump-off		prize money
	Rider	Horse	Penalties	Penalties	Time (s)	prize money
1	(Netherlands) Hendrik-Jan Schuttert	Cerona	0	0	54.91	66,000 €
2	(Germany) Ludger Beerbaum	Chiara	0	0	55.27	40,000 €
3	(France) Marie Hecart	Myself de Breve	0	0	55.49	30,000 €
4	(United Kingdom) Louise Pavitt	Don VHP Z	0	0	56.18	20,000 €
5	(Belgium) Pieter Devos	Candy	0	0	56.92	12,000 €

(Top 5 of 47 Competitors)
