= Julien Kerneur =

French kitesurfer

- Born: 1 November 1991 (age 34)
- Occupation: Professional kite surfer

Julien Kerneur (born 1 November 1991) is a French professional kite surfer. He is sponsored by Ozone Kiteboarding.

In July 2012 he won the gold medal in the Slalom World Championships, finishing in front of Maxime Nocher and Rolf van der Vlugt.

== Achievements ==
2008
4th PKRA World Tour France (kite cross)
2009
(bronze) PKRA World Tour Paros (kite cross)
2010
(bronze) PKRA World Tour Thailand (kite cross)
(silver) PKRA World Tour Sankt Peter-Ording (kite cross)
4th PKRA World Tour Fuerteventura (kite cross)
(bronze) PKRA World Tour Bariloche (kite cross)

2011
(gold) PKRA World Tour Thailand (kite cross)
(bronze) PKRA Word Tour (kite cross)
(bronze) PKRA World Tour Sankt Peter-Ording (kite cross)
2012
5th PKRA World Tour Mexico (kite cross)
4th PKRA World Tour The Hague, Scheveningen
6th PKRA World Tour Hyères (kite cross)
(gold) World Championships (slalom)
