= Barry Nobles =

American BMX and mountain bike racer

Personal information
- Full name: Barry Nobles
- Nickname: Alabama Slamma
- Born: December 2, 1986 (age 39) Wetumpka, Alabama, U.S.

Cycling career
- Sport: Cycling
- Disciplines: BMX Racing, Mountain bike
- Role: Professional Athlete

Barry Nobles (born December 2, 1986) is an American professional BMX and mountain bike racer, known by the nickname Alabama Slamma. He has achieved national and international recognition in BMX racing, including multiple USA BMX titles and a UCI Masters BMX World Championship. Nobles has also competed in mountain biking, freestyle BMX, and off-road motorcycle racing.

== Early life and background ==
Nobles was born in Wetumpka, Alabama. He began riding BMX at age three and entered his first competition at age eleven, around 1997. He developed his skills at a local BMX track in Oak Mountain State Park. Later, he moved to Menifee, California, to pursue his racing career more seriously.

== Career ==
=== 2000–2010 ===
Nobles turned professional in 2003 and became a consistent competitor on the national circuit. At age 16, he won the Junior Men's World Championship title at the 2003 UCI BMX World Championships in Perth, Australia.

=== 2010–2020 ===
In 2010, he placed third in the elite men's 4X at the USA Cycling Mountain Bike National Championships.

Nobles remained active in elite BMX racing while occasionally competing in other cycling disciplines. In 2016, he placed second in the U.S. Olympic Trials Time Trial event.

=== 2020–present ===
Nobles has competed in every USA BMX season since turning pro, winning the USA BMX National Vet Pro title in 2022, 2023, and 2024.

In 2023, he won the UCI Masters BMX World Championship in Glasgow, Scotland.

=== Freestyle and Dirt BMX ===
Nobles has also competed in freestyle and dirt jump BMX events. He notably attempted a double backflip in competition, which was covered by BMX media. He also participated in freestyle exhibitions and was known for his fearless approach to big jumps, often incorporating tricks typically reserved for freestyle specialists. In 2019, he participated in the BMX Dirt qualification at the X Games.

=== Off-road Racing ===
In addition to cycling, Nobles competed in and won the Mint 400 desert motorcycle race in Las Vegas in 2022, riding a Harley-Davidson Pan America.

=== Media and Sponsorships ===
Nobles was featured in the short documentary Alabama Slamma: The Barry Nobles Story, which covers his life and racing career.

He served as a brand ambassador for Mercedes-Benz Vans USA from 2020 to 2023 and was featured in national commercials, including the “Projections” TV spot.

Nobles was featured on the cover of Pull Magazine in both the May–June 2023 issue and October 2022, the latter titled "The Barry Effect."

=== Online Presence ===
Nobles maintains an active presence on social media, where he shares training footage, travel content, and BMX lifestyle updates with fans. His YouTube and Instagram accounts have contributed to building his personal brand within the BMX community.

== Personal life ==
Nobles married Kelsie Laframboise in 2020. She is also involved in the BMX community. They reside in Westover, Alabama with their daughter.

== Injuries and recovery ==
In late 2022, Nobles sustained a serious hand injury during training, which temporarily sidelined him during the 2022 racing season. He returned to racing soon after and later underwent surgery and rehabilitation in the off-season.

== Major results ==
2003: 1st – UCI BMX World Championships, Junior Men

2010: 3rd – USA Cycling MTB National Championships, Elite Men's 4X

2016: 2nd – USA Olympic Trials, BMX Time Trial

2022: 1st – USA BMX National Vet Pro Champion

2023: 1st – UCI BMX Masters World Champion

2023: 1st – USA BMX National Vet Pro Champion

2024: 1st – USA BMX National Vet Pro Champion
