= Jan Zdráhal =

Czech ice hockey player

- Born: May 26, 1991 (age 33); Czechoslovakia
- Height: 5 ft 11 in (180 cm)
- Weight: 209 lb (95 kg; 14 st 13 lb)
- Position: Defence
- Shoots: Right
- Czech Extraliga team: HC Pardubice
- NHL draft: Undrafted
- Playing career: 2010–present

Jan Zdráhal (born May 26, 1991) is a Czech professional ice hockey defenceman. He currently plays with HC Pardubice of the Czech Extraliga.

Zdráhal made his Czech Extraliga debut playing with HC Pardubice during the 2011–12 Czech Extraliga season.
