= Australian cricket team in England and Ireland in 2012 =

The Australian cricket team toured England and Ireland in June and July 2012. Australia played a One Day International (ODI) against Ireland on 23 June, and a five-match ODI series against England from 29 June to 10 July. They also played two List A tour matches against English county sides Leicestershire Foxes and Essex Eagles. The tour was put in jeopardy at the start of June 2012, when industrial action was threatened by the Australian Cricketers' Association because of a dispute over the inclusion of performance-related pay in the contract between the players and Cricket Australia.

== Squads ==
ODIs
England	Ireland	Australia
Alastair Cook (c); James Anderson; Jonny Bairstow; Ian Bell; Ravi Bopara; Tim Bresnan; Stuart Broad; Jade Dernbach; Steven Finn; Craig Kieswetter (wk); Eoin Morgan; Samit Patel; Graeme Swann; Jonathan Trott	William Porterfield (c); Alex Cusack; George Dockrell; Trent Johnston; Ed Joyce; John Mooney; Tim Murtagh; Kevin O'Brien; Niall O'Brien (wk); Max Sorensen; Paul Stirling; Andrew White; Gary Wilson (wk)	Michael Clarke (c); Shane Watson (vc); George Bailey; Pat Cummins; Xavier Doherty; Peter Forrest^{†}; Ben Hilfenhaus; David Hussey; Mitchell Johnson; Brett Lee; Clinton McKay; James Pattinson; Steve Smith; Matthew Wade (wk); David Warner

^{†} Peter Forrest replaced the withdrawn Michael Hussey.

== Ireland ==
Australian cricket team in Ireland in 2012
	Australia	Ireland
- Date: 23 June 2012
Captains	Michael Clarke	William Porterfield

One Day International series
- Results: 1-match series drawn 0–0
Most runs	–	Paul Stirling (24)
Most wickets	Brett Lee (2)	–

=== Only ODI ===
23 June
11:30
Scorecard

Ireland; 36/3 (10.4 overs)	v	Australia
Paul Stirling 24 (27); Brett Lee 2/10 (3 overs)

No result
Civil Service Cricket Club Ground, Stormont, Belfast
Umpires: Mark Hawthorne (Ire) and Richard Kettleborough (Eng)

- Australia won the toss and elected to field.
- Match abandoned after 10.4 overs due to heavy rain.
- Tim Murtagh (Ire) made his ODI debut.

== England ==
Australian cricket team in England in 2012
	Australia	England
- Dates: 21 June – 10 July 2012
Captains	Michael Clarke	Alastair Cook

One Day International series
- Results: England won the 5-match series 4–0
Most runs	George Bailey (149)	Ian Bell (189)
Most wickets	Clint McKay (5)	Steven Finn (8)
- Player of the series: Ian Bell (Eng)

=== Tour matches ===
==== 50-over: Leicestershire Foxes v Australians ====
21 June 2012
10:45
Scorecard

Australians; 241/8 (41 overs)	v	Leicestershire Foxes; 136 (29.4 overs)
David Warner 74 (78); Abdul Razzaq 3/39 (9 overs)		Greg Smith 44 (59); Clint McKay 4/31 (7 overs)

Australians won by 102 runs (D/L method)
Grace Road, Leicester
Umpires: Ben Debenham (Eng) and Peter Hartley (Eng)

- Leicestershire Foxes won the toss and elected to field.
- Match reduced to 41 overs per side due to rain.
- James Sykes (Leics) made his List A debut.

==== 50-over: Essex Eagles v Australians ====
26 June 2012
14:00 (D/N)
Scorecard

Australians; 313/9 (50 overs)	v	Essex Eagles; 134 (32.4 overs)
Michael Clarke 76 (73); Reece Topley 4/46 (8 overs)		James Foster 41 (36); Pat Cummins 3/26 (7 overs)

Australians won by 179 runs
County Ground, Chelmsford
Umpires: Nick Cook and David Millns (Eng)
Player of the match: Reece Topley (Essx)

- Australians won the toss and elected to bat.

=== ODI series ===
==== 1st ODI ====
29 June 2012
10:45
Scorecard

England; 272/5 (50 overs)	v	Australia; 257/9 (50 overs)
Eoin Morgan 89* (63); Clint McKay 1/43 (10 overs)		Michael Clarke 61 (67); Steven Finn 2/47 (10 overs); Stuart Broad 2/47 (10 overs)

England won by 15 runs
Lord's, London
Umpires: Aleem Dar (Pak) and Richard Kettleborough (Eng)
Player of the match: Eoin Morgan (Eng)

- Australia won the toss and elected to field.
- Rain during the England innings delayed play by an hour.
- Aleem Dar stood in his 150th ODI.
- Michael Clarke passed 7,000 ODI runs.
- Brett Lee (Aus) equalled the record for the most ODI wickets taken for Australia (380).
- England beat Australia for the first time in an ODI at Lord's since 1997.

==== 2nd ODI ====
1 July 2012
10:45
Scorecard

Australia; 251/7 (50 overs)	v	England; 252/4 (45.4 overs)
Shane Watson 66 (80); Tim Bresnan 2/50 (8 overs)		Ravi Bopara 82 (85); Michael Clarke 1/13 (2 overs)

England won by 6 wickets
The Oval, London
Umpires: Marais Erasmus (SA) and Richard Illingworth (Eng)
Player of the match: Ravi Bopara (Eng)

- Australia won the toss and elected to bat.
- Rain interrupted the Australia innings and wet ground delayed the start of the England innings, but there was no loss of overs.

==== 3rd ODI ====
4 July 2012
14:00 (D/N)
Scorecard

England	v	Australia

Match abandoned without a ball bowled
Edgbaston, Birmingham
Umpires: Aleem Dar (Pak) and Rob Bailey (Eng)

- No toss.
- Rain prevented play.
- The lack of a result ensures that Australia retain the no. 1 spot in the ICC's World ODI Rankings

==== 4th ODI ====
7 July 2012
10:45
Scorecard

Australia; 200/9 (50 overs)	v	England; 201/2 (47.5 overs)
David Hussey 70 (73); Steven Finn 4/37 (10 overs)		Ian Bell 69 (94); Clint McKay 2/29 (10 overs)

England won by 8 wickets
Durham ICG, Chester-le-Street
Umpires: Marais Erasmus (SA) and Nigel Llong (Eng)
Player of the match: Steven Finn (Eng)

- England won the toss and elected to field.

==== 5th ODI ====
10 July 2012
14:00 (D/N)
Scorecard

Australia; 145/7 (32 overs)	v	England; 138/3 (27.1 overs)
George Bailey 46* (41); Ravi Bopara 2/8 (4 overs)		Alastair Cook 58 (78); Michael Clarke 1/14 (3 overs)

England won by 7 wickets (D/L)
Old Trafford, Manchester
Umpires: Aleem Dar (Pak) and Ian Gould (Eng)
Player of the match: Ravi Bopara (Eng)

- England won the toss and elected to field.
- Rain delayed the start of the match until 17:30, reducing the match to 32 overs per side. Further rain reduced the England innings to 29 overs, with a target of 138 runs.
