= April 2012 in sports =

<<	April 2012					>>
Su	Mo	Tu	We	Th	Fr	Sa
1	2	3	4	5	6	7
8	9	10	11	12	13	14
15	16	17	18	19	20	21
22	23	24	25	26	27	28
29	30
Sports

This list shows notable sports-related deaths, events, and notable outcomes that occurred in April of 2012.

== Current sporting seasons ==
=== Auto racing 2012 ===
- World Rally Championship

=== Basketball 2012 ===
- NBA
- NCAA Division I men
- NCAA Division I women
- Euroleague
- EuroLeague Women
- Eurocup
- EuroChallenge
- ASEAN Basketball League
- Australia
- France
- Germany
- Greece
- Israel
- Italy
- Philippines
  - Commissioner's Cup
- Russia
- Spain
- Turkey

=== Cricket 2012 ===
- Australia:
  - Sheffield Shield
  - Ryobi One-Day Cup

=== Football (soccer) 2012 ===
National teams competitions

- 2014 FIFA World Cup qualification
- UEFA Women's Euro 2013 qualifying

International clubs competitions

- UEFA (Europe) Champions League
- UEFA Europa League
- UEFA Women's Champions League
- Copa Libertadores (South America)
- CONCACAF (North & Central America) Champions League
- OFC (Oceania) Champions League

Domestic (national) competitions

- Australia
- England
- France
- Germany
- Iran
- Italy
- Portugal
- Russia
- Scotland
- Spain

=== Ice hockey 2012 ===
- National Hockey League
- Kontinental Hockey League
- Czech Extraliga
- Elitserien
- Canadian Hockey League:
  - OHL, QMJHL, WHL
- NCAA Division I men
- NCAA Division I women

=== Rugby union 2012 ===
- Heineken Cup
- Amlin Challenge Cup
- Aviva Premiership
- RaboDirect Pro12
- LV= Cup
- Top 14
- Sevens World Series

=== Snooker 2012 ===
- Players Tour Championship

=== Tennis 2012 ===
- ATP World Tour
- WTA Tour

=== Volleyball 2012 ===
International clubs competitions

- Men's CEV Champions League
- Women's CEV Champions League

=== Winter sports ===
- Alpine Skiing World Cup
- Biathlon World Cup
- Bobsleigh World Cup
- Cross-Country Skiing World Cup
- Freestyle Skiing World Cup
- Luge World Cup
- Nordic Combined World Cup
- Short Track Speed Skating World Cup
- Skeleton World Cup
- Ski Jumping World Cup
- Snowboard World Cup
- Speed Skating World Cup

== Days of the month ==
=== April 30, 2012 (Monday) ===
==== Field hockey ====
- Men's Olympic Qualifying Tournament in Kakamigahara, Japan, matchday 3:
  - Austria 2–1 Czech Republic
  - Brazil 0–11 Japan
  - China 2–5 South Africa

=== April 29, 2012 (Sunday) ===
==== Auto racing ====
- World Rally Championship:
  - Rally Argentina: (1) Sébastien Loeb (FRA) (Citroën DS3 WRC) (2) Mikko Hirvonen (FIN) (Citroën DS3 WRC) (3) Mads Østberg (NOR) (Ford Fiesta RS WRC)
    - Loeb wins his 70th rally.

==== Cycling ====
- UCI World Tour:
  - Tour de Romandie, stage 5: (1) Bradley Wiggins (GBR) (Team Sky) (2) Andrew Talansky (USA) (Garmin–Barracuda) (3) Richie Porte (AUS) (Team Sky)
    - Final general classification: (gold) Wiggins (silver) Talansky (bronze) Rui Costa (POR) (Movistar Team)
      - UCI World Tour standings (after 14 of 28 races): (1) Tom Boonen (BEL) (Omega Pharma–Quick-Step) 366 points (2) Vincenzo Nibali (ITA) (Liquigas–Cannondale) 272 (3) Samuel Sánchez (ESP) (Euskaltel–Euskadi) 252

==== Field hockey ====
- Women's Olympic Qualifying Tournament in Kakamigahara, Japan, matchday 3:
  - Chile 0–0 Japan
  - Austria 0–5 Azerbaijan
  - Belarus 2–2 Malaysia

==== Golf ====
- PGA Tour:
  - Zurich Classic of New Orleans in New Orleans, United States:
    - Winner: Jason Dufner (USA) 269 PO (−19)
      - Dufner wins his first PGA title.
- European Tour:
  - Ballantine's Championship in Icheon, South Korea:
    - Winner: Bernd Wiesberger (AUT) 270 (–18)
      - Wiesberger wins his first European Tour title.
- LPGA Tour:
  - Mobile Bay LPGA Classic in Mobile, Alabama, United States:
    - Winner: Stacy Lewis (USA) 271 (–17)
      - Lewis wins her second LPGA Tour title.

==== Motorcycle racing ====
- MotoGP:
  - Spanish Grand Prix in Jerez, Spain (ESP unless stated):
    - Moto GP: (1) Casey Stoner (AUS) (Honda) (2) Jorge Lorenzo (Yamaha) (3) Dani Pedrosa (Honda)
    - Moto2: (1) Pol Espargaró (Kalex) (2) Marc Márquez (Suter) (3) Thomas Lüthi (SWI) (Suter)
    - Moto3: (1) Romano Fenati (ITA) (FTR–Honda) (2) Luis Salom (Kalex–KTM) (3) Sandro Cortese (GER) (KTM)

==== Tennis ====
- ATP World Tour:
  - Barcelona Open Banc Sabadell in Barcelona, Spain:
    - Final: **Rafael Nadal** (ESP) def. David Ferrer (ESP) 7–6 (1), 7–5
      - Nadal wins his 7th Barcelona Open title and his 48th ATP title.
  - BRD Năstase Țiriac Trophy in Bucharest, Romania:
    - Final: **Gilles Simon** (FRA) def. Fabio Fognini (ITA) 6–4, 6–3
      - Simon wins his 3rd Bucharest Open title and his 10th ATP title.
- WTA Tour:
  - Porsche Tennis Grand Prix in Stuttgart, Germany:
    - Final: **Maria Sharapova** (RUS) def. Victoria Azarenka (BLR) 6–1, 6–4
      - Sharapova wins her 25th WTA title.
  - Grand Prix SAR La Princesse Lalla Meryem in Fes, Morocco;
    - Final: **Kiki Bertens** (NED) def. Laura Pous Tió (ESP) 7–5, 6–0
      - Bertens wins her first WTA title.

=== April 28, 2012 (Saturday) ===
==== Auto racing ====
- Sprint Cup Series:
  - Capital City 400 in Richmond, Virginia: (1) (Nevada) Kyle Busch (Toyota; Joe Gibbs Racing) (2) (North Carolina) Dale Earnhardt Jr. (Chevrolet; Hendrick Motorsports) (3) (Indiana) Tony Stewart (Chevrolet; Stewart–Haas Racing)

==== Field hockey ====
- Men's Olympic Qualifying Tournament in Kakamigahara, Japan, matchday 2:
  - South Africa 6–2 Czech Republic
  - Brazil 0–8 China
  - Japan 4–1 Austria

=== April 27, 2012 (Friday) ===
==== Auto racing ====
- Nationwide Series:
  - Virginia 529 College Savings 250 in Richmond, Virginia: (1) (Nevada) Kurt Busch (Toyota; Kyle Busch Motorsports) (2) (Florida) Denny Hamlin (Toyota; Joe Gibbs Racing) (3) (California) Kevin Harvick (Chevrolet; Richard Childress Racing)

==== Field hockey ====
- Women's Olympic Qualifying Tournament in Kakamigahara, Japan, matchday 2:
  - Azerbaijan 3–0 Belarus
  - Japan 8–0 Malaysia
  - Austria 0–3 Chile

=== April 26, 2012 (Thursday) ===
==== Field hockey ====
- Men's Olympic Qualifying Tournament in Kakamigahara, Japan, matchday 1:
  - China 1–0 Austria
  - Japan 6–0 Czech Republic
  - South Africa 11–1 Brazil

==== Football (soccer) ====
- UEFA Europa League semi-finals, second leg (first leg scores in parentheses):
  - Valencia (Spain) 0–1 (2–4) (Spain) **Atlético Madrid**. Atlético Madrid win 5–2 on aggregate.
  - **Athletic Bilbao** (Spain) 3–1 (1–2) (Portugal) Sporting CP. Athletic Bilbao win 4–3 on aggregate.

=== April 25, 2012 (Wednesday) ===
==== Field hockey ====
- Women's Olympic Qualifying Tournament in Kakamigahara, Japan, matchday 1:
  - Chile 1–3 Belarus
  - Japan 7–0 Austria
  - Azerbaijan 4–0 Malaysia

==== Football (soccer) ====
- UEFA Champions League semi-finals, second leg (first leg score in parentheses): Real Madrid (Spain) 2–1 (a.e.t.) (1–2) (Germany) **Bayern Munich**. 3–3 on aggregate; Bayern Munich win 3–1 on penalties.
- AFC Cup group stage Matchday 5:
  - Group A:
    - Al-Suwaiq (Oman) 1–5 (Kuwait) Al-Qadsia
    - Al-Ittihad (Syria) 1–4 (Jordan) Al-Faisaly
  - Group B:
    - Al-Oruba (Yemen) 4–1 (India) East Bengal
    - Kazma (Kuwait) 1–2 (Iraq) Arbil
  - Group E:
    - Al-Zawra'a (Iraq) 2–1 (Syria) Al-Shorta
    - Safa (Lebanon) 1–0 (Yemen) Al-Tilal
  - Group F:
    - Tampines Rovers (Singapore) 0–0 (Hong Kong) Kitchee
    - Terengganu (Malaysia) 6–2 (Vietnam) Song Lam Nghe An
- CONCACAF Champions League Finals second leg (first leg score in parentheses): Santos Laguna (Mexico) 2–1 (0–2) (Mexico) **Monterrey**. Monterrey win 3–2 on aggregate.
  - Monterrey win the title for the second time.
- Copa Libertadores Round of 16, first leg:
  - Internacional (Brazil) 0–0 (Brazil) Fluminense
  - Bolívar (Bolivia) 2–1 (Brazil) Santos
- UEFA Women's Euro 2013 qualifying:
  - Group 3: Northern Ireland 0–1 Hungary

=== April 24, 2012 (Tuesday) ===
==== Football (soccer) ====
- UEFA Champions League semi-finals, second leg (first leg score in parentheses): Barcelona (Spain) 2–2 (0–1) (England) **Chelsea**. Chelsea win 3–2 on aggregate.
- AFC Cup group stage, matchday 5:
  - Group C:
    - VB (Maldives) 0–1 (Lebanon) Al-Ahed
    - Al-Ettifaq (Saudi Arabia) 2–2 Al-Kuwait
  - Group D:
    - Salgaocar (India) 3–1 (Oman) Al-Oruba
    - Al-Wehdat (Jordan) 3–1 (Uzbekistan) Neftchi Farg'ona
  - Group G:
    - Chonburi (Thailand) 1–0 (Myanmar) Yangon United
    - Citizen (Hong Kong) 1–2 (Singapore) Home United
  - Group H:
    - Ayeyawady United (Myanmar) 0–3 (Indonesia) Arema
    - Navibank Sài Gòn (Vietnam) 1–2 (Malaysia) Kelantan

=== April 22, 2012 (Sunday) ===
==== Auto racing ====
- Formula One:
  - Bahrain Grand Prix in Sakhir, Bahrain: (1) Sebastian Vettel (GER) (Red Bull–Renault) (2) Kimi Räikkönen (FIN) (Lotus-Renault) (3) Romain Grosjean (FRA) (Lotus-Renault)
- Sprint Cup Series:
  - STP 400 in Kansas City, Kansas: (1) (Florida) Denny Hamlin (Toyota; Joe Gibbs Racing) (2) (New Jersey) Martin Truex Jr. (Toyota; Michael Waltrip Racing) (3) (California) Jimmie Johnson (Chevrolet; Hendrick Motorsports)

==== Cycling ====
- UCI World Tour:
  - Liège–Bastogne–Liège: (gold) Maxim Iglinsky (KAZ) (Astana) (silver) Vincenzo Nibali (ITA) (Liquigas–Cannondale) (bronze) Enrico Gasparotto (ITA) (Astana)
    - UCI World Tour standings (after 13 of 28 races): (1) Tom Boonen (BEL) (Omega Pharma–Quick-Step) 366 points (2) Nibali 272 (3) Samuel Sánchez (ESP) (Euskaltel–Euskadi) 252

==== Equestrianism ====
- Show Jumping World Cup:
  - World Cup Final in 's-Hertogenbosch, Netherlands: (gold) Rich Fellers (USA) on Flexible (silver) Steve Guerdat (SUI) on Nino des Buissonnets (bronze) Pius Schwizer (SUI) on Ulysse & Carlina

==== Golf ====
- PGA Tour:
  - Valero Texas Open in San Antonio:
    - Winner: Ben Curtis (USA) 280 (−8)
      - Curtis wins his fourth PGA Tour title.
- European Tour:
  - Volvo China Open in Tianjin, China:
    - Winner: Branden Grace (RSA) 267 (−21)
      - Grace wins his third European Tour title.

==== Ice hockey ====
- World U18 Championship:
  - Bronze medal game: Finland 4–5 (bronze) **Canada**
  - Final: (silver) Sweden 0–7 (gold) **United States**
    - The United States win their fourth consecutive title, and their seventh overall.

==== Tennis ====
- ATP World Tour:
  - Monte-Carlo Masters:
    - Final: **Rafael Nadal** (ESP) def. Novak Djokovic (SRB) 6–3, 6–1
      - Nadal wins in Monte Carlo for the eighth successive year, winning his 20th Masters 1000 title and his 47th ATP Tour title.
- WTA Tour:
  - Fed Cup semifinals:
    - Russia 2–3 **Serbia**
      - Ana Ivanovic (SRB) def. Anastasia Pavlyuchenkova (GER) 3–6, 6–0, 6–3
      - Jelena Janković (SRB) def. Svetlana Kuznetsova (RUS) 6–1, 6–4
      - Anastasia Pavlyuchenkova/Elena Vesnina (RUS) def. Aleksandra Krunić/Bojana Jovanovski (SRB) 6–4, 6–0
    - Italy 1–4 **Czech Republic**
      - Petra Kvitová (CZE) def. Francesca Schiavone (ITA) 6–4, 7–6(1)
      - Sara Errani (ITA) def. Andrea Hlaváčková (CZE) 2–6, 6–2, 6–2
      - Andrea Hlaváčková/Lucie Hradecká (CZE) def. Sara Errani/Flavia Pennetta (ITA) 6–5 retired

==== Water polo ====
- Women's Olympic Games Qualification Tournament:
  - Bronze medal game: Hungary 13–18 (bronze) **Russia**
  - Final: (gold) **Spain** 9–5 (silver) Italy

=== April 21, 2012 (Saturday) ===
==== Baseball ====
- Major League Baseball: Chicago White Sox 4, Seattle Mariners 0
  - White Sox pitcher Philip Humber throws the 21st perfect game in Major League Baseball history; the first since Roy Halladay on May 29, 2010.

==== Equestrianism ====
- Dressage World Cup:
  - World Cup Final in 's-Hertogenbosch, Netherlands: (gold) Adelinde Cornelissen (NED) on Parzival (silver) Helen Langehanenberg (GER) on Damon Hill NRW (bronze) Valentina Truppa (ITA) on Eremo del Castegno

==== Golf ====
- LPGA Tour:
  - LPGA Lotte Championship in Kapolei, Hawaii:
    - Winner: Ai Miyazato (JPN) 276 (−12)
      - Miyazato wins her eighth LPGA Tour title.

==== Mixed martial arts ====
- UFC 145 in Atlanta, Georgia, United States (USA unless stated):
  - Lightweight bout: **Mark Bocek** (CAN) def. John Alessio (CAN) via unanimous decision (30–27, 29–28, 30–27)
  - Featherweight bout: **Eddie Yagin** def. Mark Hominick (CAN) via split decision (29–28, 28–29, 29–28)
  - Bantamweight bout: **Michael McDonald** def. Miguel Torres via KO (punches)
  - Heavyweight bout: **Ben Rothwell** def. Brendan Schaub via KO (punches)
  - Welterweight bout: **Rory MacDonald** (CAN) def. Che Mills (ENG) via TKO (punches)
  - Light Heavyweight Championship bout: **Jon Jones** (c) def. Rashad Evans via unanimous decision (49–46, 49–46, 50–45)

==== Tennis ====
- WTA Tour:
  - Fed Cup semifinals:
    - Russia 1–1 Serbia
      - Jelena Janković (SRB) def. Anastasia Pavlyuchenkova (RUS) 6–4, 6–3
      - Svetlana Kuznetsova (RUS) def. Ana Ivanovic (SRB) 6–2, 2–6, 6–4
    - Italy 0–2 Czech Republic
      - Lucie Šafářová (CZE) def. Francesca Schiavone (ITA) 7–6(3), 6–1
      - Petra Kvitová (CZE) def. Sara Errani (ITA) 6–4, 6–3

==== Water polo ====
- Women's Olympic Games Qualification Tournament Semi-finals in Trieste, Italy:
  - Hungary 8–10 **Spain**
  - Russia 13–14 **Italy**

=== April 20, 2012 (Friday) ===
==== Baseball ====
- Major League Baseball: Cincinnati Reds 9, Chicago Cubs 4
  - The Reds become the sixth franchise to record 10,000 wins in Major League Baseball.

==== Ice hockey ====
- World U18 Championship Semifinals in Brno, Czech Republic:
  - **Sweden** 7–3 Finland
  - **United States** 2–1 Canada

==== Water polo ====
- Women's Olympic Games Qualification Tournament Quarter-finals in Trieste, Italy (winners qualify for the Olympic Games):
  - **Hungary** 18–5 Kazakhstan
  - **Russia** 7–6 Canada
  - **Spain** 9–7 Greece
  - **Italy** 7–6 Netherlands

=== April 19, 2012 (Thursday) ===
==== Football (soccer) ====
- UEFA Europa League semi-finals, first leg:
  - Atlético Madrid (Spain) 4–2 (Spain) Valencia
  - Sporting CP (Portugal) 2–1 (Spain) Athletic Bilbao
- 2012 Copa Libertadores second stage, final matchday (teams in **bold** advance to the Round of 16):
  - Group 1:
    - Juan Aurich (Peru) 1–0 **(Brazil) Internacional**
    - **Santos** (Brazil) 2–0 (Bolivia) The Strongest
      - Standings: Santos 13 points, Internacional 8, The Strongest 7, Juan Aurich 6.
  - Group 8:
    - **Universidad de Chile** 2–1 (Colombia) **Atlético Nacional**
    - Peñarol (Uruguay) 4–2 (Argentina) Godoy Cruz
      - Standings: Universidad de Chile 13 points, Atlético Nacional 11, Godoy Cruz 5, Peñarol 4.

==== Ice hockey ====
- World U18 Championship Quarterfinals:
  - **Finland** 8–0 Germany
  - Russia 2–4 **Canada**

=== April 18, 2012 (Wednesday) ===
==== Cycling ====
- UCI World Tour:
  - La Flèche Wallonne: (gold) Joaquim Rodríguez (ESP) (Team Katusha) (silver) Michael Albasini (SUI) (GreenEDGE) (bronze) Philippe Gilbert (BEL) (BMC Racing Team)
    - UCI World Tour standings (after 12 of 28 races): (1) Tom Boonen (BEL) (Omega Pharma–Quick-Step) 366 points (2) Peter Sagan (SVK) (Liquigas–Cannondale) 229 (3) Rodríguez & Samuel Sánchez (ESP) (Euskaltel–Euskadi) 222
- UCI Women's Road World Cup:
  - La Flèche Wallonne: (gold) Evelyn Stevens (USA) (silver) Marianne Vos (NED) (bronze) Linda Villumsen (NZL)

==== Football (soccer) ====
- UEFA Champions League semi-finals, first leg: Chelsea (England) 1–0 (Spain) Barcelona
- Copa Libertadores second stage, final matchday (teams in **bold** advance to the Round of 16):
  - Group 4:
    - Arsenal (Argentina) 1–2 (Brazil) **Fluminense**
    - **Boca Juniors** (Argentina) 2–0 (Venezuela) Zamora
      - Standings: Fluminense 15 points, Boca Juniors 13, Arsenal 6, Zamora 1.
  - Group 6:
    - **Corinthians** (Brazil) 6–0 (Venezuela) Deportivo Táchira
    - **Cruz Azul** (Mexico) 4–1 (Paraguay) Nacional
      - Standings: Corinthians 14 points, Cruz Azul 11, Nacional 4, Deportivo Táchira 3.
- CONCACAF Champions League Finals, first leg: Monterrey (Mexico) 2–0 (Mexico) Santos Laguna
- AFC Champions League group stage, matchday 4:
  - Group A:
    - Nasaf Qarshi (Uzbekistan) 0–1 (Qatar) Al-Rayyan
    - Al-Jazira (United Arab Emirates) 1–1 (Iran) Esteghlal
  - Group C:
    - Lekhwiya (Qatar) 1–0 (Iran) Sepahan
    - Al-Ahli (Saudi Arabia) 3–1 (United Arab Emirates) Al-Nasr
  - Group E:
    - Adelaide United (Australia) 1–0 (South Korea) Pohang Steelers
    - Bunyodkor (Uzbekistan) 3–2 (Japan) Gamba Osaka
  - Group G:
    - Nagoya Grampus (Japan) 0–0 (China) Tianjin Teda
    - Seongnam Ilhwa Chunma (South Korea) 5–0 (Australia) Central Coast Mariners

=== April 17, 2012 (Tuesday) ===
==== Baseball ====
- Major League Baseball: Colorado Rockies 5, San Diego Padres 3
  - Rockies pitcher Jamie Moyer earns the win to become the oldest pitcher to win a game in Major League Baseball history at the age of 49 years, 151 days. Moyer's mark surpassed Jack Quinn's previous record of 49 years, 70 days from September 13, 1932.

==== Football (soccer) ====
- UEFA Champions League semi-finals, first leg: Bayern Munich (Germany) 2–1 (Spain) Real Madrid
- Copa Libertadores second stage, final matchday (teams in **bold** advance to the Round of 16):
  - Group 3:
    - Junior (Colombia) 2–1 (Chile) **Unión Española**
    - **Bolívar** (Bolivia) 3–0 (Chile) Universidad Católica
      - Standings: Unión Española, Bolívar 10 points, Junior 7, Universidad Católica 6.
  - Group 7:
    - **Vélez Sársfield** (Argentina) 1–3 (Uruguay) Defensor Sporting
    - **Deportivo Quito** (Ecuador) 5–0 (Mexico) Guadalajara
      - Standings: Velez Sársfield 12 points, Deportivo Quito 10, Defensor Sporting 9, Guadalajara 4.
- AFC Champions League group stage, matchday 4:
  - Group B:
    - Bani Yas (United Arab Emirates) 0–0 (Saudi Arabia) Al-Ittihad
    - Al-Arabi (Qatar) 0–1 (Uzbekistan) Pakhtakor
  - Group D:
    - Persepolis (Iran) 1–1 (Qatar) Al-Gharafa
    - Al-Hilal (Saudi Arabia) 2–1 (United Arab Emirates) Al-Shabab
  - Group F:
    - Brisbane Roar (Australia) 1–2 (South Korea) Ulsan Hyundai
    - FC Tokyo (Japan) 3–0 (China) Beijing Guoan
  - Group H:
    - Jeonbuk Hyundai Motors (South Korea) 3–2 (Thailand) Buriram United
    - Guangzhou Evergrande (China) 3–1 (Japan) Kashiwa Reysol

==== Ice hockey ====
- World U18 Championship Preliminary round (teams in **bold** advance to the semifinals, teams in italics advance to the quarterfinals):
  - Group A:
    - Czech Republic 2–6 Finland
    - **United States** 5–3 Canada
      - Standings: United States 12 points, Finland 9, Canada 6, Czech Republic 3, Denmark 0.
  - Group B:
    - **Sweden** 2–0 Russia
    - Switzerland 2–6 Germany
      - Standings: Sweden 12 points, Russia, Germany, Latvia 6, Switzerland 0.

=== April 16, 2012 (Monday) ===
==== Ice hockey ====
- World U18 Championship Preliminary round:
  - Group A:
    - Canada 6–2 Czech Republic
    - Finland 5–1 Denmark
  - Group B:
    - Germany 4–5 Latvia
    - Russia 6–0 Switzerland

=== April 15, 2012 (Sunday) ===
==== Auto racing ====
- Formula One:
  - Chinese Grand Prix in Shanghai, China: (1) Nico Rosberg (GER) (Mercedes) (2) Jenson Button (GBR) (McLaren–Mercedes) (3) Lewis Hamilton (GBR) (McLaren-Mercedes)
- IndyCar Series:
  - Toyota Grand Prix of Long Beach in Long Beach, California: (1) Will Power (AUS) (Team Penske) (2) Simon Pagenaud (FRA) (Schmidt Hamilton Motorsports) (3) James Hinchcliffe (CAN) (Andretti Autosport)

==== Basketball ====
- Eurocup Basketball Final Four in Khimki, Russia:
  - Third place game: (bronze) **Lietuvos Rytas (Lithuania)** 71–62 (Russia) Spartak St. Petersburg
  - Final: (gold) **Khimki** (Russia) 77–68 (silver) (Spain) Valencia Basket
    - Khimki win the title for the first time, becoming the second consecutive, and third overall, Russian team to win the tournament.

==== Cycling ====
- UCI World Tour:
  - Amstel Gold Race: (gold) Enrico Gasparotto (ITA) (Astana) (silver) Jelle Vanendert (BEL) (Lotto–Belisol) (bronze) Peter Sagan (SVK) (Liquigas–Cannondale)
    - UCI World Tour standings (after 11 of 28 races): (1) Tom Boonen (BEL) (Omega Pharma–Quick-Step) 366 points (2) Sagan 229 (3) Samuel Sánchez (ESP) (Euskaltel–Euskadi) 222

==== Football (soccer) ====
- UEFA Women's Champions League semifinals, first leg:
  - Arsenal (England) 1–2 (Germany) 1. FFC Frankfurt
  - Lyon (France) 5–1 (Germany) Turbine Potsdam

==== Ice hockey ====
- World U18 Championship Preliminary round:
  - Group A: Denmark 0–4 United States
  - Group B: Latvia 1–3 Sweden

==== Tennis ====
- ATP World Tour:
  - U.S. Men's Clay Court Championships in Houston, Texas, United States:
    - Final: **Juan Mónaco** (ARG) def. John Isner (USA) 6–2, 3–6, 6–3
      - Mónaco wins his fifth ATP Tour title.
  - Grand Prix Hassan II in Casablanca, Morocco:
    - Final: **Pablo Andújar** (ESP) def. Albert Ramos (ESP) 6–1, 7–6(5)
      - Andújar defends his Casablanca title, winning his second ATP Tour title.
- WTA Tour:
  - Barcelona Ladies Open in Barcelona, Spain:
    - Final: **Sara Errani** (ITA) def. Dominika Cibulková (SVK) 6–2, 6–2
      - Errani wins her fourth WTA Tour title.
  - e-Boks Open in Farum, Denmark:
    - Final: **Angelique Kerber** (GER) def. Caroline Wozniacki (DEN) 6–4, 6–4
      - Kerber wins her second WTA Tour title.

=== April 14, 2012 (Saturday) ===
==== Auto racing ====
- Sprint Cup Series:
  - Samsung Mobile 500 in Fort Worth, Texas: (1) (Washington (state)) Greg Biffle (Ford; Roush Fenway Racing) (2) (California) Jimmie Johnson (Chevrolet; Hendrick Motorsports) (3) (Arkansas) Mark Martin (Toyota; Michael Waltrip Racing)

==== Horse racing ====
- Grand National in Aintree, England: (gold) Neptune Collonges (trainer: Paul Nicholls; jockey: Daryl Jacob) (silver) Sunnyhillboy (trainer: Jonjo O'Neill; jockey: Richie McLernon) (bronze) Seabass (trainer: Ted Walsh; jockey: Katie Walsh)

==== Ice hockey ====
- Women's World Championship:
  - Bronze medal game: (bronze) **Switzerland** 6–2 Finland
  - Final: (silver) United States 4–5 (gold) **Canada**
    - Canada win the title for the tenth time.
- World U18 Championship Preliminary round:
  - Group A:
    - United States 5–0 Czech Republic
    - Canada 2–4 Finland
  - Group B:
    - Russia 2–4 Germany
    - Sweden 7–2 Switzerland

==== Mixed martial arts ====
- UFC on Fuel TV: Gustafsson vs. Silva in Stockholm, Sweden:
  - Bantamweight bout: **Brad Pickett** (ENG) def. Damacio Page (USA) via submission (rear-naked choke)
  - Welterweight bout: **John Maguire** (ENG) def. DaMarques Johnson (USA) via submission (armbar)
  - Featherweight bout: **Dennis Siver** (GER) def. Diego Nunes (BRA) via unanimous decision (29–28, 29–28, 29–28)
  - Welterweight bout: **Siyar Bahadurzada** (AFG) def. Paulo Thiago (BRA) via KO (punch)
  - Middleweight bout: **Brian Stann** (USA) def. Alessio Sakara (ITA) via KO (punches)
  - Light Heavyweight bout: **Alexander Gustafsson** (SWE) def. Thiago Silva (BRA) via unanimous decision (30–27, 30–27, 29–28)

=== April 13, 2012 (Friday) ===
==== Ice hockey ====
- Women's World Championship Semifinals:
  - Canada 5–1 Finland
  - United States 10–0 Switzerland
- World U18 Championship Preliminary round:
  - Group A: Czech Republic 8–4 Denmark
  - Group B: Switzerland 2–4 Latvia

=== April 12, 2012 (Thursday) ===
==== Boxing ====
- Asian Olympic Qualification Tournament in Astana, Kazakhstan:
  - Light flyweight: **Birzhan Zhakypov** (KAZ) def. Naoya Inoue (JPN) 16–11. Zhakypov qualifies for the Olympics.
  - Flyweight: **Ilyas Suleimenov** (KAZ) def. Nyambayaryn Tögstsogt (MGL) 18–14. Suleimenov and Tögstsogt, along with the semifinalists Pak Jong-Chol (PRK) and Katsuaki Susa (JPN), qualify for the Olympics.
  - Bantamweight: **Shiva Thapa** (IND) def. Wissam Salamana (SYR) 18–11. Thapa and Salamana, along with third-placed Satoshi Shimizu (JPN) qualify for the Olympics.
  - Lightweight: **Liu Qiang** (CHN) def. Charly Suarez (PHI) 15–11. Liu qualifies for the Olympics.
  - Light welterweight: **Daniyar Yeleussinov** (KAZ) def. Serdar Hudayberdiyev (TKM) by WO. Yeleussinov and Hudayberdiyev, along with the semifinalists Uktamjon Rahmonov (UZB) and Mehdi Tolouti (IRI), qualify for the Olympics.
  - Welterweight: **Maimaitituersun Qiong** (CHN) def. Byambyn Tüvshinbat (MGL) by RSCI. Maimaitituersun and Tüvshinbat, along with third-placed Amin Ghasemipour (IRI), qualify for the Olympics.
  - Middleweight: **Abbos Atoev** (UZB) def. Nursahat Pazziyev (TKM) 4–3. Atoev and Pazziyev, along with the semifinalists Sobirjon Nazarov (TJK) and Vijender Singh (IND), qualify for the Olympics.
  - Light heavyweight: **Sumit Sangwan** (IND) def. Jahon Qurbonov (TJK) 14–9. Sangwan and Qurbonov, along with third-placed Ihab Al-Matbouli (JOR), qualify for the Olympics.
  - Heavyweight: **Ali Mazaheri** (IRI) def. Mohammad Ghossoun (SYR) 14–11. Mazaheri qualifies for the Olympics.
  - Super heavyweight: **Zhang Zhilei** (CHN) def. Soumar Ghossoun (SYR) 10–6. Zhang qualifies for the Olympics.

==== Football (soccer) ====
- Copa Libertadores second stage, matchday 6 (teams in **bold** advance to the Round of 16):
  - Group 2:
    - Flamengo (Brazil) 3–0 (Argentina) **Lanús**
    - Olimpia (Paraguay) 2–3 (Ecuador) **Emelec**
      - Standings: Lanús 10 points, Emelec 9, Flamengo 8, Olimpia 7.
  - Group 5:
    - Nacional (Uruguay) 0–1 (Brazil) **Vasco da Gama**
    - Alianza Lima (Peru) 1–2 (Paraguay) **Libertad**
      - Standings: Libertad, Vasco da Gama 13 points, Nacional 6, Alianza Lima 3.

==== Ice hockey ====
- World U18 Championship Preliminary round, game 1:
  - Group A:
    - Denmark 1–6 Canada
    - Finland 0–4 United States
  - Group B:
    - Latvia 1–6 Russia
    - Germany 1–8 Sweden

=== April 11, 2012 (Wednesday) ===
==== Football (soccer) ====
- AFC Cup group stage, matchday 4:
  - Group A:
    - Al-Ittihad (Syria) 0–2 (Oman) Al-Suwaiq
    - Al-Faisaly (Jordan) 1–1 (Kuwait) Al-Qadsia
  - Group C:
    - Al-Kuwait 1–0 (Lebanon) Al-Ahed
    - Al-Ettifaq (Saudi Arabia) 2–0 (Maldives) VB
  - Group E:
    - Al-Tilal (Yemen) 0–2 (Syria) Al-Shorta
    - Safa (Lebanon) 1–0 (Iraq) Al-Zawra'a
  - Group G:
    - Home United (Singapore) 3–1 (Myanmar) Yangon United
    - Citizen (Hong Kong) 3–3 (Thailand) Chonburi

==== Ice hockey ====
- Women's World Championship Quarterfinals in Burlington, Vermont:
  - Russia 2–5 **Switzerland**
  - **Finland** 2–1 Sweden

=== April 10, 2012 (Tuesday) ===
==== Football (soccer) ====
- AFC Cup group stage, matchday 4:
  - Group B:
    - Arbil (Iraq) 2–0 (India) East Bengal
    - Kazma (Kuwait) 1–1 (Yemen) Al-Oruba
  - Group D:
    - Al-Oruba (Oman) 0–0 (Uzbekistan) Neftchi Farg'ona
    - Salgaocar (India) 1–2 (Jordan) Al-Wehdat
  - Group F:
    - Terengganu (Malaysia) 0–2 (Singapore) Tampines Rovers
    - Song Lam Nghe An (Vietnam) 1–0 (Hong Kong) Kitchee
  - Group H:
    - Arema (Indonesia) 1–3 (Malaysia) Kelantan
    - Ayeyawady United (Myanmar) 2–0 (Vietnam) Navibank Sài Gòn

==== Ice hockey ====
- Women's World Championship in Burlington, Vermont, preliminary round (teams in **bold** advance to the semifinals, teams in italics advance to the quarterfinals):
  - Group A:
    - **Canada** 14–1 Russia
    - Finland 0–11 **United States**
      - Standings: United States 9 points, Canada 6, Finland 3, Russia 0.
  - Group B:
    - Sweden 2–3 Switzerland
    - Germany 2–4 Slovakia
      - Standings: Switzerland 6 points, Sweden 5, Germany 4, Slovakia 3.

=== April 9, 2012 (Monday) ===
==== Football (soccer) ====
- CAF Confederation Cup first round, second leg (first leg score in parentheses): **AS Real Bamako** (Mali) 3–1 (0–1) (The Gambia) Gamtel FC. AS Real Bamako win 3–2 on aggregate.

=== April 8, 2012 (Sunday) ===
==== Curling ====
- World Men's Championship:
  - Bronze medal game: (bronze) **Sweden** 9–8 Norway
  - Gold medal game: (gold) **Canada** 8–7 Scotland
    - Canada win the title for the third successive year and the 34th time overall.

==== Cycling ====
- UCI World Tour:
  - Paris–Roubaix: (gold) Tom Boonen (BEL) (Omega Pharma–Quick-Step) (silver) Sébastien Turgot (FRA) (Team Europcar) (bronze) Alessandro Ballan (ITA) (BMC Racing Team)
    - UCI World Tour standings (after 10 of 28 races): (1) Boonen 366 points (2) Simon Gerrans (AUS) (GreenEDGE) 210 (3) Samuel Sánchez (ESP) (Euskaltel–Euskadi) 208

==== Football (soccer) ====
- CAF Champions League first round, second leg (first leg scores in parentheses):
  - AS Vita Club (Democratic Republic of the Congo) 2–3 (0–0) (Algeria) **ASO Chlef**. ASO Chlef win 3–2 on aggregate.
  - Africa Sports (Ivory Coast) 2–1 (0–1) (Egypt) **Zamalek**. 2–2 on aggregate; Zamalek win on away goals.
  - **Maghreb de Fès** (Morocco) 3–0 (1–1) (Guinea) Horoya AC. Maghreb de Fès win 4–1 on aggregate.
  - **Al-Ahly** (Egypt) 3–0 (0–0) (Ethiopia) Ethiopian Coffee. Al-Ahly win 3–0 on aggregate.
  - **Sunshine Stars** (Nigeria) 3–0 (1–4) (Angola) Recreativo do Libolo. 4–4 on aggregate; Sunshine Stars win on away goals.
  - **Dynamos** (Zimbabwe) 1–0 (2–2) (Mozambique) Liga Muçulmana. Dynamos win 3–2 on aggregate.
  - **Coton Sport** (Cameroon) 1–0 (1–2) (Nigeria) Dolphins. 2–2 on aggregate; Coton Sport win on away goals.
  - Raja Casablanca (Morocco) 3–0 (0–5) (Ghana) **Berekum Chelsea**. Berekum Chelsea win 5–3 on aggregate.
  - **TP Mazembe** (Democratic Republic of the Congo) 6–0 (1–1) (Zambia) Power Dynamos. TP Mazembe win 7–1 on aggregate.
- CAF Confederation Cup first round, second leg (first leg scores in parentheses):
  - **CODM Meknès** (Morocco) 3–0 (2–0) (Guinea) FC Séquence. CODM Meknès win 5–0 on aggregate.
  - **Al-Ahli Shendi** (Sudan) 2–0 (1–0) (Mozambique) Ferroviário de Maputo. Al-Ahli Shendi win 3–0 on aggregate.
  - **Heartland** (Nigeria) 2–1 (0–0) (Cameroon) Unisport Bafang. Heartland win 2–1 on aggregate.
  - **Inter Luanda** (Angola) 2–0 (a.e.t.) (0–2) (Madagascar) Tana FC. 2–2 on aggregate; Inter Luanda win 6–5 on penalties.
  - **Amal Atbara** (Sudan) 0–0 (1–1) (Zimbabwe) Hwange. 1–1 on aggregate; Amal Atbara win on away goals.

==== Golf ====
- Men's major championships:
  - Masters Tournament:
    - Winner: Bubba Watson (USA) 278 (−10)
      - Watson wins his first major title.

==== Handball ====
- Olympics Men's Qualification Tournaments, final matchday (teams in **bold** qualify for the Olympics):
  - Tournament 1 in Alicante, Spain:
    - **Serbia** 26–18 Algeria
    - **Spain** 33–22 Poland
      - Standings: Spain 6 points, Serbia, Poland 3, Algeria 0.
  - Tournament 2 in Gothenburg, Sweden:
    - Brazil 28–27 North Macedonia
    - **Sweden** 26–23 **Hungary**
      - Standings: Sweden 6 points, Hungary 4, Brazil 2, Macedonia 0.
  - Tournament 3 in Varaždin, Croatia:
    - Japan 33–26 Chile
    - **Croatia** 31–28 **Iceland**
      - Standings: Croatia 6 points, Iceland 4, Japan 2, Chile 0.

==== Ice hockey ====
- Women's World Championship in Burlington, Vermont, preliminary round:
  - Group A:
    - Canada 3–2 Finland
    - United States 9–0 Russia
  - Group B:
    - Sweden 2–1 Germany
    - Switzerland 2–1 Slovakia

==== Motorcycle racing ====
- MotoGP:
  - Qatar Grand Prix in Losail, Qatar (ESP unless stated):
    - MotoGP: (1) Jorge Lorenzo (Yamaha) (2) Dani Pedrosa (Honda) (3) Casey Stoner (AUS) (Honda)
    - Moto2: (1) Marc Márquez (Suter) (2) Andrea Iannone (ITA) (Speed Up) (3) Pol Espargaró (Kalex)
    - Moto3: (1) Maverick Viñales (FTR Honda) (2) Romano Fenati (ITA) (FTR Honda) (3) Sandro Cortese (GER) (KTM)

==== Rugby union ====
- Heineken Cup quarter-finals:
  - Munster (Ireland) 16–22 (Ireland) **Ulster**
  - Saracens (England) 3–22 (France) **Clermont Auvergne**
- European Challenge Cup quarter-finals: **Brive** (France) 15–11 (Wales) Scarlets

==== Tennis ====
- Davis Cup World Group Quarterfinals:
  - **Spain** 4–1 Austria
    - David Ferrer (ESP) def. Jürgen Melzer (AUT) 7–5, 6–3, 6–3
    - Nicolás Almagro (ESP) def. Alexander Peya (AUT) 7–5, 7–5
  - France 2–3 **United States**
    - John Isner (USA) def. Jo-Wilfried Tsonga (FRA) 6–3, 7–6(4), 5–7, 6–3
    - Gilles Simon (FRA) def. Ryan Harrison (USA) 6–2, 6–3
  - **Czech Republic** 4–1 Serbia
    - Tomáš Berdych (CZE) def. Janko Tipsarević (SRB) 7–6(6), 7–6(6), 7–6(7)
    - Lukáš Rosol (CZE) def. Viktor Troicki (SRB) 7–6(5), 7–5
  - **Argentina** 4–1 Croatia
    - Juan Martín del Potro (ARG) def. Marin Čilić (CRO) 6–1, 6–2, 6–1
    - Juan Mónaco (ARG) def. Antonio Veić (CRO) 6–1, 6–1
- WTA Tour:
  - Family Circle Cup in Charleston, South Carolina, United States:
    - Final: **Serena Williams** (USA) def. Lucie Šafářová (CZE) 6–0, 6–1
      - Williams wins her second Charleston title, and her 40th WTA title overall.

=== April 7, 2012 (Saturday) ===
==== Cycling ====
- UCI World Tour:
  - Tour of the Basque Country, stage 6: (1) Samuel Sánchez (ESP) (Euskaltel–Euskadi) (2) Bauke Mollema (NED) (Rabobank) (3) Tony Martin (GER) (Omega Pharma–Quick-Step)
    - Final general classification: (gold) Sánchez (silver) Joaquim Rodríguez (ESP) (Team Katusha) (bronze) Mollema

==== Football (soccer) ====
- CAF Champions League first round, second leg (first leg scores in parentheses):
  - **AFAD Djékanou** (Ivory Coast) 3–0 (2–1) (Algeria) JSM Béjaïa. AFAD Djékanou win 5–1 on aggregate.
  - **Al-Merreikh** (Sudan) 3–0 (2–2) (Zimbabwe) FC Platinum. Al-Merreikh win 5–2 on aggregate.
- CAF Confederation Cup first round, second leg (first leg scores in parentheses):
  - US Tshinkunku (Democratic Republic of the Congo) 1–2 (1–1) (Eswatini) **Royal Leopards**. Royal Leopards win 3–2 on aggregate.
  - **Club Africain** (Tunisia) 2–0 (1–1) (Ethiopia) Saint-George SA. Club Africain win 3–1 on aggregate.
  - CS Sfaxien (Tunisia) 0–2 (2–1) (Republic of the Congo) **AC Léopard**. AC Léopard win 3–2 on aggregate.
  - **ENPPI** (Egypt) 4–1 (1–1) (Burundi) LLB Académic. ENPPI win 5–2 on aggregate.
  - **Wydad Casablanca** (Morocco) 4–1 (2–0) (Liberia) Invincible Eleven. Wydad Casablanca win 6–1 on aggregate.

==== Handball ====
- Olympics Men's Qualification Tournaments, matchday 2:
  - Tournament 1 in Alicante, Spain:
    - Serbia 25–25 Poland
    - Algeria 20–28 Spain
  - Tournament 2 in Gothenburg, Sweden:
    - Brazil 27–29 Hungary
    - North Macedonia 23–27 Sweden
  - Tournament 3 in Varaždin, Croatia:
    - Chile 15–35 Croatia
    - Japan 30–41 Iceland

==== Ice hockey ====
- Women's World Championship in Burlington, Vermont, preliminary round:
  - Group A:
    - Finland 5–4 Russia
    - United States 9–2 Canada
  - Group B:
    - Slovakia 1–5 Sweden
    - Switzerland 2–3 Germany

==== Rugby union ====
- Heineken Cup quarter-finals:
  - **Edinburgh** (Scotland) 19–14 (France) Toulouse
  - **Leinster** (Ireland) 34–3 (Wales) Cardiff Blues
- European Challenge Cup quarter-finals: London Wasps (England) 23–26 (France) **Biarritz**

==== Tennis ====
- Davis Cup World Group Quarterfinals
  - Spain 2–1 Austria
    - Oliver Marach/Alexander Peya (AUT) def. Marcel Granollers/Marc López (ESP) 3–6, 6–4, 6–4, 7–6(12)
  - France 1–2 United States
    - Bob Bryan/Mike Bryan (USA) def. Michaël Llodra/Julien Benneteau 6–4, 6–4, 7–6(4)
  - Czech Republic 2–1 Serbia
    - Tomáš Berdych/Radek Štěpánek (CZE) def. Ilija Bozoljac/Nenad Zimonjić (SRB) 6–4, 6–2, 7–6(4)
  - Argentina 2–1 Croatia
    - David Nalbandian/Eduardo Schwank (ARG) def. Marin Čilić/Ivo Karlović 3–6, 7–6(6), 6–3, 6–7(6), 8–6

=== April 6, 2012 (Friday) ===
==== Football (soccer) ====
- CAF Champions League first round, second leg (first leg scores in parentheses):
  - **Al-Hilal** (Sudan) 5–1 (3–0) (Central African Republic) DFC 8ème Arrondissement. Al-Hilal win 8–1 on aggregate.
  - **ÉS Sahel** (Tunisia) 3–2 (0–0) (Rwanda) APR. ES Sahel win 3–2 on aggregate.
  - **Espérance ST** (Tunisia) 3–1 (1–1) (The Gambia) Brikama United. Espérance ST win 4–2 on aggregate.
- CAF Confederation Cup first round, second leg (first leg scores in parentheses):
  - **ASEC Mimosas** (Ivory Coast) 2–0 (2–2) (Burkina Faso) Étoile Filante. ASEC Mimosas win 4–2 on aggregate.
  - **Warri Wolves** (Nigeria) 2–0 (0–0) (Sierra Leone) FC Kallon. Warri Wolves win 2–0 on aggregate.
  - Saint Eloi Lupopo (Democratic Republic of the Congo) 2–2 (2–4) (South Africa) **Black Leopards**. Black Leopards win 6–4 on aggregate.
  - ES Sétif (Algeria) 3–1 (0–2) (Tanzania) **Simba**. 3–3 on aggregate; Simba win on away goals.
  - **Cercle Olympique de Bamako** (Mali) 3–1 (2–3) (Chad) Renaissance FC. Cercle Olympique de Bamako win 5–4 on aggregate.

==== Handball ====
- Olympics Men's Qualification Tournaments:
  - Tournament 1 in Alicante, Spain:
    - Poland 28–27 Algeria
    - Spain 30–27 Serbia
  - Tournament 2 in Gothenburg, Sweden:
    - Hungary 28–26 North Macedonia
    - Sweden 25–20 Brazil
  - Tournament 3 in Varaždin, Croatia:
    - Croatia 36–22 Japan
    - Iceland 25–17 Chile

==== Rugby union ====
- European Challenge Cup quarter-finals: **Toulon** (France) 37–8 (England) Harlequins

==== Tennis ====
- Davis Cup World Group Quarterfinals
  - Spain 2–0 Austria
    - Nicolás Almagro (ESP) def. Jürgen Melzer (AUT) 6–2, 6–2, 6–4
    - David Ferrer (ESP) def. Andreas Haider-Maurer (AUT) 6–1, 6–3, 6–1
  - France 1–1 United States
    - Jo-Wilfried Tsonga (FRA) def. Ryan Harrison (USA) 7–5, 6–2, 2–6, 6–2
    - John Isner (USA) def. Gilles Simon (FRA) 6–3, 6–2, 7–5
  - Czech Republic 1–1 Serbia
    - Tomáš Berdych (CZE) def. Viktor Troicki (SRB) 6–2, 6–1, 6–2
    - Janko Tipsarević (SRB) def. Radek Štěpánek (CZE) 5–7, 6–4, 6–4, 4–6, 9–7
  - Argentina 1–1 Croatia
    - Marin Čilić (CRO) def. David Nalbandian (ARG) 5–7, 6–4, 4–6, 7–6(2), 6–3
    - Juan Martín del Potro (ARG) def. Ivo Karlović (CRO) 6–2, 7–6(7), 6–1

==== Water polo ====
- Olympic Qualification Tournament Quarter-finals in Edmonton, Canada (winners qualify for the Olympic Games).
  - **Montenegro** 19–6 Turkey
  - **Romania** 19–8 Brazil
  - North Macedonia 7–11 **Spain**
  - **Greece** 10–6 Canada

=== April 5, 2012 (Thursday) ===
==== Basketball ====
- Euroleague Quarterfinals, game 5: **Panathinaikos** (Greece) 86–85 (Israel) Maccabi Tel Aviv. Panathinaikos win series 3–2.

==== Football (soccer) ====
- UEFA Europa League quarter-finals, second leg (first leg scores in parentheses):
  - **Valencia** (Spain) 4–0 (1–2) (Netherlands) AZ. Valencia win 5–2 on aggregate.
  - **Athletic Bilbao** (Spain) 2–2 (4–2) (Germany) Schalke 04. Athletic Bilbao win 6–4 on aggregate.
  - Metalist Kharkiv (Ukraine) 1–1 (1–2) (Portugal) **Sporting CP**. Sporting CP win 3–2 on aggregate.
  - Hannover 96 (Germany) 1–2 (1–2) (Spain) **Atlético Madrid**. Atlético Madrid win 4–2 on aggregate.
- Copa Libertadores second stage, matchday 5:
  - Group 1: Juan Aurich (Peru) 1–0 (Bolivia) The Strongest
  - Group 5: Libertad (Paraguay) 2–1 (Uruguay) Nacional
- UEFA Women's Euro 2013 qualifying:
  - Group 2:
    - Spain 13–0 Kazakhstan
    - Switzerland 0–6 Germany
  - Group 4: Scotland 2–1 Republic of Ireland
  - Group 5:
    - Finland 2–0 Slovakia
    - Ukraine 5–0 Estonia
  - Group 6: Netherlands 3–1 Slovenia
  - Group 7: Austria 1–0 Portugal
- OFC Women's Pre-Olympic Tournament, second leg (first leg score in parentheses): Papua New Guinea 0–7 (0–8) **New Zealand**
  - New Zealand win 15–0 on aggregate and qualify for the Olympic Games.

==== Rugby union ====
- European Challenge Cup quarter-finals: **Stade Français** (France) 22–17 (England) Exeter Chiefs

=== April 4, 2012 (Wednesday) ===
==== Football (soccer) ====
- UEFA Champions League quarter-finals, second leg (first leg scores in parentheses):
  - **Real Madrid** (Spain) 5–2 (3–0) (Cyprus) APOEL. Real Madrid win 8–2 on aggregate.
  - **Chelsea** (England) 2–1 (1–0) (Portugal) Benfica. Chelsea win 3–1 on aggregate.
- Copa Libertadores second stage, matchday 5:
  - Group 1: Internacional (Brazil) 1–1 (Brazil) Santos
  - Group 2: Emelec (Ecuador) 3–2 (Brazil) Flamengo
  - Group 3: Junior (Colombia) 3–0 (Chile) Universidad Católica
  - Group 8: Godoy Cruz (Argentina) 0–1 Universidad de Chile
- AFC Champions League group stage, matchday 3:
  - Group B:
    - Pakhtakor (Uzbekistan) 3–1 (Qatar) Al-Arabi
    - Al-Ittihad (Saudi Arabia) 1–0 (United Arab Emirates) Bani Yas
  - Group D:
    - Al-Shabab (United Arab Emirates) 1–1 (Saudi Arabia) Al-Hilal
    - Al-Gharafa (Qatar) 0–3 (Iran) Persepolis
  - Group F:
    - Ulsan Hyundai (South Korea) 1–1 (Australia) Brisbane Roar
    - Beijing Guoan (China) 1–1 (Japan) FC Tokyo
  - Group H:
    - Kashiwa Reysol (Japan) 0–0 (China) Guangzhou Evergrande
    - Buriram United (Thailand) 0–2 (South Korea) Jeonbuk Hyundai Motors
- AFC Cup group stage:
  - Group B:
    - East Bengal (India) 0–2 (Iraq) Arbil
    - Al-Oruba (Yemen) 1–2 (Kuwait) Kazma
  - Group D:
    - Neftchi Farg'ona (Uzbekistan) 3–1 (Oman) Al-Oruba
    - Al-Wehdat (Jordan) 5–0 (India) Salgaocar
  - Group F:
    - Kitchee (Hong Kong) 2–0 (Vietnam) Sông Lam Nghệ An
    - Tampines Rovers (Singapore) 0–1 (Malaysia) Terengganu
  - Group H:
    - Navibank Sài Gòn (Vietnam) 4–1 (Myanmar) Ayeyawady United
    - Kelantan (Malaysia) 3–0 (Indonesia) Arema
- CONCACAF Champions League semifinals, second leg (first leg scores in parentheses):
  - **Santos Laguna** (Mexico) 6–2 (1–1) (Canada) Toronto FC. Santos Laguna win 7–3 on aggregate.
  - UNAM (Mexico) 1–1 (0–3) (Mexico) **Monterrey**. Monterrey win 4–1 on aggregate.
- UEFA Women's Euro 2013 qualifying:
  - Group 1:
    - Russia 0–2 Italy
    - Greece 2–2 North Macedonia
  - Group 3:
    - Hungary 0–5 Norway
    - Belgium 1–0 Iceland
  - Group 4: France 4–0 Wales
  - Group 7: Czech Republic 0–2 Denmark

=== April 3, 2012 (Tuesday) ===
==== Football (soccer) ====
- UEFA Champions League quarter-finals, second leg (first leg scores in parentheses):
  - **Bayern Munich** (Germany) 2–0 (2–0) (France) Marseille. Bayern Munich win 4–0 on aggregate.
  - **Barcelona (Spain)** 3–1 (0–0) (Italy) Milan. Barcelona win 3–1 on aggregate.
- Copa Libertadores second stage, matchday 5:
  - Group 2: Lanús (Argentina) 6–0 (Paraguay) Olimpia
  - Group 5: Alianza Lima (Peru) 1–2 (Brazil) Vasco da Gama
  - Group 6: Deportivo Táchira (Venezuela) 1–1 (Mexico) Cruz Azul
- AFC Champions League group stage, matchday 3:
  - Group A:
    - Esteghlal (Iran) 1–2 (United Arab Emirates) Al-Jazira
    - Al-Rayyan (Qatar) 3–1 (Uzbekistan) Nasaf Qarshi
  - Group C:
    - Sepahan (Iran) 2–1 (Qatar) Lekhwiya
    - Al-Nasr (United Arab Emirates) 1–2 (Saudi Arabia) Al-Ahli
  - Group E:
    - Gamba Osaka (Japan) 3–1 (Uzbekistan) Bunyodkor
    - Pohang Steelers (South Korea) 1–0 (Australia) Adelaide United
  - Group G:
    - Central Coast Mariners (Australia) 1–1 (South Korea) Seongnam Ilhwa Chunma
    - Tianjin Teda (China) 0–3 (Japan) Nagoya Grampus
- AFC Cup group stage, matchday 3:
  - Group A:
    - Al-Suwaiq (Oman) 2–0 (Syria) Al-Ittihad
    - Al-Qadsia (Kuwait) 1–2 (Jordan) Al-Faisaly
  - Group C:
    - Al-Ahed (Lebanon) 0–4 Al-Kuwait
    - VB (Maldives) 3–6 (Saudi Arabia) Al-Ettifaq
  - Group E:
    - Al-Zawra'a (Iraq) 1–0 (Lebanon) Safa
    - Al-Shorta (Syria) 3–0 (Yemen) Al-Tilal
  - Group G:
    - Yangon United (Myanmar) 0–0 (Singapore) Home United
    - Chonburi (Thailand) 2–0 (Hong Kong) Citizen

=== April 1, 2012 (Sunday) ===
==== Auto racing ====
- World Rally Championship:
  - Rally de Portugal: (1) Mads Østberg (NOR) (Ford Fiesta RS WRC) (2) Evgeny Novikov (RUS) (Ford Fiesta RS WRC) (3) Petter Solberg (NOR) (Ford Fiesta RS WRC)
    - Østberg wins his first rally.
- Sprint Cup Series:
  - Goody's Fast Relief 500 in Ridgeway, Virginia: (1) (Indiana) Ryan Newman (Chevrolet; Stewart–Haas Racing) (2) (California) A. J. Allmendinger (Dodge; Penske Racing) (3) (North Carolina) Dale Earnhardt Jr. (Chevrolet; Hendrick Motorsports)
- IndyCar Series:
  - Indy Grand Prix of Alabama in Birmingham, Alabama: (1) Will Power (AUS) (Team Penske) (2) Scott Dixon (NZL) (Chip Ganassi Racing) (3) Hélio Castroneves (BRA) (Team Penske)

==== Basketball ====
- EuroLeague Women:
  - Third place game: Fenerbahçe (Turkey) 68–75 (bronze) (Russia) **UMMC Ekaterinburg**
  - Final: (silver) Rivas Ecópolis (Spain) 52–65 (gold) (Spain) **Ros Casares**
    - Ros Casares win the title for the first time.

==== Cycling ====
- UCI World Tour:
  - Tour of Flanders: (gold) Tom Boonen (BEL) (Omega Pharma–Quick-Step) (silver) Filippo Pozzato (ITA) (Farnese Vini–Selle Italia) (bronze) Alessandro Ballan (ITA) (BMC Racing Team)
- UCI Women's Road World Cup:
  - Tour of Flanders: (gold) Judith Arndt (GER) (silver) Kristin Armstrong (USA) (bronze) Joëlle Numainville (CAN)

==== Football (soccer) ====
- UEFA Women's Euro 2013 qualifying:
  - Group 7: Armenia 2–4 Austria
