= May 2012 in sports =

<<	May 2012					>>
Su	Mo	Tu	We	Th	Fr	Sa
		1	2	3	4	5
6	7	8	9	10	11	12
13	14	15	16	17	18	19
20	21	22	23	24	25	26
27	28	29	30	31
Sports

This list shows notable sports-related deaths, events, and notable outcomes that occurred in May of 2012.

== May 2012 ==
=== May 27, 2012 (Sunday) ===
Equestrianism

- German weekend at the 80th Piazza di Siena horse show in Rome: After a victory of the German show jumping team in the FEI Nations Cup of Italy also the Grand Prix “Città di Roma” going to Germany. Show jumper Ludger Beerbaum and his 11-year-old mare Gotha win this CSIO 5*-Grand Prix. His compatriot Christian Ahlmann was second-placed with his stallion Taloubet Z.

Twenty20 cricket

- The Kolkata Knight Riders win the 2012 Indian Premier League.

Formula One

- Mark Webber wins the 2012 Monaco Grand Prix

=== May 13, 2012 (Sunday) ===
Formula One

- Pastor Maldonado in Williams wins his first Grand Prix, the 2012 Spanish Grand Prix

=== May 9, 2012 (Wednesday) ===
Football (soccer)

- Atlético Madrid win the UEFA Europa League for the second time in three years, with a 3–0 victory in the final over Athletic Bilbao in Bucharest. Radamel Falcao scores two goals, to finish the tournament as top goalscorer for the second successive season. (The Independent)

=== May 5, 2012 (Saturday) ===
Equestrianism

- In the second Global Champions Tour competition of the season in Oliva, Spain, Great Britain's Ben Maher, riding Tripple X III, wins the event ahead of compatriot Michael Whitaker on Viking and Ireland's Denis Lynch, on his horse Abbervail van het Dingeshof.

Field hockey

- Japan qualify for the Olympics after winning the Women's Qualifying Tournament in Kakamigahara, Japan. Japan defeated Austria 5–1 in the final.

=== May 4, 2012 (Friday) ===
Equestrianism

- The Nations Cup Promotional League held two separate events, in Europe and in the Americas. At the Nations Cup of Belgium held in Lummen, the event was won by Italy ahead of Belgium and Canada, who shared second place. In the Nations Cup of Brazil held in Porto Alegre, France prevailed ahead of Brazil and Germany. In the final American League standings, Canada were crowned champions with 30 points, ahead of the United States on 18 and Argentina on 17.

=== May 3, 2012 (Thursday) ===
Field hockey

- At the Women's Olympic Qualifying Tournament in Kakamigahara, Japan, Austria defeat Malaysia 3–1, Japan beat Belarus 4–0, while Chile and Azerbaijan played out a 2–2 draw.

=== May 1, 2012 (Tuesday) ===
Field hockey

- At the Women's Olympic Qualifying Tournament in Kakamigahara, Japan, Chile defeat Malaysia 2–1, Japan beat Azerbaijan 4–1, while Belarus came out 5–0 winners against Austria.

Football (soccer)

- West Bromwich Albion manager Roy Hodgson is named as the new manager of the England national football team, replacing Fabio Capello, who resigned in February. He will take charge of the team, upon the conclusion of the 2011–12 Premier League season. (BBC Sport)
- Matchday 5 of the AFC Champions League group stage takes place in Asia. In Group C, Sepahan and Al-Ahli defeated their respective opponents Al-Nasr and Lekhwiya 3–0. Group D saw Al-Hilal defeat Persepolis 1–0 and Al-Gharafa beat Al-Shabab 2–1. Central Coast Mariners defeated Tianjin Teda 5–1 in Group G, while Seongnam Ilhwa Chunma and Nagoya Grampus played out a 1–1 draw in the other group game. Kashiwa Reysol won 1–0 against Buriram United and Jeonbuk Hyundai Motors defeated Guangzhou Evergrande 3–1 in Group H.
- The Copa Libertadores Round of 16 continued in South America; Cruz Azul and Libertad played out a 1–1 draw, and a goal from Iván Bella gave Vélez Sársfield a 1–0 victory at Atlético Nacional.

Snooker

- Following a 13–2 World Championship quarter-final defeat to fellow Scottish player Stephen Maguire, seven-time world champion Stephen Hendry announces his immediate retirement from the sport, aged 43. (The Daily Telegraph)

Swimming

- Men's 100m breaststroke world champion Alexander Dale Oen dies aged 26, after suffering a cardiac arrest at a training camp in Flagstaff, Arizona. (Associated Press via The Guardian)
