= Khimki Basketball Center =

Indoor sporting arena in Russia

- Basketball Center
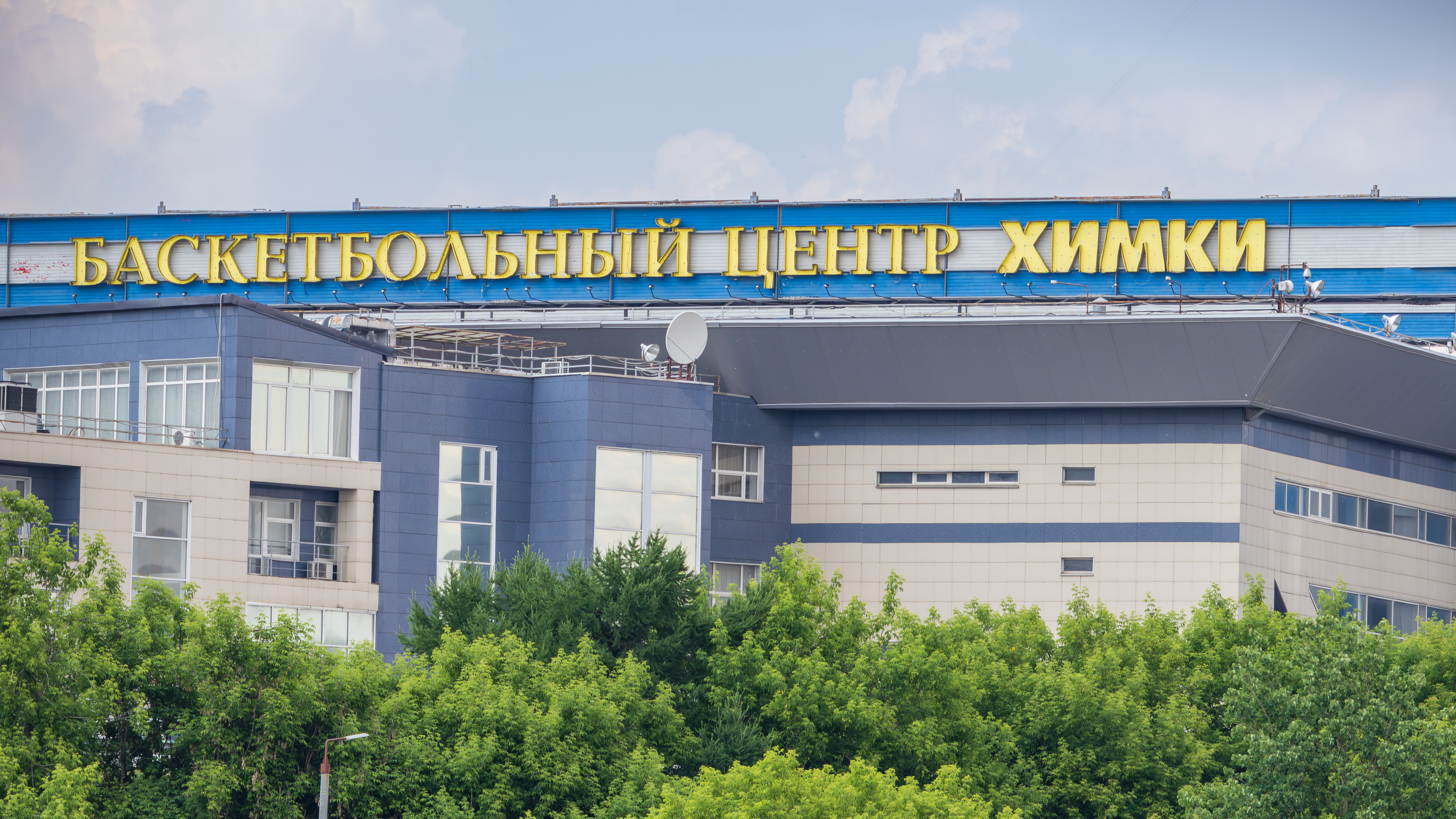
- Basketball Center in June 2026
- Interactive map of Khimki Basketball Center
- Full name: Khimki Basketball Center Of Moscow Region
- Former names: Innovator Sports Palace
- Location: Khimki, Russia (Moscow Region)
- Coordinates: 55.885945°N 37.456298°E
- Capacity: Basketball: 5,025 (total capacity with lounges); 4,000 (regular fan seats); 164 (VIP seating); 45 (media seating)
- Surface: Parquet

Construction
- Opened: 1970
- Renovated: 2005, 2009, 2010
- Expanded: 2009, 2010

Tenant
- Khimki Moscow Region

Khimki Basketball Center, or Khimki Basketball Center of Moscow Region, is an indoor sporting arena that is located in Khimki, Russia. The total seating capacity of the arena for basketball games is 5,025, which includes the arena's lounge areas. The arena's regular fan seating capacity is 4,000. It is the home arena of the VTB United League professional basketball club Khimki Moscow Region.

The main playing hall and stands contain 4,000 seats, the arena complex also includes: two training gyms, six locker rooms (two of which are of NBA level), a press seating section with 45 seats, and 4 commentator cabins, a location setup for TV cameras, a VIP-persons seating section with 164 seats, a media press room center, a post production center, and other features.

== History ==
The arena was originally opened in the year 1970. In 2005, it was reconstructed, renovated, and remodeled. After Khimki Moscow Region qualified to play in the 2009–10 EuroLeague season, the arena was again further renovated and updated, and its regular fan seating capacity was increased from 3,500 to 4,000, with the arena's overall capacity being increased to 5,025, including lounge areas. Starting with the 2016–17 EuroLeague season, the EuroLeague no longer allowed Khimki to play its home EuroLeague games at the arena, since it did not meet the EuroLeague's minimum arena seating capacity rule of at least 5,000 regular fan seats.

The arena was used to host the 2012 EuroCup Final Four.
