= 2012 Eurocup Basketball Final Four =

Finals of the European second-tier basketball league

2012 Eurocup Final Four

Tournament details
- Arena: Basketball Center; Khimki, Russia
- Dates: 14–15 April 2012

Final positions
- Champions: (Russia) Khimki; 1st title
- Runners-up: (Spain) Valencia
- Third place: (Lithuania) Lietuvos rytas
- Fourth place: (Russia) Spartak St. Petersburg

Awards and statistics
- MVP: (Croatia) Zoran Planinić

The 2012 Eurocup Final Four was the concluding stage of the 2011–12 Eurocup season, the 10th season of the second-tier basketball league in Europe.

Euroleague Basketball Company announced that the 2011-12 Eurocup season would culminate with the Eurocup Finals in Khimki, Russia, on April 14 and 15. The host Khimki won the Eurocup title, after beating Valencia in the Final. Khimki's Zoran Planinić was named the Final Four MVP.

== Bracket ==
Semifinals
14 April
(Spain) Valencia	80
(Lithuania) Lietuvos rytas	70
14 April
(Russia) Spartak St. Petersburg	73
(Russia) Khimki	77

Final
15 April
(Spain) Valencia	68
(Russia) Khimki	77
Third place game
15 April
(Lithuania) Lietuvos rytas	71
(Russia) Spartak St. Petersburg	62

== Semifinals ==
14 April 2012
13:30

Report

Valencia Basket (Spain)	80–70	(Lithuania) Lietuvos Rytas
Scoring by quarter: 29–15, 13–17, 19–16, 19–22
Pts: Newley, Caner-Medley 12; Rebs: Three players 5 Asts: Marković 4		Pts: Babrauskas 21; Rebs: Roberts 8 Asts: Rašić, Babrauskas 3

Basketball Center, Khimki
Attendance: 3,870
Referees: Guerrino Cerebuch (ITA), Matej Boltauzer (SLO), Eddie Viator (FRA)

14 April 2012
16:30

Report

Khimki (Russia)	77–73	(Russia) Spartak St. Petersburg
Scoring by quarter: 27–14, 15–24, 14–22, 21–13
Pts: Fridzon 16; Rebs: Lončar 9 Asts: Planinić 5		Pts: Halperin, Beverley 15; Rebs: Likhodey 9 Asts: Halperin 5

Basketball Center, Khimki
Attendance: 3,870
Referees: Christos Christodoulou (GRE), Milivoje Jovcic (SRB), Juan Carlos Garcia Gonzalez (ESP)

== Third place game ==
15 April 2012
13:30

Report

Lietuvos Rytas (Lithuania)	71–62	(Russia) Spartak St. Petersburg
Scoring by quarter: 24–10, 16–20, 15–14, 16–18
Pts: Seibutis 21; Rebs: Valančiūnas 12; Asts: Seibutis 4		Pts: Beverley 18; Rebs: Dragičević, Keyru 5 Asts: Three players 4

Basketball Center, Khimki
Attendance: 1,950
Referees: Juan Carlos Garcia Gonzalez (ESP), Anastasios Piloidis (GRE), Rustu Nuran (TUR)

== Final ==
15 April 2012
16:30

Report

Khimki (Russia)	77–68	(Spain) Valencia Basket
Scoring by quarter: 16–15, 21–15, 15–20, 25–18
Pts: Planinić 19; Rebs: Quinn 5 Asts: Planinić 4		Pts: Caner-Medley 23; Rebs: Caner-Medley 11; Asts: Marković 4

Basketball Center, Khimki
Attendance: 4,100
Referees: Guerrino Cerebuch (ITA), Christos Christodoulou (GRE), Eddie Viator (FRA)

Khimki	Valencia
