= Tripple X III =

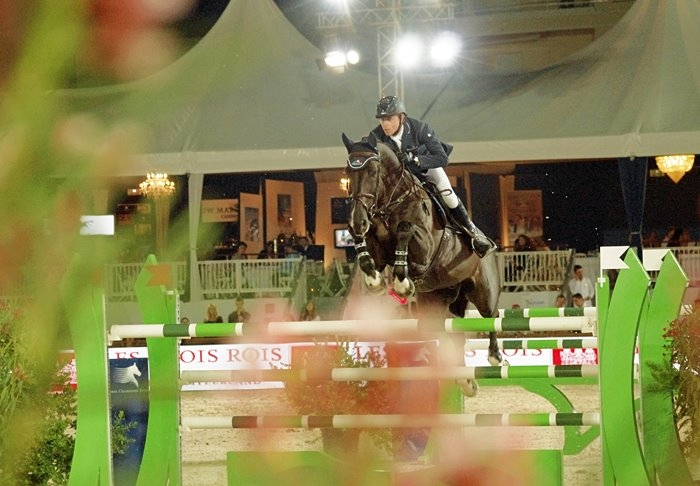
- Tripple X III competing at the Winter Equestrian Festival
- Breed: Anglo European Warmblood
- Discipline: Show Jumping
- Sire: Namelus R
- Dam: Calve B Z
- Sex: Stallion
- Foaled: June 1, 2002
- Color: Dark Bay
- Breeder: Ben Maher
- Owner: Astrisan Farms LLC
- Rider: Ben Maher Tiffany Foster

Tripple X III (Namelus R x Calve B Z) is a horse formerly ridden by Canadian Tiffany Foster and British Ben Maher. Most famously he and Maher were on the gold medal-winning team at the 2012 Olympic Games in London. Foster also rode him to the team gold at the 2015 Pan American Games in Toronto on home soil.

== Life ==
Triple X III, also called "Hugo" around the barn, was bred by Ben Maher at his farm in the United Kingdom. Although described as being "ugly" as a young horse, the feeling Hugo gave when being ridden couldn't be ignored, and Maher decided to keep the stallion. Maher rode Hugo for the formative years in his career, taking him all the way to the 5* level and competed him at the 2012 London Olympics in which the British team won the gold medal and the pair finished 9th individually, as well. Maher and Hugo also won major Grand Prixs at London Olympia, Hickstead, and LGCT of Valencia. In 2014, Maher was ready to sell Hugo, and Andy Ziegler of Artisan Farms LLC stepped up to buy the stallion.

Originally intended to only be a short-term partnership, Foster, Ziegler's rider, meshed so well with Hugo that they decided to keep the horse in her string. Jumping more than 100 international classes, Hugo and Foster had an excellent career together. In 2015, they helped the Canadian team to the gold medal at the 2015 Pan American Games and competed in the 2016 Olympic Games in Rio de Janeiro where the team was 4th overall and Hugo and Foster finished 26th individually.

In July 2019, Foster and Artisan Farms LLC announced that Hugo would be retired at the age of 17. According to Foster, Hugo was in good health despite some minor injuries, however they did not see the risk of injury being worth bringing him back to the competition ring. Hugo had a retirement ceremony at the CSIO Hickstead show, a venue where he won the Grand Prix in 2013 with Maher. Hugo is still ridden regularly and splits time between Foster's Belgian farm during the summer and Maher's farm in England during the winter while Foster competes in Florida.

Hugo was known to be easygoing and easy to work with and enjoyed paddock time. He did not like other horses coming near him. He was also especially known for his striking, light-colored eyes. He is not currently available for breeding

== Pedigree ==
Tripple X III (Anglo European Warmblood)	Namelus R (KWPN)	Concorde (KWPN)	Voltaire (Hannoverian)
Tripple X III (Anglo European Warmblood)	Namelus R (KWPN)	Concorde (KWPN)	Flyer (KWPN)
Tripple X III (Anglo European Warmblood)	Namelus R (KWPN)	Eamelusiena (KWPN)	Joost (Holsteiner)
Tripple X III (Anglo European Warmblood)	Namelus R (KWPN)	Eamelusiena (KWPN)	Amelusiena (KWPN)
Tripple X III (Anglo European Warmblood)	Calve B Z (Zangersheide)	Nissan Catango Z (Holsteiner)	Cantus (Holsteiner)
Tripple X III (Anglo European Warmblood)	Calve B Z (Zangersheide)	Nissan Catango Z (Holsteiner)	Zita (Holsteiner)
Tripple X III (Anglo European Warmblood)	Calve B Z (Zangersheide)	Kamalve (KWPN)	Ramiro Z (Holsteiner)
Tripple X III (Anglo European Warmblood)	Calve B Z (Zangersheide)	Kamalve (KWPN)	Dalve (KWPN)

== Major results ==
Tripple X III's Major Results
Year	Place	Rider	Event	Rating	Show	Location
2016	4	Tiffany Foster	Olympic Games - Team	OLY	Olympic Games	Rio de Janeiro (BRA)
2016	5	Tiffany Foster	Rolex Aachen Grand Prix	CSIO5*	CHIO Aachen	Aachen (GER)
2015	Gold	Tiffany Foster	Pan American Cames	Pan-Am	Pan American Games	Toronto (CAN)
2014	1	Tiffany Foster	Spruce Meadows Nations Cup	CSIO5*	Spruce Meadows Masters	Calgary (CAN)
2013	1	Ben Maher	London World Cup Qualifier	CSI5*-W	London Olympia	London (GRB)
2013	1	Ben Maher	Winning Round 1.50m	CSI5*-W	Stuttgart German Masters	Stuttgart (GER)
2013	1	Ben Maher	Longines King George V Gold Cup	CSIO5*	Hickstead	Hickstead (GBR)
2012	1	Ben Maher	The Christmas Masters 1.50m	CSI5*-W	London Olympia	London (GBR)
2012	Gold	Ben Maher	Olympic Games - Team	OLY	Olympic Games	London (GBR)
2012	9th	Ben Maher	Olympic Games - Individual	OLY	Olympic Games	London (GBR)
2012	1	Ben Maher	GCT Grand Prix of Oliva	CSI5*	GCT of Oliva	Oliva (SPA)
2011	1	Ben Maher	1.55m Table A	CSI5*	Longines CSI Basel	Basel (SUI)
2011	1	Ben Maher	London World Cup Qualifier	CSI5*-W	London Olympia	London (GBR)
2011	1	Ben Maher	1.55m Table A	CSI5*	Paris	Paris (FRA)
2011	1	Ben Maher	Linz-Ebelsberg Grand Prix	CSIO4*	Linz-Ebelsberg	Linz (AUT)
