= Handball at the 2012 Summer Olympics – Men's qualification =

The qualification for the 2012 Men's Olympic Handball Tournament is held from January 2011 to April 2012.

== Qualification summary ==
	Date	Venue	Vacancies	Qualified
Host nation			1	Great Britain
2011 World Championship	13–30 January 2011	Sweden	1	France
2011 Pan American Games	16–24 October 2011	Mexico	1	Argentina
2011 Asian Olympic Qualification Tournament	23 October – 2 November 2011	South Korea	1	South Korea
2012 African Championship	11–20 January 2012	Morocco	1	Tunisia
2012 European Championship	15–29 January 2012	Serbia	1	Denmark
2012 IHF Qualification Tournament #1	6–8 April 2012	Spain	2	Spain; Serbia
2012 IHF Qualification Tournament #2	6–8 April 2012	Sweden	2	Sweden; Hungary
2012 IHF Qualification Tournament #3	6–8 April 2012	Croatia	2	Croatia; Iceland
Total			12	

Legend for qualification type
Team qualified to the 2012 Olympic Tournament
Team qualified from the World Championship to the Olympic Qualification Tournament
Team qualified from Continental Events to the Olympic Qualification Tournament

== World Championship ==
Rank	Team
1st place, gold medalist(s)	France
2nd place, silver medalist(s)	Denmark
3rd place, bronze medalist(s)	Spain
4	Sweden
5	Croatia
6	Iceland
7	Hungary
8	Poland
9	Norway
10	Serbia
11	Germany
12	Argentina
13	South Korea
14	Egypt
15	Algeria
16	Japan
17	Slovakia
18	Austria
19	Romania
20	Tunisia
21	Brazil
22	Chile
23	Bahrain
24	Australia

== Continental qualification ==
=== Europe (1st ranking continent) ===
Rank	Team
1st place, gold medalist(s)	Denmark
2nd place, silver medalist(s)	Serbia
3rd place, bronze medalist(s)	Croatia
4	Spain
5	North Macedonia
6	Slovenia
7	Germany
8	Hungary
9	Poland
10	Iceland
11	France
12	Sweden
13	Norway
14	Czech Republic
15	Russia
16	Slovakia

=== America (2nd ranking continent) ===
Rank	Team
1st place, gold medalist(s)	Argentina
2nd place, silver medalist(s)	Brazil
3rd place, bronze medalist(s)	Chile
4	Dominican Republic
5	Canada
6	Mexico
7	United States
8	Venezuela

=== Asia (3rd ranking continent) ===
==== Preliminary round ====
http://todor66.com/handball/Asia/Men_OQ_2011.html

===== Group A =====
Team	Pld	W	D	L	GF	GA	GD	Pts
Saudi Arabia	4	3	0	1	120	96	+24	6
Iran	4	3	0	1	128	99	+29	6
Qatar	4	2	1	1	129	125	+4	5
Kuwait	4	1	1	2	119	114	+5	3
Uzbekistan	4	0	0	4	106	168	−62	0
Australia	0	0	0	0	0	0	0	0

23.10 16:20 Saudi Arabia 41-26 Uzbekistan 17-13

23.10 20:20 Iran 27-23 Kuwait 11-9

24.10 13:00 Saudi Arabia 22-21 Iran 11-8

24.10 17:00 Qatar 38-32 Uzbekistan 20-15

25.10 15:00 Qatar 31-31 Kuwait 16-15

27.10 13:00 Iran 45-22 Uzbekistan 22-8

27.10 17:00 Saudi Arabia 30-21 Kuwait 16-10

28.10 15:00 Iran 35-32 Qatar 14-15

29.10 13:00 Kuwait 44-26 Uzbekistan 18-12

29.10 17:00 Qatar 28-27 Saudi Arabia 14-11

===== Group B =====
Team	Pld	W	D	L	GF	GA	GD	Pts
South Korea	4	4	0	0	134	82	+52	8
Japan	4	3	0	1	124	99	+25	6
China	4	2	0	2	111	96	+15	4
Oman	4	1	0	3	117	116	+1	2
Kazakhstan	4	0	0	4	73	166	−93	0
New Zealand	0	0	0	0	0	0	0	0

23.10 14:20 South Korea 31-18 Japan 14-6

23.10 18:20 Oman 41-27 Kazakhstan 21-15

24.10 15:00 Japan 26-24 China 12-10

24.10 19:00 South Korea 41-15 Kazakhstan 24-5

25.10 17:00 South Korea 31-24 Oman 13-14

27.10 15:00 Japan 34-29 Oman 20-8

27.10 19:00 China 38-16 Kazakhstan 19-8

28.10 17:00 South Korea 31-25 China 13-10

29.10 15:00 Japan 46-15 Kazakhstan 22-5

29.10 19:00 China 24-23 Oman 12-13

==== Knockout round ====
Semifinal
October 31
Saudi Arabia	21
Japan	22
October 31
South Korea	33
Iran	25

Final
November 2
Japan	21
South Korea	26
3rd place match
November 2
Saudi Arabia	20
Iran	21

==== Final standing ====
Rank	Team
1st place, gold medalist(s)	South Korea
2nd place, silver medalist(s)	Japan
3rd place, bronze medalist(s)	Iran
4	Saudi Arabia
5	Qatar
6	China
7	Kuwait
8	Oman
9	Uzbekistan
10	Kazakhstan
11	Australia

=== Africa (4th ranking continent) ===
Rank	Team
1st place, gold medalist(s)	Tunisia
2nd place, silver medalist(s)	Algeria
3rd place, bronze medalist(s)	Egypt
4	Morocco
5	Senegal
6	Angola
7	Cameroon
8	DR Congo
9	Congo
10	Ivory Coast
11	Gabon
12	Burkina Faso

== 2012 IHF Qualification Tournaments ==
The teams eligible to participate in these three IHF Qualification Tournaments are seeded as follows :

2012 IHF Qualification Tournament #1	2012 IHF Qualification Tournament #2	2012 IHF Qualification Tournament #3
2nd from World (3rd place World 2011): Spain; 7th from World (8th place World 2011): Poland; 2nd from Continent 1 (2nd place Europe 2012): Serbia; 2nd from Continent 4 (2nd place Africa 2012): Algeria	3rd from World (4th place World 2011): Sweden; 6th from World (7th place World 2011): Hungary; 2nd from Continent 2 (2nd place Americas 2011): Brazil; 3rd from Continent 1 (5th place Europe 2012): Macedonia	4th from World (5th place World 2011): Croatia; 5th from World (6th place World 2011): Iceland; 2nd from Continent 3 (2nd place Asia 2011): Japan; 3rd from Continent 2 (3rd place Americas 2011): Chile

Notes:

- Continents are ranked based on the 2011 World Championship results.
- If the Oceania representative at the 2011 World Championship had placed from 8th to 12th, Oceania would have earned a spot for IHF Qualification Tournament #3. Oceania's representative (Australia) placed 24th.

=== 2012 IHF Qualification Tournament #1 ===
Team	Pld	W	D	L	GF	GA	GD	Pts
Spain	3	3	0	0	91	69	+22	6
Serbia	3	1	1	1	78	73	+5	3
Poland	3	1	1	1	75	85	−10	3
Algeria	3	0	0	3	65	82	−17	0

6 April 2012; 17:30	Poland	28 − 27	Algeria	Centro de Tecnificación, Alicante; Attendance: 2,000; Referees: Gjedin, Hansen (DEN)
6 April 2012; 17:30	B. Jurecki, M. Jurecki 6	(11–13)	Berkous 8	Centro de Tecnificación, Alicante; Attendance: 2,000; Referees: Gjedin, Hansen (DEN)
6 April 2012; 17:30	2× (yellow card) 5× (suspension)	Report	3× (yellow card) 8× (suspension)	Centro de Tecnificación, Alicante; Attendance: 2,000; Referees: Gjedin, Hansen (DEN)

6 April 2012; 20:15	Spain	30 – 27	Serbia	Centro de Tecnificación, Alicante; Attendance: 2,500; Referees: Horáček, Novotný (CZE)
6 April 2012; 20:15	Tomás 5	(11–10)	Ilić 9	Centro de Tecnificación, Alicante; Attendance: 2,500; Referees: Horáček, Novotný (CZE)
6 April 2012; 20:15	3× (yellow card) 2× (suspension)	Report	3× (yellow card) 6× (suspension)	Centro de Tecnificación, Alicante; Attendance: 2,500; Referees: Horáček, Novotný (CZE)

7 April 2012; 17:30	Serbia	25 – 25	Poland	Centro de Tecnificación, Alicante; Attendance: 1,000; Referees: Gjeding, Hansen (DEN)
7 April 2012; 17:30	Nikčević 6	(14–15)	three players 4	Centro de Tecnificación, Alicante; Attendance: 1,000; Referees: Gjeding, Hansen (DEN)
7 April 2012; 17:30	2× (yellow card) 6× (suspension) 1× (red card)	Report	3× (yellow card) 5× (suspension) 1× (red card)	Centro de Tecnificación, Alicante; Attendance: 1,000; Referees: Gjeding, Hansen (DEN)

7 April 2012; 20:15	Algeria	20 – 28	Spain	Centro de Tecnificación, Alicante; Attendance: 1,750; Referees: Abrahamsen, Kristiansen (NOR)
7 April 2012; 20:15	Mokrani 8	(9–14)	Cañellas 6	Centro de Tecnificación, Alicante; Attendance: 1,750; Referees: Abrahamsen, Kristiansen (NOR)
7 April 2012; 20:15	3× (yellow card) 6× (suspension) 1× (red card)	Report	3× (yellow card) 4× (suspension)	Centro de Tecnificación, Alicante; Attendance: 1,750; Referees: Abrahamsen, Kristiansen (NOR)

8 April 2012; 17:30	Serbia	26 – 18	Algeria	Centro de Tecnificación, Alicante; Attendance: 1,000; Referees: Horáček, Novotný (CZE)
8 April 2012; 17:30	Vujin 6	(15–10)	Benali 5	Centro de Tecnificación, Alicante; Attendance: 1,000; Referees: Horáček, Novotný (CZE)
8 April 2012; 17:30	3× (yellow card) 5× (suspension)	Report	3× (yellow card) 3× (suspension)	Centro de Tecnificación, Alicante; Attendance: 1,000; Referees: Horáček, Novotný (CZE)

8 April 2012; 20:15	Spain	33 – 22	Poland	Centro de Tecnificación, Alicante; Attendance: 1,500; Referees: Abrahamsen, Kristiansen (NOR)
8 April 2012; 20:15	Entrerríos 6	(18–9)	three players 4	Centro de Tecnificación, Alicante; Attendance: 1,500; Referees: Abrahamsen, Kristiansen (NOR)
8 April 2012; 20:15	2× (yellow card) 2× (suspension)	Report	2× (yellow card) 3× (suspension)	Centro de Tecnificación, Alicante; Attendance: 1,500; Referees: Abrahamsen, Kristiansen (NOR)

=== 2012 IHF Qualification Tournament #2 ===
Team	Pld	W	D	L	GF	GA	GD	Pts
Sweden	3	3	0	0	78	67	+11	6
Hungary	3	2	0	1	81	79	+2	4
Brazil	3	1	0	2	75	81	−6	2
Macedonia	3	0	0	3	76	83	−7	0

6 April 2012; 14:45	Hungary	28 − 26	Macedonia	Scandinavium, Gothenburg; Attendance: 5,004; Referees: Raluy, Sabroso (ESP)
6 April 2012; 14:45	Pérez, Császár 6	(15–13)	Lazarov 7	Scandinavium, Gothenburg; Attendance: 5,004; Referees: Raluy, Sabroso (ESP)
6 April 2012; 14:45	3× (yellow card) 8× (suspension)	Report	3× (yellow card) 4× (suspension)	Scandinavium, Gothenburg; Attendance: 5,004; Referees: Raluy, Sabroso (ESP)

6 April 2012; 17:05	Sweden	25 − 20	Brazil	Scandinavium, Gothenburg; Attendance: 7,124; Referees: Krstic, Ljubic (SLO)
6 April 2012; 17:05	Larholm 5	(12–10)	Ribeiro 5	Scandinavium, Gothenburg; Attendance: 7,124; Referees: Krstic, Ljubic (SLO)
6 April 2012; 17:05	3× (yellow card) 4× (suspension)	Report	3× (yellow card) 5× (suspension)	Scandinavium, Gothenburg; Attendance: 7,124; Referees: Krstic, Ljubic (SLO)

7 April 2012; 13:45	Brazil	27 − 29	Hungary	Scandinavium, Gothenburg; Attendance: 3,976; Referees: Raluy, Sabroso (ESP)
7 April 2012; 13:45	Pacheco 7	(15–16)	Császár, Iváncsik 6	Scandinavium, Gothenburg; Attendance: 3,976; Referees: Raluy, Sabroso (ESP)
7 April 2012; 13:45	3× (yellow card) 4× (suspension)	Report	3× (yellow card) 3× (suspension)	Scandinavium, Gothenburg; Attendance: 3,976; Referees: Raluy, Sabroso (ESP)

7 April 2012; 16:05	Macedonia	23 – 27	Sweden	Scandinavium, Gothenburg; Attendance: 8,333; Referees: Lazaar, Reveret (FRA)
7 April 2012; 16:05	Lazarov, Mirkulovski 5	(12–14)	Andersson 8	Scandinavium, Gothenburg; Attendance: 8,333; Referees: Lazaar, Reveret (FRA)
7 April 2012; 16:05	3× (yellow card) 2× (suspension)	Report	3× (yellow card) 5× (suspension)	Scandinavium, Gothenburg; Attendance: 8,333; Referees: Lazaar, Reveret (FRA)

8 April 2012; 14:45	Brazil	28 – 27	Macedonia	Scandinavium, Gothenburg; Attendance: 4,235; Referees: Krstic, Ljubic (SLO)
8 April 2012; 14:45	Pires 7	(15–13)	Lazarov 6	Scandinavium, Gothenburg; Attendance: 4,235; Referees: Krstic, Ljubic (SLO)
8 April 2012; 14:45	3× (yellow card) 1× (suspension)	Report	3× (yellow card) 2× (suspension)	Scandinavium, Gothenburg; Attendance: 4,235; Referees: Krstic, Ljubic (SLO)

8 April 2012; 17:05	Sweden	26 – 23	Hungary	Scandinavium, Gothenburg; Attendance: 7,289; Referees: Lazaar, Reveret (FRA)
8 April 2012; 17:05	Petersen 6	(11–12)	Harsányi 8	Scandinavium, Gothenburg; Attendance: 7,289; Referees: Lazaar, Reveret (FRA)
8 April 2012; 17:05	3× (yellow card) 4× (suspension)	Report	3× (yellow card) 4× (suspension)	Scandinavium, Gothenburg; Attendance: 7,289; Referees: Lazaar, Reveret (FRA)

=== 2012 IHF Qualification Tournament #3 ===
Team	Pld	W	D	L	GF	GA	GD	Pts
Croatia	3	3	0	0	102	65	+37	6
Iceland	3	2	0	1	94	78	+16	4
Japan	3	1	0	2	85	103	−18	2
Chile	3	0	0	3	58	93	−35	0

6 April 2012; 18:00	Croatia	36 − 22	Japan	Varaždin Arena, Varaždin; Attendance: 2,500; Referees: Badura, Ondogrecula (SVK)
6 April 2012; 18:00	Čupić 7	(16–14)	Miyazaki 4	Varaždin Arena, Varaždin; Attendance: 2,500; Referees: Badura, Ondogrecula (SVK)
6 April 2012; 18:00	3× (yellow card) 2× (suspension)	Report	3× (yellow card) 2× (suspension)	Varaždin Arena, Varaždin; Attendance: 2,500; Referees: Badura, Ondogrecula (SVK)

6 April 2012; 20:15	Iceland	25 − 17	Chile	Varaždin Arena, Varaždin; Attendance: 750; Referees: Stark, Stefan (ROU)
6 April 2012; 20:15	Sigurdsson 10	(12–7)	seven players 2	Varaždin Arena, Varaždin; Attendance: 750; Referees: Stark, Stefan (ROU)
6 April 2012; 20:15	1× (yellow card) 7× (suspension)	Report	2× (yellow card) 2× (suspension)	Varaždin Arena, Varaždin; Attendance: 750; Referees: Stark, Stefan (ROU)

7 April 2012; 16:00	Chile	15 – 35	Croatia	Varaždin Arena, Varaždin; Attendance: 2,300; Referees: Badura, Ondogrecula (SVK)
7 April 2012; 16:00	four players 2	(9–17)	Horvat, Batinović 6	Varaždin Arena, Varaždin; Attendance: 2,300; Referees: Badura, Ondogrecula (SVK)
7 April 2012; 16:00	3× (yellow card) 5× (suspension)	Report	2× (yellow card) 4× (suspension)	Varaždin Arena, Varaždin; Attendance: 2,300; Referees: Badura, Ondogrecula (SVK)

7 April 2012; 20:15	Japan	30 – 41	Iceland	Varaždin Arena, Varaždin; Attendance: 700; Referees: Geipel, Helbig (GER)
7 April 2012; 20:15	Kochi, Miyazaki 6	(11–20)	Gunnarsson 9	Varaždin Arena, Varaždin; Attendance: 700; Referees: Geipel, Helbig (GER)
7 April 2012; 20:15	3× (yellow card)	Report	3× (yellow card) 2× (suspension)	Varaždin Arena, Varaždin; Attendance: 700; Referees: Geipel, Helbig (GER)

8 April 2012; 15:30	Japan	33 – 26	Chile	Varaždin Arena, Varaždin; Attendance: 500; Referees: Stark, Stefan (ROU)
8 April 2012; 15:30	Suematsu, Miyazaki 5	(14–9)	Feuchtmann Perez 9	Varaždin Arena, Varaždin; Attendance: 500; Referees: Stark, Stefan (ROU)
8 April 2012; 15:30	3× (yellow card) 3× (suspension)	Report	2× (yellow card) 3× (suspension)	Varaždin Arena, Varaždin; Attendance: 500; Referees: Stark, Stefan (ROU)

8 April 2012; 18:00	Croatia	31 – 28	Iceland	Varaždin Arena, Varaždin; Attendance: 4,500; Referees: Geipel, Helbig (GER)
8 April 2012; 18:00	Čupić 9	(18–15)	Sigurdsson 8	Varaždin Arena, Varaždin; Attendance: 4,500; Referees: Geipel, Helbig (GER)
8 April 2012; 18:00	2× (yellow card) 2× (suspension) 1× (red card)	Report	1× (yellow card) 5× (suspension)	Varaždin Arena, Varaždin; Attendance: 4,500; Referees: Geipel, Helbig (GER)
