= Water polo at the 2012 Summer Olympics – Women's qualification =

The 2012 Women's Water Polo Olympic Qualification Tournament was held at the Polo Natatorio Bruno Bianchi in Trieste, Italy, from 15 to 22 April 2012.

== Participants ==
There were 12 places originally allocated to continental associations in the tournament not already directly qualified to the Olympics – 5 from Europe, 3 from the Americas, 2 from Asia, 1 from Africa, and 1 from Oceania.

Italy qualified from Europe as host country. Greece, Hungary, Russia and Spain qualified from the 2012 European Water Polo Championships and confirmed their attendance at the tournament. Canada, Brazil and Cuba qualified from the 2011 Pan American Games, Canada and Brazil confirmed their attendance, but Cuba declined to participate and no other teams from the 2011 Pan American Games volunteered to take their place. Kazakhstan and Japan qualified from the 2012 Asian Water Polo Championship, Kazakhstan confirmed their attendance, but Japan declined to participate and there were no other nations entered in the 2012 Asian Water Polo Championship to take their place. There was an article written by a FINA press correspondent in Japan showing confusion around the qualification procedure from the Asian Championship, as the article states that the winners of the Asian Championship had advanced to this qualification tournament (in fact, they qualified directly for the Olympics) and that Japan could no longer get to the Olympics (in fact, according to FINA By-Laws, they were eligible for this tournament, and they did not apply).

No teams from Africa or Oceania applied to participate in the qualification tournament. The next highest placed teams from the other continents were invited to take the four available places (one each from the Americas, Asia, Africa and Oceania), in the following rotation:

- Host continent (Europe)
- Americas
- Asia
- Europe
- Oceania
- Africa

As there were no remaining American, Asian, Oceanic, nor African teams making themselves available for selection, the available places were offered to the teams in the 2012 European Water Polo Championships that were not already either qualified for the Olympics or already in this tournament. Only the Netherlands accepted. The qualification tournament, designed as a 12-team tournament, therefore had only 9 entries.

Europe	How qualified
Italy	Host country (1st, 2012 European Water Polo Championships)
Greece	2nd, 2012 European Water Polo Championships
Hungary	3rd, 2012 European Water Polo Championships
Russia	4th, 2012 European Water Polo Championships
Spain	5th, 2012 European Water Polo Championships
Netherlands	6th, 2012 European Water Polo Championships
Americas	
Canada	2nd, 2011 Pan American Games
Brazil	3rd, 2011 Pan American Games
Asia	
Kazakhstan	2nd, 2012 Asian Water Polo Championship
Africa	
	No entries
Oceania	
	No entries

== Draw ==
The draw took place on 19 February 2012 at 12:00 at the Crowne Plaza, London Docklands. There were originally to be six teams in each preliminary round group. However, with the low number of entries for this tournament, there was one group of four teams and one group of five teams. Each team was taken from a draw line of two teams based on their results, first in the last World Championships, then by their last continental championships.

Draw line	Country	Status	Drawn into group	Country	Status	Drawn into group
Line 1	Greece	1st, 2011 World Championships	B	Russia	3rd, 2011 World Championships	A
Line 2	Italy	4th, 2011 World Championships	A	Netherlands	7th, 2011 World Championships	B
Line 3	Canada	8th, 2011 World Championships	B	Hungary	9th, 2011 World Championships	A
Line 4	Spain	11th, 2011 World Championships	A	Kazakhstan	13th, 2011 World Championships	B
Line 5	Brazil	14th, 2011 World Championships	B			

After being drawn into Group A and B, the teams drew numbers from 1 to 5 to determine the order of matches.

	Group A		Group B
1	Italy	1	Greece
2	Russia	2	Brazil
3	Hungary	3	Canada
4	Spain	4	Kazakhstan
		5	Netherlands

== Preliminary round ==
All times are local (UTC+2)

=== Group A ===
	Team	G	W	D	L	GF	GA	Diff	Points
1.	Hungary	3	2	0	1	32	32	0	4
2.	Russia	3	2	0	1	39	37	+2	4
3.	Spain	3	1	0	2	30	31	-1	2
4.	Italy	3	1	0	2	33	34	-1	2

17 April 2012; 18:40	Report	Russia	12–13	Hungary	Polo Natatorio Bruno Bianchi, Trieste; Referees: Littlejohn (GBR), Stavridis (GRE)
17 April 2012; 18:40	Report	Score by quarters: 2-3, 3-3, 4-4, 3-3			Polo Natatorio Bruno Bianchi, Trieste; Referees: Littlejohn (GBR), Stavridis (GRE)

17 April 2012; 20:00	Report	Italy	9–10	Spain	Polo Natatorio Bruno Bianchi, Trieste; Referees: Matache (ROU), Williams (NZL)
17 April 2012; 20:00	Report	Score by quarters: 4-2, 2-2, 0-1, 3-5			Polo Natatorio Bruno Bianchi, Trieste; Referees: Matache (ROU), Williams (NZL)

18 April 2012; 18:40	Report	Russia	12–11	Spain	Polo Natatorio Bruno Bianchi, Trieste; Referees: Klopper (NED), Deslieres (CAN)
18 April 2012; 18:40	Report	Score by quarters: 3-2, 3-3, 3-4, 3-2			Polo Natatorio Bruno Bianchi, Trieste; Referees: Klopper (NED), Deslieres (CAN)

18 April 2012; 20:00	Report	Italy	11–9	Hungary	Polo Natatorio Bruno Bianchi, Trieste; Referees: Stavridis (GRE), Carvalho (BRA)
18 April 2012; 20:00	Report	Score by quarters: 1-3, 4-2, 4-4, 2-0			Polo Natatorio Bruno Bianchi, Trieste; Referees: Stavridis (GRE), Carvalho (BRA)

19 April 2012; 18:40	Report	Hungary	10–9	Spain	Polo Natatorio Bruno Bianchi, Trieste; Referees: Williams (NZL), Deslieres (CAN)
19 April 2012; 18:40	Report	Score by quarters: 2-0, 3-2, 2-5, 3-2			Polo Natatorio Bruno Bianchi, Trieste; Referees: Williams (NZL), Deslieres (CAN)

19 April 2012; 20:00	Report	Russia	15–13	Italy	Polo Natatorio Bruno Bianchi, Trieste; Referees: Matache (ROU), Carvalho (BRA)
19 April 2012; 20:00	Report	Score by quarters: 3-4, 6-3, 4-4, 2-2			Polo Natatorio Bruno Bianchi, Trieste; Referees: Matache (ROU), Carvalho (BRA)

=== Group B ===
	Team	G	W	D	L	GF	GA	Diff	Points
1.	Netherlands	4	3	1	0	62	28	+34	7
2.	Greece	4	3	0	1	55	27	+28	6
3.	Canada	4	2	1	1	39	29	+10	5
4.	Kazakhstan	4	0	1	3	26	53	-27	1
5.	Brazil	4	0	1	3	19	64	-45	1

15 April 2012; 18:00	Report	Canada	15–4	Kazakhstan	Polo Natatorio Bruno Bianchi, Trieste; Referees: Littlejohn (GBR), Teixido (ESP)
15 April 2012; 18:00	Report	Score by quarters: 3-2, 3-2, 5-0, 4-0			Polo Natatorio Bruno Bianchi, Trieste; Referees: Littlejohn (GBR), Teixido (ESP)

15 April 2012; 19:20	Report	Brazil	4–23	Netherlands	Polo Natatorio Bruno Bianchi, Trieste; Referees: Williams (NZL), Cao (CHN)
15 April 2012; 19:20	Report	Score by quarters: 1-6, 1-6, 1-4, 1-7			Polo Natatorio Bruno Bianchi, Trieste; Referees: Williams (NZL), Cao (CHN)

16 April 2012; 17:30	Report	Netherlands	11–11	Canada	Polo Natatorio Bruno Bianchi, Trieste; Referees: Bianchi (ITA), Matache (ROU)
16 April 2012; 17:30	Report	Score by quarters: 2-3, 2-3, 3-1, 4-4			Polo Natatorio Bruno Bianchi, Trieste; Referees: Bianchi (ITA), Matache (ROU)

16 April 2012; 18:50	Report	Greece	23–4	Brazil	Polo Natatorio Bruno Bianchi, Trieste; Referees: Vogel (HUN), Krapivin (RUS)
16 April 2012; 18:50	Report	Score by quarters: 7-1, 5-1, 6-1, 5-1			Polo Natatorio Bruno Bianchi, Trieste; Referees: Vogel (HUN), Krapivin (RUS)

17 April 2012; 16:00	Report	Kazakhstan	7–15	Netherlands	Polo Natatorio Bruno Bianchi, Trieste; Referees: Cao (CHN), Vogel (HUN)
17 April 2012; 16:00	Report	Score by quarters: 1-4, 3-6, 2-3, 1-2			Polo Natatorio Bruno Bianchi, Trieste; Referees: Cao (CHN), Vogel (HUN)

17 April 2012; 17:20	Report	Canada	2–10	Greece	Polo Natatorio Bruno Bianchi, Trieste; Referees: Teixido (ESP), Bianchi (ITA)
17 April 2012; 17:20	Report	Score by quarters: 0-2, 0-1, 1-2, 1-5			Polo Natatorio Bruno Bianchi, Trieste; Referees: Teixido (ESP), Bianchi (ITA)

18 April 2012; 16:00	Report	Greece	16–8	Kazakhstan	Polo Natatorio Bruno Bianchi, Trieste; Referees: Cao (CHN), Krapivin (RUS)
18 April 2012; 16:00	Report	Score by quarters: 4-3, 6-1, 5-2, 1-2			Polo Natatorio Bruno Bianchi, Trieste; Referees: Cao (CHN), Krapivin (RUS)

18 April 2012; 17:20	Report	Brazil	4–11	Canada	Polo Natatorio Bruno Bianchi, Trieste; Referees: Matache (ROU), Littlejohn (GBR)
18 April 2012; 17:20	Report	Score by quarters: 1-2, 2-4, 0-3, 1-2			Polo Natatorio Bruno Bianchi, Trieste; Referees: Matache (ROU), Littlejohn (GBR)

19 April 2012; 16:00	Report	Kazakhstan	7–7	Brazil	Polo Natatorio Bruno Bianchi, Trieste; Referees: Littlejohn (GBR), Vogel (HUN)
19 April 2012; 16:00	Report	Score by quarters: 3-1, 1-2, 2-3, 1-1			Polo Natatorio Bruno Bianchi, Trieste; Referees: Littlejohn (GBR), Vogel (HUN)

19 April 2012; 17:20	Report	Greece	6–13	Netherlands	Polo Natatorio Bruno Bianchi, Trieste; Referees: Teixido (ESP), Bianchi (ITA)
19 April 2012; 17:20	Report	Score by quarters: 2-3, 1-3, 1-4, 2-3			Polo Natatorio Bruno Bianchi, Trieste; Referees: Teixido (ESP), Bianchi (ITA)

== Final phase ==
All times are local (UTC+2)

Bracket

Quarterfinals
A1	Hungary	18
B4	Kazakhstan	5
A3	Spain	9
B2	Greece	7
A2	Russia	7
B3	Canada	6
A4	Italy	7
B1	Netherlands	6

1st-4th semifinals
A1	Hungary	8
A3	Spain	10
A2	Russia	13
A4	Italy	14

Gold medal game
A3	Spain	9
A4	Italy	5
Bronze medal game
A1	Hungary	13
A2	Russia	18

5th-8th place bracket

5th-8th semifinals
B4	Kazakhstan	9
B2	Greece	21
B3	Canada	13
B1	Netherlands	16

5th place
B2	Greece	10
B1	Netherlands	11
7th place
B4	Kazakhstan	2
B3	Canada	17

== Quarterfinal round ==
The winners in the quarterfinal round qualify for the 2012 Olympic Games water polo tournament.

20 April 2012; 15:30	Report	Hungary	18–5	Kazakhstan	Polo Natatorio Bruno Bianchi, Trieste; Referees: Williams (NZL), Klopper (NED)
20 April 2012; 15:30	Report	Score by quarters: 6-1, 3-1, 4-1, 5-2			Polo Natatorio Bruno Bianchi, Trieste; Referees: Williams (NZL), Klopper (NED)

20 April 2012; 17:00	Report	Russia	7–6	Canada	Polo Natatorio Bruno Bianchi, Trieste; Referees: Matache (ROU), Carvalho (BRA)
20 April 2012; 17:00	Report	Score by quarters: 4-1, 1-1, 1-1, 1-3			Polo Natatorio Bruno Bianchi, Trieste; Referees: Matache (ROU), Carvalho (BRA)

20 April 2012; 18:30	Report	Spain	9–7	Greece	Polo Natatorio Bruno Bianchi, Trieste; Referees: Krapivin (RUS), Vogel (HUN)
20 April 2012; 18:30	Report	Score by quarters: 1-0, 5-6, 2-1, 1-0			Polo Natatorio Bruno Bianchi, Trieste; Referees: Krapivin (RUS), Vogel (HUN)

20 April 2012; 20:00	Report	Italy	7–6	Netherlands	Polo Natatorio Bruno Bianchi, Trieste; Referees: Stavridis (GRE), Teixido (ESP)
20 April 2012; 20:00	Report	Score by quarters: 2-2, 3-3, 0-1, 2-0			Polo Natatorio Bruno Bianchi, Trieste; Referees: Stavridis (GRE), Teixido (ESP)

== Semifinal round ==
=== 5th-8th classification semifinals ===
21 April 2012; 16:00	Report	Kazakhstan	9–21	Greece	Polo Natatorio Bruno Bianchi, Trieste; Referees: Vogel (HUN), Deslieres (CAN)
21 April 2012; 16:00	Report	Score by quarters: 1-7, 4-4, 2-6, 2-4			Polo Natatorio Bruno Bianchi, Trieste; Referees: Vogel (HUN), Deslieres (CAN)

21 April 2012; 17:30	Report	Canada	13–16	Netherlands	Polo Natatorio Bruno Bianchi, Trieste; Referees: Williams (NZL), Aimbetov (KAZ)
21 April 2012; 17:30	Report	Score by quarters: 3-6, 3-4, 5-3, 2-3			Polo Natatorio Bruno Bianchi, Trieste; Referees: Williams (NZL), Aimbetov (KAZ)

=== 1st-4th classification semifinals ===
21 April 2012; 19:00	Report	Hungary	8–10	Spain	Polo Natatorio Bruno Bianchi, Trieste; Referees: Bianchi (ITA), Cao (CHN)
21 April 2012; 19:00	Report	Score by quarters: 0-2, 4-3, 2-3, 2-2			Polo Natatorio Bruno Bianchi, Trieste; Referees: Bianchi (ITA), Cao (CHN)

21 April 2012; 20:30	Report	Russia	13–14	Italy	Polo Natatorio Bruno Bianchi, Trieste; Referees: Littlejohn (GBR), Matache (ROU)
21 April 2012; 20:30	Report	Score by quarters: 5-5, 2-3, 4-3, 2-3			Polo Natatorio Bruno Bianchi, Trieste; Referees: Littlejohn (GBR), Matache (ROU)

== Final round ==
=== 7th-8th place ===
22 April 2012; 08:30	Report	Kazakhstan	2–17	Canada	Polo Natatorio Bruno Bianchi, Trieste; Referees: Cao (CHN), Klopper (NED)
22 April 2012; 08:30	Report	Score by quarters: 0-5, 0-5, 1-2, 1-5			Polo Natatorio Bruno Bianchi, Trieste; Referees: Cao (CHN), Klopper (NED)

=== 5th-6th place ===
22 April 2012; 10:00	Report	Greece	10–11 (OT)	Netherlands	Polo Natatorio Bruno Bianchi, Trieste; Referees: Deslieres (CAN), Aimbetov (KAZ)
22 April 2012; 10:00	Report	Score by quarters: 1-2, 2-4, 5-2, 1-1 OT: 1-2			Polo Natatorio Bruno Bianchi, Trieste; Referees: Deslieres (CAN), Aimbetov (KAZ)

=== Bronze medal game ===
22 April 2012; 11:30	Report	Hungary	13–18	Russia	Polo Natatorio Bruno Bianchi, Trieste; Referees: Bianchi (ITA), Teixido (ESP)
22 April 2012; 11:30	Report	Score by quarters: 4-5, 4-5, 3-5, 2-3			Polo Natatorio Bruno Bianchi, Trieste; Referees: Bianchi (ITA), Teixido (ESP)

=== Gold medal game ===
22 April 2012; 13:00	Report	Spain	9–5	Italy	Polo Natatorio Bruno Bianchi, Trieste; Referees: Carvalho (BRA), Williams (NZL)
22 April 2012; 13:00	Report	Score by quarters: 2-1, 4-1, 1-3, 2-0			Polo Natatorio Bruno Bianchi, Trieste; Referees: Carvalho (BRA), Williams (NZL)

== Final ranking ==
RANK	TEAM
1.	Spain
2.	Italy
3.	Russia
4.	Hungary
5.	Netherlands
6.	Greece
7.	Canada
8.	Kazakhstan
9.	Brazil

== See also ==
2012 Men's Water Polo Olympic Games Qualification Tournament
